= Zonal auxiliary language =

Language made to bridge a language group

Zonal auxiliary languages, or zonal constructed languages, are constructed languages made to facilitate communication between speakers of a certain group of closely related languages. They form a subgroup of the international auxiliary languages but are intended to serve a limited linguistic or geographic area, rather than the whole world like Esperanto and Volapük. Although most zonal auxiliary languages are based on European language families, they should not be confused with "Euroclones", a pejorative term for languages intended for global use but based primarily on European material. Since universal acceptance is not the goal for zonal auxiliary languages, the traditional claims of neutrality and universalism, typical for IALs, do not apply. Although they may share the same internationalist commitments of the latter, zonal auxiliary languages have also been proposed as a defense against the effects of the growing hegemony of English on other cultures or as a means to promote a sense of ethnicity or community in a manner similar to revitalized languages, such as Modern Hebrew and Cornish. Related concepts are koiné language, a dialect that naturally emerges as a means of communication among speakers of divergent dialects of a language, and Dachsprache, a dialect that serves as a standard language for other, sometimes mutually unintelligible, dialects. The difference is that a zonal language is typically a mixture of several natural languages and is aimed to serve as an auxiliary for the speakers of different but related languages of the same family.

Most zonal constructed languages were developed during the period of romantic nationalism at the end of the 19th century, but some were created later. Most older zonal constructed languages are now known only to specialists. A modern example is Interslavic, which has become the most successful example of all zonal constructed languages.

== Pan-Slavic languages ==
Most numerous among the zonal auxiliary languages are, by far, Pan-Slavic languages. The oldest known example is Ruski jezik (1665) by the Croatian priest Juraj Križanić, who is often regarded as the first recorded Pan-Slavist. Other notable examples of early Pan-Slavic language projects are Universalis Lingua Slavica by Ján Herkeľ (1826), Uzajemni Pravopis Slavjanski by the Slovene Matija Majar (1865), Neuslawisch by the Czech Ignac Hošek (1907) and Slavina by the Czech Josef Konečný (1912). Until the beginning of the 20th century, all projects were characterized by a heavily naturalistic grammar, based directly or indirectly on Old Church Slavonic. Their authors were motivated by the belief that all Slavic languages were dialects of one single Slavic language rather than separate languages. They deplored the fact that these dialects had diverged beyond mutual comprehensibility, and the language they envisioned was intended to reverse this process. Their long-term objective was that it would replace the individual Slavic languages.

Naturalistic projects have been created later as well. Notable examples are Mežduslavjanski jezik, an unpublished project from the years 1954–1958 by a team of Czech interlinguists; Slovianski, a collaborative project started in 2006; and Novosloviensky, based on Old Church Slavonic and published in 2010 by the Czech Vojtěch Merunka. In 2011, Slovianski and Novosloviensky merged into one common project under the name Interslavic (Medžuslovjansky), also incorporating material from older naturalistic projects.

Most naturalistic projects are so similar that they can easily be considered versions of the same language. During the 20th century, however, a few schematic projects have emerged as well, such as Slovanština (Edmund Kolkop, 1912), Neposlava (Vsevolod Cheshikhin, 1915), Slavski jezik (Bohumil Holý, 1920) and Slovio (Mark Hučko, 1999). These projects aim at radical simplification of the grammar, often combining Slavic vocabulary with Esperanto grammar.

== Pan-Germanic languages ==
Languages for Pan-Germanic use have been created as well. Examples include Tutonish, a Pan-Germanic project by Elias Molee (1902), which was intended to be an auxiliary language at first but to eventually supplant all other Germanic languages; Euronord, an effort by A.J. Pilgrim (1965); and Folkspraak, a heterogeneous project consisting of various dialects, started in 1995.

== Pan-Romance languages ==
Many international auxiliary languages intended for global use consist exclusively or predominantly of Latin and/or Romance material, like Latino sine flexione, Neolatino by André Schild (1947), Internacional by João Evangelista Campos Lima (1948), Interlingua (IALA), Latino Moderne by David Stark (1996), Interlingue, and Lingua Franca Nova, which makes it hard to distinguish them from Pan-Romance languages. Some languages, however, have been presented explicitly as languages for use among (or with) Romance speakers, including Romanid, Romanova by Richard Sorfleet and Josu Lavin (2001), the naturalistic Romance Neolatino by a group of linguists led by Jordi Cassany Bates (2012) and Latino Interromanico by Raymund Zacharias and Thiago Sanctus (2017).

== Other zonal constructed languages ==
Apart from these Indo-European examples, there have also been attempts on other language families:

- Efatese (19th century), an artificially mixed language based on the languages of Efate Island in Vanuatu.
- Palawa kani (1992) by the Tasmanian Aboriginal Centre. It is constructed from the vocabulary registered from the Tasmanian languages before their extinction. It is intended as an indigenous language for the descendants of the Aboriginal Tasmanians.
- Budinos (2000s), a language designed to be for communication between Finno-Ugric cultures
- Ortatürk / Öztürkçe (1992, 2008), a Pan-Turkic zonal auxiliary language, with statistically calculated vocabulary

Linguist Alan Reed Libert also lists languages for use by speakers of unrelated languages in a particular geographical area among the zonal languages, including:

- Guosa (intended as a common language for Nigeria)
- Afrihili (intended as a lingua franca for Africa)

== See also ==
- Dialect leveling
- Lingua franca

== Literature ==
- Heršak, Emil (2017). "Zonal Constructed Language Contacts and Positive Globalisation" (PDF). Open Journal for Anthropological Studies. 1: 1–12. doi:10.32591/coas.ojas.0101.01001h. ISSN 2560-5348.
- van Steenbergen, Jan (2020). "Zonal Auxiliary Languages" (PDF). The Role of Languages in Intercultural Communication / Rolo de lingvoj en interkultura komunikado / Rola języków w komunikacji międzykulturowej. Cross-linguistic and Cross-cultural Studies 1. Poznań: Wydawnictwo Rys: 41–48. doi:10.48226/978-83-66666-28-3. ISBN 978-83-66666-28-3.
