= Naturalistic planned language =

A naturalistic planned language is an a posteriori constructed language specifically devised to reproduce the commonalities in morphology and vocabulary from a group of closely related languages, usually with the idea that such a language will be easier to use passively – in many cases, without prior study – by speakers of one or more languages in the group.

The term most commonly applies to planned languages that are predominantly based on the Romance languages, best known of which are Interlingue (previously known as Occidental) and Interlingua. Both were designed to serve as international auxiliary languages. However, there are also languages intended for speakers of a particular language family (zonal constructed languages), including Pan-Romance, Pan-Germanic and Pan-Slavic naturalistic planned languages.

Since the creation of such a language includes shared idiosyncrasies from the source languages, active use seems to be generally more difficult to learn than for schematic planned languages, though because of grammatical simplification considerably easier than for ethnic languages of the same type.

According to Willem Anthony Veeloren Van Themaat, proponents of naturalistic planned languages argue that naturalistic planned languages are capable of being used as instruments of culture but schematic planned languages are not. The justification for this reasoning, he argues, is that naturalistic planned languages are able to carry the culture from their source languages while schematic planned languages are "purely rational, without cultural value, unable to express feeling" and "unsuitable for literature."

== See also ==
- Dialect levelling
- Language planning
- Language revitalization
- Lingua franca
- Interlinguistics
