= Brithenig =

Constructed language

- Brithenig, Comroig
- Pronunciation: [bɾɪθɛˈniːɡ]
- Created by: Andrew Smith
- Date: 1996
- Setting and usage: A thought experiment in alternate history, Ill Bethisad, if Latin had replaced the Brittonic languages
- Purpose: Indo-European: Italic; Romance; Western Romance; Britanno-Romance; Brithenig
- Sources: A posteriori Romance language constructed from Vulgar Latin with a Celtic substrate

Language codes
- ISO 639-3: bzt
- Glottolog: brit1244

Brithenig, also known as Comroig, is an invented language, or constructed language ("conlang"). It was created as a hobby in 1996 by Andrew Smith from New Zealand, who also invented the alternate history of Ill Bethisad to "explain" it. Officially according to the Ill Bethisad Wiki, Brithenig is classified as a Britanno-Romance language, along with other Romance languages that displaced Celtic.

Brithenig was not developed to be used in the real world, like Volapük, Esperanto, Interlingua or Interslavic, or to provide detail to a work of fiction, like Klingon from the Star Trek franchise. Rather, Brithenig started as a thought experiment to create a Romance language that might have evolved if Latin had displaced the native Celtic language as the spoken language of the people in Great Britain.

The result is an artificial sister language to French, Catalan, Spanish, Portuguese, Romanian, Occitan and Italian which differs from them by having sound-changes similar to those that affected Welsh, and words that are borrowed from the Brittonic languages and from English throughout its pseudo-history. One important distinction between Brithenig and Welsh is that Welsh is P-Celtic, but Latin was a Q-Italic language (as opposed to P-Italic, like Oscan), and the trait was passed onto Brithenig.

Similar efforts to extrapolate Romance languages are Breathanach (influenced by the other branch of Celtic), Judajca (influenced by Hebrew), Þrjótrunn (a non-Ill Bethisad language influenced by Icelandic), Venedic (influenced by Polish), and Xliponian (which experienced a Grimm's law-like sound shift). It has also inspired Wessisc, a hypothetical Germanic language influenced by contact with Old Celtic.

Brithenig was granted the code BZT as part of ISO 639-3.

Andrew Smith was one of the conlangers featured in the exhibit "Esperanto, Elvish, and Beyond: The World of Constructed Languages" displayed at the Cleveland Public Library from May through August 2008. Smith's creation of Brithenig was cited as the reason for his inclusion in the exhibit (which also included the Babel Text in Smith's language).

== Orthography ==
Brithenig orthography is similar to that of Welsh, except:

- Unlike Welsh, Brithenig has soft C and G; that is, before vowels e and i the consonants c and g are pronounced /tʃ/, /dʒ/, similar to Italian.
  - Brithenig also use such phonemes finally in letters c' and g'.
  - Hard G in Brithenig is indicated by gh as in Italian.
  - Similarly, when preceding e and i, sc is pronounced /ʃ/, otherwise /sk/.
- The letter k used for hard /k/ is much more alive in Brithenig than Welsh.
- While Welsh words are usually stressed in penultimate syllables, Brithenig words are stressed in the last syllable (Brithenig yscol vs. Welsh ysgol, both mean "school").
- It lacks complicated rules on predicting vowel length from orthography: stressed vowels are always pronounced long.
- Brithenig has numerous silent letters.
  - In words more than two syllables, word-final -t in the sequence -nt, and -r or -l as the second members of consonant clusters become silent.
  - Word-final -f generally silent, but not as an orthographically geminate -ff.
  - In the infinitive endings -ar, -er, -ir, the -r is usually unpronounced.
- Some speakers pronounce -ae and -oe as /aː/ and /oː/, respectively. In the standard variant, both vowels are pronounced as /aːɪ/ and /oːɪ/.
- Monosyllabic words ending in consonant clusters which end in -r or -l are pronounced with an epenthetic vowel same as the last vowel (llifr pronounced as llifir /ˈɬiːvɪɾ/, see above).

== Phonology ==
Consonant phonemes
Place Manner		Labial	Dental/ Alveolar	Post-alveolar/ Palatal	Velar	Glottal
Nasal		m	n			
Stop	Voiceless	p	t		k ⟨k, c⟩	
Stop	Voiced	b	d		ɡ ⟨g⟩	
Affricate	Voiceless			t͡ʃ ⟨c⟩		
Affricate	Voiced			d͡ʒ ⟨g⟩		
Fricative	Voiceless	f	s			h
Fricative	Voiced	v	z ⟨s⟩			
Approximant			l	j	w	
Trill			r			

Vowel phonemes (monophthongs)
	Front (unrounded)	Central	Back (rounded)
Close	i ⟨i, y⟩	ɨ ⟨u⟩	u ⟨w⟩
Near-close	ɪ ⟨i⟩		ʊ ⟨w⟩
Mid		ə ⟨a, e⟩	
Open-mid	ɛ ⟨e⟩		ɔ ⟨o⟩
Open	a		

Diphthongs
Digraph	Pronunciation
ae	[æ], [aː]
ai	[aɪ]
au	[aʊ]
ei	[ɛɪ]
ew	[ɛʊ]

== Grammar ==
=== Mutation ===
Like Welsh and other Celtic languages, initial consonant mutations (cluinediwn, lit. "declensions") in Brithenig is an important feature. Three mutations exist: soft (moillad), spirant (solwed), and nasal (naral).

Radical	Soft	Spirant	Nasal
p- /p/	b- /b/	ph- /f/	mh- /m̥/
t- /t/	d- /d/	th- /θ/	nh- /n̥/
c- /k, tʃ/	g- /ɡ/	ch- /χ/	ngh- /ŋ̊/
c- /k, tʃ/	g- /dʒ/		ngh- /ŋ̊/
b- /b/	f- /v/		m- /m/
d- /d/	dd- /ð/		n- /n/
g- /ɡ, dʒ/	∅- (silent)		ng- /ŋ/
m- /m/	f- /v/		not applicable
ll- /ɬ/	l- /l/		not applicable
rh- /r/	r- /ɾ/		not applicable

Soft mutation are used with feminine nouns, adjectives, verbs, change in word order, after an adverb, and prepositions di "of, from" and gwo "under". Spirant mutation are used for marking plurals on nouns, adjective, and verbs, but also after prepositions tra "through" and a "to, at", and the conjunction mai "but". Nasal mutation are used after the negative adverb used to negate verbs rhen, and prepositions in "in" and cun "with".

Before a vowel, the prepositions a "to, at" and e "and" irregularly became a-dd and e-dd.

Notation for mutation triggering
Soft	-^{x}	di^{x}	di bedd "of foot"
Spirant	-^{x}	tra^{x}	tra phedd "through foot"
Nasal	-^{x}	cun^{x}	cun mhedd "with foot"

=== Nouns and adjectives ===
Gender in Brithenig nouns is lexical and unpredictable, as it obscured by historic sound changes. The indefinite article in Brithenig is yn^{x} "one".

Definite articles
	Singular	Plural
Masculine	ill	llo^{x}
Feminine	lla^{x or x}	llo^{x}

Unlike Welsh with unpredictably-formed plurals, Brithenig has no dedicated separate plural suffix, thus, the singular and plural forms are almost always invariable (similar to transnumeral languages such as Indonesian and Korean). Instead, the plural definite article is generally placed before the noun (lla gas, llo chas), but yet some exceptions to this rule exist. Exceptions include the plural of (ill) of "man", (llo) h-on; and some plurals that formed by placing feminine singular definite article before it with spirant lenition (ill bordd, lla fordd).

Dual forms of natural pairs (e.g. arms, legs), however, have their own prefix and formed by prefixing dew- "two" to the nouns. The similar feature also occurs in Breton. Diminutives and augmentatives are derived by suffixing -ith (usual)/-in (affection/collective) and -un, respectively.

=== Pronouns ===
Person		Nominative	Accusative	Dative	Disjunctive	Possessive
Singular	1st	eo^{x}	mi		mui	mew
Singular	2nd	ty^{x}	ti		tui	tew
Plural	1st	nu^{x}				nustr
Plural	2nd	gw^{x}				gwstr
Both	3rd m.	ys^{x}	llo	lle	sui	sew
Both	3rd f.	sa^{x or x}	lla	lle	sui	sew

The third person has no distinction of numbers, but can be indicated by spirant lenition on succeeding nominals or verbs (before singulars the mutation is not used). Unlike nouns, pronouns are not just inflected for numbers, but also grammatical cases. Like many languages, Brithenig has a T–V distinction, with ty being used for addressing people whom the speaker is familiar with or gods, while Gw is used when speaking to a stranger or a less familiar or more formal acquaintance (with capitals). Before feminine nouns, the succeeding noun(s) exhibit soft mutation, while before plural the noun(s) exhibit spirant mutation. When mutated, ty and ti irregularly become dy^{x} to avoid confusion with di "of". Unlike Welsh, Brithenig makes fewer use of inflected prepositions, and such prepositions only found in the word cun "with":

	Singular	Plural
1st person	cunmeg	cunnusc
2nd person	cunneg	cungwsc
3rd person	cunseg	

=== Verbs ===
Similar to Spanish and Portuguese, Brithenig verbs are divided into 3 conjugations according to their infinitive endings: -ar (canhar "to sing"), -er (perdder "to lose"), and -ir (dorfir "to sleep") (note that the final -r are usually silent). Brithenig is a non-null-subject language, that is, it requires pronouns before the verb forms (ys cant "he sings"). Note that the stem's final consonants also undergo lenition, but also unvoiced final stop consonants become voiced in the imperfect, past definite, and subjunctive past plurals; future, and conditional forms (that in verbs like canhar those also undergo mutation as well).

Subjunctive forms nowadays only survive in fixed phrases, like can in Rhufein, ffâ si llo Rhufan ffeigant "when in Rome, do as the Romans do". Also in subjunctive present forms, final vowels are affected by i-affection (except in -ar verbs where it only happen in plural forms):

Unaffected	Affected
-a-	-ei-
-e-	-ei-
-o-	-ei-
-u-	-y-
-aw-	-ew-
-i-

==== Regular verbs ====
Canhar
infinitive			canhar						
present participle			canhan						
past participle			canhad						
person		singular				plural			
person		1st	2nd	3rd		1st	2nd	3rd	
		eo	tu	ys	sa	nu	gw	ys	sa
indicative	present	gant	gant	cant	gant	chanhan	chanhath	chanhant	
indicative	imperfect	ganhaf	ganhaf	canhaf	ganhaf	chanafan	chanafath	chanafant	
indicative	past definite	ganhaf	ganhast	canhaf	ganhaf	chanafan	chanast	chanarent	
indicative	future	ganarai	ganara	canara	ganara	chanaran	chanarath	chanarant	
indicative	conditional	ganarew	ganarew	canarew	ganarew	chanarewn	chanarewth	chanarewnt	
		eo	tu	ys	sa	nu	gw	ys	sa
subjunctive	present	gant	gant	cant	gant	cheinhen	cheinheth	cheinhent	
subjunctive	past	ganhas	ganhas	canhas	ganhas	chanassen	chanasseth	chanassent	
		eo	tu	ys	sa	nu	gw	ys	sa
imperative		cant (familiar), canhath (formal)							

Perdder
infinitive			perdder						
present participle			perdden						
past participle			perdded						
person		singular				plural			
person		1st	2nd	3rd		1st	2nd	3rd	
		eo	tu	ys	sa	nu	gw	ys	sa
indicative	present	berdd	berdd	perdd	berdd	pherdden	pherddeth	pherddent	
indicative	imperfect	berddef	berddef	perddef	pherddef	pherddefan	pherddefath	pherddefant	
indicative	past definite	berddef	berddest	perddef	berddef	pherddefan	pherddest	pherdderent	
indicative	future	berdderai	berddera	perddera	berddera	pherdderan	pherdderath	pherdderant	
indicative	conditional	berdderew	berdderew	perdderew	berdderew	pherdderewn	pherdderewth	pherdderewnt	
		eo	tu	ys	sa	nu	gw	ys	sa
subjunctive	present	beirdd	beirdd	peirdd	beirdd	pheirddan	pheirddath	pheirddant	
subjunctive	past	berddes	berddes	perddes	berddes	pherddessen	pherddesseth	pherddessent	
		eo	tu	ys	sa	nu	gw	ys	sa
imperative		perdd (familiar), perddeth (formal)							

Dorfir
infinitive			dorfir						
present participle			dorfin						
past participle			dorfid						
person		singular				plural			
person		1st	2nd	3rd		1st	2nd	3rd	
		eo	tu	ys	sa	nu	gw	ys	sa
indicative	present	ddorf	ddorf	dorf	ddorf	ddorfen	ddorfith	ddorfent	
indicative	imperfect	ddorfif	ddorfif	dorfif	ddorfif	ddorfifan	ddorfifath	ddorfifant	
indicative	past definite	ddorfif	ddorfist	dorfif	ddorfif	ddorfifan	ddorfist	ddorfirent	
indicative	future	ddorfirai	ddorfira	dorfira	ddorfira	ddorfiran	ddorfirath	ddorfirant	
indicative	conditional	ddorfirew	ddorfirew	dorfirew	ddorfirew	ddorfirewn	ddorfirewth	ddorfirewnt	
		eo	tu	ys	sa	nu	gw	ys	sa
subjunctive	present	ddeirf	ddeirf	deirf	ddeirf	ddeirfan	ddeirfath	ddeirfant	
subjunctive	past	ddorfis	ddorfis	dorfis	ddorfis	ddorfissen	ddorfisseth	ddorfissent	
		eo	tu	ys	sa	nu	gw	ys	sa
imperative		dorf (familiar), dorfith (formal)							

==== Irregular verbs ====
While the Brithenig conjugation is mostly regular, there are some irregular verbs. In past definite tense, some verbs have s-stem preterite originating from Latin perfect tenses in -x- or -s- (eo ddis from diger "to say" for example):

		Singular	Plural
1st person		ddis	ddisen
2nd person		ddisist	ddisist
3rd person	Masculine	dis	ddisirent
3rd person	Feminine	ddis	ddisirent

In past participles, instead of regular forms, some verbs have irregular participles inherited from Latin supines in -tum (facere, factum → fager, faeth "to do"), -sum (claudere, clausum → clodder, clos "to close"), or even combinations of them (vidēre, *vistum → gwidder, gwist "to see"). Some verbs also have irregular imperative forms, either by lengthening the last vowel and deleting last consonant (only in the case of familiar imperatives, diger, dî, digeth), or taking forms from subjunctive (saber, seib, seibeth). The verb gweddir "to go", where it comes from Latin vadō but it is not suppleted with other verbs, has irregularities in the present tense: eo wa, tu wa, ys wa, sa wa, nu wan, gw wath, ys/sa want.

===== Most irregular verbs =====
Irregular forms are underlined.

Esser "to be"
infinitive			esser						
present participle			essen						
past participle			ystad						
person		singular				plural			
person		1st	2nd	3rd		1st	2nd	3rd	
		eo	tu	ys	sa	nu	gw	ys	sa
indicative	present	su	es	es	es	sun	hes	sunt	
indicative	imperfect	er	er	er	er	h-eran	h-erath	h-erant	
indicative	past definite	ffew	ffewst	ffew	ffew	ffewns	ffewst	ffewrent	
indicative	future	serai	sera	sera	sera	seran	serath	serant	
indicative	conditional	serew	serew	serew	serew	serewn	serewth	serewnt	
		eo	tu	ys	sa	nu	gw	ys	sa
subjunctive	present	sia	sia	sia	sia	sian	siath	siant	
subjunctive	past	ffews	ffews	ffews	ffews	ffewssens	ffewsseth	ffewssent	
		eo	tu	ys	sa	nu	gw	ys	sa
imperative		sia (familiar), siath (formal)							

Afer "to have"
infinitive			afer						
present participle			afen						
past participle			afyd						
person		singular				plural			
person		1st	2nd	3rd		1st	2nd	3rd	
		eo	tu	ys	sa	nu	gw	ys	sa
indicative	present	ai	a	a	a	hafen	hafeth	hant	
indicative	imperfect	afef	afef	afef	afef	h-afefan	h-afefath	h-afefant	
indicative	past definite	afew	afewst	afew	afew	h-afewns	h-afewst	h-afewrent	
indicative	future	afrai	afra	afra	afra	afran	afrath	afrant	
indicative	conditional	afrew	afrew	afrew	afrew	afrewn	afrewth	afrewnt	
		eo	tu	ys	sa	nu	gw	ys	sa
subjunctive	present	ai	ai	ai	ai	aian	aiath	aiant	
subjunctive	past	afews	afews	afews	afews	h-afewssens	h-afewsseth	h-afewssent	
		eo	tu	ys	sa	nu	gw	ys	sa
imperative		ai (familiar), aiath (formal)							

=== Syntax ===
The default word order in Brithenig is subject–verb–object (SVO), overall syntax is similar to French but unlike Welsh. However, when the verb coexists with an object pronoun the word order changes to subject–object–verb. The word order for yes–no questions is verb–subject–object (gw pharolath Brithenig "you speak Brithenig" vs. parola'gw Frithenig? "are you speaking Brithenig?").

== Vocabulary ==
Most of Brithenig's vocabulary is distinctively Romance even though it is disguised as Welsh. This list of 30 words gives an impression of what Brithenig looks like in comparison to nine other Romance languages, including Wenedyk, and to Welsh. The similarity of about one quarter of the Welsh words to Brithenig words (indicated by not being bracketed) is because of their common Indo-European background, but a few others, such as ysgol, were borrowings from Latin into Welsh.

Brithenig compared with Romance and Welsh
English	Brithenig	Latin	Picard	Portuguese	Galician	Spanish	Catalan	Occitan	French	Italian	Rhaeto-Romance	Friulian	Romanian	Wenedyk	Welsh
arm	breich	brachium	bro	braço	brazo	brazo	braç	braç	bras	braccio	bratsch	braç	braţ	brocz	braich
black	nîr	nĭger, nĭgrum	noére	preto, negro	negro	negro	negre	negre	noir	nero	nair	neri	negru	niegry	(du)
city, town	ciwdad	cīvĭtās, cīvĭtātem	ville	cidade	cidade	ciudad	ciutat	ciutat	cité	città	citad	citât	oraş, [cetate]	czytać	(dinas)
death	morth	mŏrs, mŏrtem	mort	morte	morte	muerte	mort	mòrt	mort	morte	mort	muart	moarte	mroć	(marwolaeth)
dog	can	canis	quien	cão, cachorro	can	perro, can	gos, ca	gos, can	chien	cane	chaun	cjan	câine	kań	(ci)
ear	origl	auris, aurĭcŭla	orele	orelha	orella	oreja	orella	aurelha	oreille	orecchio	ureglia	orele	ureche	urzykła	(clust)
egg	ew	ovum	œué	ovo	ovo	huevo	ou	uòu	œuf	uovo	ov	ûf	ou	ów	wy
eye	ogl	ŏcŭlus	oeul	olho	ollo	ojo	ull	uèlh	œil	occhio	egl	voli	ochi	okieł	(llygad)
father	padr	pater, patrem	monpére	pai	pai	padre	pare	paire	père	padre	bab	pari	tată	poterz	(tad)
fire	ffog	ignis, fŏcus	fu	fogo	lume, fogo	fuego	foc	fuòc	feu	fuoco	fieu	fûc	foc	fok	(tân)
fish	pisc	pĭscis	pichon	peixe	peixe	pez, pescado	peix	peis	poisson	pesce	pesch	pes	peşte	pieszcz	pysgodyn
foot	pedd	pĕs, pĕdem	pied	pé	pé	pie	peu	pè	pied	piede	pe	pît	picior, [piez]	piedź	(troed)
friend	efig	amīcus	anmi	amigo	amigo	amigo	amic	amic	ami	amico	ami	amì	prieten, amic	omik	(cyfaill)
green	gwirdd	vĭrĭdis	vert	verde	verde	verde	verd	verd	vert	verde	verd	vert	verde	wierdzi	gwyrdd
horse	cafall	ĕquus, cabăllus	gval	cavalo	cabalo	caballo	cavall	caval	cheval	cavallo	chaval	cjaval	cal	kawał	ceffyl
I	eo	ĕgo	J'/euj	eu	eu	yo	jo	ieu	je	io	jau	jo	eu	jo	(mi)
island	ysl	īnsŭla	ile	ilha	illa	isla	illa	iscla	île	isola	insla	isule	insulă	izła	(ynys)
language, tongue	llinghedig, llingw	lĭngua	lingue	língua	lingua	lengua	llengua	lenga	langue	lingua	linguatg, lieunga	lenghe	limbă	lęgwa	(iaith)
life	gwid	vīta	vie	vida	vida	vida	vida	vida	vie	vita	vita	vite	viaţă, [vită]	wita	(bywyd)
milk	llaeth	lac, lactis	lé	leite	leite	leche	llet	lach	lait	latte	latg	lat	lapte	łoc	llaeth
name	nôn	nōmen	nom	nome	nome	nombre	nom	nom	nom	nome	num	non	nume	numię	(enw)
night	noeth	nŏx, nŏctem	nuit	noite	noite	noche	nit	nuèch	nuit	notte	notg	gnot	noapte	noc	(nos)
old	gwegl	vĕtus, vĕtŭlus	viu	velho	vello	viejo	vell	vièlh	vieux	vecchio	vegl	vieli	vechi	wiekły	(hen)
school	yscol	schŏla	école	escola	escola	escuela	escola	escòla	école	scuola	scola	scuele	şcoală	szkoła	ysgol
sky	cel	caelum	ciu	céu	ceo	cielo	cel	cèl	ciel	cielo	tschiel	cîl	cer	czał	(awyr)
star	ystuil	stēlla	étoéle	estrela	estrela	estrella	estel	estela	étoile	stella	staila	stele	stea	ścioła	(seren)
tooth	dent	dēns, dĕntem	dint	dente	dente	diente	dent	dent	dent	dente	dent	dint	dinte	dzięć	dant
voice	gwg	vōx, vōcem	voé	voz	voz	voz	veu	votz	voix	voce	vusch	vôs	voce, [boace]	wucz	(llais)
water	ag	aqua	ieu	água	auga	agua	aigua	aiga	eau	acqua	aua	aghe	apă	jekwa	(dŵr)
wind	gwent	vĕntus	vint	vento	vento	viento	vent	vent	vent	vento	vent	vint	vânt	więt	gwynt

== See also ==
- British Latin
