= Venedic language =

Naturalistic constructed language

Venedic
- Wenedyk
- Created by: Jan van Steenbergen
- Date: 2002
- Setting and usage: A thought experiment in the alternate history, Ill Bethisad, if Latin had replaced Polish's ancestor.
- Purpose: Constructed language: Artistic languages; Fictional languages; Venedic
- Sources: constructed languages a posteriori languages (Romance language with a Polish substrate)

Language codes
- ISO 639-3: None (mis)
- Glottolog: None
- IETF: art-x-wenedyk

Venedic (Wenedyk, lęgwa wenedka) is a naturalistic constructed language, created by the Dutch translator Jan van Steenbergen (who also co-created the international auxiliary language Interslavic). It is used in the fictional Republic of the Two Crowns, based on the Polish–Lithuanian Commonwealth, in the alternate timeline of Ill Bethisad. Officially, Venedic is a descendant of Vulgar Latin with a strong Slavic admixture, based on the premise that the Roman Empire incorporated the ancestors of the Poles in their territory. Less officially, it tries to show what Polish would have looked like if it had been a Romance instead of a Slavic language. On the Internet, it is well-recognized as an example of the altlang genre, much like Brithenig and Breathanach.

The idea for the language was inspired by such languages as Brithenig and Breathanach, languages that bear a similar relationship to the Celtic languages as Venedic does to Polish. The language itself is based entirely on (Vulgar) Latin and Polish: all phonological, morphological, and syntactic changes that made Polish develop from Common Slavic are applied to Vulgar Latin. As a result, vocabulary and morphology are predominantly Romance in nature, whereas phonology, orthography and syntax are essentially the same as in Polish. Venedic uses the modern standard Polish orthography, including ⟨w⟩ for /v/ and ⟨ł⟩ for /w/.

Venedic plays a role in the alternate history of Ill Bethisad, where it is one of the official languages of the Republic of the Two Crowns. In 2005 Venedic underwent a major revision due to a better understanding of Latin and Slavic sound and grammar changes. In the process, the author was assisted by the Polish linguist Grzegorz Jagodziński.

The dictionary on the WWW page linked below contains over 4000 entries.

The language has acquired some media attention in Poland, including several online news articles and an article in the monthly Knowledge and Life.

== Spelling and pronunciation ==
Venedic uses the Polish alphabet, which consists of the following 32 letters :

A Ą B C Ć D E Ę F G H I J K L Ł M N Ń O Ó P R S Ś T U W Y Z Ź Ż

Also, there are seven digraphs, representing five phonemes (ch being identical with h, and rz with ż):

Ch Cz Dz Dź Dż Rz Sz

Pronunciation is exactly as in Polish. Stress almost always falls on the penultimate syllable. A preposition and a pronoun are generally treated as one word, and therefore, when the pronoun has only one syllable, the preposition is stressed.

(In theory, the construction of Venedic enables relatively easy construction of other "Slavo-Romance" languages. The Romance "mirror" for Czech, for example, is called "Šležan"; another for Slovak, although somewhat looser than the other two as it uses a partially Hungarian orthography, is called "Slevan". )

== Nominals ==
Venedic does not have articles. This is a feature that distinguishes Venedic from all natural Romance languages. The reason for this is that Vulgar Latin showed only a rudimentary tendency toward the formation of articles, and they are absent in Polish and most other Slavic languages.

Nouns, pronouns and adjectives can have three genders (masculine, feminine, neuter), two numbers (singular, plural), and three cases:

- the direct case: used for both the subject and the direct object of a sentence. In the sentence: Miej poterz leże libier "My father reads a book", Miej poterz "my father" and libier "a book" are both in the direct case.
- the genitive case: used to indicate possession, for example: siedź potrze "my father's chair", rzejna Anglie "the queen of England".
- the dative case: used to indicate the indirect object of a sentence, for example: Da mi ił libier "Give me that book", Da mi łu "Give it to me".

Venedic also has a vocative case. In most cases it has the same form as the direct case, but there are exceptions: O potrze! "Oh father!" In earlier version of Venedic, it used to have nominative and accusative cases, but later merged to form the direct case.

Nouns can be subdivided into four declensions. They are similar to the declension system in Latin:

- The first declension are all words on -a, the vast majority of which are feminine;
- the second declension are mostly masculine and neuter words ending with a consonant. It is a mixture of the second and fourth declension in Latin;
- the third declension are mostly feminine words ending with a soft consonant;
- the fourth declension are words on -ej, it matches the Latin fifth declension. However, the author treated the nouns with the 4th declension ending as irregular, see also the sections below.

=== Declension endings ===
Declension class		I				II				III			
Declension class		f		m		m		n		f		n	
Declension class		hard	soft	hard	soft	hard	soft	hard	soft	hard	soft	hard	soft
Singular	Direct	-a				-∅							
Singular	Genitive	-ie				-u	-ie	-u	-ie				
Singular	Dative	-ie				-ia							
Plural	Direct	-ie		-i, -ie^{1}				-ia		-ie		-ia	
Plural	Genitive	-ar		-ór						-i^{2}			
Plural	Dative	-iew											

1. The ending -i is used for male persons, while -ie is used for objects or animals instead.
2. In some cases, -iar is used in the place of -i, and sometimes both endings is used.

Hard and soft in this context are suffixes that are decided by final consonants, either hard (remaining consonants, like -n, -c, or -d) or soft (postalveolars or palatal-like sounds, like -l, -ń, or -rz). Endings in -ia-, -ie-, and -i- are always affected by regular changes below:

Final consonant	Result		
Final consonant	+ -ia-	+ -ie-	+ -i-
c	ca	ce	cy
ch	sza	sze	szy
cz	cza	cze	czy
ć	cia	cie	ci
d	dzia	dzie	dzi
dz	dza	dze	dzy
g	ża	że	ży
k	cza	cze	czy
j	ja	je	i
ł	la	le	li
ń	nia	nie	ni
r	rza	rze	rzy
sk	szcza	szcze	szczy
sz	sza	sze	szy
t	cia	cie	ci
ż	ża	że	ży
ź	zia	zie	zi

An example of noun declension: moszkieł "man" (2nd decl.)
	Singular	Plural
Direct	moszkieł /ˈmɔʂkʲɛw/	moszkli /ˈmɔʂklʲi/
Genitive	moszkłu /ˈmɔʂkwu/	moszkłór /ˈmɔʂkwur/
Dative	moszkli /ˈmɔʂklʲi/	moszklew /ˈmɔʂklɛf/

=== Irregular nouns ===
There are a number of irregular nouns. Not just completely irregular nouns on the table below, some nouns have less predictable oblique stems (the rest stem other than nominative singular), as in above moszkieł, gen. moszklu. However, nouns with the last vowel ó regularly shorten to o (sórz, sorze).

	numię "name"^{1}		ciępu "time"^{1}		fołgr "lightning"^{1}	
	Singular	Plural	Singular	Plural	Singular	Plural
Direct	numię	numna	ciępu	cięprze	fołgr	fołgra
Genitive	numien	numnie	cięprze	ciępr	fołgrze	fołgr
Dative	numni	numniew	cięprzy	cięprzew	fołgrzy	fołgrzew

	dziew "god"		womień "person"^{2}		kap "head"	
	Singular	Plural	Singular	Plural	Singular	Plural
Direct	dziew	dziei	womień	ludzie	kap	kapta
Genitive	dzieju	dziejór	womnie	ludzi	kapcie	kaptór
Dative	dziei	dziejew	womni	ludziew	kapci	kapciew
	rzej "head"		dzej "day"		Jezus "Jesus"	
	Singular	Plural	Singular	Plural	Singular	
Direct	rzej	rzeje	dzej	dzeje	Jezus	
Genitive	rzei	rzejar	dzei	dzejór	Jezu	
Dative	rzei	rzejew	dzei	dzejew	Jezui	

1. There are some other nouns that follow these irregular nouns' patterns (krzymię "crime" < numię, fiodu "treaty" < ciępu, marmr "marble" < fołgr). Some treat these nouns are separate patterns of the third declension, while others consider them irregular.
2. Like the plural suppletion of "person" in many Slavic languages, the plural form ludzie is suppletive and it is borrowed from Proto-Slavic ľudьje.

=== Adjectives ===
Adjectives always agree in gender, number and case with the noun they modify. They can be placed both before and after it. Unlike nouns, the adjective declension are always consistent and there is no distinctions in declension classes.

		Singular			Plural		
		Masculine	Neuter	Feminine	Masculine	Neuter	Feminine
Hard
Direct	Non-personal	-y		-a	-ie		
Direct	Personal	-y		-a	-i	-ie	
Genitive		-u		-iej	-ór		-ar
Dative		-i		-iej	-iew		
Soft
Direct	Non-personal	-i		-ia	-ie		
Direct	Personal	-i		-ia	-i	-ie	
Genitive		-iu		-iej	-iór		-iar
Dative		-i		-iej	-iew		

==== Further derivatives of adjectives ====
The comparatives and superlatives are formed by the suffixes -ierzy and -ieśmy, respectively, to the adjective's stem. However, the adjectives below have irregular comparative (second row) and superlative (third row) forms:

- bony "good", mielerzy, oćmy
- mały "bad", piejerzy, pieśmy
- grędzy "big", mojerzy, mośmy
- łonięcy "far", łonierzy, łonieśmy
- pieskły "small", mnierzy, mnieśmy
- wiekły "old", wieszczerzy, wieszcześmy
- jałty "high", sprzerzy, sprześmy
- mołt "many/much", pły "more", płerześmy "most"

Adverbial forms are either done by removing the -y/-i from the root or adding the suffix -mięć into the root (kłary, kłar/kłaramięć "warmly"). There are no rules which forms are preferred, but the latter usually expresses how something is done.

For the longer form, -amięć is used after hard consonants while -iemięć used after soft consonants. Adjectives in -ły use the suffix -lemięć (i.e. -ł- + -iemięć), except for the adjectives biały, mały, miły, siegły which are always suffixed with the former (biały → białamieć). The adjective bony "good" has an irregular adverbial derivation: bień. The comparatives and superlatives can also have adverbial forms, by substituting -ierzy and -ieśmy with -iu and -ieśmie. Verbal participles always remove their last vowels.

The predicative forms are the same as masculine and neuter direct singular forms, except that sometimes the suffix -y/-i is removed, but this predicative forming is somewhat archaic and the resulting forms should not be confused with adverbs.

=== Pronouns ===
Unlike nouns, adjectives and other pronouns, personal pronouns do not use the direct case, but preserve the distinction between the nominative and accusative instead. They are displayed in the following chart:

Pronouns
	singular					plural				
	first person	second person	third person			first person	second person	third person		
	first person	second person	masculine	feminine	neuter	first person	second person	masculine	feminine	neuter
Nom. Acc. Gen. Dat.	jo mie miej mi	ty cie ciej ci	ił łu łu li	ła łą lej lej	łu łu łu li	nu nosz nosz nów	wu wosz wosz wów	li łosz łór lew	le łasz łar lew	le le łór lew
English	I me mine to me	thou, you thee, you thine, yours to thee, to you	he him his to him	she her hers to her	it it its to it	we us ours to us	you you yours to you	they them theirs to them		

== Verbs ==
Verbs are inflected for person, number, mood and tense. Because Latin and Proto-Slavonic had virtually identical person/number inflections, Venedic and Polish do also.

Venedic verbs have the following moods and tenses:

infinitive – jemar "to love"
present tense – jemu "I love, I am loving"
imperfect – jemawa "I loved"
perfect – jemie " I have loved"
future tense (imperfective) – joru jemar "I will love, I will be loving"
future tense (perfective) – jemaru "I will have loved"
conditional mood – jemarsi "I would love, I would have loved"
imperative mood – jem "love!"
present active participle – jemęć "loving"
perfect passive participle – jematy "beloved"

=== Regular verbs ===
Present tense
Person ↓		Classes			
Person ↓		I	II—VI	VII	VIII
Singular	1st	-u	-je	-u	-sku
Singular	2nd	-asz	-esz		-szczesz
Singular	2nd	-a	-e		-szcze
Plural	1st	-amy	-iemy	-my	-szczemy
Plural	2nd	-acie	-ecie	-cie	-szczecie
Plural	3rd	-ą	-ję	-ę	-ską

== Word list ==
Venedic vocabulary as published on the internet consists of over 4000 words. Because of how it was developed from Vulgar Latin, Venedic words are closest to Italian, but with phonologic differences from Italian which may be compared to those distinguishing Portuguese from Spanish. The following charts of 30 shows what Venedic looks like in comparison to a number of other Romance languages; note that unlike Brithenig, where one-quarter of the words resembled Welsh words, only four Venedic words (not counting szkoła, borrowed into Polish from Latin) resemble Polish words, due to the Slavic languages' greater distance from the Romance languages compared to the Celtic languages:

Venedic compared to Latin, Italian, Polish, and Romanian
Term	Latin	Italian	Wenedyk	Romanian	Polish
arm	brachium	braccio	brocz	braţ	ramię
black	nĭger, nĭgrum	nero	niegry	negru	czarny
city, town	cīvĭtās, cīvĭtātem	città	czytać	oraş, [cetate]	miasto
death	mŏrs, mŏrtem	morte	mroć	moarte	śmierć
dog	canis	cane	kań	câine	pies
ear	auris, aurĭcŭla	orecchio	urzykła	ureche	ucho
egg	ovum	uovo	ów	ou	jajko
eye	ŏcŭlus	occhio	okieł	ochi	oko
father	pater, patrem	padre	poterz	tată	ojciec
fire	ignis, fŏcus	fuoco	fok	foc	ogień
fish	pĭscis	pesce	pieszcz	peşte	ryba
foot	pĕs, pĕdem	piede	piedź	picior, [piez]	stopa
friend	amīcus	amico	omik	prieten, amic	przyjaciel
green	vĭrĭdis	verde	wierdzi	verde	zielony
horse	ĕquus, cabăllus	cavallo	kawał	cal	koń
I	ĕgo	io	jo	eu	ja
island	īnsŭla	isola	izła	insulă	wyspa
language, tongue	lĭngua	lingua	lęgwa	limbă	język
life	vīta	vita	wita	viaţă, [vită]	życie
milk	lac, lactis	latte	łoc	lapte	mleko
name	nōmen	nome	numię	nume	imię
night	nŏx, nŏctis	notte	noc	noapte	noc
old	vĕtus, vetulus	vecchio	wiekły	vechi	stary
school	schŏla	scuola	szkoła	şcoală	szkoła
sky	caelum	cielo	czał	cer	niebo
star	stēlla	stella	ścioła	stea	gwiazda
tooth	dĕns, dĕntem	dente	dzięć	dinte	ząb
voice	vōx, vōcem	voce	wucz	voce, [boace], glas	głos
water	aqua	acqua	jekwa	apă	woda
wind	vĕntus	vento	więt	vânt	wiatr

Wenedyk compared to other Romance languages
Term	Portuguese	Spanish	Catalan	Occitan	French	Romansh	Wenedyk	Brithenig
arm	braço	brazo	braç	braç	bras	bratsch	brocz	breich
black	negro	negro	negre	negre	noir	nair	niegry	nîr
city, town	cidade	ciudad	ciutat	ciutat	cité	citad	czytać	ciwdad
death	morte	muerte	mort	mòrt	mort	mort	mroć	morth
dog	cão	perro	gos	gos, can	chien	chaun	kań	can
ear	orelha	oreja	orella	aurelha	oreille	ureglia	urzykła	origl
egg	ovo	huevo	ou	uòu	œuf	ov	ów	ew
eye	olho	ojo	ull	uèlh	œil	egl	okieł	ogl
father	pai	padre	pare	paire	père	bab	poterz	padr
fire	fogo	fuego	foc	fuòc	feu	fieu	fok	ffog
fish	peixe	pez	peix	peis	poisson	pesch	pieszcz	pisc
foot	pé	pie	peu	pè	pied	pe	piedź	pedd
friend	amigo	amigo	amic	amic	ami	ami	omik	efig
green	verde	verde	verd	verd	vert	verd	wierdzi	gwirdd
horse	cavalo	caballo	cavall	caval	cheval	chaval	kawał	cafall
I	eu	yo	jo	ieu	je	jau	jo	eo
island	ilha	isla	illa	illa	île	insla	izła	ysl
language, tongue	língua	lengua	llengua	lenga	langue	linguatg, lieunga	lęgwa	llinghedig, llingw
life	vida	vida	vida	vida	vie	vita	wita	gwid
milk	leite	leche	llet	lach	lait	latg	łoc	llaeth
name	nome	nombre	nom	nom	nom	num	numię	nôn
night	noite	noche	nit	nuèch	nuit	notg	noc	noeth
old	velho	viejo	vell	vièlh	vieux	vegl	wiekły	gwegl
school	escola	escuela	escola	escòla	école	scola	szkoła	yscol
sky	céu	cielo	cel	cèl	ciel	tschiel	czał	cel
star	estrela	estrella	estrella	estela	étoile	staila	ścioła	ystuil
tooth	dente	diente	dent	dent	dent	dent	dzięć	dent
voice	voz	voz	veu	votz	voix	vusch	wucz	gwg
water	água	agua	aigua	aiga	eau	aua	jekwa	ag
wind	vento	viento	vent	vent	vent	vent	więt	gwent

== Sample text ==
The Lord's Prayer in Venedic:

Potrze nostry, kwały jesz en czałór, sąciewkaty si twej numię. Owień twej rzeń. Foca si twa włątać, komód en czału szyk i sur cierze. Da nów odzej nostry pań kocidzany. I dziemieć nów nostrze dziewta, komód i nu dziemiećmy swór dziewtorzór. I nie endycz nosz en ciętaceń, uta liwra nosz dzie mału. Nąk twie są rzeń i pociestać i głurza, o siąprz. Amen.

Article 1 of the Universal Declaration of Human Rights in Venedic:

Tuci ludzie noszczę sie liwrzy i jekwali z rześpiece świej dzińtacie i swór drzecór. Li są dotaci ku rocenie i koszczęce i dziewię ocar piara wyniałtru en jenie frotrzeńtacie.

Article 1 of the Universal Declaration of Human Rights in English:

All human beings are born free and equal in dignity and rights. They are endowed with reason and conscience and should act towards one another in a spirit of brotherhood.

== Similar languages ==
In the Ill Bethisad universe, there are two other languages which are related to Venedic: Slevan, which is spoken in that universe's counterpart of Slovakia; and Šležan, or Silesian, spoken in Silesia. Šležan mirrors Czech in much the same way Venedic does Polish, whereas Slevan, despite being located in Slovakia, is more similar to Hungarian and Croatian in its orthography. (The Romance "mirror" of Slovak is a dialect of Slevan spoken in Moravia called Moravľaňec.) (As if in compensation, Croatian in Ill Bethisad is forced to be noticeably different from Serbian by being made to resemble the now-virtually-missing Czech and Slovak. )

Additionally, in the famous The Adventures of Tintin series, the pseudo-Slavic fictional language Syldavian may be thought of as a Germanic counterpart of Venedic. The nearly extinct Wymysorys language provides another real-life example of this. Ill Bethisad also has such a "Slavo-Germanic" language: Bohemian, spoken in that universe's Czech Republic, developed by amateur Czech linguist Jan Havliš.

== Citations ==
=== Bibliography ===
- Tilman Berger, Vom Erfinden Slavischer Sprachen, in: M. Okuka & U. Schweier, eds., Germano-Slavistische Beiträge. Festschrift für P. Rehder zum 65. Geburtstag, München 2004, pp. 19–28. Cites Venedic as an example of Slavic-based extrapolated conlangs.
- Michał Foerster, Wariacje literackie: o językach, in: Esencja, no. 07/2008 (LXXIX), August–September 2008.
- Dorota Gut, : Now@ Mow@ ("New Language"), in: Wiedza i Życie, February 2004.
- Jakub Kowalski, Wymyślone języki, on: Relaz.pl, 2 March 2007.
- Stefan Michael Newerkla, "Auf den Spuren des ř in den slawischen Sprachen und rund um den Globus", in: Johannes Reinhart & Tilmann Reuther, eds., Ethnoslavica: Festschrift für Herrn Univ. Prof. Dr. Gerhard Neweklowsky zum 65. Geburtstag; Beiträge des internationalen Symposiums des Instituts für Slawistik der Universität Klagenfurt in Zusammenarbeit mit dem Institut für Slawistik der Universität Wien, Klagenfurt, 7.-8. April 2006, München-Wien: Otto Sagner, 2006, p. 212.
- Paul J.J. Payack, A Million Words and Counting: How Global English Is Rewriting the World, 2008, p. 193.
- Romance glossary. A list of common words in all Romance languages, including Venedic and Brithenig.
