= Pan-Slavic language =

Type of constructed language

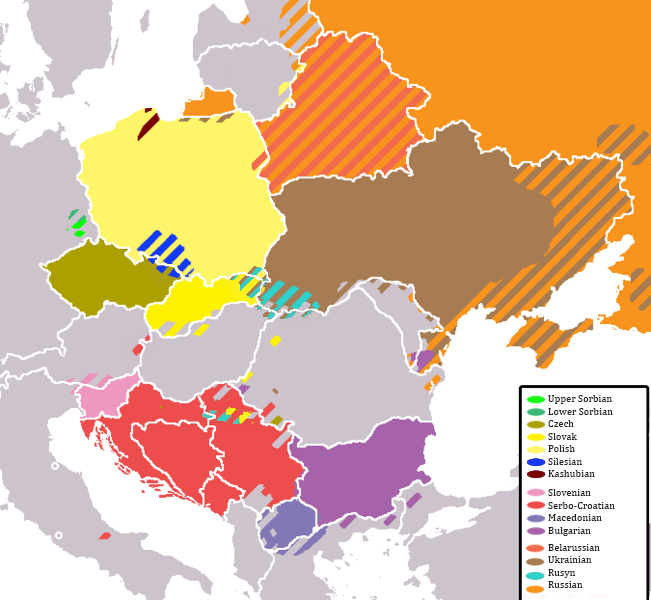
Linguistic map of Slavic languages

A pan-Slavic language is a zonal auxiliary language for communication among the Slavic peoples.

There are approximately 400 million speakers of the Slavic languages. In order to communicate with each other, speakers of different Slavic languages often resort to international lingua francas, primarily English or Russian. But since Slavic languages are closely related lexically and grammatically and are comparatively easier to learn when another Slavic language is already known, there have been numerous attempts to construct a more neutral auxiliary language that could act as a common language for slavophones. The earliest pan-Slavic linguistic efforts preceded academic knowledge and reconstruction of Proto-Slavic, which was likely spoken between 2nd century BCE and 6th century CE, from which all Slavic languages developed in following centuries.

== History ==
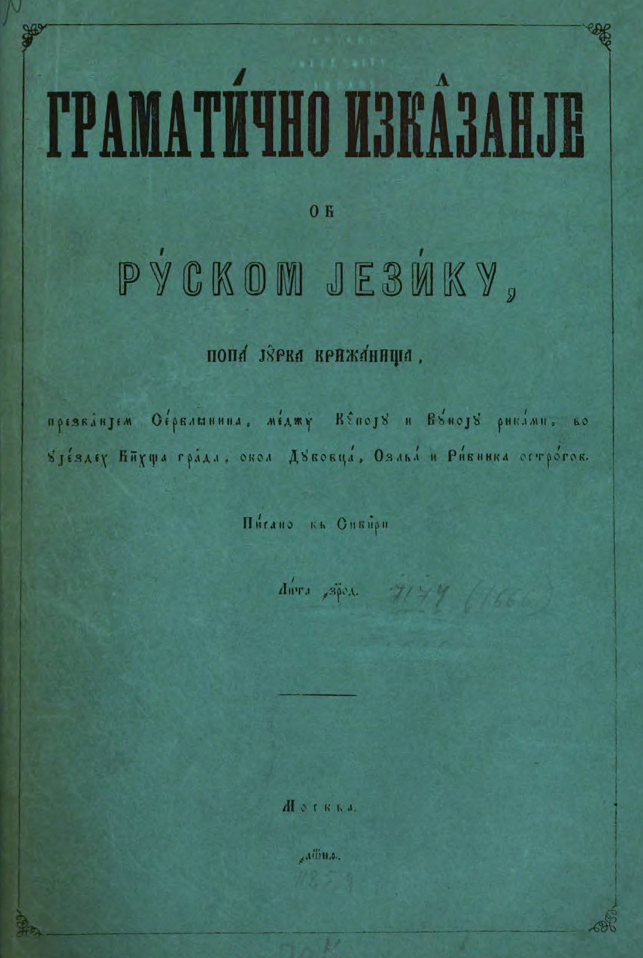
Cyrillic edition of Gramatíčno izkâzanje ob rúskom jezíku (1665) by Križanić, the first pan-Slavic grammar book

The history of zonal Slavic languages is closely connected with Pan-Slavism, an ideology that endeavors cultural and political unification of all Slavs, based on the conception that all Slavic people are part of a single Slavic nation. Along with this belief came also the need for an umbrella Slavic language. The strongest candidate for that position among modern languages is Russian, the language of the largest Slavic state. This option enjoys most of its popularity in Russia itself, but has also been favoured by some Pan-Slavists abroad, for example the Slovak Ľudovít Štúr. Others have proposed that Old Church Slavonic would be a better and more neutral solution. In previous centuries, Old Church Slavonic had served as an administrative language across a large part of the Slavic world, and it is still used on a large scale in Eastern Orthodox liturgy, where it plays a role similar to Latin in the West. Old Church Slavonic has the additional advantage of being similar to the common ancestor of the Slavic languages, Proto-Slavic. However, it has several practical disadvantages as well: its grammar is complex, and its vocabulary is characterized by many words that have been lost from the modern languages, as well as an absence of words for modern concepts. Hence, early pan-Slavic language projects aimed at modernizing Old Church Slavonic and adapting it to the needs of everyday communication.

=== Early projects ===
The first pan-Slavic grammar, Gramatíčno izkâzanje ob rúskom jezíku by the Croatian priest Juraj Križanić, was written in 1665. He referred to the language as Ruski jezik ("Russian language"), but in reality it was mostly based on a mixture of the Russian edition of Church Slavonic and his own Southern Chakavian dialect of Croatian. Križanić used it not only for this grammar, but also in other works, including the treatise Politika (1663–1666). According to an analysis of the Dutch Slavist Tom Ekman, 59% of the words used in Politika are of common Slavic descent, 10% come from Russian and Church Slavonic, 9% from Croatian and 2.5% from Polish.

Križanić was not the first who attempted writing in a language understandable to all Slavs. In 1583 another Croatian priest, Šime Budinić, had translated the Summa Doctrinae Christanae by Petrus Canisius into Slovignsky, in which he used both the Latin and Cyrillic alphabets.

After Križanić, numerous other efforts have been made to create an umbrella language for the speakers of Slavic languages. A notable example is Universalis Lingua Slavica by the Slovak attorney Ján Herkeľ (1786–1853), published in Latin in 1826. Unlike Križanić' project, this project was closer to the West Slavic languages.

During the second half of the 19th century Pan-Slavic language projects were mostly the domain of Slovenes and Croats. Among the numerous efforts at creating written standards for the South Slavic languages there were also efforts at establishing a common South Slavic language, Illyrian, that might also serve as a literary language for all Slavs in the future. Of special importance is the work of Matija Majar (1809–1892), a Slovenian Austroslavist who later converted to Pan-Slavism. In 1865 he published Uzajemni Pravopis Slavjanski ("Mutual Slavic Orthography"). In this work, he postulated that the best way for Slavs to communicate with other Slavs was by taking their own language as a starting point and then modifying it in steps. First, he proposed changing the orthography of each individual language into a generic ("mutual") Pan-Slavic orthography, subsequently he described a grammar that was based on comparing five major Slavic languages of his days: Old Church Slavonic, Russian, Polish, Czech and Serbian. Apart from a book about the language itself, Majar also used it for a biography of Cyril and Methodius and for a magazine he published in the years 1873–1875, Slavjan. A fragment in the language can still be seen on the altar of Majar's church in Görtschach. Other Pan-Slavic language projects were published in the same period by the Croatian Matija Ban, the Slovenes Radoslav Razlag and Božidar Raič, as well as the Bulgarian Grigor Parlichev – all based on the idea of combining Old Church Slavonic with elements from the modern South Slavic languages.

Authors of Pan-Slavic language projects in the 19th century

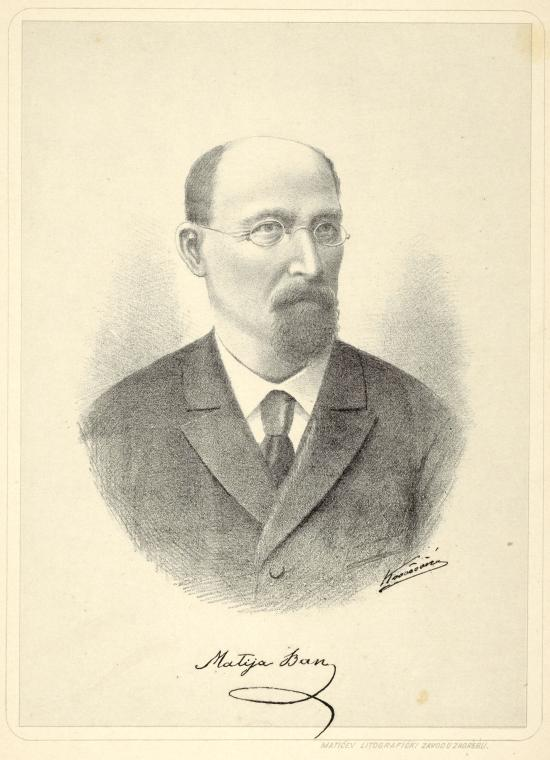
Matija Ban
(1818–1903)

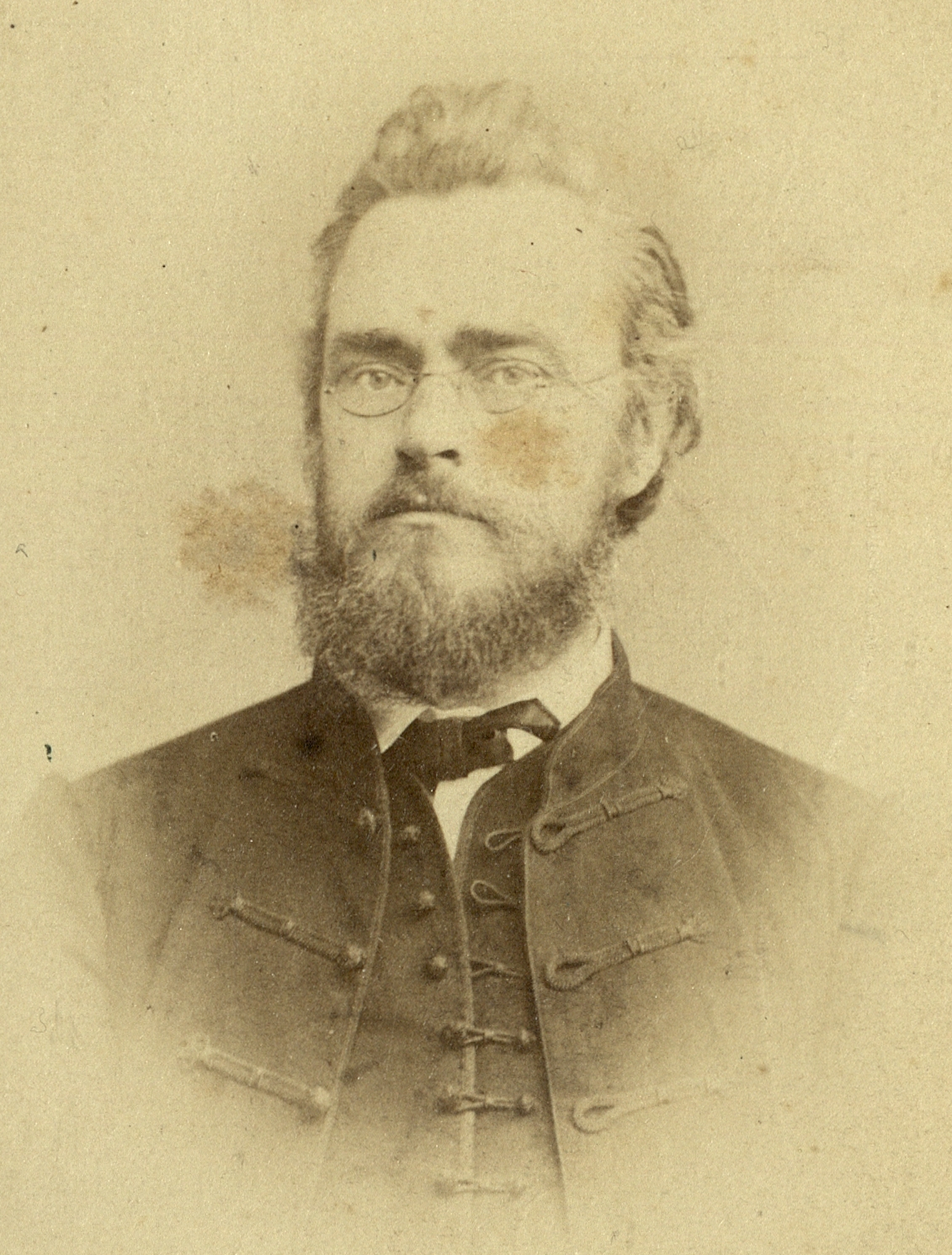
Radoslav Razlag
(1826–1880)

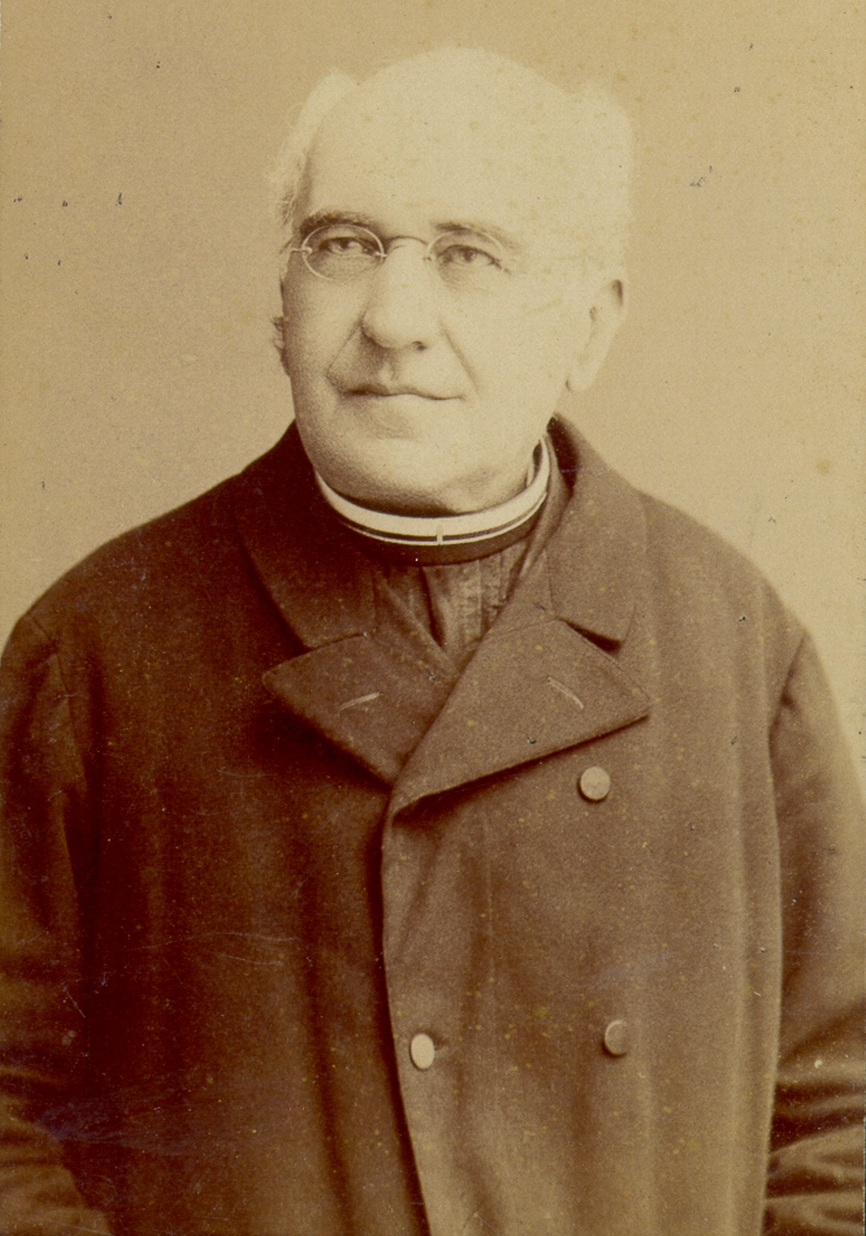
Božidar Raič
(1827–1886)

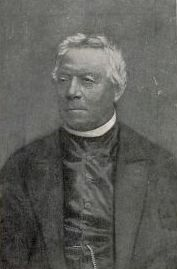
Matija Majar-Ziljski
(1809–1892)

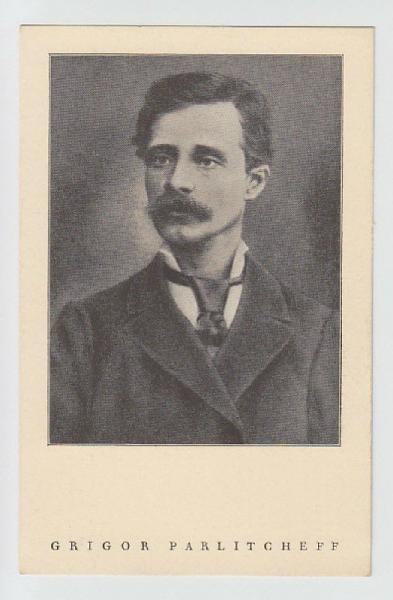
Grigor Parlichev
(1830–1893)

All authors mentioned above were motivated by the belief that all Slavic languages were dialects of one single Slavic language rather than separate languages. They deplored the fact that these dialects had diverged beyond mutual comprehensibility, and the Pan-Slavic language they envisioned was intended to reverse this process. Their long-term objective was that this language would replace the individual Slavic languages. Majar, for example, compared the Pan-Slavic language with standardized languages like Ancient Greek and several modern languages:

The ancient Greeks spoke and wrote in four dialects, but nevertheless they had one single Greek language and one single Greek literature. Many modern educated nations, for example the French, the Italians, the English and the Germans, have a higher number of more divergent dialects and subdialects than we Slavs, and yet they have one single literary language. What is possible for other nations and what really exists among them, why should this be impossible only for us Slavs?

— Matija Majar, Sveta brata Ciril i Metod, slavjanska apostola i osnovatelja slovstva slavjanskoga (1864)

Consequently, these authors did not consider their projects constructed languages at all. In most cases they provided grammatical comparisons between the Slavic languages, sometimes but not always offering solutions they labelled as "Pan-Slavic". What their projects have in common that they neither have a rigidly prescriptive grammar, nor a separate vocabulary.

=== The twentieth century ===
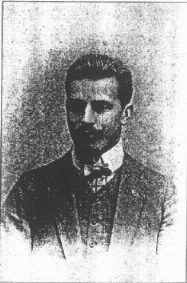
Bohumil Holý (1885–1947)

In the early 20th century it had become clear that the divergence of the Slavic languages was irreversible and the concept of a Pan-Slavic literary language was no longer realistic. The Pan-Slavic dream had lost most of its power, and Pan-Slavists had to satisfy themselves with the formation of two multinational Slavic states, Czechoslovakia and Yugoslavia. However, the need for a common language of communication for Slavs was still felt, and due to the influence of constructed languages like Esperanto, efforts were made to create a language that was no longer supposed to replace the individual Slavic languages, but to serve as an additional second language for pan-Slavic communication.

In the same period, the nexus of pan-Slavic activity shifted to the North, especially to the Czech lands. In 1907 the Czech dialectologist Ignác Hošek (1852–1919) published a grammar of Neuslavisch, a proposal for a common literary language for all Slavs within the Austro-Hungarian Monarchy. Five years later another Czech, Josef Konečný, published Slavina, a "Slavic Esperanto", which however had very little in common with Esperanto, but instead was mostly based on Czech. Whereas these two projects were naturalistic, the same cannot be said about two other projects by Czech authors, Slovanština by Edmund Kolkop and Slavski jezik by Bohumil Holý. Both projects, published in 1912 and 1920 respectively, show a clear tendency towards simplification, for example by eliminating grammatical gender and cases, and schematicism.

During the 1950s the Czech poet and former Esperantist Ladislav Podmele (1920–2000), also known under his pseudonym Jiří Karen, worked for several years with a team of prominent interlinguists on an elaborate project, Mežduslavjanski jezik ("Interslavic language"). Among other things, they wrote a grammar, an Esperanto–Interslavic word list, a dictionary, a course and a textbook. Although none of those were ever published, the project gained some attention of linguists from various countries. Probably due to the political reality of those days, this language was primarily based on Russian.

=== The digital age ===
Although Pan-Slavism has not played a role of any significance since the collapse of the Soviet Union and Yugoslavia, globalization and new media like the Internet have led to a renewed interest in a language that would be understandable for all Slavs alike. After the fall of the USSR, the role of the Russian language as a lingua franca in Eastern Europe and the Balkans diminished, also because many inhabitants of other countries in the region perceived it as the language of their former oppressor. Older projects were largely forgotten, but as it became relatively easy for authors to publish their work, several new projects emerged, mostly in Slavic émigrée circles. Thus, during the first years of the 21st century projects appeared under names like Slovo, Glagolica, Proslava and Ruslavsk. Most of them were incomplete and abandoned by their authors after a while.

The only project that acquired some fame in the same period was Slovio of the Slovak Mark Hučko. Unlike most previous projects it was not a naturalistic, but a schematic language, its grammar being based almost entirely on Esperanto. In addition, it was a fully functional language, and it became the first pan-Slavic language with a small user community. Slovio was not only intended to serve as an auxiliary language for Slavs, but also for use on a global scale like Esperanto. For that reason it gained little acceptance among Slavs: a high degree of simplification, characteristic for most international auxiliary languages, makes it easier to learn for non-Slavs, but widens the distance with the natural Slavic languages and gives the language an overly artificial character, which by many is considered a disadvantage. Hučko maintained a proprietary hold on Slovio, and since 2011 the language is no longer being developed and is effectively defunct, although a Reddit community was created for it in 2026.

Partly in response to the problems of Slovio, a more naturalistic and community-based project was started in 2006 under the name Slovianski by a group of people from different countries. Initially, it was being developed in three grammar versions: a naturalistic version by Jan van Steenbergen, a more simplified, pidgin-like version by Ondrej Rečnik and a schematic version by Gabriel Svoboda, but in 2009 it was decided that only the naturalistic version would be continued under the name Slovianski. Slovianski was mostly used in Internet traffic and in a news letter, Slovianska Gazeta. In 2012, its user community numbered several hundreds of people.

An effort to bring Slovianski and Slovio together resulted in Slovioski in 2009. Its original purpose was to provide Slovio with a more naturalistic grammar, but gradually it developed into a separate language project. Like Slovianski, it was a collaborative project that existed in two variants: a "full" and a simplified version. Another project that saw the light in the same period was Novoslověnsky ("Neoslavonic") by the Czech Vojtěch Merunka, based on Old Church Slavonic grammar but using part of Slovianski's vocabulary.

In 2011, Slovianski, Slovioski and Novoslověnsky were merged under the name Interslavic (Medžuslovjanski). In 2017 and 2018 Interslavic conferences took place in the Czech Republic, and in 2019 the language was featured in Václav Marhoul's movie The Painted Bird. By July 2021, its user community on Facebook had grown to over 15,000 people.

== Individual projects ==
=== Early Modern ===
==== Šime Budinić ====
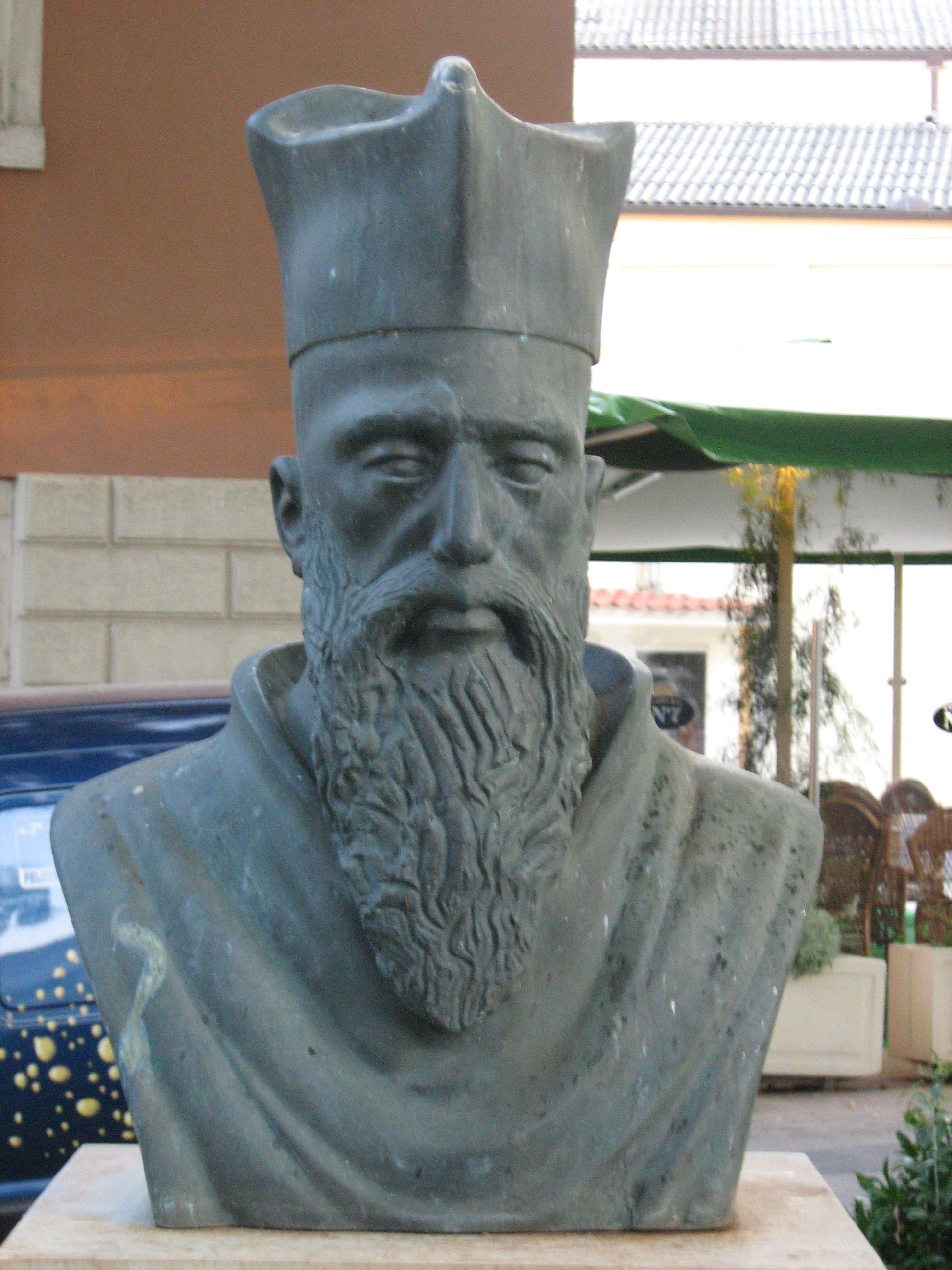
Šime Budinić (ca. 1530–1600)

As early as 1583, the Venetian-Croatian priest writer Šime Budinić from Zadar translated Petrus Canisius' Summa doctrinae christinae into a language he called Slovignsky or Slouignsky iazik ("Slavic language"), using both the Latin and the Cyrillic alphabets. Budinić did not actually give a description of this language, but according to some authors it was a mixture of Serbo-Croatian, Church Slavonic, Czech, and Polish. However, Nicolina Trunte argues that Church Slavonic, Polish or Czech were not used in the work at all, and that the language Budinić used was merely Shtokavian-Ijekavian with a number of hyper-Ijekavisms and Chakavisms.

Sample:

Koie iz Vlasskoga, illi Latinskoga iazika, v Slouignsky Iazik protumačio iest pop Ssimvn Bvdineo Zadranin.
"Translated from the Italian or Latin language into the Slavic Language by father Šimun Budinić from Zadar."

==== Juraj Križanić ====
In Siberia in 1666, the Croat Juraj Križanić wrote Gramatíčno izkâzanje ob rúskom jezíku (Граматично исказанје об руском језику "Grammatical overview of the Russian Language"). In this work he described in fact not the Russian language but a Common Slavonic language based on different Slavic languages, mostly on Russian and Chakavian Croatian. The author used it not only for this grammar, but also in other works, including the treatise Politika (1663–1666). According to an analysis of the Dutch Slavist Tom Ekman, 59% of the words used in Politika are of common Slavic descent, 10% come from Russian and Church Slavonic, 9% from Croatian and 2.5% from Polish.

Sample (Romanized, original in Cyrillic):

Iazika sowerszenost iest samo potrebno orudie k mudrosti, i iedwa ne stanowito iee zname. Czim kiu narod imaet izradney iazik, tim prigodnee i witwornee razprawlyaet remestwa i wsakije umitelyi i promisli. Obilie besedi i legota izgowora mnogo pomagaet na mudrich sowetow izobretenie i na wsakich mirnich i ratnich del leznee obwerszenie.

=== Modern ===
==== Ján Herkeľ ====
Another early example of a zonal language for Slavs was Universalis Lingua Slavica ("Universal Slavic language" or "All-Slavic language"). It was created and published by the Slovak attorney Ján Herkeľ (1786–1853) in his work Elementa universalis linguae Slavicae in 1826. Unlike languages like Esperanto, it had no well-defined grammar and no vocabulary of its own. Like many other pan-Slavists in the 19th century, Herkeľ considered the Slavic languages dialects of a single Slavic language, and his book is mostly a comparative grammar of these dialects, in which he sometimes offered grammatical solutions explicitly characterized by him as "Universal Slavic".

Although Herkeľ found Cyrillic more suitable for the Slavic languages, he nevertheless chose the Latin alphabet for his project, with the addition of a few Cyrillic letters: ч and ш for č and š (remarkably, for ž he preferred ƶ, although he explicitly did not exclude Cyrillic ж either), as well as x for h/ch.

Near the end of his book, Herkeľ gave a few examples of his Stylus Universalis, applied to the "Pannonian" (Slovak) dialect:

Za starego vieku byla jedna kralica, koja mala tri prelepije dievice: milicu, krasicu a mudricu; vse tri byle bogate, okrem bogatstva milica byla pokorna, krasica uctiva, a mudrica umena.
"In olden times there was a queen who had three very beautiful girls: Kindness, Beauty, and Wisdom; all three were rich, in addition to being rich Kindness was humble, Beauty was polite, and Wisdom was wise."

==== Slavina ====
Slavina was created by Josef Konečný in 1912 in Prague and published in the same year in a booklet titled Mluvnička slovanského esperanta "Slavina". According to the author, its main purpose was to serve as a communication tool in trade and industry. The subtitle of the language, "a Slavic Esperanto" (or its Esperanto translation "Slava Esperanto"), is sometimes erroneously cited as the name of the language, but in reality the language had very little in common with Esperanto. Instead, it was a clear example of a naturalistic language, with three grammatical genders, seven noun cases and five verbal tenses. Although Konečný claimed his language was based on all Slavic languages, it bore a striking similarity to his native Czech, both orthographically, phonologically, lexically and morphologically. Particularly unusual for a pan-Slavic language project was the distinction between long and short consonants.

The first sentence from the song Hey, Slavs:

Hej, Slované, naši lepo slovanó rěč máme, dokud naše věrné srece pro náš národ dáme.
"Hey, Slavs, we will have our beautiful Slavic language, as long as we give our faithful heart for our people."

==== Slovanština ====
Slovanština (Czech for "Slavic language") is the oldest example of a schematic language for pan-Slavic use. It was published in 1912 by the Czech linguist and esperantist Edmund Kolkop (1877–1915) in his booklet Pokus o dorozumívací jazyk slovanský. Kolkop had no political, pan-Slavic ambitions but felt frustrated by the fact that Slavs had to resort to German for their communication and believed that they would be helped with a simple, artificially created Slavic language, for which he took Esperanto as an example. The language had no grammatical gender and no cases, all nouns and adjectives ended in a consonant, plurals were formed with -a for nouns and -i for adjectives, and verbs were conjugated only for tense. Slavic word roots were derived regularly from Church Slavonic, and international vocabulary was used when a Slavic word was hard to find. The language was written in the Latin alphabet with a few unusual additions: ſ for š, з for ž, ч for č, y for j, j for ť, θ for ď and ι for ň.

The Gospel of Matthew, 3:1–2:

Ve tamji dιa priideo Yan Krestar, kazaya na puſj ve zem Yudesk; i rekaya: Pokayaιiy nehaj vi чiιi, bo pribliзio sa carstviy nebesk.
"In those days John the Baptist came, preaching in the wilderness of Judea; and saying: Repent, for the kingdom of heaven has come near."

==== Neposlava ====
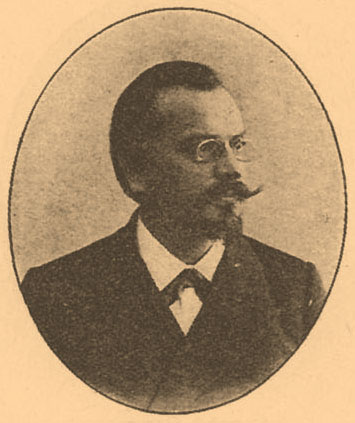
Vsevolod Cheshikhin (1865–1934)

Neposlava was an unpublished project, created by the Russian writer, publicist and music critic Vsevolod Yevgrafovich Cheshikhin (Всеволод Евграфович Чешихин) in Nizhny Novgorod, Russia. It was based on a system created by him in 1913 to construct zonal languages based on Esperanto affixes which are used with national roots and called it Nepo. According to that principle, he created Neposlava ("Slavic Nepo"), a Nepo-language based on Russian, Polish, Czech and Serbian lexicon, in 1915 or 1916. It is unknown how elaborated this language project really was. He also used this system to construct other "new Esperantoes" based on Latin-Romance and Germanic languages.

A fragment from the Lord's Prayer:

Vatero nia, kotoryja estas in la njebov, heiligia estu nomo via.
"Our father, who art in heaven, hallowed be thy name."

==== Mežduslavjanski jezik ====
Mežduslavjanski jezik ("Interslavic language") was an elaborate project worked on during the years 1954–1958 in Czechoslovakia by a group of interlinguists, led by the poet Ladislav Podmele a.k.a. Jiří Karen (1920–2000) and the pedagogue Jaroslav Podobský (1895–1962), both of whom were prominent members of the Occidental movement. Their idea was that four zonal languages (an inter-Germanic, an inter-Romance, an inter-Slavic and an inter-Indic language) together would enable two thirds of the world's population to communicate with each other. The language they created used grammatical and lexical features of various Slavic languages, primarily Russian and Czech, and may be viewed as a naturalistic planned language. They wrote a grammar (Kratka grammatika mežduslavjanskego jezika), an Esperanto–Interslavic word list, a dictionary, a course, a textbook and a few longer texts, practically none of which were ever published. Nevertheless, the project gained some attention of linguists from various countries.

An excerpt from the manuscript Revolucija v istoriji interlingvistiki:

Do tego casu bila aktivnost za meždunarodni jezik osnovana na principach utopizma, jež ždal si jedinego jezika za ves mir bez vzgleda na fakt, cto taki jezik ne može bit v nikakim pripadu rezultatem realnego razvoja jezikov živich, cto on bude vsegda tolika vidumana, spekulativna konstrukcija.
"To date, activity for an international language has been based on principles of utopianism, which endeavoured one language for the whole world without regard to the fact that such a language can in no way result from real development of living languages, that it wil always be an invented, speculative construction."

==== Slovio ====
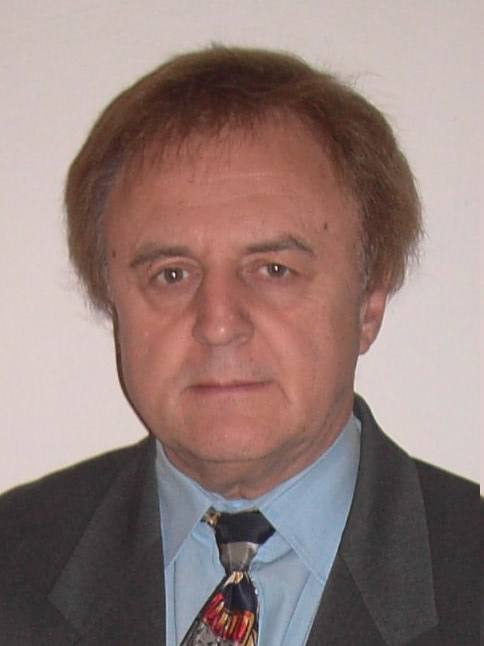
Mark Hučko

One of the first projects in the digital era was Slovio, a project created in 1999 and published in 2001 by the Slovak Mark Hučko. Unlike previous projects, Slovio was not only intended to serve as a pan-Slavic language, but also to compete with languages like Esperanto and Ido as a global international auxiliary language. In the guestbook section of the official Slovio website, Mark also writes that he designed Slovio as a language easy for foreigners to learn, to help descendants of those Slavs who had moved abroad and lost their roots, unable to speak a Slavic language. Most of Slovio's vocabulary was based on Slavic roots, but its grammar was almost entirely based on Esperanto, with an emphasis on simplicity. Verb conjugations were regular apart from the four verbs es ("be"), mozx ("can"), hce ("want"), dolzx ("must"). Adjectives ended in -ju or -(e)sk, the nouns formed their plural in -s or -is, and the only case was the accusative in -f or -uf (plural: -fs or -ifs) with -m or -um (plural -im) proposed for genitive and used in some of Mark Hučko's example texts. Slovio could be written in Latin or Cyrillic, but was typically written in Latin, with digraphs in x replacing the haček (e.g. zx for ž). Although the haček letters were listed as an option for use on the Slovio website, Mark Hučko himself did not use it in any of his example tests.

Slovio was the first Slavic-based constructed language with a substantial dictionary and a small user community, at its peak consisting of 10–15 users (mostly diaspora Slavs) and a number of interested bystanders. In spite of heavy marketing on the part of its creator, Slovio gained little support; it was heavily criticized for its artificial, un-Slavic character and the radical Slavic-nationalist views expressed by its users. Perhaps due to Hučko's insistence on owning the language and his hostile attitude towards proposed changes (similar to the situation with Volapük), people interested in a pan-Slavic language moved on to other projects. It became defunct by about 2011. In 2026, a Reddit community and new music was created in and about Slovio by the user "Own_Theory8011".

The Lord's Prayer in Slovio, as translated by Mark Hučko on the Slovio homepage's text collection, transliterated to cyrillic and using haček:

Наш отец ктор ес ом небес, свиатйу ес твои имен. Твои кроление придиб. Твои вола бу на Земла такак ом небес. Дарий намс наш денйу хлеб. И упростий намс наш гречис такак ми упростиме тамктор грехийут проти намс. И не вестий намс во покусение, но спасий намс от зло.
Naš otec ktor es om nebes, sviatju es tvoi imen. Tvoi krolenie pridib. Tvoi vola bu na Zemla takak om nebes. Darij nams naš denju hleb. I uprostij nams naš grehis takak mi uprostime tamktor grehijut proti nams. I ne vestij nams vo pokusenie, no spasij nams ot zlo.
"Our Father who art in heaven, Hallowed be thy name. Thy kingdom come. Thy will be done in earth, as it is in heaven. Give us this day our daily bread. And forgive us our trespasses, as we forgive those who tresspass against us. And lead us not into temptation, but deliver us from evil."

==== Slovianski ====
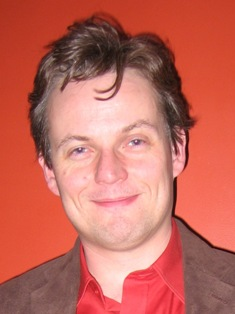
Jan van Steenbergen

To address the problems of Slovio, a community-based project called Slovianski was begun in 2006. Its main purpose was to create a simple, naturalistic language that would be understandable to Slavs without prior learning. This was approached with a voting system to choose words for the lexicon and a grammar consisting of material existing in all or most Slavic languages, without any artificial additions. Slovianski was developed in different versions. The version of its principal author, Jan van Steenbergen, had three genders (masculine, feminine, neuter), six cases and full conjugation of verbs. A high level of simplification was achieved by means of simple, unambiguous endings and irregularity being kept to a minimum.

Slovianski was mostly used in Internet traffic and in a news letter, Slovianska Gazeta. In 2012, the language was reported to have several hundreds of speakers.

The Lord's Prayer in Slovianski:

Naš otec, ktori jesi v nebah, da svečene je tvoje imeno, da prijde tvoje krolevstvo, da bude tvoja volia, kak v nebah tak i na zemie. Hleb naš každodenni daj nam tutden', i izvinij nam naše grehi, tak kak mi izvinime naših grešnikov, i ne vedij nas v pokušenie, ali spasij nas od zlogo.
"Our Father in heaven, hallowed be your name. Your kingdom come, your will be done, on earth as it is in heaven. Give us this day our daily bread, and forgive us our debts, as we also have forgiven our debtors. And lead us not into temptation, but deliver us from evil."

==== Slovioski ====
In 2009, Slovioski (a portmanteau of Slovio and Slovianski) was launched with the idea of bringing together both language projects. Its initial purpose was merely to provide Slovio with a more Slavic grammar (for example, by substituting the adjective ending -ju with -ij and the plural ending -is with -i), but gradually, it developed into a separate language project, widening its distance to Slovio and abandoning the Slovio dictionary in 2010. After Slovianski was reworked into Interslavic, Slovioski was discontinued.

==== Neoslavonic ====
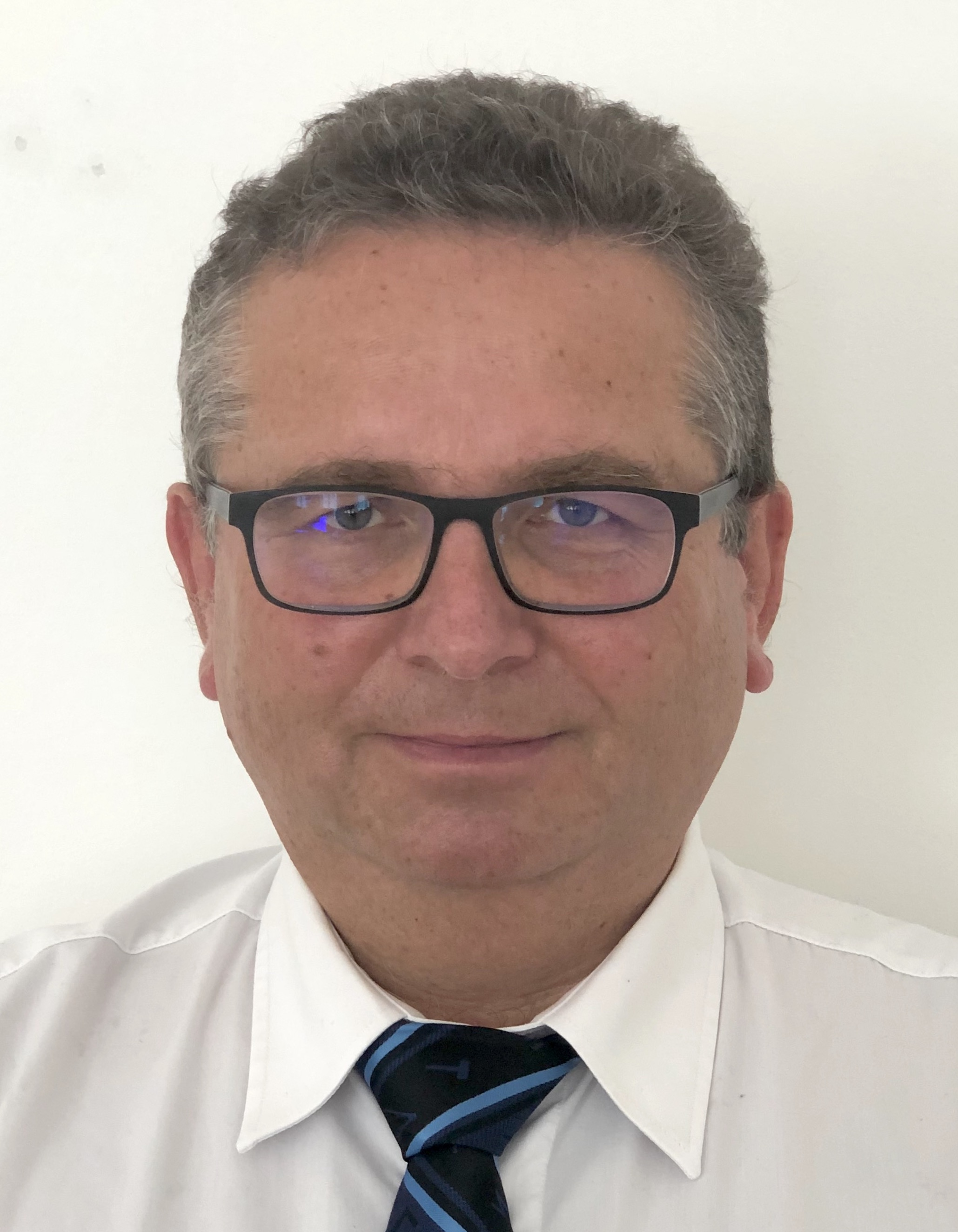
Vojtěch Merunka

Novoslovienskij ("Neoslavonic") was published in a 128-page book by the Czech pedagogue and programmer Vojtěch Merunka as a study of what Old Church Slavonic might look like today if it had not stopped developing in the Middle Ages. As a result, Neoslavonic had a complex grammar characterized by various archaisms, for example: four types of past tense, dual, seven cases and the Cyrillic letter ѣ, but on the other hand, it contained few exceptions and a relatively small number of repetitive rules. Neoslavonic could be written in four alphabets, Latin, Cyrillic, Greek and Glagolitic.

Example:

Uvažimi gospodi! Tu jest projekt jezyka novoslovienskego. Prošu Vas, da byste jego čitali i poslali Vašim prijateljam, jako li oni hočut to vidieti.
"Dear Sirs! Here is the Neoslavonic language project. I ask you to read it and send it to your friends if they want to see it."

=== Contemporary pan-Slavic ===
In 2011, Slovianski was renamed Medžuslovjanski ("Interslavic"), and its grammar and dictionary were revised to include all options of Neoslavonic and several older projects. A close collaboration was started between them, resulting in a common dictionary, a common news portal and a common wiki, and during the years to follow, Medžuslovjanski and Novoslovienskij (soon renamed Novoslověnsky) gradually grew closer to each other. As a result, most differences between both projects vanished in a natural way. After the first Conference on the Interslavic Language in 2017, Merunka and Van Steenbergen eliminated the last few remaining differences, and in the same year they published a unified grammar and orthography together, soon to be followed by a multilingual online dictionary covering English and most modern Slavic languages. Medžuslovjansky jezyk gained attention from the media and in 2019 came to be featured in the film The Painted Bird. For the first time in history, a Pan-Slavic language received an ISO 639-3 code, with 'isv' assigned for Interslavic in April 2024.

== See also ==
- Pan-Slavism
- Proto-Slavic, the common ancestor of all Slavic languages
- Army Slavic
- Slavonic-Serbian
- Iazychie
- Interslavic
- Lydnevi
