= Ján Herkeľ =

Slovak attorney and writer (1786–1853)

Ján Nepomuk Herkeľ
- Born: 1786; Vavrečka, Orava region, Kingdom of Hungary in present day Slovakia
- Died: 1853 (aged 66–67); Budapest

Ján Nepomuk Herkeľ (1786–1853) was a Slovak attorney and writer.

Herkeľ was born at Vavrečka, Kingdom of Hungary. He was the creator of Universalis Lingua Slavica, an early auxiliary language for Slavs.

== Selected works ==
- 1826 - Elementa universalis linguae Slavicae
