= Vojtěch Merunka =

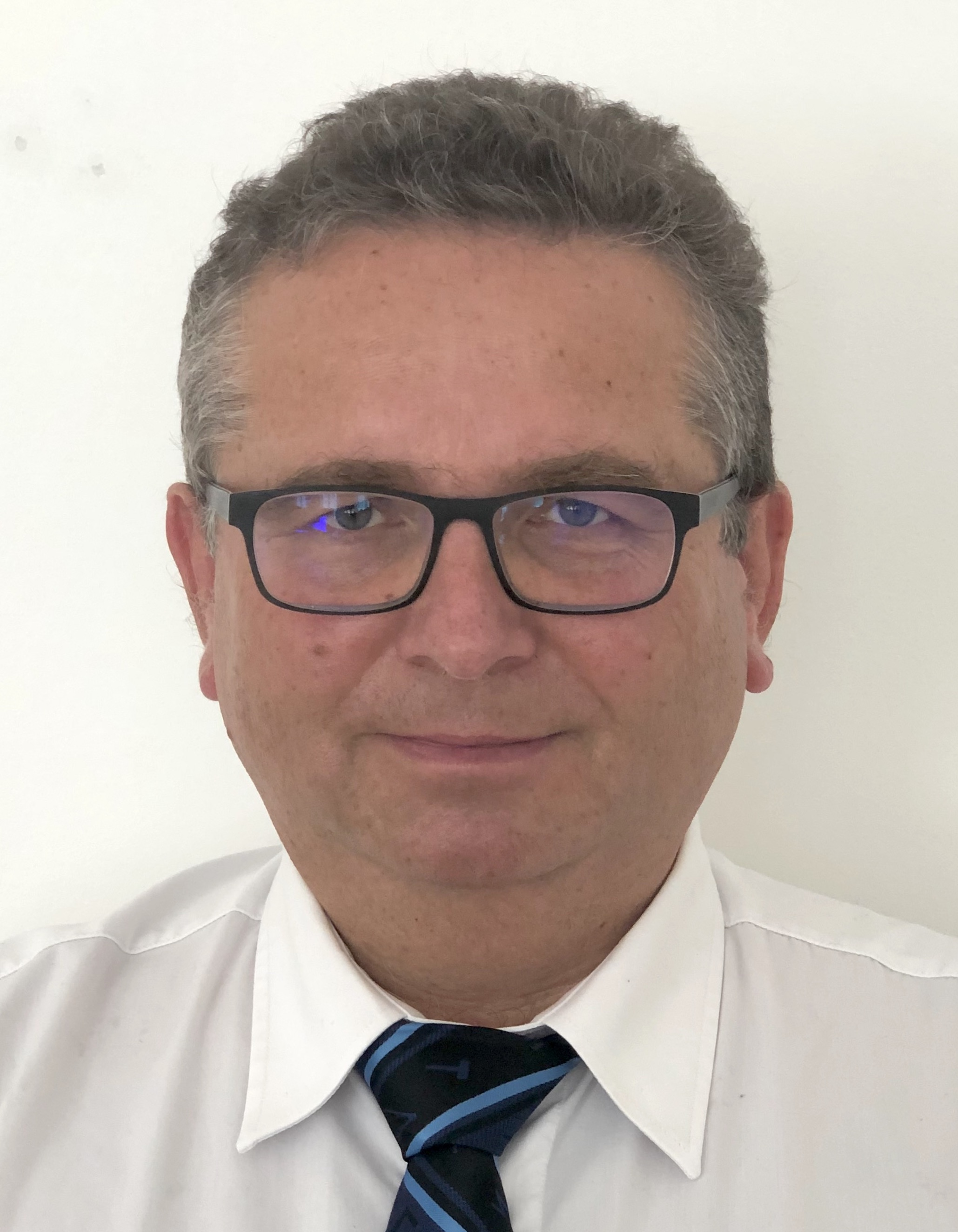
Merunka in 2019

Vojtěch Merunka (born 13 March 1967) is a Czech computer scientist and university professor. He is an expert in the field of object-oriented programming, an author for specialist publications, an author and promoter for his own constructed Slavic language, Interslavic, later a co-author together with the Dutch linguist Jan van Steenbergen.

== Life ==
Vojtěch Merunka was born in 1967 in Čáslav, Czechoslovakia. He completed a degree in computer electronics at the Czech Technical University in Prague (ČVUT) after having studied at a local grammar school. He obtained a doctoral degree in data processing and mathematical modeling, and is a lecturer in information management and software engineering at the Czech University of Life Sciences Prague and at the ČVUT.

Vojtěch Merunka is the founder of the international conference Objekty which has been held since 1995, focusing on object-oriented programming.

He is the chairman of the Slavic Union (Slovanská unie) in the Czech Republic since 2015.

In the 2019 European Parliament election in the Czech Republic he was the candidate number eight of the list Alternativa pro Českou republiku 2017 (APAČI 2017; English: Alternative for the Czech Republic), however he was not elected.

He worked on Václav Marhoul's film The Painted Bird which was nominated for best foreign language film at the 2019 Academy Awards. It was filmed predominantly in Interslavic, the language he co-constructed.
