= Interslavic =

Pan-Slavic language

- Medžuslovjansky/Međuslovjańsky; Меджусловјанскы
- Flag of the Interslavic language
- Created by: Ondrej Rečnik, Gabriel Svoboda, Jan van Steenbergen, Igor Polyakov, Vojtěch Merunka, Steeven Radzikowski
- Date: 2006
- Setting and usage: Auxiliary language for communication between speakers of different Slavic languages
- Ethnicity: Slavs
- Users: 7,000 (2020) ~ 20,000 (2022)
- Purpose: Constructed language: Naturalistic planned language; International auxiliary language; Zonal auxiliary language; Pan-Slavic language; Interslavic
- Writing system: Latin, Cyrillic, Glagolitic
- Sources: Old Church Slavonic, modern Slavic languages

Official status
- Regulated by: Interslavic Committee

Language codes
- ISO 639-3: isv
- Glottolog: inte1263
- IETF: isv

Interslavic (Medžuslovjansky / Меджусловјанскы) is a pan-Slavic auxiliary language. Its purpose is to facilitate communication between speakers of various Slavic languages, as well as to allow people who do not speak a Slavic language to communicate with Slavic speakers by being mutually intelligible with most, if not all, Slavic languages. For Slavs and non-Slavs, it can be used for educational purposes as well. Its use spans a broad range of fields, including tourism and education.

Interslavic can be classified as a semi-constructed language. It is essentially a modern continuation of Old Church Slavonic, and also draws on the various improvised language forms that Slavs have used for centuries to communicate between nationalities, for example in multi-Slavic environments and on the Internet, providing them with a scientific base. Thus, both grammar and vocabulary are based on common elements between the Slavic languages. Its main focus lies on instant intelligibility rather than easy learning, a balance typical for naturalistic (as opposed to schematic) languages.

The Interslavic project began in 2006 under the name Slovianski. In 2011, Slovianski underwent a thorough reform and merged with two other projects, with the result called "Interslavic", a name that was first proposed by the Czech Ignác Hošek in 1908.

Like the languages of the Slavic language family, Interslavic is generally written using either Latin or Cyrillic letters, or on rare occasions the Glagolitic script.

== History ==
Precursors of Interslavic have a long history and predate constructed languages like Volapük and Esperanto by centuries: the oldest description, written by the Croatian priest Juraj Križanić, goes back to the years 1659–1666.

The history of Pan-Slavic language projects is closely connected with Pan-Slavism, an ideology that endeavors cultural and political unification of all Slavs, based on the conception that all Slavic people are part of a single Slavic nation. Along with this belief came also the need for a Slavic umbrella language. Old Church Slavonic had partly served this role in previous centuries, as an administrative language in a large part of the Slavic world, and it was still used on a large scale in Orthodox liturgy, where it played a role similar to Latin in the West. A strong candidate for a more modern language is Russian, the language of the largest (and during most of the 19th century the only) Slavic-speaking majority country and also mother tongue of more than half of Slavic speakers. However, the role of the Russian language as a lingua franca in Eastern Europe and the Balkans diminished after the collapse of the Soviet Union.

In March 2006, the Slovianski project was started by a group of people from different countries, who felt the need for a simple and neutral Slavic language that the Slavs could understand without prior learning. The language they envisioned should be naturalistic and only consist of material existing in all or most Slavic languages, without any artificial additions. Initially, Slovianski was being developed in two different variants: a naturalistic version known as Slovianski-N (initiated by Jan van Steenbergen and further developed by Igor Polyakov), and a more simplified version known as Slovianski-P (initiated by Ondrej Rečnik and further developed by Gabriel Svoboda). The difference was that Slovianski-N had six grammatical cases, while Slovianski-P—like English, Bulgarian and Macedonian—used prepositions instead. Apart from these two variants (N stands for naturalism, P for pidgin or prosti "simple"), a schematic version, Slovianski-S, has been experimented with as well, but was abandoned in an early stage of the project. In 2009 it was decided that only the naturalistic version would be continued under the name Slovianski. Although Slovianski had three genders (masculine, feminine, neuter), six cases and full conjugation of verbs—features usually avoided in international auxiliary languages—a high level of simplification was achieved by means of simple, unambiguous endings and irregularity being kept to a minimum.

Slovianski was mostly used in Internet traffic and in a newsletter, Slovianska Gazeta. In February and March 2010 there was much publicity about Slovianski after articles had been dedicated to it on the Polish internet portal Interia.pl and the Serbian newspaper Večernje novosti. Shortly thereafter, articles about Slovianski appeared in the Slovak newspaper Pravda, on the news site of the Czech broadcasting station ČT24, in the Serbian blogosphere and the Serbian edition of Reader's Digest, as well as other newspapers and internet portals in the Czech Republic, Slovakia, Hungary, Serbia, Montenegro, Bulgaria and Ukraine.

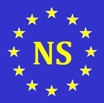
Neoslavonic logo

Slovianski has played a role in the development of other, related projects as well. Rozumio (2008) and Slovioski (2009) were both efforts to build a bridge between Slovianski and Slovio. Originally, Slovioski, developed by Polish-American Steeven Radzikowski, was merely intended to reform Slovio, but gradually it developed into a separate language. Like Slovianski, it was a collaborative project that existed in two variants: a "full" and a simplified version. In 2009 a new language was published, Neoslavonic ("Novoslovienskij", later "Novoslověnsky") by the Czech Vojtěch Merunka, based on Old Church Slavonic grammar but using part of Slovianski's vocabulary.

In 2011, Slovianski, Slovioski and Novoslověnsky merged into one common project under the name Interslavic (Medžuslovjanski). Slovianski grammar and dictionary were expanded to include all options of Neoslavonic as well, turning it into a more flexible language based on prototypes rather than fixed rules. From that time, Slovianski and Neoslavonic have no longer been developed as separate projects, even though their names are still frequently in use as synonyms or "dialects" of Interslavic.

In the same year, the various simplified forms of Slovianski and Slovioski that were meant to meet the needs of beginners and non-Slavs were reworked into a highly simplified form of Interslavic, Slovianto. Slovianto is intended to have stages of complexity: level 1 with plurals, tenses, and basic vocabulary; level 2 with grammatical gender and basic verb conjugation; and a to-be-done level 3 with noun declension.

After the 2017 Conference on Interslavic Language (CISLa), the project of unifying the two standards of Interslavic had been commenced by Merunka and van Steenbergen, with a planned new, singular grammar and orthography. An early example of this endeavor is Merunka and van Steenbergen's joint publication on Slavic cultural diplomacy, released to coincide with the conference.

After two failed applications for an ISO 639-3 code for Interslavic from 2012 and 2014, a third request was filed in September 2019 and resulted in the adoption of the ISO 639-3 code 'isv' in April 2024.

== Community ==
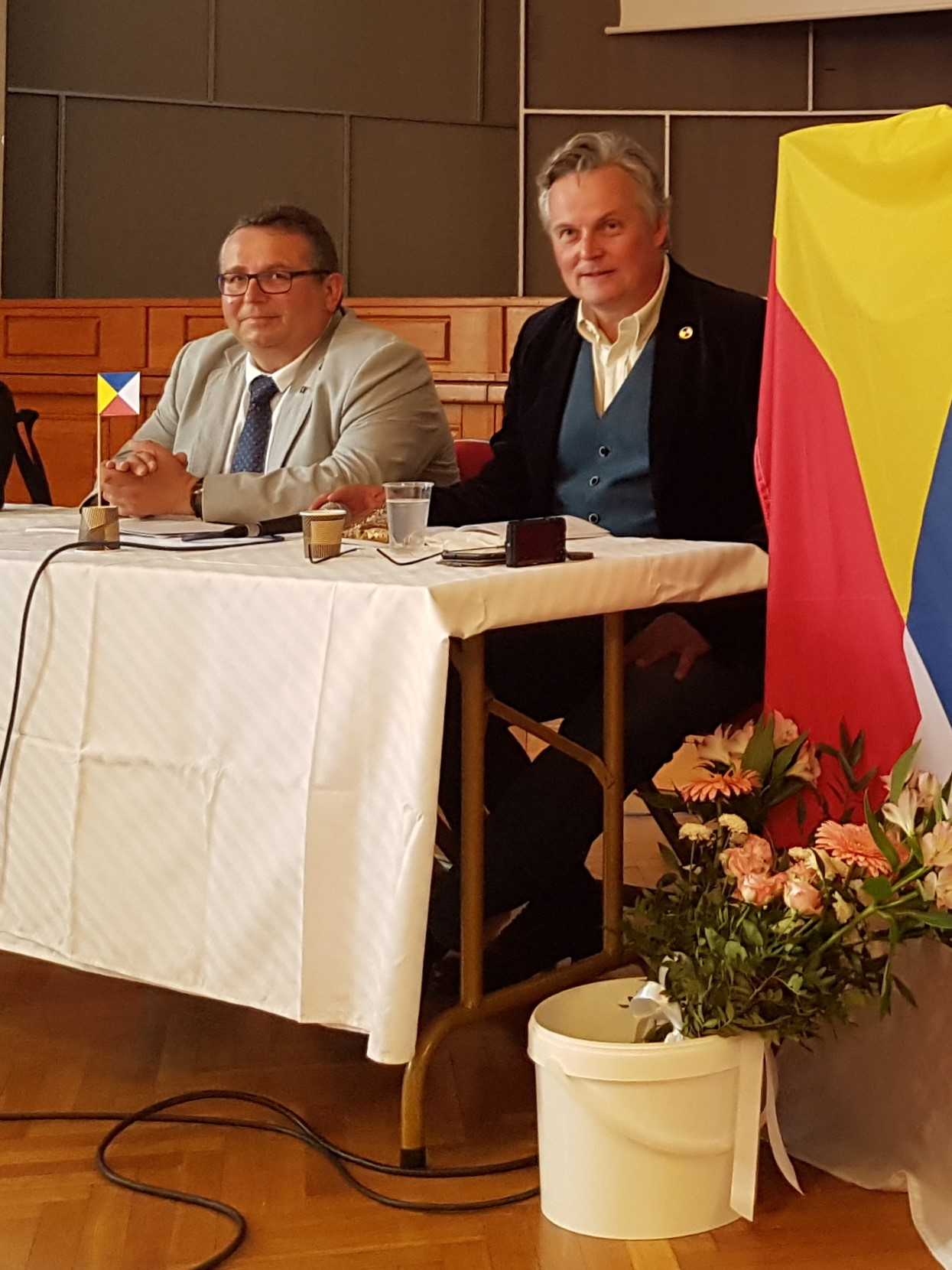
Vojtěch Merunka and Jan van Steenbergen at the Second Interslavic Conference in 2018

The number of people who speak Interslavic is difficult to establish; the lack of demographic data is a common problem among constructed languages, so that estimates are always rough. In 2012, the Bulgarian author G. Iliev mentioned a number of "several hundreds" of Slovianski speakers. For comparison, 320,000 people claimed to speak Esperanto in the same year. In 2022, the Russian magazine Mel mentioned a number of 20,000 speakers. This number clearly refers to the size of the Interslavic community as a whole and not necessarily to the number of active participants. As for the latter, Kocór e.a. (2017) estimated the number of active users of Interslavic to be 2,000.

Interslavic has an active online community, including four Facebook groups with 16,280, 835, 330 and 120 members respectively by 4 April 2022 and an Internet forum with around 490 members.

The project has two online news portals, a peer-reviewed expert journal focusing on issues of Slavic peoples in the wider sociocultural context of current times and a wiki united with a collection of texts and materials in Interslavic language somewhat similar to Wikisource. Since 2016, Interslavic is used in the scientific journal Ethnoentomology for paper titles, abstracts and image captions.

In June 2017, the first CISLa (Conference on InterSlavic Language) took place in the Czech town of Staré Město near Uherské Hradiště. The presentations were either held in Interslavic or translated into Interslavic. Two Interslavic conferences have been held since: CISLa 2018, again in Staré Město as well as in Hodonín, and CISLa 2020, held in Uherský Brod. An Interslavic Day was held in Prague on September 21, 2022.

A volunteer group consisting of native speakers of all standard Slavic languages was established by one of the members of the Interslavic Language Committee. Small Slavic languages and dialects like Rusyn or Upper Sorbian are also included. The group task is to improve the quality of the Interslavic language dictionary by intelligibility analysis.

== Phonology ==
The phonemes that were chosen for Interslavic were the most popular Slavic phonemes cross-linguistically. Since stress patterns vary greatly between Slavic languages and Interslavic is not an ethnic language, there are no hard and fast rules regarding stress.

Consonants and vowels in brackets are "optional" and link directly to Old Church Slavonic.

Consonant phonemes
		Labial	Alveolar /Dental		Post- alveolar/ Palatal	Velar
		Labial	plain	pal.	Post- alveolar/ Palatal	Velar
Nasal		m	n		nʲ~ɲ	
Stop	voiceless	p	t	(tʲ~c)		k
Stop	voiced	b	d	(dʲ~ɟ)		ɡ
Affricate	voiceless		t͡s	(t͡ɕ)	t͡ʃ~tʂ	
Affricate	voiced			(d͡ʑ)	d͡ʒ~dʐ	
Fricative	voiceless	f	s	(sʲ~ɕ)	ʃ~ʂ	x
Fricative	voiced	v	z	(zʲ~ʑ)	ʒ~ʐ	
Trill			r	(rʲ~r̝)		
Lateral			ɫ~l		l~ʎ	
Approximant					j	

Vowel phonemes
	Front	Central	Back
Close	i		u
Near-close	ɪ		(ʊ)
Mid		(ə)	
Open-mid	ɛ, jɛ		ɔ
Near-open	(jæ)		
Open	a		(ɒ)

== Alphabet ==
One of the main principles of Interslavic is that it can be written on any Slavic keyboard. Since the border between Latin and Cyrillic runs through the middle of Slavic territory, Interslavic allows the use of both alphabets. Because of the differences between, for instance, the Polish alphabet and other Slavic Latin alphabets, as well as between Serbian and other Cyrillic alphabets, orthographic variation is tolerated.

The Latin and Cyrillic alphabets are as follows:

Latin	Cyrillic	Keyboard substitutions	Pronunciation
A a	A а		a
B b	Б б		b
C c	Ц ц		ts
Č č	Ч ч	Lat. cx, cz	t͡ʃ~tʂ
D d	Д д		d
Dž dž	Дж дж	Lat. dż, dzs, dzx	d͡ʒ~dʐ
E e	Е е		ɛ
Ě ě	Є є	Lat. e, Cyr. е (or formerly ѣ)	jɛ
F f	Ф ф		f
G g	Г г		ɡ~ɦ
H h	Х х		x
I i	И и		i
J j	Ј ј	Cyr. й	j
K k	К к		k~h
L l	Л л		ɫ~l
Lj lj	Љ љ	Cyr. ль	l~ʎ
M m	М м		m
N n	Н н		n
Nj nj	Њ њ	Cyr. нь	nʲ~ɲ
O o	О о		ɔ
P p	П п		p
R r	Р р		r
S s	С с		s
Š š	Ш ш	Lat. sz, sx	ʃ~ʂ
T t	Т т		t
U u	У у		u
V v	В в		v
Y y	Ы ы	Lat. i, Cyr. и	i~ɪ~ɨ
Z z	З з		z
Ž ž	Ж ж	Lat. ż, zs, zx	ʒ~ʐ

(Pronunciation is approximate; the exact realization will depend on the accent of the speaker. For example, southern Slavs will typically substitute /i/ for y / ы)

=== Extension ===
Apart from the basic alphabet above, the Interslavic Latin alphabet has a set of optional letters as well. They differ from the standard orthography by carrying a diacritic which conveys etymological information linking directly to Proto-Slavic and Old Church Slavonic (OCS). Pronunciation may not be distinct from the regular alphabet.

Latin	Cyrillic	Keyboard substitutions	Notes	Pronunciation
Å å	Ӑ ӑ		in Proto-Slavic TorT and TolT sequences	ɒ
Ę ę	Ѧ ѧ		Matches OCS ѧ; analog to modern я	jæ
Ų ų	Ѫ ѫ		Matches OCS ѫ	ʊ~o
Ė ė	Ь ь	Lat. è	Proto-Slavic ĭ, matches OCS strong front jer, ь	ə
Ȯ ȯ	Ъ ъ	Lat. ò	Proto-Slavic ŭ, matches OCS strong back jer, ъ	ə
Ć ć	Ћ ћ		Proto-Slavic tj (OCS щ)	tɕ
Đ đ	Ђ ђ		Proto-Slavic dj (OCS жд)	dʑ
D́ d́	ДЬ дь	Lat. ď	Softened d	dʲ~ɟ
T́ t́	ТЬ ть	Lat. ť	Softened t	tʲ~c
Ĺ ĺ	ЛЬ ль	Lat. ľ	Softened l	lʲ
Ń ń	НЬ нь		Softened n	nʲ
Ŕ ŕ	РЬ рь		Softened r	rʲ~r̝
Ś ś	СЬ сь		Softened s	sʲ~ɕ
Ź ź	ЗЬ зь		Softened z	zʲ~ʑ

The consonants ď, ť, ľ, ń, ŕ, ś and ź are softened or palatalized counterparts of d, l, n, r, s, t and z. The latter are also palatalized before ě and j, and possibly before i, ę and e however it is recommended to keep a hard pronunciation.

Cyrillic equivalents of the etymological alphabet and ligatures can also be encountered in some Interslavic texts, though such spelling is not officially sanctioned.

== Morphology ==
Interslavic grammar is based on the greatest common denominator of that of the natural Slavic languages, and partly also a simplification thereof. It consists of elements that can be encountered in all or at least most of them.

=== Nouns ===
Interslavic is an inflecting language. Nouns can have three genders, two numbers (singular and plural), as well as six cases (nominative, accusative, genitive, dative, instrumental and locative). Since several Slavic languages also have a vocative, it is usually displayed in tables as well, even though strictly speaking the vocative is not a case. It occurs only in the singular of masculine and feminine nouns.

There is no article. The complicated system of noun classes in Slavic has been reduced to four or five declensions:

- masculine nouns, ending in a (usually hard) consonant: dom "house", mųž "man"
- feminine nouns ending in -a: žena "woman", zemja "earth"
- feminine nouns ending in a soft consonant: kosť "bone"
- neuter nouns ending in -o or -e: slovo "word", morje "sea"
- Old Church Slavonic also had a consonantal declension that in most Slavic languages merged into the remaining declensions. Some Interslavic projects and writers preserve this declension, which consists of nouns of all three genders, mostly neuters:
  - neuter nouns of the group -mę/-men-: imę/imene "name"
  - neuter nouns of the group -ę/-ęt- (children and young animals): telę/telęte "calf"
  - neuter nouns of the group -o/-es-: nebo/nebese "sky"
  - masculine nouns of the group -en-: kameń/kamene "stone"
  - feminine nouns with the ending -ȯv: cŕkȯv/cŕkve "church"
  - feminine nouns with the ending -i/-er-: mati/matere "mother"

Declension of nouns
	masculine				neuter		feminine			consonantal		
	hard, animate	hard, non-animate	soft, animate	soft, non-animate	hard	soft	-a, hard	-a, soft	-Ø	m.	n.	f.
singular
N.	brat "brother"	dom "house"	mųž "man"	kraj "land"	slovo "word"	morje "sea"	žena "woman"	zemja "earth"	kost́ "bone"	kamen "stone"	imę "name"	mati "mother"
A.	brata	dom	mųža	kraj	slovo	morje	ženų	zemjų	kost́	kamen	imę	mater
G.	brata	doma	mųža	kraja	slova	morja	ženy	zemje	kosti	kamene	imene	matere
D.	bratu	domu	mųžu	kraju	slovu	morju	ženě	zemji	kosti	kameni	imeni	materi
I.	bratom	domom	mųžem	krajem	slovom	morjem	ženojų	zemjejų	kost́jų	kamenem	imenem	materjų
L.	bratu	domu	mųžu	kraju	slovu	morju	ženě	zemji	kosti	kameni	imeni	materi
V.	brate	dome	mųžu	kraju	slovo	morje	ženo	zemjo	kosti	kameni	imę	mati
	plural											
N.	brati	domy	mųži	kraje	slova	morja	ženy	zemje	kosti	kameni	imena	materi
A.	bratov	domy	mųžev	kraje	slova	morja	ženy	zemje	kosti	kameni	imena	materi
G.	bratov	domov	mųžev	krajev	slov	morej	žen	zem(ej)	kostij	kamenev	imen	materij
D.	bratam	domam	mųžam	krajam	slovam	morjam	ženam	zemjam	kost́am	kamenam	imenam	materam
I.	bratami	domami	mųžami	krajami	slovami	morjami	ženami	zemjami	kost́ami	kamenami	imenami	materami
L.	bratah	domah	mųžah	krajah	slovah	morjah	ženah	zemjah	kost́ah	kamenah	imenah	materah

=== Adjectives ===
Adjectives are always regular. They agree with the noun they modify in gender, case and number, and are usually placed before it. In the column with the masculine forms, the first relates to animate nouns, the second to inanimate nouns. A distinction is made between hard and soft stems, for example: dobry "good" and svěži "fresh":

Declension of adjectives
	hard			soft		
	m.	n.	f.	m.	n.	f.
	other animate	n.	f.	other animate	n.	f.
singular
N.	dobry	dobro	dobra	svěži	svěže	svěža
A.	dobry dobrogo	dobro	dobrų	svěži svěžego	svěže	svěžų
G.	dobrogo		dobroj	svěžego		svěžej
D.	dobromu		dobroj	svěžemu		svěžej
I.	dobrym		dobrojų	svěžim		svěžejų
L.	dobrom		dobroj	svěžem		svěžej
	plural					
N.	dobre dobri	dobre		svěže svěži	svěže	
A.	dobre dobryh	dobre		svěže svěžih	svěže	
G.	dobryh			svěžih		
D.	dobrym			svěžim		
I.	dobrymi			svěžimi		
L.	dobryh			svěžih		

Some writers make no distinction between hard and soft adjectives. One can write dobrego instead of dobrogo, svěžogo instead of svěžego.

==== Comparison ====
The comparative is formed with the ending -(ěj)ši: slabši "weaker", pȯlnějši "fuller". The superlative is formed from the comparative with the prefix naj-: najslabši "weakest". Comparatives can also be formed with the adverbs bolje or vyše "more", superlatives with the adverbs najbolje or najvyše "most".

==== Adverbs ====
Hard adjectives can be turned into an adverb with the ending -o, soft adjectives with the ending -e: dobro "well", svěže "freshly". Comparatives and superlatives can be adverbialized with the ending -ěje: slaběje "weaker".

=== Pronouns ===
The personal pronouns are: ja "I", ty "you, thou", on "he", ona "she", ono "it", my "we", vy "you" (pl.), oni/one "they". When a personal pronoun of the third person is preceded by a preposition, n- is prepended onto it.

Personal pronouns
	singular					plural			reflexive
	1st person	2nd person	3rd person			1st person	2nd person	3rd person	reflexive
	1st person	2nd person	masculine	neuter	feminine	1st person	2nd person	other masculine animate	reflexive
N.	ja	ty	on	ono	ona	my	vy	one oni	—
A.	mene (mę)	tebe (tę)	jego (go)		jų	nas	vas	je jih	sebe (sę)
G.	mene	tebe	jego		jej	nas	vas	jih	sebe
D.	mně (mi)	tobě (ti)	jemu (mu)		jej	nam	vam	jim	sobě (si)
I.	mnojų	tobojų	jim		jejų	nami	vami	jimi	sobojų
L.	mně	tobě	jim		jej	nas	vas	jih	sobě

Other pronouns are inflected as adjectives:

- the possessive pronouns moj "my", tvoj "your, thy", naš "our", vaš "your" (pl.), svoj "my/your/his/her/our/their own", as well as čij "whose"
- the demonstrative pronouns toj "this, that", tutoj "this" and tamtoj "that"
- the relative pronoun ktory "which"
- the interrogative pronouns kto "who" and čto "what"
- the indefinite pronouns někto "somebody", něčto "something", nikto "nobody", ničto "nothing", ktokoli "whoever, anybody", čto-nebųď "whatever, anything", etc.

=== Numerals ===
The cardinal numbers 1–10 are: 1 – jedin/jedna/jedno, 2 – dva/dvě, 3 – tri, 4 – četyri, 5 – pęt́, 6 – šest́, 7 – sedm, 8 – osm, 9 – devęt́, 10 – desęt́.

Higher numbers are formed by adding -nadsęť for the numbers 11–19, -desęt for the tens, -sto for the hundreds. Sometimes (but not always) the latter is inflected: dvasto/tristo/pęt́sto and dvěstě/trista/pęt́sȯt are both correct.

The inflection of the cardinal numerals is shown in the following table. The numbers 5–99 are inflected either as nouns of the kosť type or as soft adjectives.

Declension of the numbers 1–5
	1			2		3	4	5
	m.	n.	f.	m./n.	f.	3	4	5
N.	jedin	jedno	jedna	dva	dvě	tri	četyri	pęt́
A.	jedin	jedno	jednų	dva	dvě	tri	četyri	pęt́
G.	jednogo		jednoj	dvoh		trěh	četyrěh	pęti
D.	jednomu		jednoj	dvoma		trěm	četyrěm	pęti
I.	jednym		jednojų	dvoma		trěma	četyrmi	pęt́jų
L.	jednom		jednoj	dvoh		trěh	četyrěh	pęti

Ordinal numbers are formed by adding the adjective ending -y to the cardinal numbers, except in the case of pŕvy "first", drugy/vtory "second", tretji "third", četvŕty "fourth", stoty/sȯtny "hundredth", tysęčny "thousandth".

Fractions are formed by adding the suffix -ina to ordinal numbers: tretjina "(one) third", četvŕtina "quarter", etc. The only exception is pol (polovina, polovica) "half".

Interslavic has other categories of numerals as well:

- collective numerals: dvoje "pair, duo, duet", troje, četvero..., etc.
- multiplicative numerals: jediny "single", dvojny "double", trojny, četverny..., etc.
- differential numerals: dvojaky "of two different kinds", trojaky, četveraky..., etc.

=== Verbs ===
==== Aspect ====
Like all Slavic languages, Interslavic verbs have grammatical aspect. A perfective verb indicates an action that has been or will be completed and therefore emphasizes the result of the action rather than its course. On the other hand, an imperfective verb focuses on the course or duration of the action, and is also used for expressing habits and repeating patterns.

Verbs without a prefix are usually imperfective. Most imperfective verbs have a perfective counterpart, which in most cases is formed by adding a prefix:

- dělati ~ sdělati "to do"
- čistiti ~ izčistiti "to clean"
- pisati ~ napisati "to write"

Because prefixes are also used to change the meaning of a verb, secondary imperfective forms based on perfective verbs with a prefix are needed as well. These verbs are formed regularly:

- -ati becomes -yvati (e.g. zapisati ~ zapisyvati "to note, to register, to record", dokazati ~ dokazyvati "to prove")
- -iti become -jati (e.g. napraviti ~ napravjati "to lead", pozvoliti ~ pozvaljati "to allow", oprostiti ~ oprašćati "to simplify")

Some aspect pairs are irregular, for example nazvati ~ nazyvati "to name, to call", prijdti ~ prihoditi "to come", podjęti ~ podimati "to undertake".

==== Stems ====
The Slavic languages are notorious for their complicated conjugation patterns. To simplify these, Interslavic has a system of two conjugations and two verbal stems. In most cases, knowing the infinitive is enough to establish both stems:

- the first stem is used for the infinitive, the past tense, the conditional mood, the past passive participle and the verbal noun. It is formed by removing the ending -ti from the infinitive: dělati "to do" > děla-, prositi "to require" > prosi-, nesti "to carry" > nes-. Verbs ending in -sti can also have their stem ending on t or d, f.ex. vesti > ved- "to lead", gnesti > gnet- "to crush".
- the second stem is used for the present tense, the imperative and the present active participle. In most cases both stems are identical, and in most of the remaining cases the second stem can be derived regularly from the first. In particular cases they have to be learned separately. In the present tense, a distinction is made between two conjugations:
  - the first conjugation includes almost all verbs that do not have the ending -iti, as well as monosyllabic verbs on -iti:
    - verbs on -ati have the stem -aj-: dělati "to do" > dělaj-
    - verbs on -ovati have the stem -uj-: kovati "to forge" > kuj-
    - verbs on -nųti have the stem -n-: tęgnųti "to pull, to draw" > tęgn-
    - monosyllabic verbs have -j-: piti "to drink" > pij-, čuti "to feel" > čuj-
    - the second stem is identical to the first stem if the latter ends in a consonant: nesti "to carry" > nes-, vesti "to lead" > ved-
  - the second conjugation includes all polysyllabic verbs on -iti and most verbs on -ěti: prositi "to require" > pros-i-, viděti "to see" > vid-i-

There are also mixed and irregular verbs, i.e. verbs with a second stem that cannot be derived regularly from the first stem, for example: pisati "to write" > piš-, spati "to sleep" > sp-i-, zvati "to call" > zov-, htěti "to want" > hoć-. In these cases both stem have to be learned separately.

==== Conjugation ====
The various moods and tenses are formed by means of the following endings:

- Present tense: -ų, -eš, -e, -emo, -ete, -ųt (first conjugation); -jų, -iš, -i, -imo, -ite, -ęt (second conjugation)
- Past tense – simple (as in Russian): m. -l, f. -la, n. -lo, pl. -li
- Past tense – complex (as in South Slavic):
  - Imperfect tense: -h, -še, -še, -hmo, -ste, -hų
  - Perfect tense: m. -l, f. -la, n. -lo, pl. -li + the present tense of byti "to be"
  - Pluperfect tense: m. -l, f. -la, n. -lo, pl. -li + the imperfect tense of byti
- Conditional: m. -l, f. -la, n. -lo, pl. -li + the conditional of byti
- Future tense: the future tense of byti + the infinitive
- Imperative: -Ø, -mo, -te after j, or -i, -imo, -ite after another consonant.

The forms with -l- in the past tense and the conditional are actually participles known as the L-participle. The remaining participles are formed as follows:

- Present active participle: -ųći (first conjugation), -ęći (second conjugation)
- Present passive participle: -omy/-emy (first conjugation), -imy (second conjugation)
- Past active participle: -vši after a vowel, or -ši after a consonant
- Past passive participle: -ny after a vowel, -eny after a consonant. Monosyllabic verbs (except for those on -ati) have -ty. Verbs on -iti have the ending -jeny.

The verbal noun is based on the past passive participle, replacing the ending -ny/-ty with -ńje/-t́je.

==== Examples ====
First conjugation (dělati "to do")

	present	imperfect	perfect	pluperfect	conditional	future	imperative
ja	dělajų	dělah	jesm dělal(a)	běh dělal(a)	byh dělal(a)	bųdų dělati	
ty	dělaješ	dělaše	jesi dělal(a)	běše dělal(a)	bys dělal(a)	bųdeš dělati	dělaj
on ona ono	dělaje	dělaše	jest dělal jest dělala jest dělalo	běše dělal běše dělala běše dělalo	by dělal by dělala by dělalo	bųde dělati	
my	dělajemo	dělahmo	jesmo dělali	běhmo dělali	byhmo dělali	bųdemo dělati	dělajmo
vy	dělajete	dělaste	jeste dělali	běste dělali	byste dělali	bųdete dělati	dělajte
oni one	dělajųt	dělahų	sųt dělali	běhų dělali	by dělali	bųdųt dělati	

infinitive	dělati
present active participle	dělajųć-i (-a, -e)
present passive participle	dělajem-y (-a, -o)
past active participle	dělavš-i (-a, -e)
past passive participle	dělan-y (-a, -o)
verbal noun	dělańje

Second conjugation (hvaliti "to praise")

	present	imperfect	perfect	pluperfect	conditional	future	imperative
ja	hvaljų	hvalih	jesm hvalil(a)	běh hvalil(a)	byh hvalil(a)	bųdų hvaliti	
ty	hvališ	hvališe	jesi hvalil(a)	běše hvalil(a)	bys hvalil(a)	bųdeš hvaliti	hvali
on ona ono	hvali	hvališe	jest hvalil jest hvalila jest hvalilo	běše hvalil běše hvalila běše hvalilo	by hvalil by hvalila by hvalilo	bųde hvaliti	
my	hvalimo	hvalihmo	jesmo hvalili	běhmo hvalili	byhmo hvalili	bųdemo hvaliti	hvalimo
vy	hvalite	hvaliste	jeste hvalili	běste hvalili	byste hvalili	bųdete hvaliti	hvalite
oni one	hvalęt	hvalihų	sųt hvalili	běhų hvalili	by hvalili	bųdųt hvaliti	

infinitive	hvaliti
present active participle	hvalęć-i (-a, -e)
present passive participle	hvalim-y (-a, -o)
past active participle	hvalivš-i (-a, -e)
past passive participle	hvaljen-y (-a, -o)
verbal noun	hvaljeńje

Whenever the stem of verbs of the second conjugation ends in s, z, t, d, st or zd, an ending starting -j causes the following mutations:

- prositi "to require": pros-jų > prošų, pros-jeny > prošeny
- voziti "to transport": voz-jų > vožų, voz-jeny > voženy
- tratiti "to lose": trat-jų > traćų, trat-jeny > traćeny
- slěditi "to follow": slěd-jų > slěđų, slěd-jeny > slěđeny
- čistiti "to clean": čist-jų > čišćų, čist-jeny > čišćeny
- jezditi "to go (by transport)": jezd-jų > ježđų, jezd-jeny > ježđeny

==== Alternative forms ====
Because Interslavic is not a highly formalized language, a lot of variation occurs between various forms. Often used are the following alternative forms:

- In the first conjugation, -aje- is often reduced to -a-: ty dělaš, on děla etc.
- Instead of the 1st person singular ending -(j)ų, the ending -(e)m is sometimes used as well: ja dělam, ja hvalim, ja nesem.
- Instead of -mo in the 1st person plural, -me can be used as well: my děla(je)me, my hvalime.
- Instead of -hmo in the imperfect tense, -smo and the more archaic -hom can be used as well.
- Instead of the conjugated forms of byti in the conditional (byh, bys etc.), by is often used as a particle: ja by pisal(a), ty by pisal(a) etc.
- Verbal nouns can have the ending -ije instead of -je: dělanije, hvaljenije.

==== Irregular verbs ====
A few verbs have an irregular conjugation:

- byti "to be" has jesm, jesi, jest, jesmo, jeste, sųt in the present tense, běh, běše... in the imperfect tense, and bųdų, bųdeš... in the future
- dati "to give", jěsti "to eat" and věděti "to know" have the following present tense: dam, daš, da, damo, date, dadųt; jem, ješ...; věm, věš...
- idti "to go by foot, to walk" has an irregular L-participle: šel, šla, šlo, šli.

== Vocabulary ==
Words in Interslavic are based on comparison of the vocabulary of the modern Slavic languages. For this purpose, the latter are subdivided into six groups:

- Russian
- Ukrainian and Belarusian
- Polish
- Czech and Slovak
- Slovene and Serbo-Croatian
- Bulgarian and Macedonian

These groups are treated equally. In some situations even smaller languages, like Kashubian, Rusyn and Sorbian languages are included. Interslavic vocabulary has been compiled in such way that words are understandable to a maximum number of Slavic speakers. The form in which a chosen word is adopted depends not only on its frequency in the modern Slavic languages, but also on the inner logic of Interslavic, as well as its form in Proto-Slavic: to ensure coherence, a system of regular derivation is applied.

Sample words in Interslavic, compared to other Slavic languages. Non-cognates bolded.
English	Interslavic	Russian	Ukrainian and Belarusian		Polish	Czech and Slovak		Slovene and Serbo-Croatian		Macedonian and Bulgarian		Unclassified
English	Interslavic	Russian	Ukrainian	Belarusian	Polish	Czech	Slovak	Slovene	Serbo-Croatian	Macedonian	Bulgarian	Upper Sorbian
human being	člověk / чловєк	человек	чоловік (only "male human"; "human being" is "людина")	чалавек / čalaviek	człowiek	člověk	človek	človek	čovjek, čovek / човјек, човек	човек	човек	čłowjek
dog	pes / пес	пёс, **собака**	пес, **собака**	**сабака / sabaka**	pies	pes	pes	pes	pas, **kuče** / пас, **куче**	пес, **куче**	пес, **куче**	pos, psyk
wolf	volk / волк	волк	вовк	воўк / voŭk	wilk	vlk	vlk	volk	vuk / вук	волк	вълк	wjelk
house	dom / дом	дом	дім, **будинок**	дом, **будынак** / dom, **budynak**	dom	dům	dom	dom, **hiša**	dom, **kuća** / дом, **кућа**	дом, **куќа**	дом, **къща**	dom
book	kniga / книга	книга	книжка, книга	кніга / kniha	książka, księga	kniha	kniha	knjiga	knjiga / књига	книга	книга	kniha
night	noč / ноч	ночь	ніч	ноч / noč	noc	noc	noc	noč	noć / ноћ	ноќ	нощ	nóc
letter (message)	pismo / писмо	письмо	**лист**	пісьмо, **ліст** / piśmo, **list**	**list**, pismo	dopis	**list**	pismo	pismo / писмо	писмо	писмо	**list**
big, large, great	veliky / великы	**большой**, великий	великий	вялікі / vialiki	wielki	velký	veľký	velik	velik, **golem** / велик, **голем**	**голем**	**голям**	wulki
new	novy / новы	новый	новий	новы / novy	nowy	nový	nový	nov	nov / нов	нов	нов	nowy
old	stary / стары	старый	старий	стары / stary	stary	starý	starý	star	star / стар	стар	стар	stary
language	jezyk / језык	язык	**мова**	**мова / mova**	język, **mowa**	jazyk	jazyk	jezik	jezik / језик	јазик	език	jazyk

== Example ==
The Sheep and the Horses

(1) A sheep that had no wool saw horses, one of them pulling a heavy wagon, one carrying a big load, and one carrying a man quickly.

(2) The sheep said to the horses: "My heart pains me, seeing a man driving horses."

(3) The horses said: "Listen, sheep, our hearts pain us when we see this: a man, the master, makes the wool of the sheep into a warm garment for himself. And the sheep has no wool."

(4) Having heard this, the sheep fled into the plain.

Ovca i konji (Latin)

Na vozvyšenosti ovca, ktora ne iměla volnu, uviděla konjev. Prvy tegal težky voz, vtory nosil veliko brěme, tretji brzo vozil muža. Ovca rěkla konjam: «Boli mně srdce, kogda vidžu, kako člověk vladaje konjami.» Konji rěkli: «Slušaj, ovco, nam boli srdce, kogda vidimo ovo: muž, gospodar, bere tvoju volnu, da by iměl dlja sebe teplo paljto. A ovca jest bez volny.» Uslyšavši to, ovca izběgla v ravninu.

Овца и коњи (Cyrillic)

На возвышености овца, ктора не имєла волну, увидєла коњев. Првы тегал тежкы воз, вторы носил велико брєме, третји брзо возил мужа. Овца рєкла коњам: «Боли мнє срдце, когда виджу, како чловєк владаје коњами.» Коњи рєкли: «Слушај, овцо, нам боли срдце, когда видимо ово: муж, господар, бере твоју волну, да бы имєл дља себе тепло паљто. А овца јест без волны.» Услышавши то, овца избєгла в равнину.

Ovca i konji (Latin, etymological)

Na vȯzvyšenosti ovca, ktora ne iměla vȯlnų, uviděla konjev. Pŕvy tęgal tęžky voz, vtory nosil veliko brěmę, tret́ji brzo vozil mųža. Ovca rěkla konjam: «Boli mně sŕdce, kȯgda viđų, kako člověk vladaje konjami.» Konji rěkli: «Slušaj, ovco, nam boli sŕdce, kȯgda vidimo ovo: mųž, gospodaŕ, bere tvojų vȯlnų, da by iměl dlja sebe teplo paljto. A ovca jest bez vȯlny.» Uslyšavši to, ovca izběgla v råvninų.

== Practical use ==
Various experiments with Interslavic practical use are being made: namely, short songs and film translations. In 2022, an Interslavic version of the song Jožin z bažin appeared. In the same year, a social app in early development was translated into Interslavic. The translation served as a "prosthesis" for the lack of translations into Slavic languages.

Interslavic is featured in Václav Marhoul's 2019 film The Painted Bird (based on the novel of the same title by Polish-American writer Jerzy Kosiński), in which it plays the role of an unspecified Slavic language, making it the first movie to use the language. Marhoul stated that he decided to use Interslavic (after searching on Google for "Slavic Esperanto") so that no Slavic nation would nationally identify with the villagers depicted as bad people in the movie. The film also contains a song in Interslavic, titled "Dušo moja".

Several musicians and bands have recorded music in Interslavic, including the album Počva by the Czech pagan folk group Ďyvina, the song "Idemo v Karpaty" by the Ukrainian reggae band the Vyo, the song "Masovo pogrebanje" by the Croatian folk band Mito Matija, and several albums recorded by the Polish YouTuber Melac.

Books in Interslavic include:

- Čitateljnik, an anthology of short Interslavic texts by sixteen different authors (2018)
- Maly princ, a translation of Antoine de Saint-Exupéry's work The Little Prince by Jan van Steenbergen (2021)
- Nehaj Nesut Nas Běle Oblaky (Нехај Несут Нас Бєле Облакы, "Let White Clouds Carry Us"), the first full-length original novel written entirely in modern Interslavic, a youth fantasy adventure by Aleksij Bernat (Aleksy Bernat; 2025)

== Literature ==
- Barandovská-Frank, Věra. Panslawische Variationen. Brosch, Ciril i Fiedler, Sabine (ed.), Florilegium Interlinguisticum. Festschrift für Detlev Blanke zum 70. Geburtstag. Peter Lang Internationaler Verlag der Wissenschaften, Frankfurt am Main, 2011, ISBN 978-3-631-61328-3, pp. 209–236.
- Duličenko, Aleksandr D. Pravigo de la slava interlingvistiko: slava reciprokeco kaj tutslava lingvo en la historio de Slavoj. Grundlagenstudien aus Kybernetik und Geisteswissenschaft, no. 57:2, June 2016, Akademia Libroservo, ISSN 0723-4899, pp. 75–101.
- Kocór, Maria, et al. Zonal Constructed Language and Education Support of e-Democracy – The Interslavic Experience. Sokratis K. Katsikas & Vasilios Zorkadis eds., E-Democracy – Privacy-Preserving, Secure, Intelligent E-Government Services. 7th International Conference, E-Democracy 2017, Athens, Greece, December 14–15, 2017, Proceedings (Communications in Computer and Information Science no. 792, Springer International Publishing, 2017, ISBN 978-3-319-71116-4, 978-3-319-71117-1), pp. 15–30.
- Kuznetsov, Nikolai. The Interslavic Language: Way of Communication Among the Slavic Nations and Ethnic Groups. Journal of Ethnophilosophical Questions and Global Ethics 2.1 (2018): pp. 18–28.
- Meyer, Anna-Maria. Slavic constructed languages in the internet age. Language Problems & Language Planning, vol. 40 no. 3 (January 2016), pp. 287–315.
- Meyer, Anna-Maria. Wiederbelebung einer Utopie. Probleme und Perspektiven slavischer Plansprachen im Zeitalter des Internets. Bamberger Beiträge zur Linguistik 6, Bamberg: Univ. of Bamberg Press, 2014, ISBN 978-3-86309-233-7.
- Merunka, Vojtěch, Interslavic zonal constructed language: an introduction for English-speakers (Lukáš Lhoťan, 2018, ISBN 9788090700499).
- Merunka, Vojtěch. Neoslavonic zonal constructed language. České Budějovice, 2012, ISBN 978-80-7453-291-7.
- Merunka, Vojtěch; Heršak, Emil; Molhanec, Martin. Neoslavonic Language. Grundlagenstudien aus Kybernetik und Geisteswissenschaft, no. 57:2, June 2016, Akademia Libroservo, ISSN 0723-4899, pp. 114–134.
- Рупосова, Л.П., История межславянского языка. Вестник Московского государственного областного университета. Московский государственный областной университет, 2012 no. 1 (ISSN 2224-0209), pp. 51–56.
- Steenbergen, Jan van. Constructed Slavic languages in the 21st century. Grundlagenstudien aus Kybernetik und Geisteswissenschaft, no. 57:2, June 2016, Akademia Libroservo, ISSN 0723-4899, pp. 102–113.
- Steenbergen, Jan van. Język międzysłowiański jako lingua franca dla Europy Środkowej . Ilona Koutny, Ida Stria (eds.): Język / Komunikacja / Informacja nr XIII (2018). Poznań: Wydawnictwo Rys, 2018. ISBN 978-83-65483-72-0, ISSN 1896-9585, pp. 47–61.
