= Jan van Steenbergen =

Dutch journalist, translator, and language constructor (born 1970)

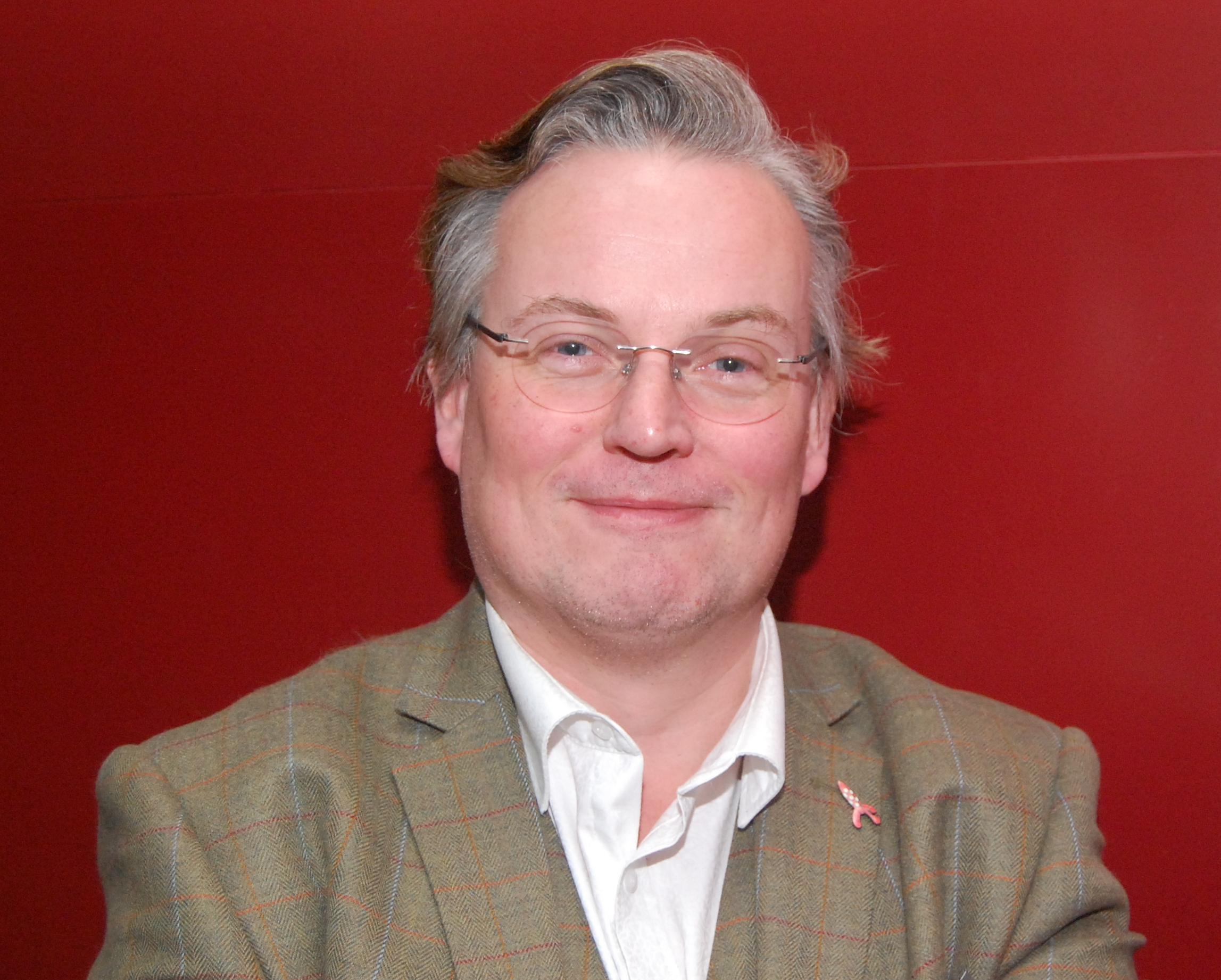
- Van Steenbergen in 2017
- Born: June 3, 1970 (age 56); Hoorn, Netherlands
- Occupations: Translator, interpreter
- Known for: Creator of Wenedyk and Interslavic

Johannes Hendrik "Jan" van Steenbergen (Dutch pronunciation: [joːˈɦɑnəs ˈɦɛndrɪk ˈjɑɱ vɑn ˈsteːmbɛrɣə(n)]; born June 3, 1970) is a Dutch translator and interpreter. He is known for being the author of several constructed languages, notably Interslavic and Wenedyk.

He was born in Hoorn, where he spent most of his childhood. In 1988 he became a student at the Amsterdam University, where he graduated in East European Studies with major topics in Slavistics and musicology. He continued his studies in Poland at Warsaw University and worked at the Warsaw Autumn festival for contemporary music. In 1997, he became a Polish translator and interpreter in the Netherlands.

In 1996, he started work on an artificial North Slavic language, Vuozgašchai (Vozgian), and in 2002 he created another language, Wenedyk, designed to show what Polish might have looked like if it had been a Romance rather than Slavic language. In 2006, he was one of the initiators of the Pan-Slavic language Slovianski (later renamed Interslavic), as well as the coordinator of a project for the creation of an electronic Interslavic dictionary. In November 2013, he was awarded the Josef Dobrovský medal for his 'contributions to Slavic culture and science'. In 2018 he also received the medal "The Living Word" of the Khovansky Foundation.

Van Steenbergen lives in IJmuiden. He is married and has three children.
