= Wede =

Constructed language by Adalbert Baumann

- Weltdeutsch, Weltpitshn, Oiropa'pitshn
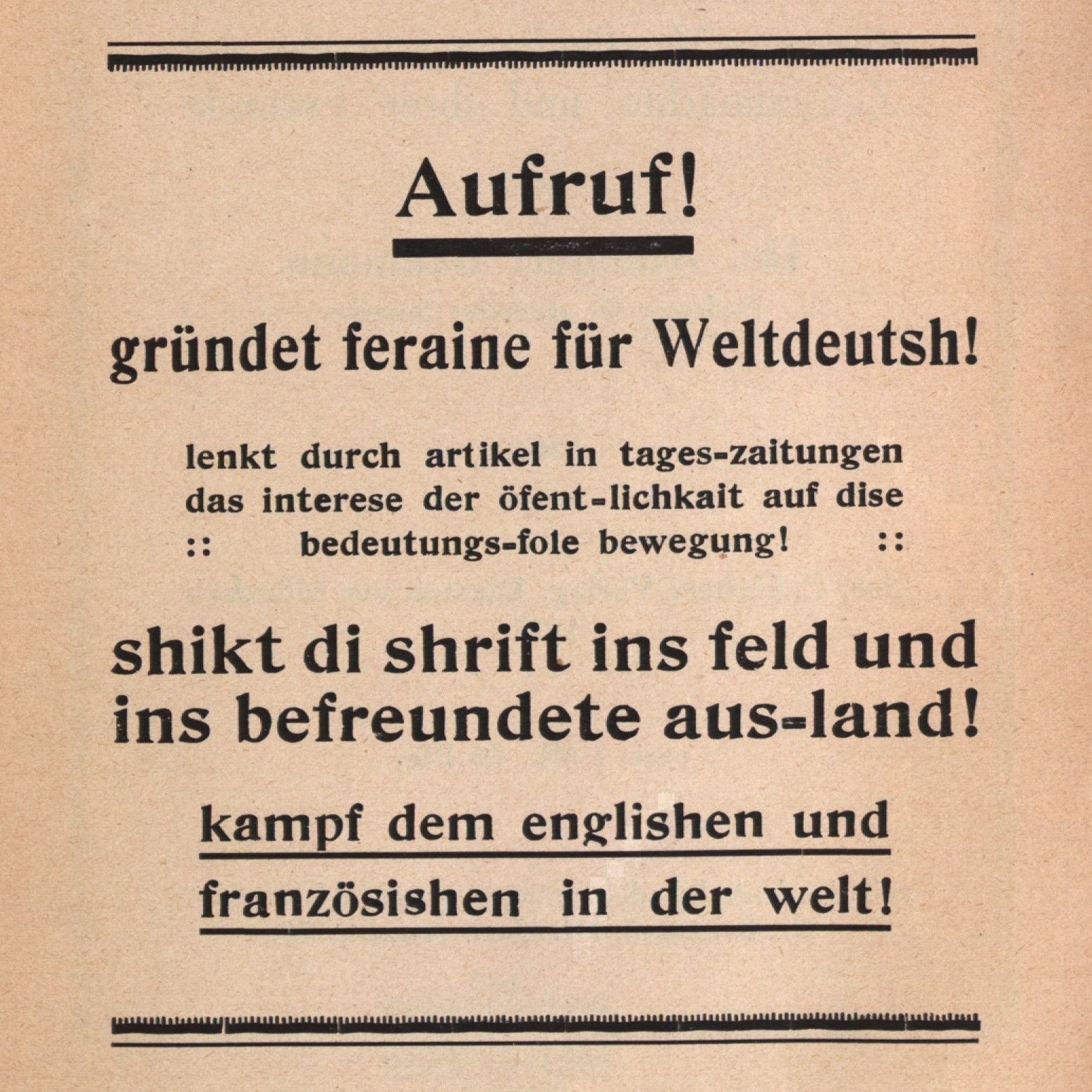
- An extract from Baumann's Weltdeutsch, in Weltdeutsch
- Pronunciation: [ˈveːdə], [ˈvɛltdɔʏtʃ], [ˈvɛltpɪtʃn̩]
- Created by: Adalbert Baumann
- Date: 1915–28
- Purpose: Constructed language: Simplified language; Wede
- Writing system: Latin
- Sources: German, Yiddish

Language codes
- ISO 639-3: None (mis)

Wede (IPA: [ˈveːdə]), Weltdeutsch (IPA: [ˈvɛltdɔʏtʃ]), Weltpitshn (IPA: [ˈvɛltpɪtʃn̩]), and Oiropa'pitshn were a series of languages created by Bavarian politician and teacher Adalbert Baumann to create a zonal auxiliary language based on the German language. The first of the languages, Wede (short for Welt-dialekt, World dialect), was published in 1915, with Weltdeutsch, Weltpitshn, and Oiropa'pitshn being published in 1916, 1925, and 1928 respectively. The languages were a posteriori, largely based on the German language – they primarily differed in grammatical and orthographic simplifications. Baumann's languages received a largely negative reception, being mocked by members of the Esperanto and Ido communities; none were implemented in any official manner.

The primary purpose of these languages was to provide a simplified version of German to be easily learnt by foreigners, particularly in the Baltic states and the German colonial empire. Baumann saw previous international auxiliary languages as unsuitable for international communication, in particular criticising their orthographies and source languages. The languages were published via two books and several articles in newspapers.

== Creator ==
Adalbert Baumann was a German gymnasium teacher, politician, and historian. A supporter of Bavarian separatism, he founded the Democratic Socialist Citizen's Party of Munich (German: Demokratisch-sozialistische Bürgerpartei München) in mid-November 1918. Baumann promoted the creation of a union state between Austria and Bavaria, on the basis that a peace treaty for a victorious Germany after the First World War would better benefit Bavaria in such a country. Baumann was a member of the Munich branch of the USPD, but quit in mid-1920.

Joining the Nazi Party, Baumann was a proponent for the formation of a German language office; in 1933, he sent a letter to Joseph Goebbels with a plea to establish one, which was denied, and he would later be expelled from the Party in 1937. Contrasting with his German nationalism, Baumann also supported the formation of a European Economic Union of 26 countries; in March 1935, Baumann wrote a letter addressed to the governments of Europe demanding an artificial lingua franca be installed to aid "the economically consolidated Europe". In Baumann's view, the language should be German:

Als solche Hilfssprache kann keine von allen Völkern erst neu zu erlernende Kunstsprache wie das sprachlich und praktisch unsinnige Esperanto in Frage kommen, sondern nur eine vereinfachte, weitestgehende Ableitung von der in Europa verbreitetsten Sprache, das ist die deutsche!

English translation: An artificial language such as the linguistically and practically nonsensical Esperanto, which is to be relearned by all peoples, cannot be taken into consideration as such an auxiliary language; only a simplified, extensive derivation of the most widely spoken language in Europe [can], that being German!

== History ==
=== Wede ===
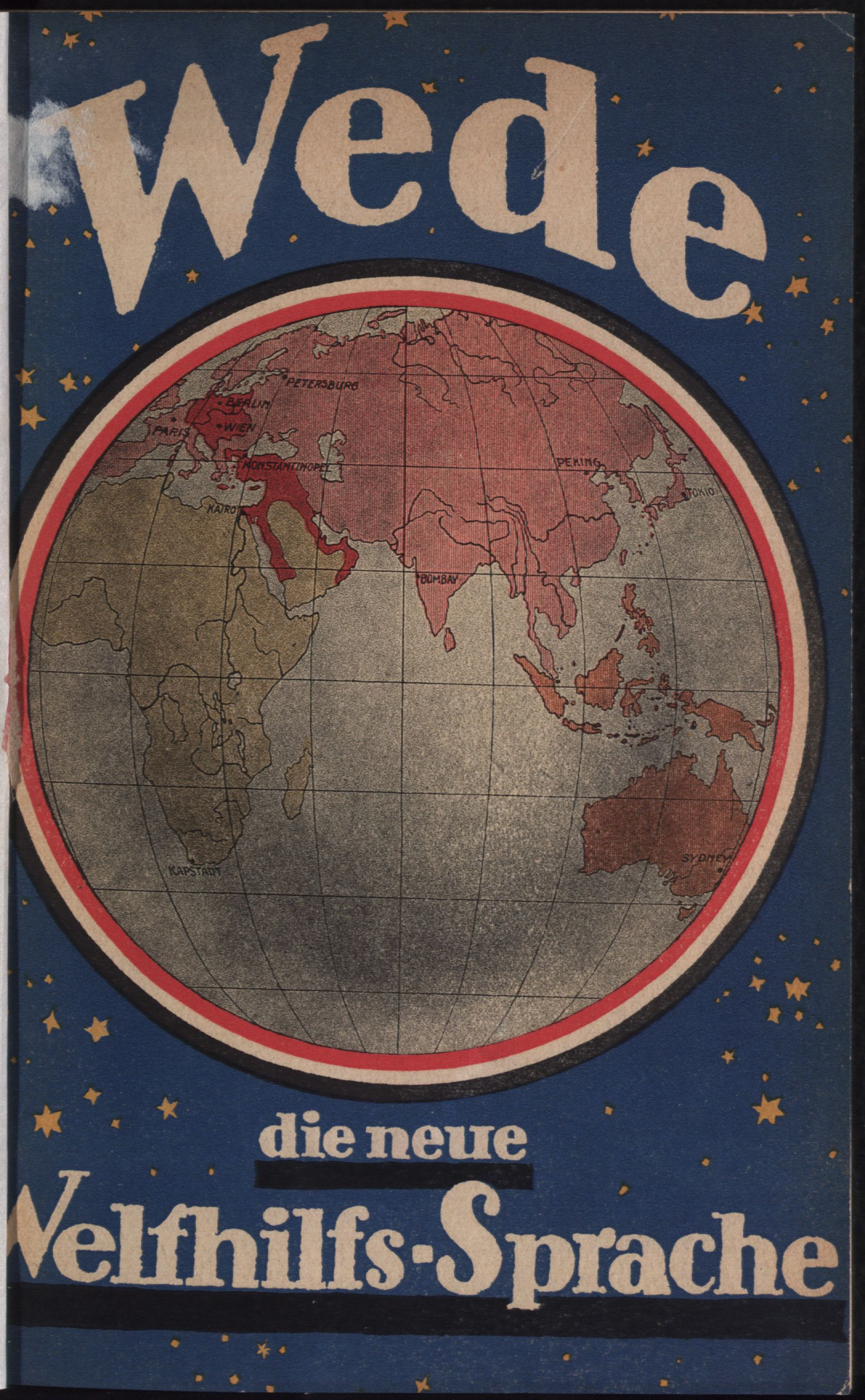
The front cover of the publication of Wede

In September 1915, Baumann published Wede: the language of understanding for the Central Powers and their Friends, the new World Language (Wede: die Verständigungssprache der Zentralmächte und ihrer Freunde, die neue Welthilfssprache), wherein he outlined his thoughts regarding international auxiliary languages and presented Wede. The name is an abbreviation for "Weltdialekt" (World Dialect), which Baumann shortened in "the American way".

Baumann believed that the Romance languages (among which he counted English, due to the influence of French on English) had been the dominant world languages throughout the Middle Ages up to the time of writing, partly perpetuated through the use of Latin in the Christian Church and also through the suppression of Germany by France in events such as the Thirty Years' War. Baumann also saw the use of Spanish in the Americas as an example of how Roman influence (as he termed it, Romanismus) still continued to impact the world and Germany.

Baumann was a critic of previous international languages; Volapük for its excess verb forms (especially its use of an Aorist aspect), excessive minimal pairs, and excessive use of umlauts. Baumann especially took issue with Esperanto, criticising the circumflexes used in its orthography, supposed monotony, instability, and dearth of speakers. Baumann found the correlative system of the language unacceptable, due to the similarity of the individual correlatives making distinguishing between them in fast speech difficult. In Baumann's view, a significant reason for the failure of previous language projects was that they were based on the Romance languages, and especially on the dead language of Latin.

Wede was a language created for chauvinistic, nationalist, and imperialist purposes:

... daß Deutschland nach dem unbefangenen Urteile aller Völker das meiste moralische Recht hat, der Welt eine aus seinem Schoße geborene Hilfssprache zu geben, eine Weltsprache ins Germanischem, nicht in romanischem Geiste. English translation: ... that Germany, according to the unbiased judgement of all peoples, has the most moral right to give the world an auxiliary language born from its womb, a world language in the Germanic, not in the Romanic spirit.

In this, Baumann was not the first – according to German interlinguist Detlev Blanke, Elias Molee's Tutonish was also created for chauvinistic purposes; Sven Werkmeister argues that Wede was a form of linguistic purism, as part of its function was to prevent uncontrolled language change and influence from foreign languages. The language received a negative reception, with Soviet Esperantist Ernest Drezen describing it as "incomprehensible" and remarking that "for the Germans it is nothing but a caricature reminiscent of their own mother tongue" in his Historio de la Mondolingvo (History of the international language).

=== Weltdeutsch ===
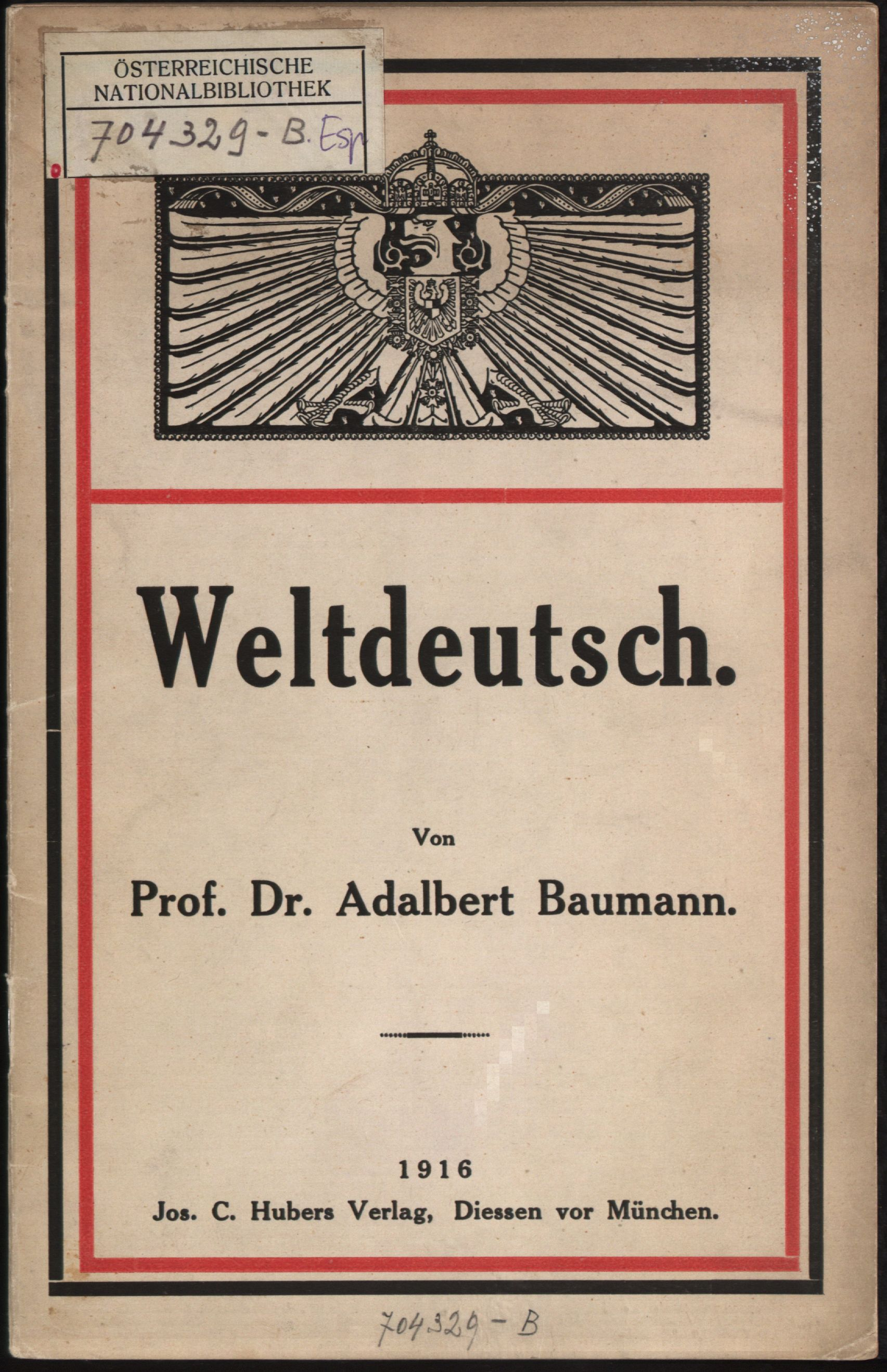
Front cover of Weltdeutsch

On 16 December 1916, Baumann released a sequel to Wede, entitled Das neue, leichte Weltdeutsch (das verbesserte Wedé) für unsere Bundesgenossen und Freunde! (The new, easy Weltdeutsch (the improved Wedé (Note: Wede is here spelt Wedé due to the new orthography of Weltdeutsch.)) for our allies and friends!). The book, like its predecessor was published by Joseph Carl Huber in Munich. (Note: Baumann 1916, p. cover)

Baumann created Weltdeutsch as a response to reactions to Wede's orthography, which he intended to simplify in the new language. According to Baumann, the new language was particularly influenced by the comments from a W. Schreiber, Fritz Buckel, and privy councillor Emil Schwörer, who would publish his own German-based auxiliary language, Kolonial-Deutsch, in the same year.

Baumann argued that his language was necessary due to the incoming "world economic war" between Germany and England, claiming that this war could only be won through a political and economic alliance between Germany and the Central and Eastern European powers. As such an alliance was hindered by the multilingualism of Europe, Baumann designed Wede to be a foreigner-friendly form of the German language. Baumann viewed the international use of French and of English as a factor for the struggle of the Central Powers in the First World War, citing the use of French in Turkey as the reason for Turkey's supposedly positive relations with France during the war. Additionally, Baumann saw the increasing world population as a threat to the German language, reporting that German had fallen to fourth place among the most spoken languages, behind Chinese.

In Baumann's view, one of the largest reasons for this decline was German's difficulty of acquisition: judging by this criterion, he viewed English as surpassing German.

=== Welt'pitshn and Oiropa'pitshn ===
In 1925, Baumann released another language, Welt'pitshn (lit. 'World pidgin'). Like its predecessors, it received a negative reception, being described in the Esperanto newspaper Sennaciulo as a "result of partisan critics on the territory of international language" ("rezultaĵo de partiecaj kritikemuloj sur la teritorio mondlingva"). An article in the February 1926 edition of the Universal Esperanto Association's magazine Esperanto reported that although Baumann had published articles in the press he had no supporters for Welt'pitshn, and called the language a "mutilated German".

Three years later in 1928, Baumann published a fourth language – Oiropa'pitshn (lit. 'European pidgin', abbreviated to "Opi"). Baumann published and promoted it in several newspapers, including the Allgemeine Rundschau of Munich. Although he intended to publish another book on the language, as he had for both Wede and Weltdeutsch, he was unable to find a publisher willing to release the work, despite attempting correspondence with sixty publishing houses. Like its predecessors, it was mocked by both Esperantists and Occidentalists, with Johano Koppmann responding in Katolika Mondo:

Ni demandas, kun kia jaro oni volas postuli, ke ĉiuj devas lerni germanajn vortojn, kial ĉiuj ceteraj lingvoj devas esti eligataj el la kunlaboro de l’konstruado de helplingvo? ... Ĉion kuntirante ni opinias senutila, ke unu viro dum 16 jaroj laboregas je problemo jam delonge solvita, depost 50 jaroj.

English translation: We ask, in what year do they want to demand that everyone must learn German words, why must all other languages be excluded from the cooperation of the construction of an auxiliary language? ... Taking everything together, we think it is useless for one man to work for 16 years on a problem that has long been solved, these past 50 years.

— Johann Koppman, 15 June 1928 in Katolika Mundo.

== Grammar ==
Baumann's languages had large grammatical simplifications, with several features of German grammar being removed. Among these was grammatical gender, with Wede now only conjugating articles for grammatical number. This removal also extended to gendered third-person pronouns; German's masculine, feminine and neuter er, sie, and es were all replaced with de. Baumann quantified his grammatical simplifications into a set of rules, of which there were 38 for Weltdeutsch and Welt'pitshn, and 25 for Oiropa'pitshn.

Adjective inflection was also removed, with only the ending ⟨-e⟩ remaining for all adjectives in Weltdeutsch, as in Wede. Wede also supported using present participles as adjectives, as well as nominalized adjectives, which were marked with the suffix -s. Wede's degrees of comparison were marked with the suffixes -ere for the comparative and -ste for the superlative, although the latter became -este after singular articles. Baumann also removed many of German's prepositions in Weltdeutsch, leaving 27 from German's 54.

Oiropa'pitshn's grammar was largely based on that of English, as Baumann considered it the simplest of modern languages – Julian Prorók, writing in Cosmoglotta, described it as "reforming German in an English fashion" ("reforma german in maniere angles").

=== Articles ===
Wede's definite article was t (plural ti), and the indefinite article eine (no plural indefinite article existed). Omission of an article was grammatical in several cases, for example after prepositions relating to time and place and in idioms. Articles were also to be omitted after mergers of articles and prepositions (as in übers, "above the", from über and das). In Weltdeutsch, Welt'pitshn, and Oiropa'pitshn, the articles were de in the singular and di in the plural. In Weltdeutsch, aine was used as an indefinite article; although English articles were also grammatical, with an being used in front of vowels and a in all other cases (a hund, an apfel).

=== Verbs ===
Wede had two tenses (the present and past, specifically the preterite), and two auxiliary verbs, hawen and werden. Baumann decided to have a total of four verb forms, from these two tenses in conjunction with the active and passive voices – hawen was used for the active and werden for the passive. Other forms of the two auxiliary verbs were used to create other moods and voices, such as the conditional, which was formed with wirden (German: würden, would). In Wede, all verbs ended in -en, but this ending could often be dropped. However, there were several exceptions to this rule, such as when the endings were needed for clarity; this was seen for instance in the verbs hawen and gewen.

Wede verb conjugations
| Tense | Form | Wede | English | Notes |
|---|---|---|---|---|
| Infinitive | -en | slagen | to strike | |
| Present Participle | -end | slagend | striking | |
| Past Participle | ge- + stem + -(et) | geslag(et) | struck (or strucken) | Parenthesised endings indicate that their use is optional. |
Active forms
| Present | -en | slag(en) | I strike | Vide supra. |
| Preterite | hawen + -et | ik hawen geslag(et) | I have struck | |
| Future | – | ik slag(en) morgen | Tomorrow I will strike | Baumann elected not to create a new conjugation, so future phrases were constructed using specific time phrases. |
| Imperative | Singular: -e Plural: -en | slage! slagen! | Strike! | |
| Conditional | Present: wirde + infinitive Past: wirde hawen + past participle | ik wirde slag(en) ik wirde hawen geslag(et) | I would strike I would have struck | |
| Optative | meg(en) or welen wir | er meg(en) slag(en) or welen wir slag(en) | May he strike! or May we strike! | |
Passive forms
| Present | werden + past participle | ik werden geslaget | I am (being) struck | |
| Preterite | worden + past participle | ik worden geslaget | I have been struck | |
| Conditional | wirde + past participle | ik wirde geslaget | I would be struck | |
| Future | – | ik werden geslaget morgen | Tomorrow I'll be struck | Vide supra. |

In Weltdeutsch, Baumann added a third conjugation, the conditional, and further simplified verbs by eliminating forms such as the passive and subjunctive, and further reducing irregular verbs. Weltdeutsch's past tense used no auxiliary verb, and had a conjugation following German's imperfect construct. Weltdeutsch's present tense was formed using the language's only auxiliary verb tun conjugated for person, followed by the infinitive form of the verb, although the auxiliary verb was to be omitted in colloquial speech. In Weltdeutsch, tmesis of separable verbs was also eliminated: such verbs would be hyphenated instead.

Weltdeutsch conjugations of tun
| Person | Present | Past | Conditional | English |
|---|---|---|---|---|
| First | tu | tat | tät | I do, I did, I would |
| Second | tust | tat-st | tät-st | You do, you did, you would |
| Third | tut | tat | tät | He does, he did, he would |

Weltdeutsch conjugations
| Tense | Form | Weltdeutsch | English |
|---|---|---|---|
| Present | conjugated verb tun + infinitive | ich tu komen | I come |
| Past | conjugated verb tun + infinitive | ich tat komen | I came |

=== Nouns ===
Overview of cases (with the noun for "father")
| Case | Preposition | Wede | | Weltdeutsch | |
| Case | Preposition | Singular | Plural | Singular | Plural |
|---|---|---|---|---|---|
| Nominative | - | t fater | ti fatera | de fater | di fätern |
| Accusative | - | t fater | ti fatera | de fater | di fätern |
| Dative | to | t fater | ti fatera | de fater | di fätern |
| Genitive | fon | t fater | ti fatera | de fater | di fätern |

In Wede, plural nouns used the suffix -a. This replaced any other ending from German; for example, Eltern (parents) became eltera, and Weihnachten (Christmas) became weinagta.Wede's accusative case was identical to its nominative case; the dative case, using the preposition to (a loanword from English), was only used to distinguish direct and indirect objects and for directions, and the genitive, using fon, for showing origin and possession. Apart from using fon, the genitive construction could also be expressed using a hyphenated closed compound: for example, t frau fon t haus (lit. 'the woman of the house', German: die Frau des Hauses) could become t haus-frau ('the house-wife', die Hausfrau).

Weltdeutsch's plural nouns ended in -en, except in certain circumstances, such as words ending in -el, -er, or -en. Plural nouns were mostly distinguished via ablaut, usually to umlauted versions (e.g. "au" to "äu"). In both Weltdeutsch and Wede, grammatical case was handled using a system of prepositional complements.

== Orthography ==
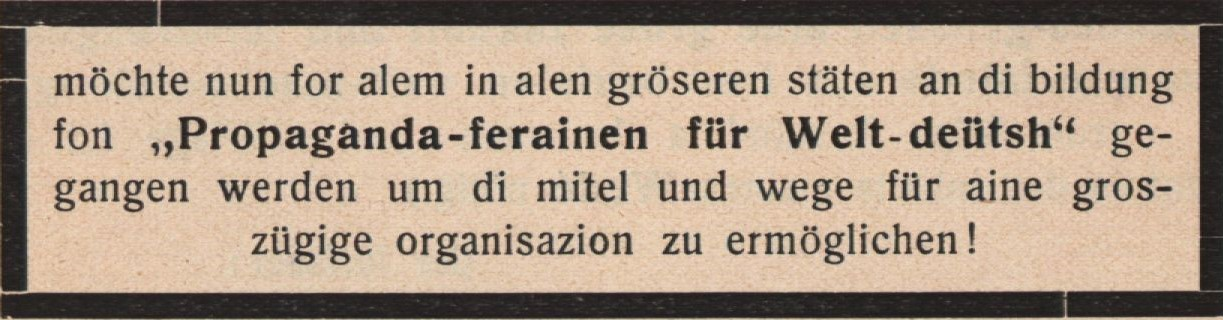
An example of the orthography of Weltdeutsch, from Baumann's 1916 book

Wede included a spelling reform, using an alphabet of 24 letters. From the German alphabet, Baumann removed the letters ⟨v⟩, ⟨c⟩, ⟨j⟩, and substituted ⟨f⟩, ⟨kw⟩, ⟨k⟩, ⟨sh⟩, and ⟨f⟩ for the multigraphs ⟨ph⟩, ⟨qu⟩, ⟨ch⟩, ⟨sch⟩, and ⟨pf⟩. The umlauted letters ⟨ä⟩, ⟨ü⟩, and ⟨ö⟩ were also removed. Baumann considered umlauts to be too great a technical difficulty for foreign printing presses, although ⟨ǝ⟩ (Note: Although in Baumann's Wede this letter is described as a "turned e" (German: umgekehrtes e), Baumann may have been describing and using the letter schwa (ə).) was added to partly replace ⟨ö⟩. Baumann removed the use of silent letters, in particular instances of e and h.

Umlauts reappeared in the orthography of Weltdeutsch, where the digraph ⟨eu⟩ was replaced with ⟨eü⟩ – ⟨Deutschland⟩ (Germany) becomes ⟨Deütschland⟩. The letter é was added to represent a long e. Baumann changed ⟨ei⟩ to ⟨ai⟩, ⟨sch⟩ to ⟨sh⟩ (like in Wede), and the suffix ⟨-end⟩ became ⟨-ent⟩. Double letters were replaced with single letter equivalents.

Noun capitalization was also removed in Wede and Weltdeutsch, although in Wede this came with several exceptions, such as proper nouns, the word God, and the formal pronoun Si. Baumann changed German's compounds to put hyphens between stems, so the language's exonym ⟨Weltdeutsch⟩, is rendered ⟨Welt-deütsh⟩ in Weltdeutsch.

== Lexicon ==
Similarly to controlled natural languages such as Charles Kay Ogden's Basic English, Baumann argued that German's lexicon was too large, and eliminated many synonyms from Weltdeutsch, arguing that only two to three thousand words were necessary for daily life. Weltdeutsch removed several minimal pairs and homophones – for example, der Stiel ("the handle") and der Stil ("the style of writing") became de stil and de sraib-art respectively.

The languages were a posteriori, being based mostly on High German, although the languages were influenced by German dialects; several vocabulary substitutions came from Low German varieties, and Baumann stated that Middle High German helped eliminate excess consonants. Apart from German, Oiropa'pitshn's vocabulary was partly drawn from Yiddish; in Weltdeutsch, Baumann had thanked the Jews for spreading di deütshe sprache ("the German language") around the world. Baumann further claimed in 1928 that one of the benefits of his language would be that it would be comprehensible to the "Jews of the world who make up the economy".

== See also ==
- Kolonial-Deutsch, a project for similar purposes by Emil Schwörer
- Language ideology
- Leichte Sprache
- Simplified German
- Weltdeutsch, a previous project by Wilhelm Ostwald
