= Weltdeutsch =

Constructed language

- Wede
- Created by: Wilhelm Ostwald
- Purpose: Constructed: International auxiliary language; Simplified language; Weltdeutsch
- Sources: German

Language codes
- ISO 639-3: qdw (local use). Also used for Coast Yuki
- IETF: art-x-weltdeut (local use)

Weltdeutsch (German pronunciation: [ˈvɛltdɔɪtʃ] VELT-doych, lit. 'World-German') was a proposal for a German-based zonal international auxiliary language by chemist and interlinguist Wilhelm Ostwald. Published in 1916 in Ostwald's Monistic Sunday Sermons (German: Monistische Sonntagspredigten), Weltdeutsch was a reflection of the advance of German nationalism during the First World War – Ostwald had long been a pacifist, being aligned with the German Monistic League founded by Ernst Haeckel.

The language consisted of Standard German with some orthographic and phonemic simplifications, but was never fully developed. After publication, there was little further interest in Weltdeutsch; it was not taken up by any German institutions, and was denounced as an act of chauvinism by the interlinguistic circles which Ostwald had been part of.

== Background ==
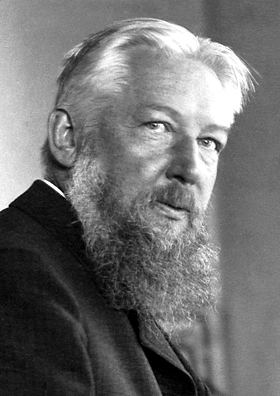
Wilhelm Ostwald, creator of Weltdeutsch

Wilhelm Ostwald was born a Baltic German in Riga, and thus was raised multilingual in Latvian, German, and Russian. Although best known as the 1909 German laureate of the Nobel Prize in Chemistry, Ostwald had a long relationship with interlinguistics, being first introduced to the science via Volapük by physicist Arthur von Oettingen at the University of Tartu. He later became a member of the Delegation for the Adoption of an International Auxiliary Language at the behest of one of its founders, Louis Couturat (later cocreator of Ido) in October 1903, and later assumed chairmanship on 20 November 1906, continuing to chair it in 1907 when it introduced Ido, greatly disrupting the Esperanto movement.

For the majority of his time as a proponent of an international language, Ostwald was an Idist, remaining a proponent of the language after the dissolution of the Delegation, although he spent much time as an Esperantist. Having been invited to be one of Harvard University's visiting scholars by Hugo Münsterberg, he advertised Esperanto to the point of founding 100 Esperanto clubs across the country, and remarking while visiting the Louisiana Purchase Exposition:

Da standen die Männer nebeneinander, die sich gegenseitig das Belangreichste zu sagen hatten, aber sie konnten sich nicht verständigen. Denn wenn die meisten Gelehrten und Praktiker heute auch mehrere Sprachen soweit beherrschen, dass sie Fachabhandlungen lesen können, so ist es doch von diesem Punkte noch eine weite und mühsame Reise zum mündlichen Verkehr in der fremden Sprache. So entstand aus der Not der Gedanke der internationalen Sprache von neuem.

English translation:

The men who had the most important things to tell each other stood there, but they could not understand one another. Even if most of today's scholars and practitioners have mastered several languages to the point of being able to read technical papers, it is still a long and arduous journey hence to the point of oral communication in the foreign language. So, out of these distressing thoughts, arose the idea of an international language once again.

Ostwald eventually left Esperanto for Ido for several reasons, including issues with Esperanto orthography, the irregularities in its grammar, but most importantly the "blind fanaticism often attached to religious movements." Aside from Ido, Ostwald had also joined Peano's Academia pro Interlingua. As an internationalist, Ostwald was also a pacifist, deeming pacifism a "scientific duty".

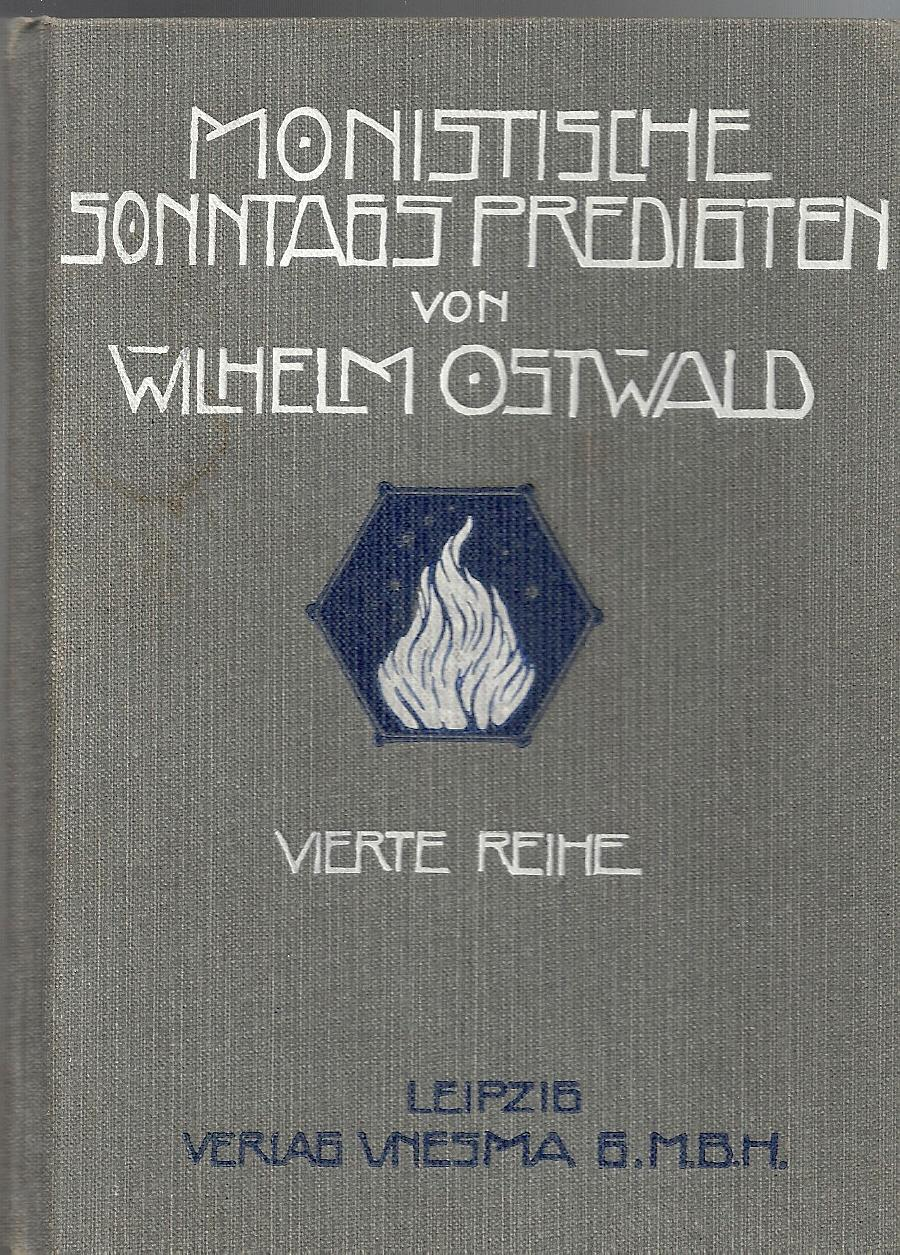
The front cover of the fourth volume of Ostwald's Monistiche Sonntagspredigten

During the First World War, German nationalism was popularised even amongst pacifists such as Ostwald. Ostwald was a signatory of the Manifesto of the Ninety-Three, and expressed his newfound nationalistic sentiments, alongside speeches and sermons, through the creation of his Weltdeutsch, a simplified form of German with the goal of easing learning of the language in countries to be conquered by Germany and occupied by German troops, as part of the German colonial empire. Aside from uses as an easy to learn form of German, Ostwald also promoted Weltdeutsch as a new international language for science. In 1916, Ostwald published the fifth volume of his Monistic Sunday Sermons (German: Monistische Sonntagspredigten), wherein he introduced the language in its 36th chapter, entitled "Weltdeutsch".

From the mid-19th century to Ostwald's project, several other projects for the aim of creating an international German by the use of corpus planning had existed, several of which were under the name Weltdeutsch: that of Dr. N. Lichtenstein in his 1853 book "Pasilogy, or, World Language" (German: Pasilogie, oder, Weltsprache), and Adalbert Baumann's (also known as Wede, amongst many later incarnations). Also of note is Oswald Salzmann's Simplified German (German: Vereinfachtes Deutsch), published in 1913, which partly used an extensive spelling reform to achieve the goal of simplification. Languages created for chauvinistic purposes had also already existed: according to Detlev Blanke, Elias Molee's Tutonish falls under this category.

== Features ==
Outside of the work published in Monistische Sonntagspredigten, little is known about the language; Ostwald left it simply as a theory, without further developing its lexicon or grammar.

Arguing that the "pointless squandering of energy that lies in the multiplicity and irregularity of older linguistic forms" needed to be eliminated, his language included reforms such as a simplification in phonology and orthography, simplifying the use of grammatical gender in the language to one article ("de", as in Dutch), and the removal of the letters <ä>, <ö>, and <ü>, corresponding to the phonemes [ɛ], [ø], and [ʏ], as well as the multigraphs <sh>, <sch>, with the digraph <ts> replaced with <z>.

Weltdeutsch is one of many simplified and regularised constructed languages; other examples in a similar vein include Swedish engineer August Nilson's 1897 Lasonebr, Felix Lenz's Pasilingua Hebraica, French judge Raoul de la Grasserie's 1907 Apolema, and Serafin Bernhard's Lingua franca nuova.

== Reception ==
Weltdeutsch was met with disappointment from the interlinguistic community, and the language was denounced as a product of chauvinism. On 30 December 1915, Ostwald was met by a letter from colleague Leopold Pfaundler, with whom Ostwald had collaborated on the 1911 book International Language and Science, in which Pfaundler wrote:

"Your suggestion of a world German not only seems to be inconsistent with our prior approach and an act of ingratitude, but also entirely hopeless with respect to feasibility. Thus I am making an appeal to you not to continue the plan further, granting us moreover in this besieged time your exceedingly valuable continued cooperation as well. I remain despite the war in contact with Swedish and Danish Idists and dins everywhere the greatest willingness to cooperate. We must advance the work from these neutral states and Switzerland, and not let it slumber."

To this, Ostwald responded: "I was very conscious that my suggestion of Weltdeutsch would arouse displeasure and even also protest among my Ido friends", turning away from the Ido movement:

"I will not publicly turn my back on Ido, since it represents a very significant im-provement over Esperanto under all circumstances, but from the above articulated reasons I can also not any longer expend any special effort on this, in my opinion, hopeless labor."

== See also ==
- Wede, a more complete project to create an international German by the Bavarian Adalbert Baumann.
- Világnyelv, a language by Hungarian mathematician János Bolyai for an international language based on the Hungarian language.
- Colonial German, a German-based constructed pidgin by Emil Schwörer, for use in German colonies.
- Language ideology
