= Panromance =

Panromance may also refer:

- Panromantic
- Pan-Romance language
- Pan-Romanism

== See also ==
- Paranormal romance
