= Neolatino Romance =

Codified pan-Romance language project

- Neolatino
- Romance neolatino
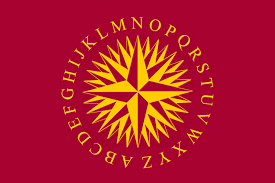
- Flag for the project Vía Neolatina
- Created by: Jordi Cassany Bates
- Date: 2006
- Setting and usage: Pan-Romance communication
- Purpose: International auxiliary language: Zonal auxiliary language; Pan-Romance language; Neolatino Romance
- Writing system: Latin script
- Sources: Romance languages and Vulgar Latin

Official status
- Development body: Vía Neolatina

Language codes
- ISO 639-3: None (mis)
- IETF: art-x-neolatin

Neolatino Romance, or simply called Neolatino (Romance neolatino in Neolatino), is a pan-Romance language, that is, a codified linguistic variety based on the Romance languages. It has been proposed as a standard language for the entire Romance family, and thus an auxiliary zonal constructed language enabling communication between speakers of different Romance languages. The development of the language was intended as a linguistic innovation, not to serve any political or nationalistic ideology.

Neolatino aims to be a hypothetical natural evolution of Vulgar Latin in a way most intuitive to native speakers of other Romance languages, thus staying true to the shared grammatical and structural nuances these languages have. This means that to an outsider of the Romance languages, Neolatino may not necessarily be the easier to learn than the rest of Romance languages, however, it aims to be as mutually intelligible as possible with all of them.

== Introduction ==
Neolatino emerged as a standard language with a strictly Romance basis, unlike other similar language projects such as Interlingua. Interlingua is an artificial language project, created by the International Auxiliary Language Association (IALA), whose objective was initially to evaluate existing artificial languages and make the necessary recommendations for the adoption of an artificial language as a common language between them.

Neolatino, on the other hand, is not based on any artificial language; Instead it is made following criteria recommended by linguistic science. The main objective of Neolatino is not to promote the adoption of an auxiliary international language for the whole world, but to help the communication of "the various speakers of modern Latin (Romance languages) through their own" (Martín Rincón, 2016). Therefore, unlike Interlingua, Neolatino does not use innovative principles, but is based on the codification theory developed by linguists such as Lamuela, Castellanos and Sumien. This essential development takes into account the entire existing Romance linguistic system.

The objective of the language is therefore to facilitate and Dignify pan-Latin communication, which is why the project of this language, properly called Via Neolatina, aims to recover the original essence of the Latin or Romance languages and their traditional standards. The language model presented is a synthesis of the Romance variation that attempts to be representative of the Romance as a whole: a new and common variety, but at the same time natural and plural that allows its speakers to communicate throughout the Latin world. It is also a useful language for non-speakers of Latin languages as an easier way of accessing these languages.

There have been several forerunner for a pan-Romance language, some of them codified in auxiliary languages. In 1947, André Schild created a language called Neolatin, and later, in 1948, a Portuguese linguist, João Campos Lima, proposed a language, International, with the goal of being an alternative to Esperanto for international communication. Later, in 2001, Richard Sorfleet and Josu Lavin created Interlingua Romanica and years later, Raymund Zacharias and Thiago Sanctus created Interromanic in 2017, also as proposals for pan-Latin communication. In 2010, a proposal by linguist Clayton Cardoso, Olivarianu, also appeared, but as an artificial artistic language inserted within a fictional world.

Along with Neolatino, there are also other parallel projects in other European language families. Of them, the most advanced and developed, is Interslavic, of which development began in 2006 with the name Slovianski, years before it adopted the current name of Interslavic. Later, this project was merged with another similar project of a common Pan-Slavic language, New Slavic, promoted by the Czech linguist Vojtěch Merunka.

== History ==
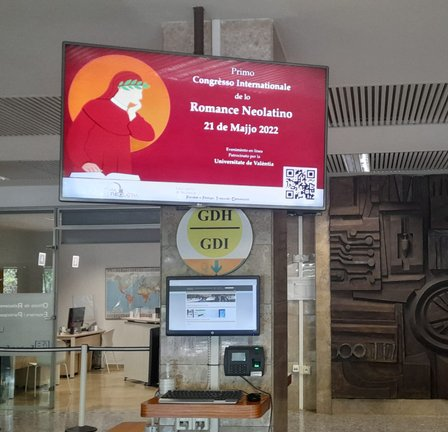
Celebration of the first Congress about Neolatino at University of Valencia (2022).

=== Conception ===
The language was started in 2006 by Romance-language researcher Jordi Cassany Bates and was subsequently developed by a first small community: an international and interdisciplinary project called Vía Neolatina, which brings together linguists and other professionals from different Latin countries.

In 2019, a basic grammar book (Grammatica Essentiale Neolatina) and dictionary (Dictionario Essentiale Neolatino) were published, which reformed some aspects of a preliminary model published in 2012.

By January 2021, A Facebook group dedicated to learning Neolatino reached 700 followers, and the creation of dedicated groups in other websites followed, including a blog called Mondo Neolatino by Cassany, and Lo espàzio, by Martín Rincón, Neolatino is also briefly talked about in an article published by Global Academic Journal of Linguistics and Literature, titled "The Environment of Language Creation from the Perspective of European Geopolitics: A Case Study of the Rise of Pan-nationalist Zonal Constructed Languages", which touches upon the emergence of zonal constructed languages, including pan-Germanic and pan-Slavic on top of pan-Romantic.

In 2022, with the support of multiple linguists, Vía Neolatina celebrates its first congress at University of Valencia.

== Phonology ==
The official Neolatin phonology is composed of the most common phonemes found in modern Romance languages, minimizing the amount of new sounds a speaker of any other Romance language would need to learn.

Note that some sounds like /ɲ/ or /ʎ/ are not present in all modern Romance languages and speakers are allowed to pronounce them in other ways that can sound similar such as /nj/ and /lj/.

In Neolatin, vowels in open syllables are lengthened, similarly to some modern Romance languages such as Italian.

Consonants
	Labial		Alveolar		Palatal/ Post-alveolar		Velar	
Nasal		m		n		ɲ		
Stop	p	b	t	d			k	ɡ
Affricate			ts	dz/z	tʃ	dʒ/ʒ		
Fricative	f	v	s	dz/z	ʃ	dʒ/ʒ		
Approximant		w				j		(w)
Lateral				l		ʎ		
Trill			r					
Flap			ɾ					

Vowels
	Front	Back
Closed	i	u
Mid-closed	e	o
Mid-open	ɛ	ɔ
Open	a	

== Grammar ==
=== Alphabet ===
Neolatino uses the basic 26 letter Latin alphabet, although several letters (mainly K, W and Y) are only used in loan words.

Basic Alphabet
Letter	Name	Pronunciation	Leter	Name	Pronunciation
A a	A	a	N n	Ènne	n
B b	Be	b	O o	O	o or ɔ*
C c	Ce	k before a, o, u tʃ before e, i	P p	Pe	p
D d	De	d	Q q	Cu	k
E e	E	e or ɛ*	R r	Èrre	ɾ or r*
F f	Èffe	f	S s	Èsse	s
G g	Ge	ɡ before a, o, u dʒ before e, i	T t	Te	t
H h	Hacca	-	U u	U	u
I i	I	i	V v	Ve	v
J j	Jota	dʒ~ʒ*	W w	Ve dople	w
K k	Ca	k	X x	Ics	ks
L l	Èlle	l	Y y	I grèca	i or j
M m	Èmme	m	Z z	Zèta	dz~z*

Other Graphemes
Letter(s)	Pronunciation	Letter(s)	Pronunciation
À à	a	NÎ nî	ɲ
CH ch	k before e, i	Ò ò	ɔ
CÎ cî	tʃ before a, o, u	Ó ó	o
È è	ɛ	QU qu	kw*
É é	e	RR rr	r
GH gh	ɡ before e, i	SÎ sî	ʃ
GÎ gî	dʒ before a, o, u	TI ti	tsj when followed by another vowel
Í í	i	TI ti	tsj when followed by another vowel
LÎ lî	ʎ	Ú ú	u

Notes:

- Neolatino makes use of gemination, which lengthens the pronunciation of a consonant and is represented in written form by doubling it.
- The letters e and o will be pronounced /e/ and /o/ respectively whenever they are not marked with a diacritic, or marked with an acute accent, but will be pronounced as /ɛ/ and /ɔ/ whenever marked with a grave accent.
- The letters j and z can be pronounced as affricates or as fricatives. The commonly accepted method is to pronounce them as fricatives (/z/, /ʒ/) whenever they are not geminated, and as affricates (/dz/, /dʒ/) when geminated.
- The grapheme qu is meant to be pronounced /kw/ but with a couple of exceptions like the monosyllabic words ''que'' and ''qui'', where the u is silent.
- The letter r should be pronounced /ɾ/ when appearing once between two vowels, and should be pronounced /r/ when appearing twice in a row or at the beginning of a word.
- The letter î (i with circumflex accent) appears exclusively as part of the digraphs cî, gî, lî, nî, sî as a way of indicating the palatalization of the respective consonants.

=== Stress and diacritics ===
In Neolatino, words can be oxytones (have their stress on their final syllable), paroxytones (have their stress on their penultimate syllable) or proparoxytones (have their stress on their antepenultimate syllable). And which group each word belongs in depends on spelling and the use of graphic accents. The grave accent is used in open vowels (à, è, ò) While the acute accent is used in closed vowels (é, í, ó, ú).

In terms of spelling affecting the stress, words can be divided into two groups:

- Words ending in the letters a, e, i, n, o, s, t or u. By default words ending on these letters will be paroxitones. If this rule isn't broken then the stressed vowel does not need a graphic accent, otherwise the stressed vowel should be marked.
- Words that do not end on the aforementioned letters are very rare, but by default they will be oxytones. Once again if this rule is broken the stressed vowel should be marked.

This means that:

- Oxytone words are marked with a graphic accent if they end on a vowel or the consonants n, s or t.
- Paroxytone words are marked with a graphic accent if they end on consonants excluding n, s or t.
- Proparoxytone words are always marked.

== Vocabulary ==
The vocabulary in Neolatino mainly takes from late Latin. However, in the event of discrepancies between Latin and modern Romance languages, giving the fact that all living Romance languages are more closely related amongst themselves than to Latin, Neolatino favors the more widely spread modern vocabulary. It also favours any vocabulary of Romance origin over other linguistic families such as vocabulary of Germanic origin.

In any case, Neolatino looks at the morphological relations between Latin languages and applies a regular but naturalistic evolution, based on how modern Romance languages have evolved from Latin such as palatalization of consonants, or a vowel shift that abandons length distinction in favour of openness distinction.

Comparisons of the different Romance vowels
Neolatino	Latin	Portuguese	Spanish	Catalan	French	Italian	Romanian
vino cinque	vīnum cīnque	vinho cinco	vino cinco	vi cinc	vin cinq	vino cinque	vin cinci
sete secco	sĭtim sĭccum	sede seco	sed seco	set sec	soif sec	sete secco	sete sec
parete cresce	parētem crēscim	parede cresce	pared crece	paret creix	paroi croît	parete cresce	parete crește
mèle fèrro	mĕle fĕrrum	mel ferro	miel hierro	mel ferro	miel fer	miele ferro	miere fier
mare vacca	mare vaccam	mar vaca	mar vaca	mar vaca	mer vache	mare vacca	mare vacă
nòvo còrno	nŏvum cŏrnu	novo corno	nuevo cuerno	nou corn	neuf corne	nuovo corno	nou corn
flore tocca	flōrem tōccat	flor toca	flor toca	flor toca	fleur touche	fiore tocca	floare toacă
jóvene bocca	iŭvenem bŭcca	jovem boca	joven boca	jove boca	jeune bouche	giovane bocca	june gură
luna fuste	lūnam fūstem	lua fuste	luna fuste	lluna fust	lune fût	luna fusto	lună fuște
