= Pan-Romance language =

Constructed language representing Romance languages

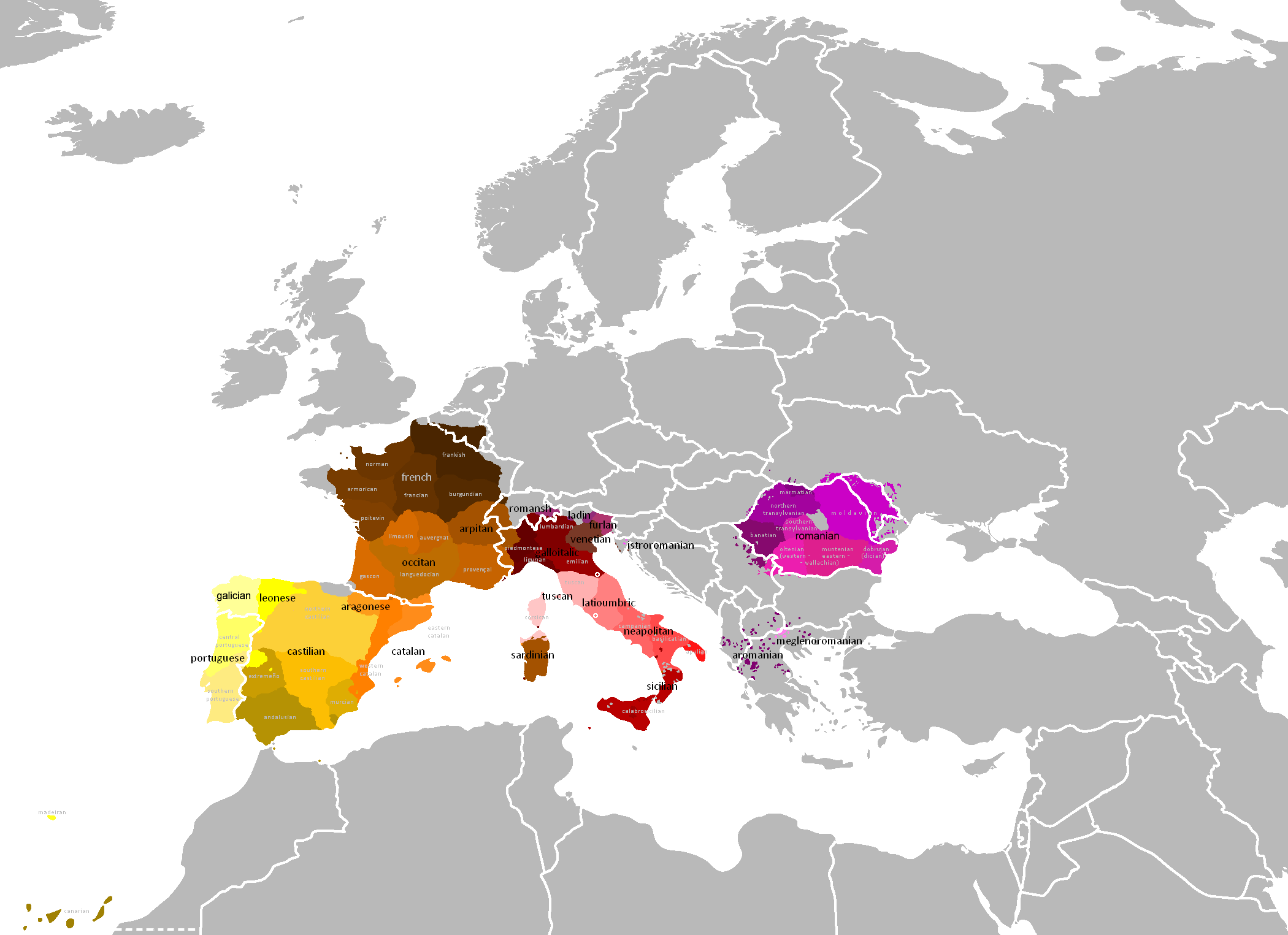
Romance languages in Europe

A pan-Romance language or Romance interlanguage is a codified linguistic variety which synthesizes the variation of the Romance languages and is representative of these as a whole. It can be seen as a standard language proposal for the whole language family but is generally considered a zonal constructed language because it's the result of intense codification (that is, more construction, planning, design, engineering, manipulation than what regular standard languages usually require). Zonal languages are, according to interlinguist Detlev Blanke, constructed languages which "arise by choosing or mixing linguistic elements in a language group" (meaning elements from one same language family, for example Slavic or Germanic).

Several pan-Romance languages have been developed by different individuals or groups in different times (since the 19th century) and places (Brazil, Canada, Denmark, Italy, Norway, Portugal, Spain, Switzerland, etc.). They are so similar to each other that they have been considered variations of a same language: 'dialects' is how Campos Lima, one of the developers, refers to several projects of his time. This author also shows that the developers of pan-Romance language projects are generally aware of each other, are in contact and even collaborate, which is another sign of unity.

Pan-Romance languages are parallel to pan-Slavic languages and pan-Germanic languages.

== Uses and benefits ==
A pan-Romance language is typically intended for communication amongst (or with) speakers of Romance languages, that is as a regional international auxiliary language, for the Latin world. Its vocabulary and grammar are codified to be as communicative as possible for Romance speakers. Words, for example, are chosen preferably if they have cognates among many Romance languages, especially if the meaning is the same or similar. As a result, and thanks to intercomprehension, it's potentially understandable by an audience of up to 800 million speakers of Romance languages. In addition, it can complement Romance intercomprehension in situations where this communication strategy isn't so effective (for example, between French and Romanian speakers).

A pan-Romance language can be meant, in some -especially older- projects, to become a global international auxiliary language, to replace English in that role, which is also the aim of Esperanto and Interlingua (IALA). In this case, the reason for its Latin/Romance basis is that much international vocabulary (that is, words which are common to the most internationally influential languages, many of which are European) is of Latin origin. In the opinion of the developers of these pan-Romance languages, the most natural and coherent grammar to use with this international vocabulary is that of the Romance languages, which evolved from Latin and are, furthermore, spoken by millions of people on different continents.

A pan-Romance language can even be intended, in certain projects, as an artistic language (as a means of artistic expression in poetry, music, etc., as part of a fantasy world in novels, films, etc. or just for the pleasure of creating it).

In addition, developers of pan-Romance languages suggest other uses and benefits: the language can benefit from contributions from Romance's different varieties, which improve and enrich it (with regularizations, expressive means, etc.); it can be a shelter for speakers of Romance languages which are vanishing, like Occitan or Sardinian; it could be effective as a middle step in machine translation between Romance languages; it can be used as a bridge to Romance languages (present and old) and Latin; and it can be practical for foreign speakers as an introduction to Romance.

== Background ==
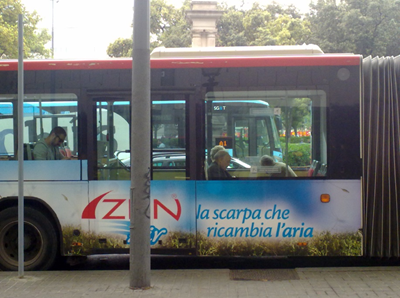
Shoe advert in Italian on a bus in Barcelona (2011).

Latin's descendants, the Romance languages, have developed important differences but share so many traits that they have been considered a unity (a "type") by Romance linguist Michael Metzeltin. He explains the cohesion of the family by its shared Vulgar Latin inheritance, the use and influence of standard Latin until recently and the constant exchanges between Neolatin peoples.

The language family as a whole can be referred to as 'Romance', and it still functions as one language or macrolanguage in some present-day situations, where intercomprehension or accommodation (partial assimilation) take place. For example, some adverts (or parts of them) are published in foreign Romance languages (the attached image shows an advert in Italian on a bus in Barcelona). And mixed varieties like Portuñol or Frespañol arise spontaneously to communicate with speakers of other Romance languages, for example while visiting their country. All this shows that spoken and written communication amongst Romance speakers is still a reality and that, to some extent, they are a linguistic community.

A manifestation of the tight relationship between different Romance speakers and peoples are the migration flows between Latin countries: Romanians, for example, emigrate preferably to Italy and Spain. And Neolatin countries created in 1954 the Latin Union, an international organization of nations that use Romance languages, which functioned until 2012.

Despite these tight connections, since French has been largely displaced as an international auxiliary language by English, which is a Germanic language, the Latin world lacks a common native language model for the first time in history.

=== The idea of a pan-Romance language since the Middle Ages ===
Standard Latin, which preceded French as an international auxiliary language, undergoes lexical modernization to the present day but is based on Classical Latin, the language stage of the late Roman Republic to middle Roman Empire (75 BC to AD 3rd century). The idea of substituting it by a common Romance standard language can be traced back to Dante Alighieri (c. 1265–1321), who in his essay De vulgari eloquentia deals with the problem of identifying a vernacular language (that is, not Latin) which could be suitable for literary purposes. He starts by compiling a map of the languages he knows, dividing the European territory into three parts: one to the east, with Greek; one to the north, with Germanic (which he believed included Hungarian and Slavic); one to the south, with Romance. He chooses Romance, for being his language, and then carries on his search by distinguishing in Romance three smaller languages, which he identifies by their word for 'yes': oc language, oïl language and sì language. He chooses the last variety, arguing that it's more similar to Latin, the literary language of the moment, and has more poets. He then assesses the many Italian varieties in which he subdivides the sì language, but considers no variety suitable. Dante comes to the conclusion that the illustrious vernacular (volgare illustre) which he seeks must still be developed, combining elements from the various Italian varieties.

After Dante, many other people have conceived independently the idea of a common Romance standard language or even a pan-Romance language, and not only the developers of the projects presented here. For example, Romance scholar Rebecca Posner (University of Oxford) declared that "It is not impossible to conceive a Romance interlanguage" and interlinguist Detlev Blanke (Humboldt University of Berlin) spoke of a "Hochromanisch" (in reference to Hochdeutsch, the standard variety of German).

== Pan-Romance languages in the 19th and 20th centuries ==
=== Lingua Romana ===
Lingua Romana is an artistic language which the German poet Stefan George (1868–1933) used in part of his lyrical work. He started using Lingua Romana, a mixed Romance language, at a young age, in 1889. It is his own artistic creation, closest to Spanish but with elements from Italian and (Vulgar) Latin. The combinations are motivated by their sound effect in the poems, according to Radaelli. George himself explains Lingua Romana with these words (in Spanish): "La idea que desde mi juventud me atormenta [...][es] concebir yo mismo una lengua literaria para mis propios fines a partir de material claro, románico, de similar sonoridad así como fácilmente comprensible." Some of his poems in Lingua Romana are La Rosa Galba and Paz, which he later translated into German.

Lingua Romana was later codified and proposed for pan-Latin communication in 1991 (see Romano, further down).

==== Sample text in Lingua Romana ====
Se ha facto la sera tranquila,

Jo son en mea cámera inturbato,

Ahora haberia tempo pro curarme de toto.

Ma sto magnetizato

Dirigendo los oclos verso la lampa

Reflectata indistinctamente

En el obscuro speculo de la nocte.

No volo plus pensar, no poto.

Voleria sólamente clinar los genos,

Nil pensar, apauco precar.

=== Neolatino (Ørberg) ===
Neolatino is a Romance zonal auxiliary language intended to be used as a global international auxiliary language. It was developed by Danish Latinist Hans Henning Ørberg (1920–2010), known for his method for learning Latin, Lingua Latina per se Illustrata, first published in 1955. All the information available on this Neolatino is offered by the developer of another pan-Romance language, Campos Lima, who mentions it and publishes a letter that Ørberg had sent him in 1941. In this letter, Ørberg explains that he has started to work on a new international language, which he calls Neolatino, based on the Romance languages only and without artificial elements. According to Campos Lima, it had nominal agreement in gender and number and verbal personal inflexion, with more irregularities than Campos Lima's own pan-Romance language 'internacional' (see below); but Ørberg didn't publish his project and by 1947 had abandoned it in favour of a more simplified and regularized language.

=== Neolatino (Schild) ===
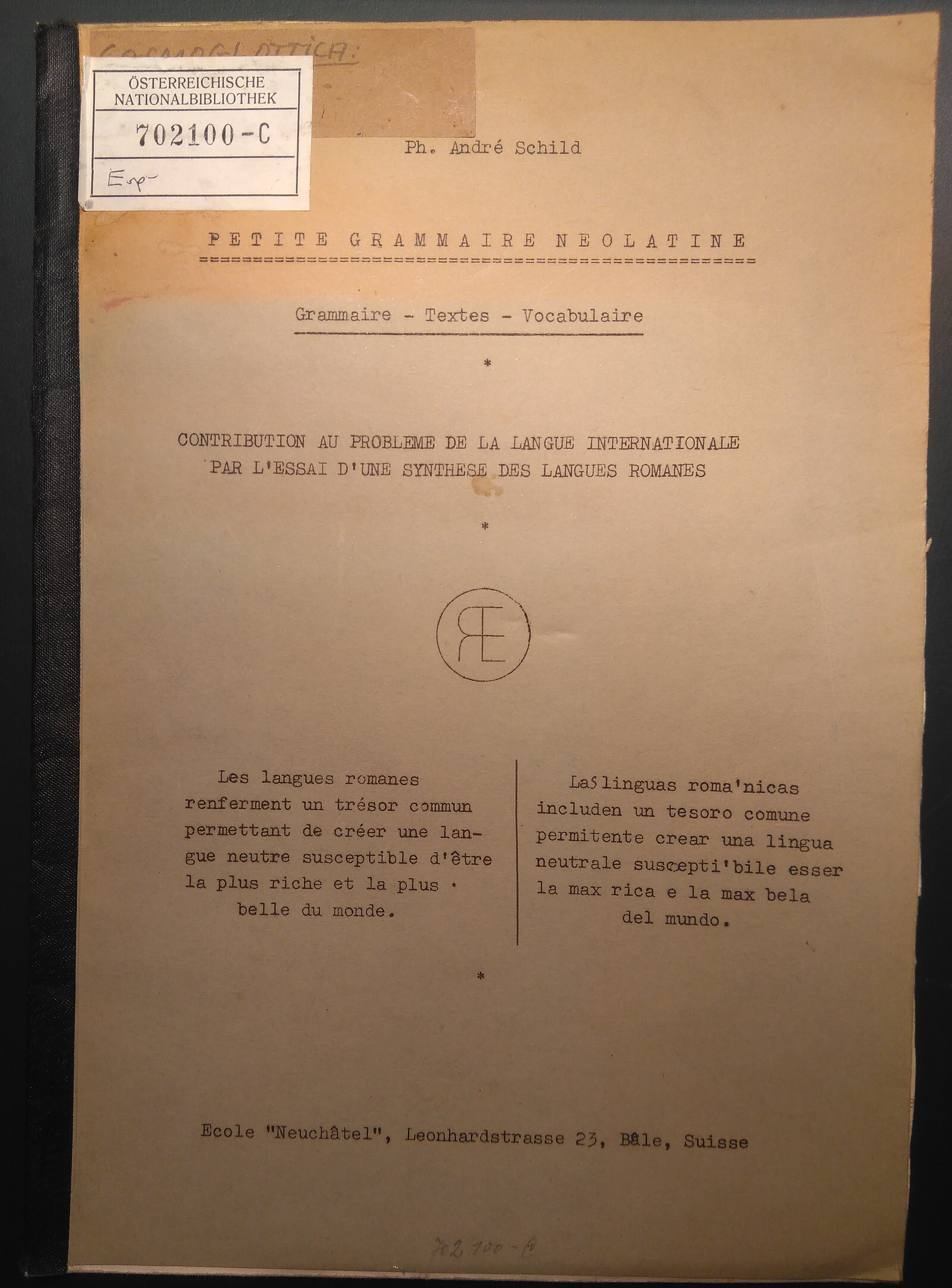
Petite Grammaire Neolatine, by Schild (1947), front page.

Neolatino is a Romance zonal auxiliary language proposed to be used as a global international auxiliary language. It was developed by francophone Swiss linguist André Schild (1910–1981), who presented it in Petite Grammaire Neolatine, published in January 1947. This first work includes grammar, vocabulary and sample texts. An international group of supporters was founded shortly after, which published in Neolatino a bulletin with texts from several authors (Buletino del Grupo Internacionale Neolatinista de Correspondentes) from May 1947 until, at least, February 1949 (18 numbers). Later in 1947, Schild published an extended dictionary in Vocabulario Neolatino: Francese-Italiano-Hispano. In 1948, a group improved and further developed the language: Comitato Linguístico Neolatino, with Schild as its president. R. L. Stevenson's tale Will o' the mill: The plain and the stars was translated into Neolatino by H. Littlewood as Gulielmo del molino: La planura e las stelas.

==== Sample text in Neolatino ====
Lo NEOLATINO (NL) ha sito creato dal Suisso francese André Schild, pos vinte annos de studios interlinguísticos, secondo lo principio de la naturalitate integrale combinata con lo máximum de regularitate. Ilo usa ex lo latino solo to qui es ancora vivente e possede la gramática comune a los idiomas neolatinos. Sua base románica le confere l'uniformitate e l'unitate que besonia. In ultra, include un vocabulario internacionale comprensíbile ad omni Europeo ed a chascún non-Europeo de media cultural europea. Seligendo solamente la materia vivente, se pote, mediante alcunas excepciones in la conjugacione, obtener un sistema perfectamente naturale. Lo NL, aplicando exclusivamente régulas naturales, es superiore a los altros sitemas [Esperanto, Ido, Latino-sine, Occidental, etc.] cujos máximos defectos son contenitos in los principios. Existerán sempre alcunas formas dutosas, ma estas non poten poner lo sistema in perículo si non apartienen a suo fundamento.

=== Internacional ===
Internacional (or 'lingua internacional') is a Romance zonal auxiliary language proposed to be used as a global international auxiliary language. It was developed by Portuguese lawyer João Evangelista Campos Lima (1887–1956), who presented it in Gramática internacional, published in 1948.

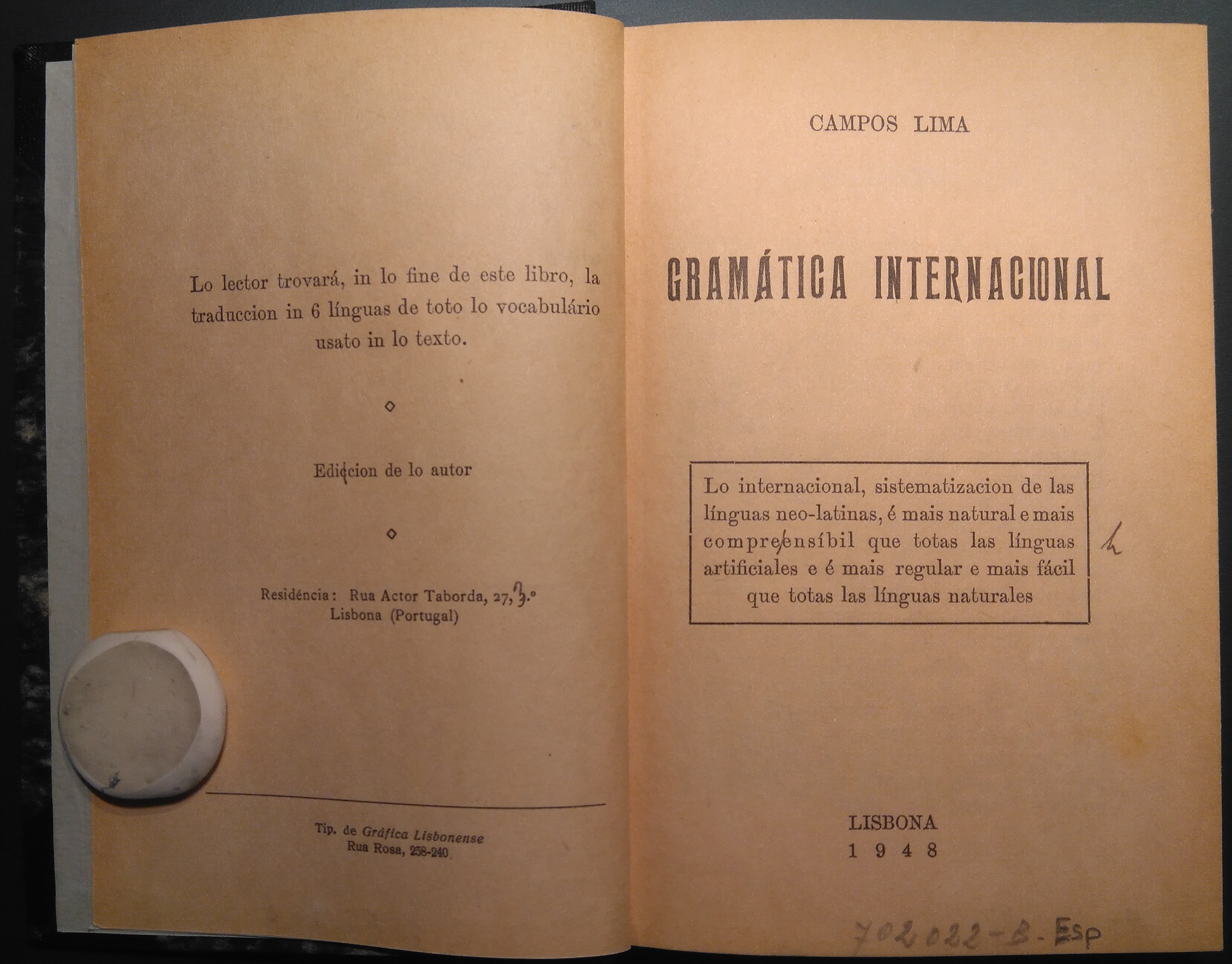
Gramatica Internacional, by Campos Lima (1948), pages 2–3.

==== Sample text in Internacional ====
La prima qualitate que debe haber lo interncional è, evidentemente, la internacionalitate. Dunque, deben esser seleccionatos de preferéncia vocábulos autónomos internacionales o aqueles que donan, con perfecta regularitate, vários derivatos internacionales.

Ma, perque quási totos los vocábulos internacionales son latinos, una altra qualitate è inherente a la major parte de los étimos a seleccionar: la latinitate. Lo internacional è, dunque, constituito, in sua major parte, per vocábulos latinos o de orígine latina.

Sine dúbita que una língua, mesmo seleccionata, non pot esser formata solo per vocábulos latinos e internacionales. Ha que se recurrer anque a altros vocábulos, que poten non esser latinos ni internacionales ma que son necessários pro facer la ligacion con los altros vocábulos in las frases. La condicion principal que se exige in esses vocábulos è: la naturalitate. Tamen, esses vocábulos non latinos deben esser seleccionatos de preferéncia de las línguas neo-latinas. Per que? Per una altra qualitate que una lingua debe haber: la homogeneitate.

=== Romano ===
Romano is the result of the codification of Stefan George's Lingua Romana, a Romance artistic language which the German poet used in part of his lyrical work (see above). This codification is known through Grammatica de la lingua Romana de Stefan George (1991), an anonymous manuscript preserved at the Sammlung für Plansprachen in Vienna. Romano is proposed to be used as a regional international auxiliary language for the Latin world.

==== Sample text in Romano ====
Stefan George (1868–1933), poeta de dimensión Europea no se conformaba con su idioma materno, el alemán. Su aspiración poética visaba una universalitat de expresión humana qui ja de séc(u)los existaba como bene spiritual de multos pópulos: el Romano. Esta base lingüística era pro él medio poético e(d) un instrumento de arte. Por este facto George nos vocaba en nostra memoria la herencia latente, sepultata en una evolución de séculos. Potemos traherla a la luz del di – no a manera de romanistas scientíficos, pero ma(gi)s en la actitúdine de artistas del renascimento, pro los cuales objectos arqueológicos fueron inspiración viva pro novas op(e)ras de arte.

Pro eso el Romano de la Rosa Galba no es un novo Esperanto. En el Esperanto el mundo ha un perfecto idioma auxiliar de formato universal. La Rosa Galba es regional e medio de expresión de una cultura qui no pretenda esser melior que altras.

Varios intentos han stato factos pro reconstituir este idioma común, multas vices con intención misionária. Seamos magis modestos:

El Romano no pote „salvar el mundo“. Pero es el ligamen de una comunitate aperta, en la cual poten prender parte totos los qui lo volan.Si el Romano será veramente una lingua aplicata en la práctica decide el futuro. [...]

Come hemos dicto, el Romano es un idioma libre. Comencemos purtropo fixando alcunas regulas generales pro obtener una evolución equilibrata, qui condusca a una relativa unitate linguística, fomentata en el futuro tanbene de una specie de academia.

== Pan-Romance languages in the 21st century ==
=== Interlingua Romanica ===
Interlingua Romanica (or simply 'Romanica') is a Romance zonal auxiliary language proposed to be used as a regional international auxiliary language for the Latin world. It is a reformed version of the constructed international auxiliary language Interlingua and was developed in 2001 by the English-speaking Canadian interlingualist Richard Sorfleet and the Spanish- and Basque-speaking Basque school teacher Josu Lavin. They presented it on the internet that same year on Latinity's Day (15 May, a celebration established by the Latin Union). The original Interlingua's grammar was presented by Gode and Blair in 1951 as "A Proposed Grammatical System for the International Language" but it has since been used generally by the interlinguistic community. Fifty years later, Sorfleet and Lavin proposed for Interlingua a new grammar, which incorporates some typical Romance features that are missing in traditional Interlingua: nominal agreement, verbal personal inflexion, etc. As a result, Interlingua Romanica shares vocabulary with Interlingua (with minor modifications) but proposes a more Romance grammar. This Romance version of the grammar isn't intended to replace the previous simple one, but is thought as a variant which Romance speakers can use if they regard the traditional one too unnatural. According to the developers, it could increase Romance speakers' interest in Interlingua and it shouldn't be an obstacle for someone who already knows Interlingua with its traditional grammar.

Interlingua Romanica has been abandoned by its proponents (the last one, Lavin, in 2008), but has still a small community of users and continues to attract interest of new people, often through Interlingua. A Facebook group with 175 members (October 2019) and several internet pages are devoted to Interlingua Romanica.

There are other proposals to reform Interlingua. A slightly older project is Modern Latin or Latino Moderne by David Th. Stark (1996), which includes verbal personal inflection but not nominal agreement. It has not built a community, but has attracted attention. Another project is Modern Latin or Latino Moderne by Alexandre Rousset (2001), which does not modify Interlingua's simplified grammar but its vocabulary (phonetic orthography, modernization of words, elimination of the ancient ones without posterity). Modern Latin is directed to the general Romance public, which can understand it almost entirely without previous study, particularly with its first published book Manual de anglese pro refusantes. In any case, unlike Interlingua Romanica, these two projects cannot be considered pan-Romance, as they lack some typical Romance grammatical features.

==== Sample text in Interlingua Romanica ====
Interlingua et Interlingua Romanica son duos usages grammaticales differentes et complementarios de la mesma lingua. Los dictionarios, dunque, son identicos.

Version in Interlingua:

Interlingua e Interlingua Romanica es duo usages grammatical differente e complementari del mesme lingua. Le dictionarios, dunque, es identic.

=== Romance Neolatino ===
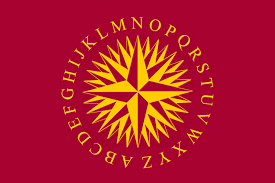
Logo for the project Vía Neolatina.

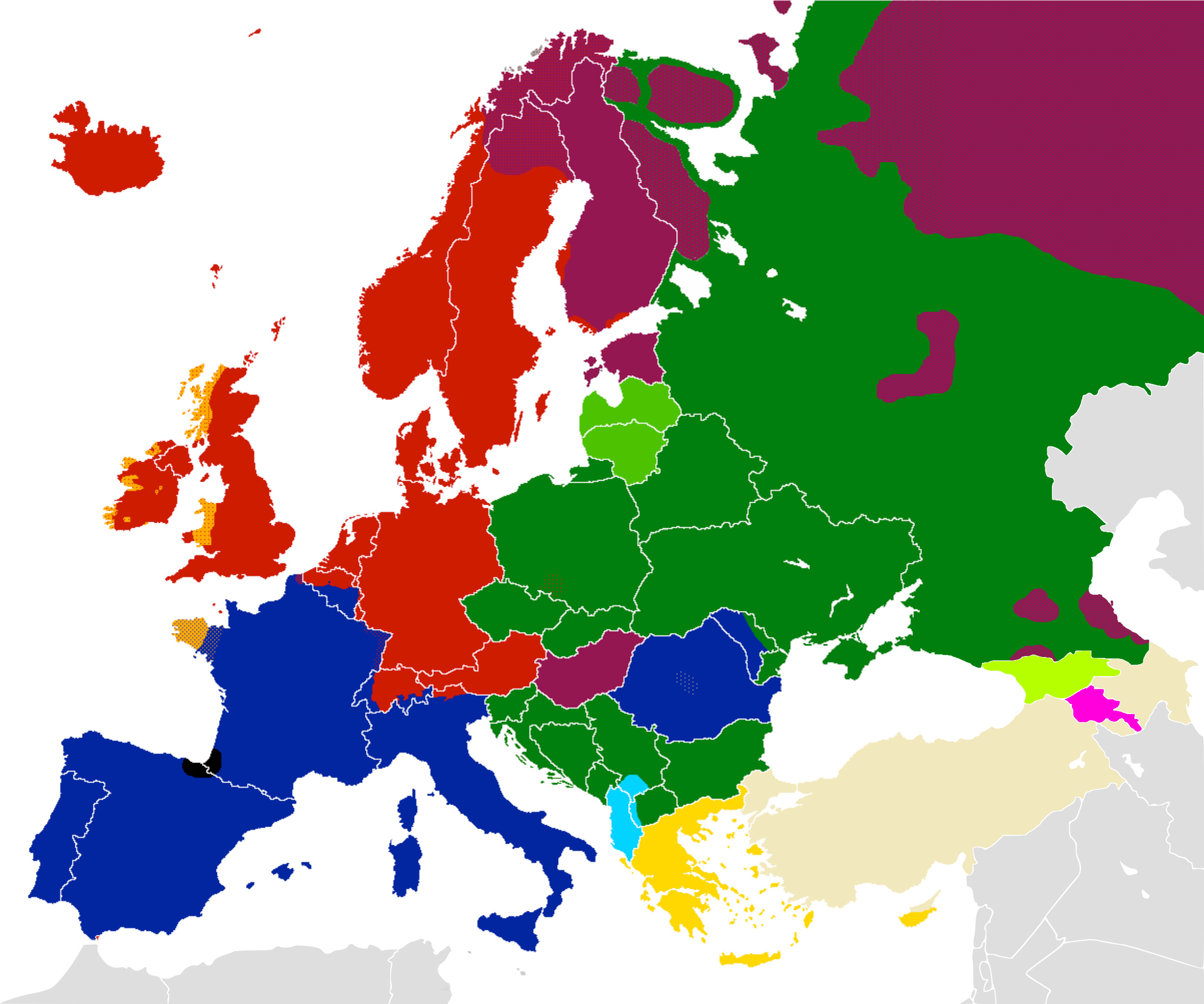
Language families in Europe

Neolatino Romance (or simply 'Neolatino') is a naturalistic pan-Romance zonal auxiliary language, proposed as a standard language for Romance as a whole, to ease communication amongst or with speakers of Romance languages, complementing (not substituting) the standards that exist locally (Portuguese, Spanish, etc.). In addition to its intended role in the Latin world, Romance Neolatino is proposed to build an alternative language policy for Europe in combination with interlanguages for other language families (like Interslavic).

This standard language was started in 2006 by the Romance scholar Jordi Cassany Bates and is now developed and promoted by a collective, international and interdisciplinary project called Vía Neolatina, which gathers linguists and other professionals from different Latin countries. A basic grammar and dictionary was published in 2019: Grammatica Essentiale Neolatina and Dictionario Essentiale Neolatino, which reform some aspects of a preliminary model published in 2012.

==== Design principles ====
The linguists of Vía Neolatina intend to design or codify a pan-Romance standard in a scientific way, and to do so they pay special attention to its design principles (including values, goals, methodology, etc.). The design principles developed by Vía Neolatina are based on theoretical insights from applied linguistics; codifications for particular Romance languages (Grisons Romansh, Occitan, Catalan, Galician, etc.) which experts have designed; other interlanguages, both Romance and of other families (like Interslavic); and the experience of its members with Neolatin.

The developed methodology takes into account various criteria for the selection of forms. Each of the criteria is a positive quality of standard languages in general: forms should ideally be intelligible, used by the majority, encompassing, regular, traditional, concise, etc. They add up to more than 20 linguistic and extralinguistic criteria, all treated equally in the present version of the methodology. When no form is clearly positive in more ways than other forms, the methodology provides the codifiers with some resources: compositionality (inclusion of elements from different varieties), polymorphism (inclusion of options from which the user can choose), centrality (priorization of forms from geographically central varieties), innovation (creation of neologisms and new analogies, but strictly avoiding artificiality), etc. All this is done with the intention of developing a language model which is more easily acceptable by the potential users and more effective for communication.

==== Phonology and Orthography ====
Neolatino uses a phonology designed from the analysis of how Latin languages have evolved, the result is a phonology very similar to modern Romance languages that minimizes the amount of sounds a native speaker of any of them would need to learn. Some examples of sounds that have appeared in most Romance languages despite not existing in Latin are the palatalized ɲ and ʎ which Neolatino incorporates into its inventory, indicating the palatalization with the digraphs nî and lî. This is also used for the digraphs cî, gî and sî which represent the phonemes tʃ, dʒ and ʃ respectively (Note that the digraphs ch and gh are used to represent k and ɡ before front vowels).

A great percentage of the words in the language are paroxitones with a vowel or the consonants n, s or t as their final letter. However, words that deviate from this norm use graphic accents to mark the actual stressed syllable, these also sometimes do double duty as they can indicate the openness of some of the vowels. Specifically, the grave accent is used for the open and semi-open vowels: à, è and ò, while the acute accent is used for the closed or semi-closed vowels: é, í, ó and ú.

==== Sample text in Romance Neolatino ====
Por facilitare et altrosí dignificare la communicatione inter- et panlatina actuale, lo projècto Vía Neolatina ha recuperato et actualizzato lo latino, orígine de las lenguas neolatinas aut romànicas et traditionale stàndarde commune. Lo modèllo de lengua que presènta cui èst una síntese de la variatione romànica que pròva de essere representativa de lo ensèmole; una varietate nòva et commune mais en lo mesmo tèmpo naturale et plurale que permette ad lo usuario communicare-se en toto lo Mondo Latino adaptando-la ad los soos interèsses et necessitates. Èst útile tanto ad latinos quanto ad non latinos que necessitan una pòrta de ingrèsso centrale ad lo romance, uno pònte vèrso divèrsos romances particulares.

=== Latino Interromanico ===
Latino Interromanico (or simply 'Interromance' in English, or 'Interromanico' in the language itself) is a Romance zonal auxiliary language proposed to be used as a regional international auxiliary language for the Latin world. It was started in 2017 by European (German-Romanian) programmer Raymund Zacharias, who published an outline of the language in an internet site devoted to the project. Zacharias intends Interromanico to be used as a bridge to the Romance languages, that is as a didactic resource or strategy, but also as a communication tool. In order to achieve that and mimic the mappings of form and meaning for words and word parts as found in the Romance languages, their etymology is traced to common roots (most often Latin, but also Greek and others). These base forms by default then only receive a minimal adjustment to adhere to the grammar and spelling of Interromance. In order to produce text or speech that is as universally understood as possible, the words and word parts are checked to have as many cognates as possible within the different Romance linguistic variety groups. Flavorizations are possible in order to increase the comprehension to specific target groups or to indicate certain trends. Since 2019, Interromanico has received another definition in Grammatica dello Latino Interromanico by Brazilian Thiago Sanctus, who intends it to be used as a more complete reference for acquiring knowledge of the language. A Facebook group and an active WhatsApp group with ca. 45 members (October 2019) are devoted to Latino Interromanico.

==== Sample text in Latino Interromanico ====
Lo scopo dello Latino Interromanico est essere una lingua lexicalmente similare allo latino et modellata nellos parametros della grammatica intri[n]seca dellas linguas romanicas et servire de lingua auxiliare intercommunicativa dellos populos parlantes de linguas romanicas modernas. Lo Latino Interromanico non pretendet essere un proto-romanico ma se le assimiliat dando una notione basica de como erat nello passato, credemus que est una lingua semi-reconstructa usando totalmente un lexico latino (que est compartito cum las linguas romanicas nativas et las linguas romanicas auxiliares constructas) et totas las desinentias possibiles dello mundo latino-romanico, lo lexico tambene est completato cum un minimo de parolas de creationes romanicas pro suplere alicunas lacunas pro facilitare la intercommunicatione assic como exiget la linguage moderna.

== Relationship with other Romance-based languages ==
Pan-Romance languages and other Romance-based languages can be similar. The later are mostly constructed a posteriori languages that resemble Romance, mainly because of their vocabulary, but lack some typical, generally grammatical, Romance features, which pan-Romance languages do include. Mediterranean Lingua Franca was not a constructed language but a pidgin.

=== Partially Romance-based constructed languages ===
There exist many constructed a posteriori languages which integrate elements from different, typically European, language families but have a very Romance or even Latin appearance because they are based on international vocabulary, that is, words which are common to the most internationally influential European languages. This vocabulary is mainly of Latin origin due to the centuries-long influence of this language over other European languages.

They have been called Latinid constructed languages by Blanke, and include Esperanto, Ido, Interlingue, Interlingua, Romániço, etc. Some are schematic, others are naturalistic constructed languages. Naturalistic Latinid languages, due to their proximity to Romance languages, have been called Neolatinid languages by Carlevaro.

Interlingua is the most notable naturalistic language of the group. The linguists at the International Auxiliary Language Association who developed the language from 1937 to 1951 based it on international vocabulary and, as a result, it has a very Latin or even Romance appearance. Nevertheless, Interlingua grammar lacks some important Romance features. Because it is intended as a global international auxiliary language, its authors (Alexander Gode and Hugh Blair) avoided what they considered unnecessary Romance complications which would be difficult to learn (or comprehend) by non Romance speakers. Thus, they developed a simple grammatical system inspired by English (a Germanic language) which is not representative of Romance. It lacks, for example, nominal agreement or verbal personal inflection, which is a common trait of the international Romance languages (Portuguese, Galician, Castilian, Judezmo, Catalan, Occitan, French, Arpitan, Lombard, Venetan, Corsican, Italian, etc.).

Similarly, Interlingue (known as Occidental until 1949) was described by its developer Edgar de Wahl as "not a Romance but a Latinesque language", because in spite of its vocabulary -which gives it "a big similarity with Romance languages"- its grammar (and mainly its syntax) are "absolutely not Romance", but based on other European languages. As a result, Occidental is "much more European, more Anglo-Germano-Slavic by spirit".

There is no clear border between pan-Romance languages and some of these Romance-based constructed languages. For example, Schild's Neolatino (see above), intended as a global international auxiliary language, includes the Greek-based preposition pri, which the developer considered practical to avoid confusions. Nevertheless, the language can be considered, according to Schild, a synthesis of the Romance languages even if this consideration is not completely adequate. It has been presented above among the pan-Romance languages, also because Campos Lima considered it a dialect of his own pan-Romance project.

Another project that lies on the border is Interlingua Romanica (see above), as it's a reform of Interlingua, which is based not only on Romance languages (Portuguese, Spanish, French and Italian) but also on English and, to a lesser extent, German and Russian.

=== Romance-based constructed languages ===
There are some constructed a posteriori languages which do not integrate elements from languages families other than Romance but are still not representative of Romance as a whole. This difference arises because, for example, they are also based on Romance creole languages, or their developers have strongly simplified or modified in other ways the Romance basis. They include Romanid, Lingua Franca Nova, Panlatino by William Agel de Mello and Romanova, among others.

==== Lingua Franca Nova ====
Lingua Franca Nova, created by C. George Boeree (1998), bases its lexicon on five major Romance languages (Portuguese, Spanish, Catalan, French and Italian) and its simple grammar on Romance creole languages. According to the main site of the project, "It is designed to seem relatively “natural” to those who are familiar with Romance languages, without being any more difficult for others to learn."

Sample text in Lingua Franca Nova:

Lingua franca nova (cortida a lfn, cual es comun pronunsiada como "elefen") es un lingua aidante internasional creada par Dr C. George Boeree e perfetida par multe suportores de la lingua. La vocabulo de elefen es fundida en franses, italian, portuges, espaniol e catalan. La gramatica es multe reduida e simil a la creoles romanica. La lingua es fonetical speleda, con 22 leteras de la alfabeta latina o la alfabeta cirilica.

==== Romanova ====
Romanova
- Language family: International auxiliary language: Romanova

Language codes
- ISO 639-3: rmv
- Glottolog: roma1338

There is no clear border between pan-Romance languages and some of these other Romance-based constructed languages. For example, Romanova lacks verbal personal inflexion, but nominal agreement is optional. As a result, it can seem a pan-Romance language when the subject of the sentences is the third person.

Sample text in Romanova:

Bono di'a, i benvenido al Projeto Romanova! Si tu pode leser esto tecsto, donse la lingua nova ce nus clama Romanova sta funsionando multo bien! Nus ave produsido esta lingua con la speransa ce todos los parladores de las linguas roma'nicas modernas podera' comunicar eficasemente entre se. La lingua nova consiste de tres mil vocablos, mas o menos, i elo fu formado di vocablos prendidos di todas las cuatro linguas roma'nicas maiores: el espaniese, el fransiese, el italiese, i el portugalese.

On the other side, George's Lingua Romana has elements of Italian and (Vulgar) Latin, but is closest to Spanish, so it's not so representative of Romance as a whole. Nevertheless, it is not a simple version of Spanish. It has been presented above among the pan-Romance languages because other pan-Romance developers have regarded the project as close and George as a forefather.

=== Latin-based constructed languages ===
Romance-based constructed languages can be also difficult to distinguish from Latin-based constructed languages, like Latino sine flexione. There are many proposals, typically intended as international auxiliary languages. An early project was Weltsprache, by A. Volk ed R. Fuchs (1883).

Sample text in Latino sine flexione:

Latino es lingua internationale in occidente de Europa ab tempore de imperio romano, per toto medio aevo, et in scientia usque ultimo seculo. Seculo vigesimo es primo que non habe lingua commune. Hodie quasi omne auctore scribe in proprio lingua nationale, id es in plure lingua neo-latino, in plure germanico, in plure slavo, in nipponico et alio. Tale multitudine de linguas in labores de interesse commune ad toto humanitate constitute magno obstaculo ad progressu.

A project that lies on the border is Latino Interromanico (see above), which is presented as a "Latin-Romance language".

== See also ==
- Vulgar Latin, the common ancestors of all Romance languages
- Latin Union, a former international organization of nations that use Romance languages
- Pan-Slavic language
- Pan-Germanic language
- Romanova, the Inter-Romance Language
