= Adalbert Baumann =

Bavarian teacher and politician

Personal details
- Born: 10 February 1870 Karlstadt am Main, Kingdom of Bavaria
- Died: 6 December 1943 (aged 73) Munich, Bavaria, Nazi Germany
- Party: Demokratisch-sozialistische Bürgerpartei München
- Other political affiliations: Nazi Party
- Profession: Teacher

Adalbert Baumann (10 February 1870 – 6 December 1943), was a German gymnasium teacher, politician, and historian. He is best known for his ideas surrounding Bavarian separatism, and for his series of Universal German languages, Wede.

== Political career ==
As a politician, Baumann is best known for his ideas surrounding the post-World War One future of Bavaria and Bavarian nationalism; Baumann supported a separation of Bavaria from the German Empire to form a new state with Austria. This was on the basis that the victorious powers of the war would better favour Bavaria in a new union state, rather than in a Prussian-dominated Germany. His ideas were brought to attention on 12 September 1919, when he gave a speech at a meeting of the German Workers' Party (which he had been a part of since 1919) in the Sterneckerbräu, which were so angrily rebuked by Adolf Hitler that Baumann left the room, while Hitler continued to argue against him. Baumann thus formed a part of Adolf Hitler's rise to power, as Hitler was recognised by Anton Drexler for his oratory skills, and was invited to join the Worker's Party.

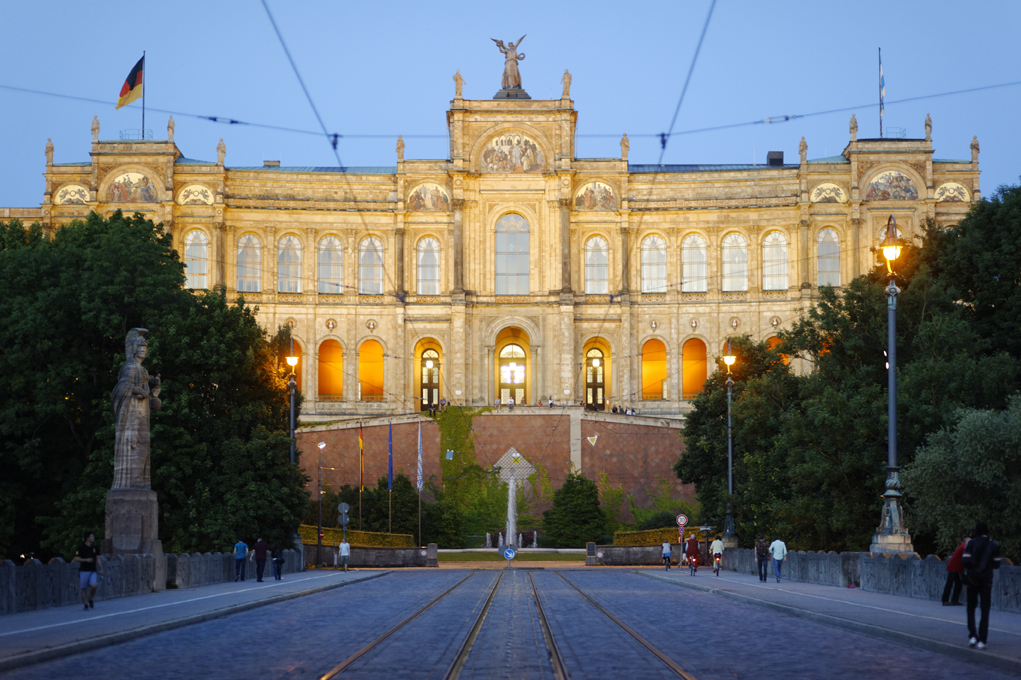
The Maximilianeum, seat of the Bavarian National Parliament, of which Baumann was a member

Baumann founded the Democratic Socialist Citizen's Party of Munich (German: Demokratisch-sozialistische Bürgerpartei München) in mid-November 1918, also joining the South Munich branch of the Independent Social Democratic Party of Germany, where he was reportedly frequently involved in clashes with fellow members, leaving the latter by 1920. Baumann was also a member of the Provisional National Council of Bavaria (the predecessor of the Landtag of Bavaria after the House of Wittelsbach was deposed in the German Revolution of 1918–1919) from 8 November 1918 to 4 January 1919.

After the formation of the Nazi Party in 1933, Baumann tried to have a German language office formed, sending a letter to Joseph Goebbels with a plea to do so. His request was denied, and Baumann would later be expelled from the Party in 1937. Baumann also supported the formation of a European economic union of 26 countries; in March 1935 a letter to the governments of Europe was sent, demanding an artificial lingua franca be installed to aid "the economic consolidation of Europe".

== Personal life ==
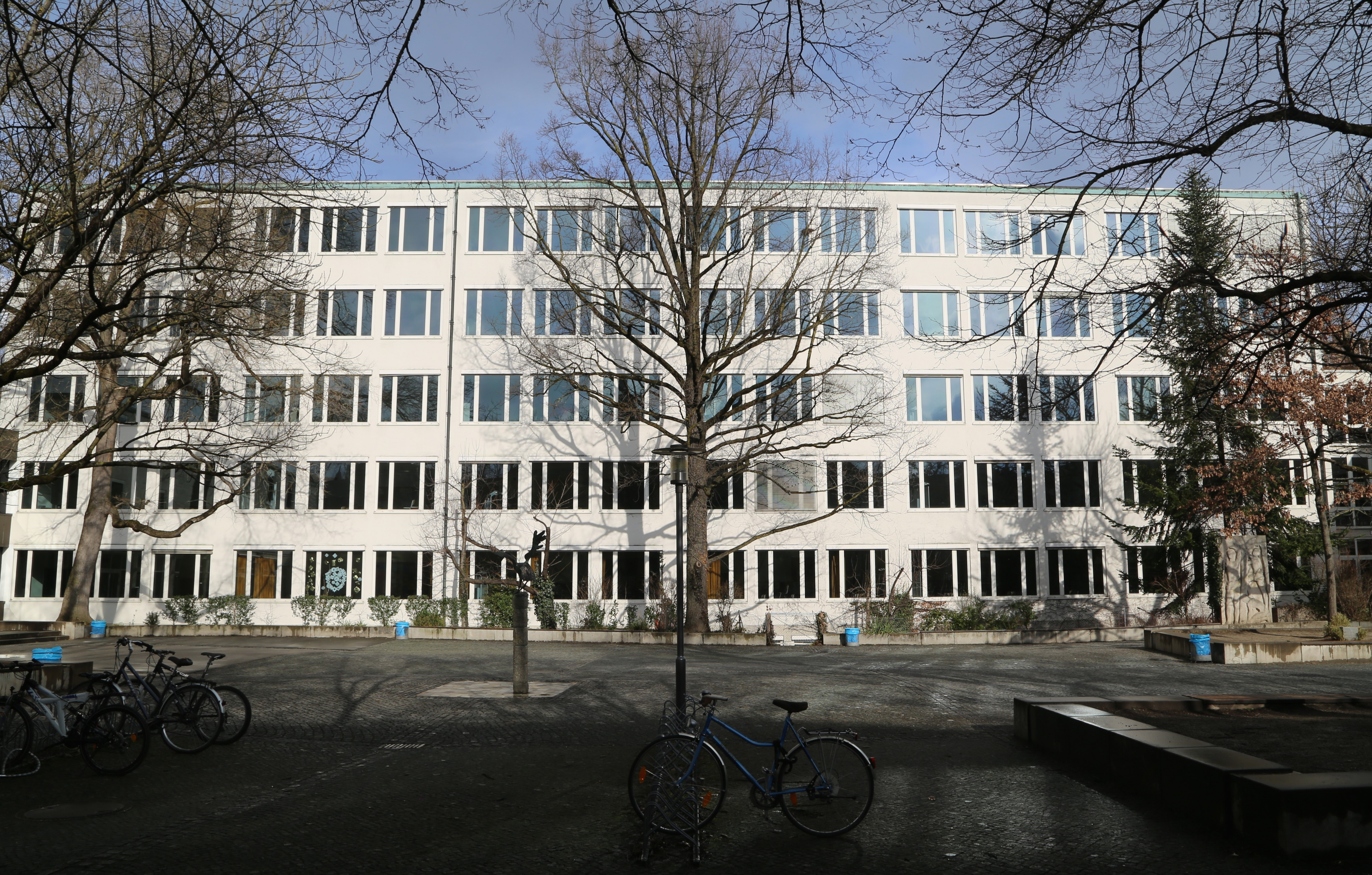
The Luitpold Gymnasium in 2018

Throughout much of his life, Baumann lived on the Neuhauser Straße in Munich. Outside of politics, Baumann was a teacher at the Luitpold Gymnasium, although some sources incorrectly label him as a professor at the Ludwig-Maximilians-Universität München.

Baumann married Emilie Schwarz (born 31 August 1873 in Heidelberg) on 15 May 1897; they were divorced in 1938. Emilie was a German Jew and was deported from Munich on 1 July 1942. She was held in the Theresienstadt Ghetto in Terezín before being murdered in the Treblinka extermination camp in Poland. Her Stolperstein is in Kaiserslautern, along with that of her sister, Olga Schwarz. Baumann died on 6 December 1943 in Munich.

== Other work ==
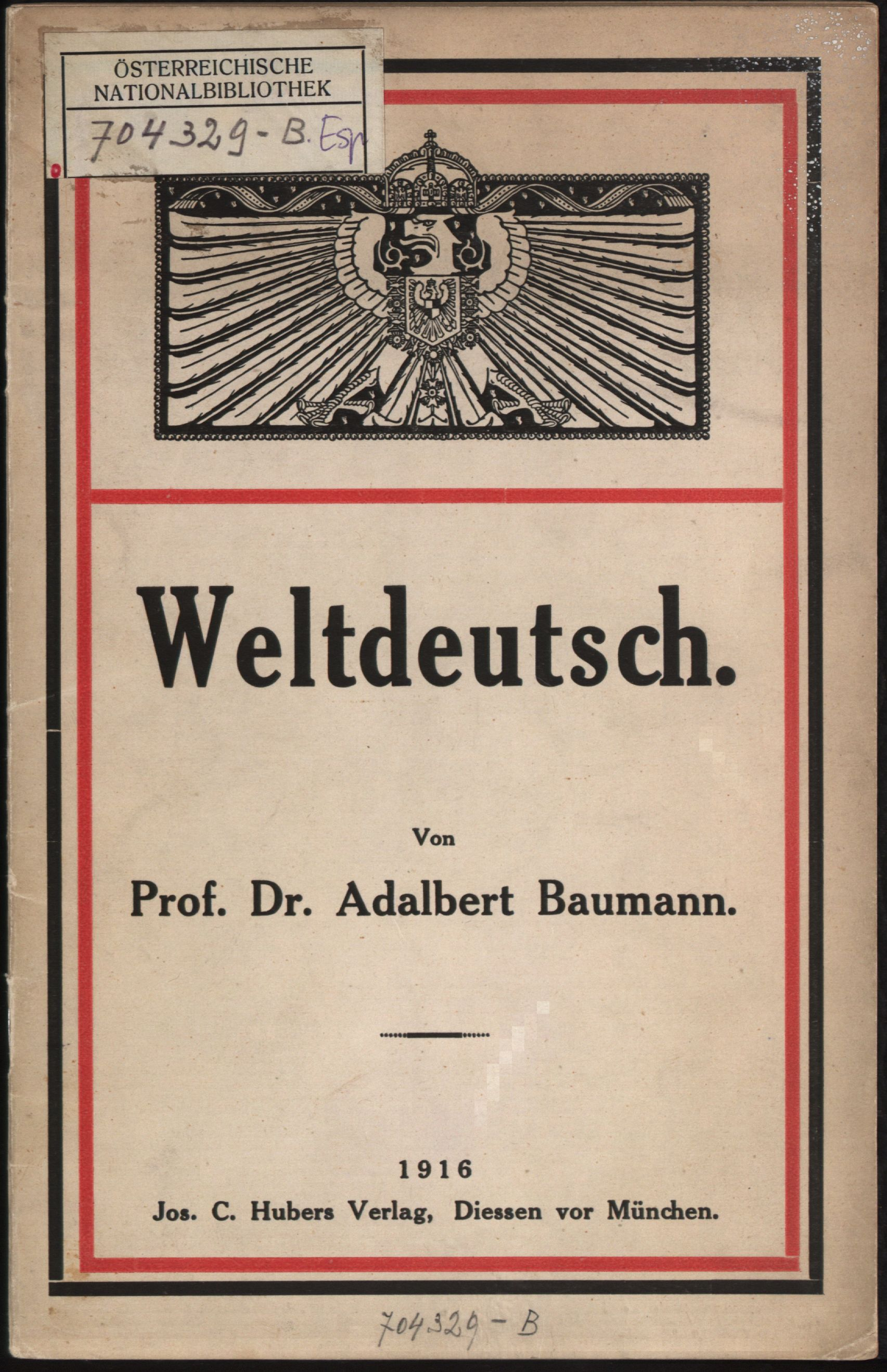
Cover of Baumann's book Weltdeutsch (das verbesserte Wedé), the second of his languages

Starting in 1915, Baumann was the author of several zonal auxiliary languages based on his native German. These included Wede, Weltdialekt, Weltpitshn, and Oiropa'pitshn, the last of which being published in 1928. These languages were created for chauvinistic purposes, specifically for the aim of implementing German as a lingua franca in post-World War One Europe. His languages included large spelling reforms, and simplifications of German grammar, designed to make German easier for foreigners to learn. Of the five languages he published, none of them came to great popularity, and received a negative reception, especially from the Esperantists and Occidentalists – Ernest Drezen once described Wede as "incomprehensible", stating that "for the Germans it is nothing a reminiscent caricature of their own mother tongue". By Oiropa'pitshn, although Baumann contacted sixty publishing houses to help release a book for the language, he was unable to publish it. Wede can also be described as a controlled natural language, since Baumann intended to limit the lexicon of the language to 2000–3000 words. Although Baumann later joined the Nazi Party, several of his languages drew large parts of their structure from Yiddish.

As a historian, Baumann published work on the history of Bavaria and Bavarian culture, publishing a book Bavarian trade in the 18th Century, especially under Elector Maximilian III Joseph: Cultural-historical Studies from Archive Sources (German: Das bayerische Handelswesen im 18. Jahrhundert, speziell unter Kurfürst Max III Josef: kulturhistorische Studien nach archivalischen Quellen) in 1898.

== Publications ==
- Baumann, Adalbert (1898). Das bayerische Handelswesen im 18. Jahrhundert, speziell unter Kurfürst Max III Josef: kulturhistorische Studien nach archivalischen Quellen (in German). A. Gotthold.
- Baumann, Adalbert (September 1915). Wede, die Verständigungsprache der Zentralmächte und ihrer Freunde, die neue Welt-Hilfs-Sprache. OCLC 186874750.
- Baumann, Adalbert (16 December 1916). Das neue, leichte Weltdeutsch (das verbesserte Wedé) für unsere Bundesgenossen und Freunde! : seine Notwendigkeit und seine wirtschaftliche Bedeutung; Vortrag, gehalten am 16. Dezember 1915 im Kaufmännischen Verein München von 1873; in laut-shrift geshriben!. Huber. OCLC 634651654.
