= Intercomprehension =

Communication using two different languages

Intercomprehension is when people try to communicate with each other using their own different languages. Intercomprehension can be explained as a dialogue between people from two different languages. Each one expresses in their own language, making efforts to understand each other.

Here we find some European methods to learn Intercomprehension. These four methods were the pioneer in this branch of linguistics and started around 2000 in different universities: Galatea, EuRom4, EuroComRom (Les sept tamis), and Understanding romance languages. All these methods focused in reading skills learning simultaneously in different Latin languages as these languages are so close in semantics, phonetics, etymology etc.

== Obstacles found within intercomprehension ==
There are a few obstacles that present themselves within intercomprehension. Effort is most noticeably influenced, as it requires both parties to exert more effort than typical in order to understand and reflect from one speaker to the other. Additionally, the extent to which dialogue is maintained is highly dependent on each party's level of motivation, physical and mental constraints, time, and linguistic ability. Mitigation strategies can be useful in navigating these obstacles, such as referring to one's L1 language(s) and their language family (Romance languages, Germanic languages, Slavic languages, etc.).

This type of communication exists for example in Scandinavian countries, where it is relatively easy to communicate between a Norwegian speaker and a Danish or Swedish speaker.

== Tandeming in intercomprehension ==
Communicating in tandem (using two languages with two speakers, each alternatively speaking their own language and that of the other) was practised in many institutions. This process represents only half of what constitutes intercomprehension — namely the moment when each person listens to or reads the other expressing themselves in their own language. With its origins in 1996, tandeming is built on the idea of teaching a language while continuing, at least half the time, to speak one's own language.

== Teaching of intercomprehension and plurilingualism ==
There is a small but significant history of teaching intercomprehension, beginning in 2000 with several projects funded by the European Union (Galatea, EuRom4, EuroComRom (Les sept tamis), and Comprendre les langues romanes). These methods ask learners to read simultaneously in many Romance languages, first developing a global comprehension strategy before entering into detail.

In 2003, the platform Galanet connected virtual teams of Romance language learners to produce an online article over the course of a university semester. Since 2009, the platform Galapro has enabled the instructional training of trainers in intercomprehension. Redinter, a European training network active between 2009 and 2011, brought together a large number of researchers and trainers, and federated the connectivist platforms Galanet and Galapro alongside the educational platforms EduRom5 and EuroComRom.

Since 2015, the platform Miridai has enabled online and group-based training, and hosts a network of international teachers and researchers specialised in intercomprehension and collaborative online work.

=== Teaching of plurilingual intercomprehension in France ===
The 2018 CEFR from the Council of Europe presents, within the realisation and amplification of its levels project, a more functional approach to plurilingual intercomprehension by deploying descriptors designed to facilitate sense-making of unknown languages and to develop a degree of familiarity for the parties involved. It involves, borrowing from Pierre Janin's formulation, understanding (reading, listening) rather than producing a language (writing, speaking).

In France, school practices of intercomprehension struggle to be implemented, with some proposals for the integration of neighbouring languages primarily within the school timetable from primary level onwards. The intercomprehension approach is progressing, but remains dependent on individual initiatives.

Faced with a still compartmentalised approach to language teaching, proposals are emerging to advocate for multilingual teaching, equipping learners in the understanding of a target language through the intercomprehension of related languages. These approaches, while present for several decades in the teaching repertoire, have struggled to find their place in the habits of teaching within a monolingual culture that welcomes foreigners through assimilation.

== Intercomprehension and the English language ==
While the use of English has become a practical tool in the international space, there are concerns that this hinders long-term stable and durable development, particularly in terms of the comfort of each native speaker. The MIME project — Mobility and Inclusion in Multilingual Europe — reports that, holistically, multiple approaches to communication (intercomprehension) are preferable to the exclusive use of a single mode of communication such as English.

== See also ==
- mutual intelligibility
