= Pan-Germanic language =

Zonal constructed language

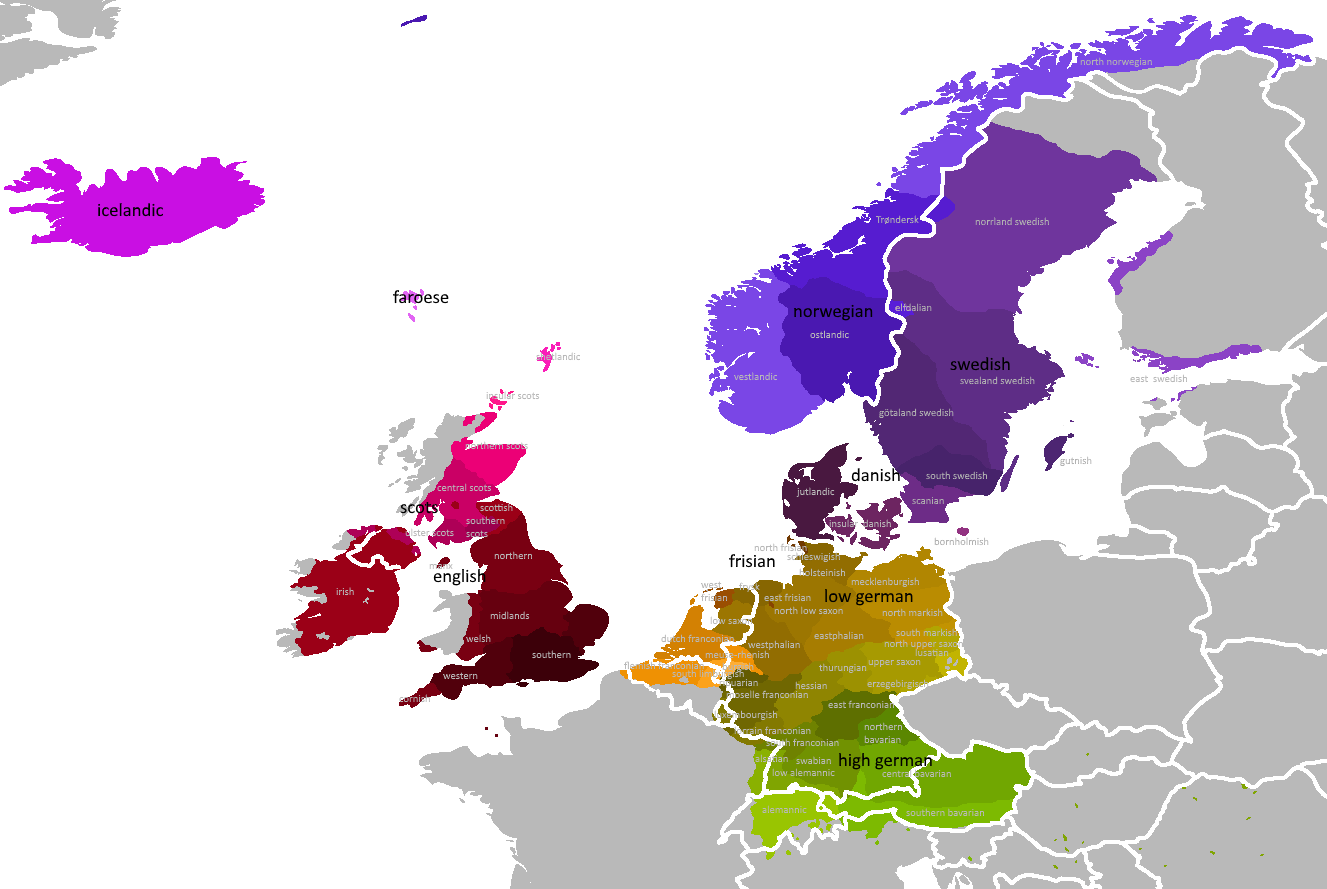
Germanic languages

A pan-Germanic language is a zonal auxiliary language designed for communication amongst speakers of Germanic languages. Many of them are very similar and overlap in their approach but they are mutually inconsistent in their orthography, phonology, and vocabulary.

== Background ==
The intention behind a zonal auxiliary language is to create a means of mutual communication among speakers of related languages. Due to the diversity and variation among Germanic dialects, the most-spoken languages—English, German, Dutch, Swedish, Danish and Norwegian—are usually given precedence over others. Some of the pan-languages focus on unifying subgroups of the Germanic languages, such as the North or West Germanic languages.

The development of each language is similar to the process for developing other auxiliary languages. To create a word or a grammatical form, samples are taken from all of the Germanic languages and the form common to most of the languages is selected. Reference is also made to previously existing and parallel Germanic zonal auxiliary languages.

== Overview ==
The first known active and concise effort to unite the Germanic languages is Tutonish. It was developed by Elias Molee in 1901, and reformed in 1906 and 1915. It was extremely simplistic. The orthography, while straightforward, was not related to any of the existing natural Germanic languages. However, despite its shortcomings, Molee established Four Principles that provided a framework for future works.

Later in the 20th and 21st centuries, other projects have been launched as well, none of which has ever been successful, though:

- In 2000, a new project was presented on the Internet by Aaron Chapman, Folksstem ("De Nue Germane Kunstsprak"). Later, it was renamed Nordien and Nordienisk.
- Folkspraak, a collaborative project or projects, was initiated on the internet in 1995. Since its inception, the project has not advanced much, and rifts in the Folkspraak community have given rise to various variants, including Middelsprake (by Ingmar Roerdinkholder, 2004), Sprak (by Stephan Schneider, 2006) and Frenkisch (by David Parke, 2008).
- Tcathan/Chathan (tcatamsck) began being made in 2007. It has influences from Dutch/Afrikaans, German, North Germanic, Modern English, Frisian, Old English, and Proto-Germanic (and to a lesser extent Scots, Low German and East Germanic).

== See also ==
- Interlingua
- Pan-Germanism
- Scandinavism
