= German grammar =

Grammar of the German language

The grammar of the German language is quite similar to that of the other Germanic languages. Although some features of German grammar, such as the formation of some of the verb forms, resemble those of English, German grammar differs from that of English in that it has, among other things, cases and gender in nouns and a strict verb-second word order in main clauses.

German has retained many of the grammatical distinctions that other Germanic languages have lost in whole or in part. There are three genders and four cases, and verbs are conjugated for person and number. Accordingly, German has more inflections than English, and uses more suffixes. For example, in comparison to the -s added to third-person singular present-tense verbs in English, most German verbs employ four different suffixes for the conjugation of present-tense verbs, namely -e for the first-person singular, -st for the informal second-person singular, -t for the third-person singular and for the informal second-person plural, and -en for the first- and third-person plural, as well as for the formal second-person singular/plural.

Owing to the gender and case distinctions, the articles have more possible forms. In addition, some prepositions combine with some of the articles (e.g. In dem ---> Im).

Numerals are similar to other Germanic languages. Unlike modern English, Swedish, Norwegian, Icelandic and Faroese, units are placed before tens as in Afrikaans, Arabic, Early Modern English, Danish, Dutch, Yiddish and Frisian, e.g. twenty-one: einundzwanzig, 'one-and-twenty'.

== Nouns ==
=== Gender ===
Students of German are often advised to learn German nouns with their accompanying definite article, as the definite article of a German noun corresponds to the gender of the noun. However, the meaning or form, especially the ending, of a noun can be used to recognize 80% of noun genders. For instance, nouns ending in the suffixes -heit, -keit, -ung, -schaft or -tät are always feminine.

== Sentence structure ==
German sentence structure is similar to other Germanic languages in its use of V2 word order.

== See also ==
- Standard German phonology

== Bibliography ==
- Durrell, Martin; Hammer, A.E. (2002). Hammer's German Grammar and Usage (Fourth ed.). McGraw-Hill. ISBN 978-0-07-139654-7.
- Hawkins, John A. (2015-07-03). A Comparative Typology of English and German: Unifying the Contrasts. Routledge. ISBN 978-1-317-41972-3.
- Wietusch, Gudrun (2006). Grundkurs Grammatik. Cornelsen. ISBN 978-3-464-61805-9
- Pahlow, Heike (2010). Deutsche Grammatik - einfach, kompakt und übersichtlich. Engelsdorfer Verlag, Leipzig. ISBN 978-3-86268-012-2
