= Tutonish =

Germanic constructed language

- Tutonish, Teutonish, Teutonik, Allteutonish, Altutonish, Alteutonik, Nu Teutonish, Niu Teutonish, Neuteutonish
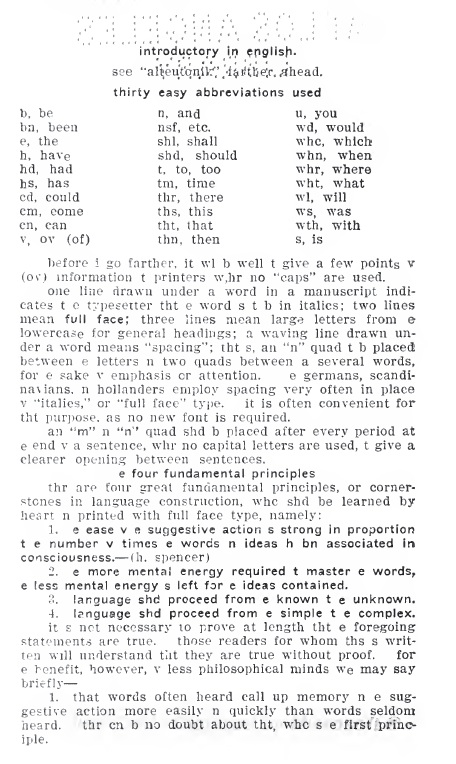
- A page from alteutonik, 1915 (a union tongue for all teutons.) (weltsprache.) by Elias Molee
- Created by: Elias Molee
- Date: 1902
- Setting and usage: Germanic peoples
- Purpose: Tutonish
- Writing system: Lowercase Latin alphabet
- Sources: English, Dutch, German and Scandinavian languages

Language codes
- ISO 639-3: qtt (local use)
- IETF: art-x-tutonish (local use)

Pupetheim = : (doll's house)

Tutonish (also called Teutonish, Teutonik, Allteutonish, Altutonish, Alteutonik, Nu Teutonish, Niu Teutonish, or Neuteutonish) is a constructed language created by Elias Molee. He worked on it for several years, and he reformed it multiple times, in 1906 under the name nu teutonish, in 1911 under the name altutonish and in 1915 under the name alteutonik. It is known to be the first Pan-Germanic language.

In creating it, Molee was clearly influenced by Giuseppe Peano but chose to create a language for people based on Germanic roots instead of Romance ones. However, he created an "inter-Romance" version of his language to be used among Romance-speaking people as well.

== The Four Fundamental Principles (Alteutonik, 1915) ==
Molee's points to several principles his work is based on.

1st principle

The ease of the suggestive action is as strong in proportion to the number of times the words and ideas have been associated in consciousness. (Herbert Spencer); All teutonic children have heard of the homogeneous words arm and bone; hence armbone would be more suggestive than the Latin heterogeneous humerus.

2nd principle

The more mental energy required to master the words, the less mental energy is left for the ideas contained.

3rd principle

Language should proceed from the known to the unknown.

4th principle

Language should proceed from the simple to the complex.

Inside his works Molee often reclaims that zonal constructed language strictly should be "selvklar" (self-explanatory) and homogeneous.

== Characteristics ==
Tutonish had a simple phonetic pronunciation, a simple grammar based on the English grammar ("Fifteen rules") and a simple orthography, without majuscule. The "Germanic" version's vocabulary was built on roots taken from English, Dutch, German and Scandinavian languages, while the "Romance" version's vocabulary was mostly built on Latin and Romance languages.

== Copyleft ==
Alteutonik, 1915, page 38, mentioned copyleft "kein ferfasero rekt"; "nur to erwana e ferfasr" (only author needs to be mentioned).

== Criticism ==
Louis Couturat and Léopold Leau wrote, in their Histoire de la langue universelle, not very enthusiastically about Tutonish:

Without criticizing the project of Monsieur Molee, he must permit as to note that he is inspired by motives absolutely opposite to human and civilization scopes of international language and to neutrality postulated in it.

== Examples ==
The Germanic version (Tutonish 1901, N(i)u Teutonish 1906, Alteutonik c. 1915) of the Lord's Prayer

vio fadr hu bi in himl; holirn be dauo nam; dauo reich kom; dauo vil be dun an erd, als it bi in himl; giv vi dis dag vio dagli bred; en fergiv vi vio shulds, als vi fergiv vio shulders; en lied vi nit inzu fersieku but frie vi fon ievl. let so bi.

The Romance version of the Lord's Prayer

Nuo padr, ki bi in siel, sanktirn bi tuo nom, tuo regnu ven, tuo vol bi fasn sur ter kom in siel; don nu hoy nuo diali pan; et pardon nu nuo debits, kom nu pardon nuo debitors; et induk nu non in tentu ma delivr nu de mal.

Numbers from one to ten (according to Alteutonik, 1915)

| 1 | 2 | 3 | 4 | 5 | 6 | 7 | 8 | 9 | 10 |
| ein | tvo | tri | fir | fem | seks | syv | ot | ni | ti |

The origins of Tutonish – e urspringe ov teutonik

elias molee, e ferfasr ov teutonik isn (war) gebärn 3a einam (januari) 1845 ov eltera, wer komen fon norvegia to 1 platz 30 kilometra fon e stad ov milwaukee ... ale nakbara havn file kinda, wer kanen nur spreka sine eigena teutonike moderspraka.

Elias Molee, the author of tutonish, was born on January 3, 1845, to parents who emigrated from Norway, in a place 30 kilometers from Milwaukee ... in the entire neighborhood there was a lot of other children who only spoke their own Germanic mother tongues.

Some sentences
dau shal not baer falsh vitnesu gegn dauo nabor. "Thou shalt not bear false witness against thy neighbor."
ein union spiek, makn up ov deuch, english, skandinavish and hollandi, for to agenfererein al tutonish folka into ein spiek mitin feivti jiera.

== See also ==
- Folkspraak

== Bibliography ==
- Molee, Elias:
  - Plea for an American Language, or Germanic-English. Chicago, 1888.
  - "Germanik English". Bristol [S.D.] Bristol news print., 1889. 64 p. 21 cm.
  - Pure Saxon English. Chicago & New York, 1890.
  - Tutonish or Anglo-German Union Tongue. Chicago, Scroll Publishing Company, 1902. 206 p., 16 cm.
  - "Nu Tutonish, an International Union Language"; Tacoma, 1906.
  - "Tutonish, an international union language", London, K. Paul, Trench, Trubner & co., ltd, 1908. 48 p. 22 cm.
  - "Tutonish, et internationalt faellessprog under angelsaksisk ledelse"; Kristiania, Tutonish forlag, i hovedkommission hos H. M. Lund [1909] 44 p. illus. 22 cm.
  - "Tutonish; a Teutonic international language", Tacoma, Washington, U. S., E. Molee [c. 1961] 9 p. illus. 15 cm.
