= Elias Molee =

American journalist, philologist and linguist

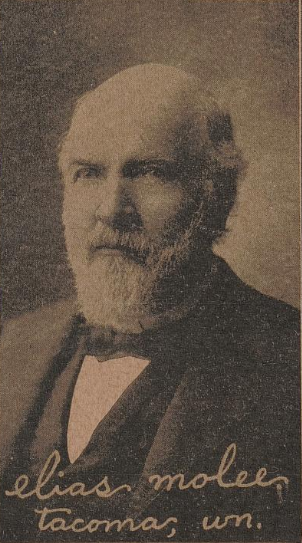
Elias Molee

Elias Molee, sometimes self-styled elias molee, (January 3, 1845 – September 27, 1928) was an American journalist, philologist and linguist. Molee was the most prolific and ambitious participant in a movement of self-styled Saxonists, who advocated the purging of borrowed words in English and replacing them with Germanic alternatives.

== Background ==
Elias Molee was born in Muskego, Wisconsin, the son of John Evenson Molie and Anne Jacobson Einong. The original spelling of the family name was Molie. His father emigrated from Tinn Municipality in the county of Telemark, Norway in 1839 and was an early farmer in Muskego.

In 1906, while publishing his second book on teutonish, he lived in Tacoma, Washington.

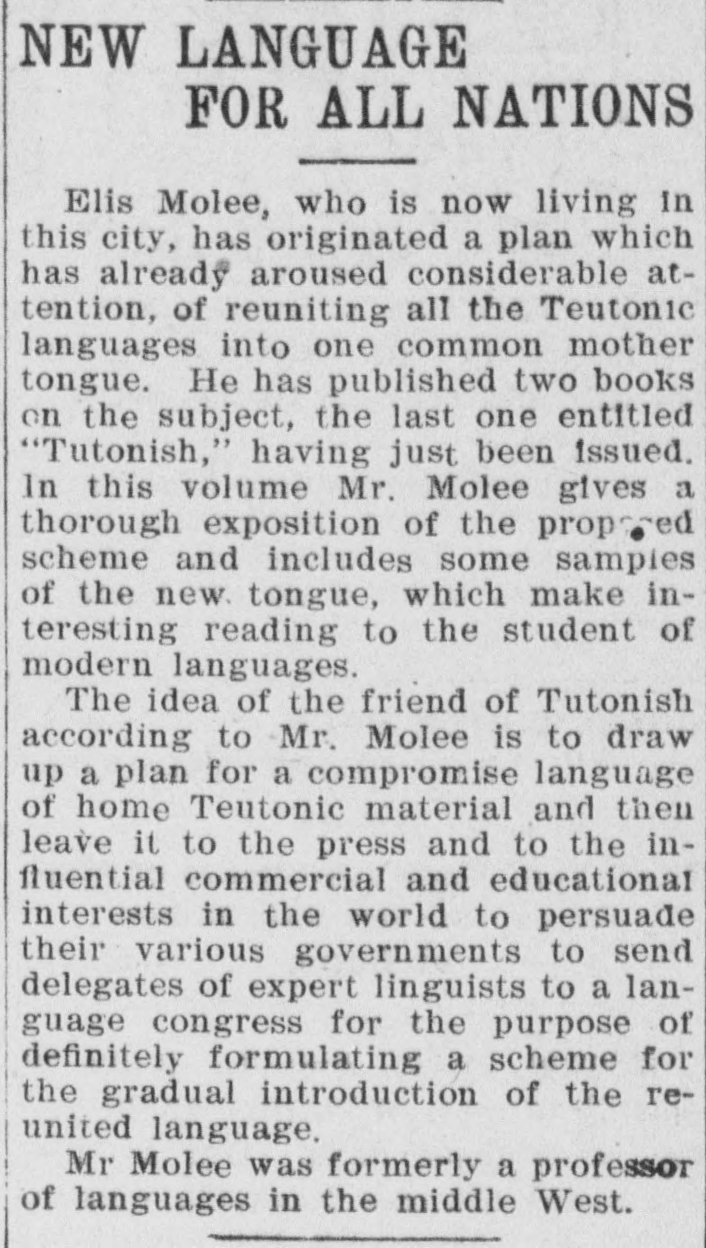
1904 article from The Tacoma Times explaining Molee's achievement

== Career ==
Elias Molee is known as the creator of the languages Amerikan and Tutonish. He also invented a system of shorthand and used only lower case letters (for example, he used "e" in place of "the") and a form of sign language symbols. In his autobiography molee's wandering (written without capital letters, which he considered "cruel, non-ethical, non-artistic, and non-scientific") he describes an idyllic childhood spent listening to tales of Norse mythology in his family's log cabin, eating "good pancakes with milk in e dough n much egg n butter in it," and roaming the fields picking fresh berries, plums and nuts with the local children.

== Plea for an American Language, or Germanic-English (1888) ==
In this book, Molee outlined the negative aspects of English and the positive aspects of more pure languages such as German, Greek, and Irish. He determined to create a new language for the American people that was a mix of all Germanic languages in the country and embodied all the best parts of these other languages. He called this language Amerikan.

=== Alphabet ===
Molee avoided diphthongs and instead preferred one letter for one sound. He created multiple custom letters for this new language, informed by his own understanding of the American aesthetic sense. The letters are numbered because Molee devised a new numbering system that was similar to that of Greek. He believed that using letters for numbers would help to solidify correct pronunciation among the people.

Vowels
number	letter	pronunciation
1	a (orig. top and bottom loop connected)	ale, nay — al, na.
2	ɑ (Latin alpha)	arm, far — ɑrm, fɑr.
3	ä (orig. no umlaut)	at, man — ät, män.
4	o	or, on, ball — bol.
5	ö	earn, word — örn, wörd.
6	ơ	oil, boy — ơl, bơ.
7	į	ice, high — įs, hį.
8	ɤ	owl, cow — ɤl, kɤ.
9	ư (orig. flag on top left)	rule, moon — rưl, mưn.
10	ɷ	old, know — ɷld, nɷ.
11	ı̣	eel, seal — ı̣l, sı̣l.
12	ü	für (see jörman and skandinavian.)
13	u	but, hut.
14	ɯ (orig. shorter middle line)	look, full — lɯk, fɯl.
15	i	it, hit, mit.
16	e	let; before "r" "e" is like "ä."

Consonants
number	letter	name	pronunciation
1	p	pı̣	pail, push — pal, pɯʃ.
2	b	bı̣	be, bought — bı̣, bot.
3	t	tı̣	tree, tight — trı̣, tįt.
4	d	dı̣	dough, down — dɷ, dɤn.
5	k	kı̣	kite, care — kįt, kär.
6	g	gı̣	go, group — gɷ, grưp.
7	f	fı̣	full, fear — fɯll, fı̣r.
8	v	vı̣	vine, verse — vįn, vörs.
9	r	rı̣	right, wring — rįt, rı̣ŋ.
10	l	lı̣	line, learn — lįn, lörn.
11	m	mı̣	moon, much — mưn, muc.
12	n	nı̣	next, nigh — nekst, nį
13	s	sı̣	soap, soup — sɷp, sưp.
14	ʃ	shı̣	ship, should — ʃip, ʃɯd.
15	z	tsı̣	zɑl, (hard as in jörm. tsɑl.)
16	j	jı̣	john, george — jon, jorj.
17	c (orig. long letter, straight line down with J connected on bottom)	chı̣	church, cheap — cörc, cı̣p
18	þ (orig. long letter, diagonal line with J connected on bottom)	thı̣	þı̣ (sı̣ iŋliʃspı̣kɑndä.)
19	ƕ (orig. "h" with small hook on top left and bottom right)	whı̣	ƕer (lörn from dı̣m iŋliʃä).
20	h	hı̣	hymn, who — him, hư.
21	w	wı̣	wound, wound — wưnd, wɤnd.
22	y	yı̣	yard, year — yɑrd, yı̣r.
23	ʮ	yoo	you, your — ʮ, ʮr
24	ŋ	äng	sing, wing — siŋ, wiŋ.

=== Nouns ===
Add -ä (pronounced like "at", "man") to words ending in a consonant. Add -s to words ending in a vowel.

Plural
Singular	Plural
män (man)	mänä (men)
hɤnd (hound)	hɤndä (hounds)
flį (fly)	flįs (flies)

Add `-ɷ` (pronounced like "owe", "know", "old") to words ending in a consonant. Add `-nɷ` to words ending in a vowel.

Possessive
Noun	Possessive
dı̣r (animal)	dı̣rɷ pläntä (animal's plants)
fadı̣ (father)	fadı̣nɷ weda (father's wife)

The plural marker always comes before the possessive.

Plural Possessive
Singular	Plural	Plural Possessive
flį (fly)	flįs (flies)	flįsɷ wingä (flies' wings)
wörd (word)	wördä (words)	wördänɷ frag (words' question)

=== Comparison ===
Add -ɑr and -ɑst (like "ah-r" and "ah-st").

=== Pronouns ===
Personal Pronouns
person	case	common	common	mas.	fem.	neut.	common
singular	Nom.	į	þɤ	hı̣	hɑ	it	ı̣r
singular	Poss.	mį	þį	hı̣n	hɑn	itɷ	ı̣rɷ
singular	Obj.	mı̣	þám	hı̣m	hɑm	itm	ı̣m
plural	Nom.	wı̣	ʮ	hı̣s	hɑs	itä	þa
plural	Poss.	ɤr	ʮr	hı̣sɷ	hɑsɷ	itän	þar
plural	Obj.	us	ʮm	hem	lem	tem	þem

Articles
case	Definite Singular	Definite Plural	Indefinite
Nom.	þı̣ (the)	dı̣ (the)	an (a or an)
Poss.	þı̣n (of the)	dı̣n (of the)	anɷ (of a)
Obj.	þı̣m (to the)	dı̣m (to the)	am (to a)

=== Verbs ===
There are eight irregular verbs: *do, is, have, may, can, will, shall* and *worth* (to become), which have been excepted on account of brevity and frequency.

Verb Forms
form	addition	example
infinitive (noun)	-än	(tä) luvän, (tä) flįän
present tense	(root)	luv, flį
past tense	-o (pronounced "dawn") after consonants, -d after vowels	luvo, flįd
present participle	-ɑnd	luvɑnd, flįɑnd
verbal noun	-ing	luving, flįing
past participle	-en (after m and n) or -n	hɑ häs luvn / givn / workn, hı̣ häs komen
imperative	-a after consonants, -ta after vowels	gɷta!, lı̣va!
optative (wishing)	-ö after consonants, -mö after vowels	givö, hı̣ gɷmö (oh that he would go!)
conjunctive	-i after consonants, -if after vowels	į luvi (if I love), ha gɷif (if she goes)
passive voice	-is, -s after past tense	hı̣ lovis (he is loved), hı̣ lovos (he was loved)

=== Word Formation ===
Suffixes
suffix	meaning	example
-ír	person that does thing	rídír (human that reads)
-l after consonant, -el after vowel	thing that does thing	rídl (thing that reads)
-í	masculine	singí (male singer)
-ɑ	feminine	singɑ (female singer)
-it	neutral	singit (singing thing)

=== Syntax ===
Negation is formed with "na" (pronounced "nay") before the verb.

== Pure Saxon English; or, Americans to the Front (1890) ==
In Pure Saxon English, Molee builds upon his Amerikan language.

1. He reduces the number of unique letters
2. Removes the numbering system based on letters in favor of cleaning up the existing English numbers
3. Changes a few suffixes

Ultimately, this book is a more conservative version of Amerikan. It is a slight compromise in the ideas in an effort to make the changes more palatable.

=== Pure Saxon English ===
==== Grammar Rules ====
1. Plurals add a after consonants, and s after vowels.
2. The possessive case adds o after consonants, and no after vowels.
3. The past tense adds o after consonants, and do after vowels.
4. The present participle adds qnd, past participle en.
5. The verbal noun adds ing, the infinitive noun qn.
6. The masculine noun adds ı̣, the feminine in.
7. To verbalize a word, add u (gladu).
8. Definite article - singular the, plural dɔ.
9. The substantive adjective takes the plural sign.
10. To form the infinitive add q.
11. Cardinals taken from the present numerals.
12. Ordinals formed by adding to cardinals tq.
13. Names of days and months - add to ordinals d or m.
14. Personal pronouns and auxiliary verbs nearly as before.
  1. Sich and mɑn (French, on) also employed.
  2. The suffix i after adjectives refers to persons in general.
15. Five irregular adjectives, and eight irregular verbs.
16. Lion, lionı̣, lionin, lionetı̣, lionetin, lionet.
17. Substantive adjectives add for sex, ı̣, in, it.
18. Adjectives from proper nouns regularly derived.
19. The personal agent adds qr, ı̣r, etc.; impersonal el.
20. The personal actor adds qr; comparative adjective er, est.

==== Example ====
Russian Wolf Story

[A very good and touching piece to speak at school exhibitions and at concerts. It should be spoken slowly and distinctly.]

Som yı̣ra ago, a Russianik qdelman (nobleman) was reisqand (traveling) on bisnes in the ineri (interior) ov Russia, hus wuda qr ful ov wolfa. It was the beginning ov winter, but the frost had seten in erli. His farein (carriage to fare in) rɔlo up tu a gesthaus (hotel), and hı̣ ferlqngo (demanded) a nuspan (relay) ov horsa to bring him tu the nekst standort (station), wher hı̣ wisho tu spend the neit. The gestkı̣per telo him that ther was gefqr (danger) in reising (traveling) so lait, as dɔ wolfa wer aut. But the qdelman thinko the gestkı̣per ɔnli wisho to kı̣p him so as tu fermɔr (increase) his rekening (bill) agenst him; hı̣ saido, therfɔr, it was tu erli for dɔ wolfa to bı̣ aut. Hı̣ then dreivo on mit his weif and cheild inseid the farein.

=== Systematic English ===
Pure Saxon English was explained as the final goal, but Systematic English was introduced as a stepping stone towards that goal; a branch of Pure Saxon English. It consists of only the first 10 grammar rules of Pure Saxon English. It does not require spelling reform.

==== Example ====
Systematic English is, therefore, ordinary English modifien by dɔ ten first rula of the Pure Saxon English grammar and could be introducen at any time without destroying immediate intelligibility. This moderate reform alone would makq English better fitten to be the international language, because more regular, more euphonious, and easier to learnq. If a mixen language must be haden as an international tongue, why would not "Systematic English" do? It is as mixen as Volapuk or Pasilingua, and it is already widely understanden, and has a strong home basis. It would not be as good for schoola and popular knowledge as a pure picturesque Saxon English, but if dɔ leadera of thought and fashion do not love a "Pure Saxon English," then the next best thing to do would be to adoptq "Systematic English." Where there is great power there are great responsibilities. While we take pride in seeing our language become international, we should not forgetq that it ought to be a good one to be worthy of that high honor, and it would be a better language for our childa.

== Other works ==
- Tutonish (1902)
- nu teutonish (1906), 129 p.
- altutonish (1911)
- alteutonik (1915)
- Dynamic Language (1921)
- Toito Spike (1923)

== Sources ==
- Elias Molle, Papers, 1911–1928. (Norwegian-American Historical Association. 15 items. P 243)
- Emigration from the Community of Tinn, 1837–1907: Demographic, Economic, and Social Background (by Andres A. Svalestuen translated by C. A. Clausen. Norwegian-American Historical Association. Volume 29, Page 43)
