= Eedes =

Eedes is a surname. Notable people with the surname include:

- John Eedes (1609?-1667?), English divine
- Richard Eedes (disambiguation)

== See also ==
- Edes (disambiguation)
