= Et tu, Brute? =

Latin phrase made famous by Shakespeare's Julius Caesar

The Shakespearean macaronic line "Et Tu Brutè?" in the First Folio from 1623

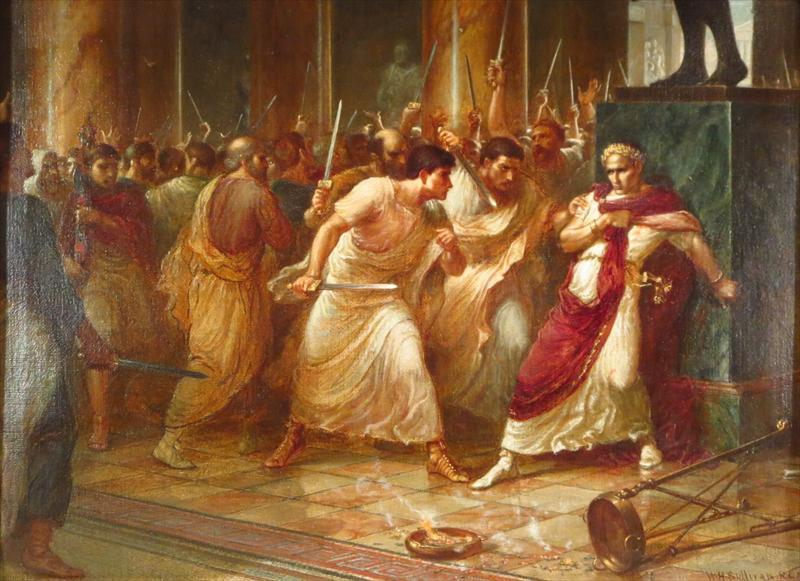
This 1888 painting by William Holmes Sullivan is named Et tu Brute and is located in the Royal Shakespeare Theatre.

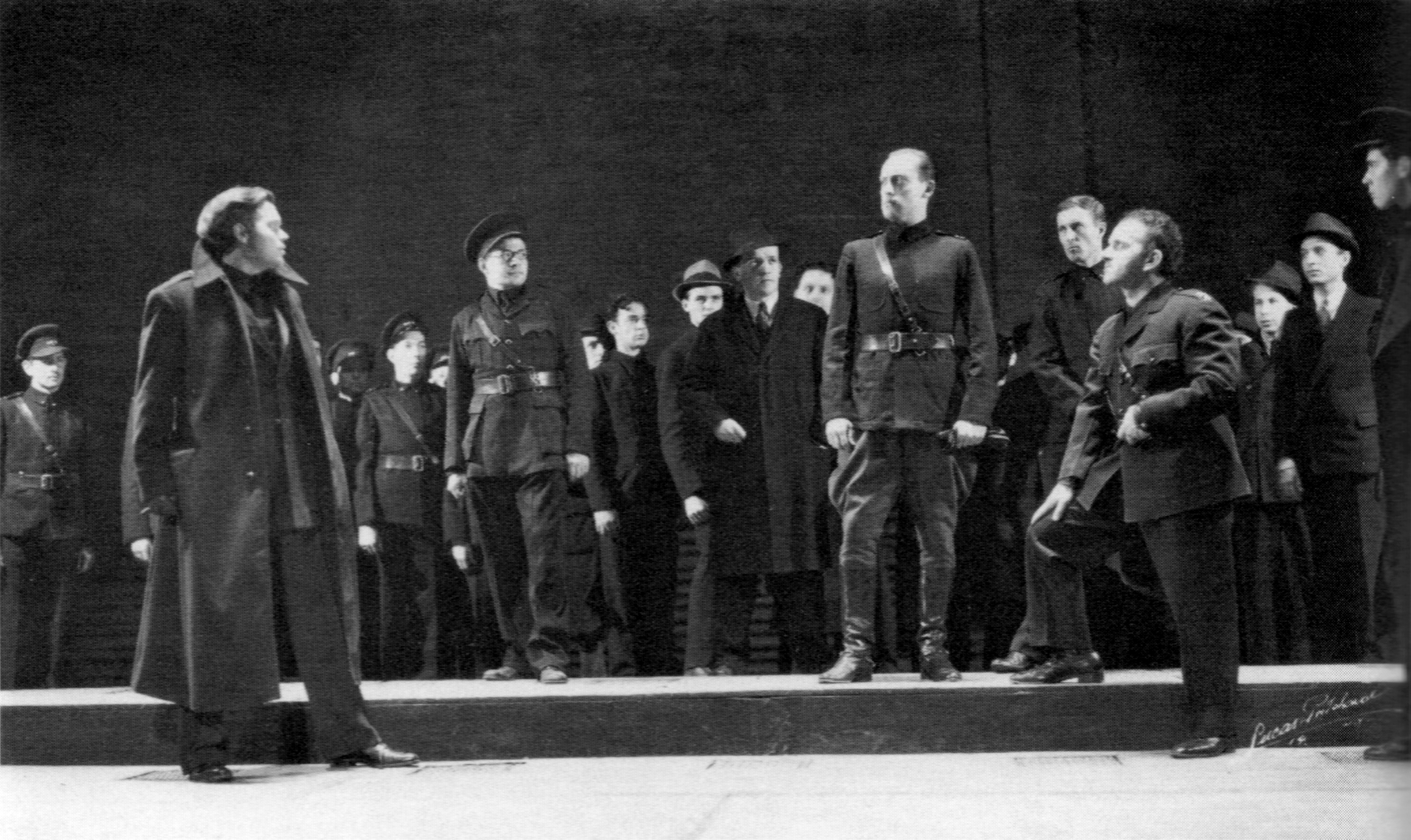
Photograph of the 1937 Mercury Theatre production of Caesar, the scene in which Julius Caesar (Joseph Holland, center) addresses the conspirators including Brutus (Orson Welles, left)

"Et tu, Brute?" (pronounced [ɛt ˈtuː ˈbruːtɛ]) is a Latin phrase literally meaning "and you, Brutus?" or "also you, Brutus?", often translated as "You, as well, Brutus?", "You, too, Brutus?", or "Even you, Brutus?". The quote appears in Act 3, Scene 1 of William Shakespeare's play Julius Caesar, where it is spoken by the Roman dictator Julius Caesar at the moment of his assassination, to his friend Marcus Junius Brutus upon recognizing him as one of the assassins. Contrary to popular belief, the words are not Caesar's last in the play, as he says "Then fall, Caesar" right after. The first known occurrences of the phrase are said to be in two earlier Elizabethan plays: Henry VI, Part 3 by Shakespeare, and an even earlier play, Caesar Interfectus, by Richard Edes. The phrase is often used apart from the plays to signify an unexpected betrayal by a friend.

There is no evidence that the historical Caesar spoke these words. Though the historical Caesar's last words are not known with certainty, the Roman historian Suetonius, a century and a half after the incident, claims Caesar said nothing as he died, but that others reported that Caesar's last words were the Greek phrase Kaì sý, téknon (Καὶ σύ, τέκνον), which means "You, too, child" or "You, too, young man" to Brutus.

== Etymology ==
The name Brutus, a second declension masculine noun, appears in the phrase in the vocative case, and so the -us ending of the nominative case is replaced by -e.

== Context ==
On March 15 (the Ides of March), 44 BC, the historic Caesar was attacked by a group of senators, including Brutus, who was Caesar's friend and protégé. Caesar initially resisted his attackers, but when he saw Brutus, he reportedly responded as he died. Suetonius mentions the quote merely as a rumor, as does Plutarch who also reports that Caesar said nothing, but merely pulled his toga over his head when he saw Brutus among the conspirators.

Caesar saying "Et tu, Brute?" in Shakespeare's play Julius Caesar (1599) was not the first time the phrase was used in a dramatic play. Edmond Malone claimed that it appeared in a work that has since been lost—Richard Edes's Latin play Caesar Interfectus of 1582. The phrase had also occurred in another play by Shakespeare, The True Tragedie of Richard Duke of Yorke, and the death of good King Henrie the Sixth, with the Whole Contention betweene the two Houses Lancaster and Yorke of 1595, which is the earliest printed version of Henry VI, Part 3.

== Interpretation ==
It has been argued that the phrase can be interpreted as a curse or warning. One theory states that the historic Caesar adapted the words of a Greek sentence which to the Romans had long since become proverbial: the complete phrase is said to have been "You, too, my son, will have a taste of power", of which Caesar only needed to invoke the opening words to foreshadow Brutus's own violent death, in response to his assassination. The poem Satires; Book I, Satire 7 by Horace, written approximately 30 BC, mentions Brutus and his tyrannicide; in discussing that poem, author John Henderson considers that the expression E-t t-u Br-u-t-e, as he hyphenates it, can be interpreted as a complaint containing a "suggestion of mimetic compulsion".

== Legacy ==
James Joyce wrote the poem titled "Et Tu, Healey" about Charles Stewart Parnell when he was nine. The poem was a reaction against Parnell's apparent betrayal by the Irish Catholic Church, the Irish Parliamentary Party, and the British Liberal Party that resulted in a collaborative failure to secure Irish Home Rule in the British Parliament. Joyce's brother, Stanislaus, describes the poem as "a diatribe against the supposed traitor, Tim Healy, who had ratted at the bidding of the Catholic bishops and become a virulent enemy of Parnell, and so the piece was an echo of those political rancours that formed the theme of my father's nightly half-drunken rantings to the accompaniment of vigorous table-thumping."

== See also ==
- List of idioms attributed to Shakespeare
