= Last words of Julius Caesar =

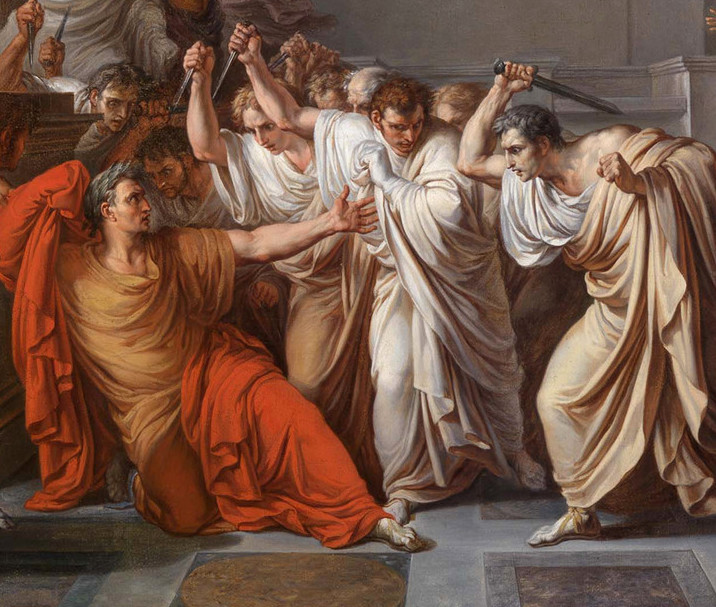
Part cropped from The Death of Julius Caesar (1806) by Vincenzo Camuccini. Caesar can be seen staring at Brutus, who is looking away from his gaze. Caesar's last words may have been directed at Brutus.

The last words of the Roman dictator Julius Caesar are disputed. Ancient chroniclers reported a variety of phrases and post-classical writers have elaborated on the phrases and their interpretation. The two most common theories – prevalent as early as the second century AD – are that he said nothing or that he said, in Greek, καὶ σύ, τέκνον (kaì sý, téknon; "you too, child").

William Shakespeare's Latin rendition of this phrase, et tu, Brute? ("You too, Brutus?"), in the play Julius Caesar, is better known in modern culture, but is not found in ancient sources.

== Possibilities ==
=== Expression of surprise towards the attack ===
During the assassination, senator Tillius Cimber grabbed hold of Caesar's toga and pulled it down from his neck, which signalled to the other conspirators that it was time to attack. According to the historian Suetonius, Caesar shouted out in Latin, "ista quidem vis est!" ("Why, this is violence!" or "But this is violence!") when his toga was ripped down from his shoulder. Suetonius further writes that Caesar spoke no more after this, besides a groan after the first knife blow, and died without saying anything.

It is suggested that this groan was more of an aggressive "spontaneous curse". Another version sometimes parroted is "What is this? Such violence against Caesar!"; (Note: Caesar was known to write and sometimes speak of himself in the third person.) this version is a twisting of Suetonius's writing and not an accurate translation of surviving texts, which seems to emphasise Caesar's ego as it implies both affront and shock that anyone would ever dare to attempt to attack him.

However, the historian Plutarch claims that Caesar cried out in Latin "Foulest Casca, what are you doing?"—alternatively translated as "Casca, you villain, what are you doing?"—after being stabbed by senator Servilius Casca, the first conspirator to do so. Plutarch does not provide the actual Latin phrase but rather reports it in Greek as "μιαρώτατε Κάσκα, τί ποιεῖς" (Miarṓtate Káska, tí poieîs?). (Note: This is due to Plutarch himself being a Greek, as well as the fact that at the time in Rome (despite being a Latin-speaking empire) Greek was the main language of literature and high art. Plutarch wrote with Roman readers in mind.) Plutarch does not give any further quotes, but he says that Caesar "cried aloud" as he fought back and tried to escape, but gave up when he saw senator Marcus Junius Brutus among the assassins.

=== Interaction with Brutus ===
Although Suetonius, Cassius Dio, and probably Plutarch as well seem to have believed Caesar died without saying anything further, the first two also reported that, according to others, Caesar had spoken the Greek phrase "καὶ σύ τέκνον" (Kaì sý, téknon - You too, child) to Brutus, as (in Suetonius) or after (in Dio) that senator struck at him.

The subject of this comment is, like in antiquity, almost universally believed to have been directed at Marcus Junius Brutus, who was the son of Caesar's favourite mistress Servilia, and was said to have been very dear to Caesar, but there has been speculation that the words may have actually been meant to be said to Decimus Junius Brutus Albinus with whom Caesar also had a very close relationship and on several occasions described as "like a son to him". Both men were rumoured at the time in Rome to be Caesar's illegitimate children. The possibility that Marcus Junius Brutus, however, was Caesar's son was viewed sceptically by ancient historians and broadly rejected by modern ones.

While téknon is often translated as "son", the word is gender-neutral and is more literally "child" or "offspring". The intended message of the term has also been interpreted as endearment, or an insult, and as a claim of actual paternity, though historians believe this is unlikely. The phrase's status as a question has been debated. It has been argued that the phrase can be interpreted as a curse or warning instead, along the lines of "you too will die like this" or "may the same thing happen to you"; Brutus later stabbed himself to death, or rather threw himself onto a blade held by an attendant. One hypothesis states that the historic Caesar adapted the words of a Greek sentence which to the Romans had long since become proverbial: the complete phrase is said to have been "You too, my son, will have a taste of power", of which Caesar only needed to invoke the opening words to foreshadow Brutus' own violent death, in response to his assassination.

This phrase is thought to have inspired the more famous wording "et tu, Brute?", which was used by Richard Edes in his play Caesar Interfectus, which later likely inspired William Shakespeare for his Caesar play. While "Et tu, Brute?" is the best known Latin version of the phrase in the English-speaking world due to Shakespeare, another well-known version in continental Europe is "Tu quoque, fili mi?" (or "mi fili?" with the same meaning), which is a more direct translation from the Greek.

== Likelihood ==
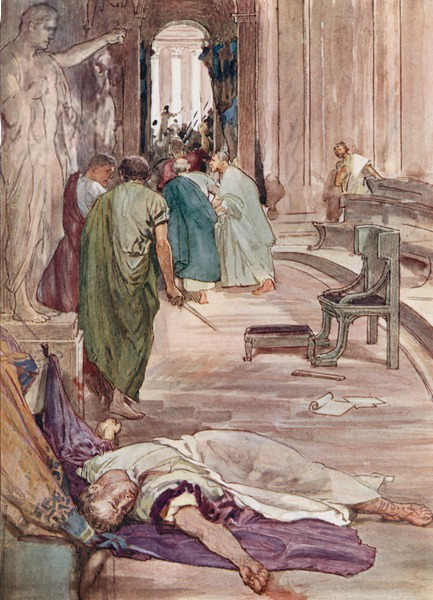
L'assassinio di Cesare by William Rainey

There has existed discourse over the likelihood of Caesar being able to say much after being stabbed, let alone something very personal and profound to Brutus, considering his age and the stress forced on him during the ordeal. The ancient historian Cassius Dio says that Caesar did not and in fact could not say or do anything, because he was mobbed. Historical biographer Stephen Spignesi on the other hand states in his book In the Crosshairs: Famous Assassinations and Attempts from Julius Caesar to John Lennon that he believes it makes sense that Caesar would at least have said something during his final moments rather than staying silent. He also states that in his opinion Caesar using the terms "child" or "son" would be in character for the man, partly as Caesar had been a longtime partner of Brutus' mother and partly because it is diminutive.

Åke Persson of Språktidningen (Swedish: The Language Magazine) expresses that there was already an expectation in ancient times that Caesar would have said something. This being due to people having a hard time accepting that a man such as him, a great spokesman and larger than life personality, would leave no final words to be remembered.

In 2014, The History Channel released a short documentary titled Coroner Report: Julius Caesar as part of their Coroner's Report series which examined if it was likely that Caesar was able to say anything at all while his attack was ongoing. The doctor postulates in the film that considering the injuries Caesar received, 23 stab wounds with the single one in the side of the chest being the only fatal one, that it is likely that he lingered on alive for a long time, possibly hours and could have very well spoken to some extent during that time. He adds that it would also depend on the exact cause of death, depending on if he died of a collapsed lung or internal bleeding, with the bleeding being more likely to leave him able to speak for longer. Since most of the cuts were inflicted one and one after another, not simultaneously (and especially since his autopsy stated that 22 out of the gashes were superficial) his body would have withdrawn blood from periphery places to try to ensure that the vital organs survived (such as brain, lungs and liver), resulting in a slow, adrenaline-filled and most importantly conscious demise.

== In popular culture ==
The phrase "et tu, Brute?" which was used by William Shakespeare in his famous play Julius Caesar as part of Caesar's death scene has become synonymous with betrayal in modern times due to the play's popularity and influence; this has led to the popular belief that the words were Caesar's last words, but in the play itself the words are not Caesar's last, as he exclaims "Then fall, Caesar" afterwards before he finally dies. Despite this the words have become popularly used as his last words in media which adapts Caesar's life or that period in time. There have been a few notable exceptions to this, such as the video game Assassin's Creed: Origins which in English uses the words "You too, my child?", taken from the Greek "Kaì sú, téknon", while the French dub of the game, instead of simply translating it to French, decided to use the continental Latin translation "Tu quoque mi fili?" (You too, my son?).

In the 1964 British comedy film Carry On Cleo, before being assassinated Caesar declares: "Infamy, infamy, they've all got it in for me". In 2007, the line was voted the best one-liner in a Sky Movies poll of 1,000 film fans.

== See also ==
- List of last words
