= Edes =

Edes is a surname. It may refer to:

- Benjamin Edes (1732–1803), American journalist and political agitator
- Elmer Edes (1937–2014), American handball player
- Gordon Edes (born 1954), American sportswriter
- Richard Edes (1555–1604), English churchman
- William C. Edes (1856-1922), American civil engineer

== Other uses ==
- National Republican Greek League, a Greek World War II resistance group

== See also ==
- Ede (disambiguation)
- Eedes
