= Old Church Slavonic grammar =

Grammar of the Old Church Slavonic language

Old Church Slavonic is an inflectional language with moderately complex verbal and nominal systems.

== Nouns ==
The nominal case category distinguishes 7 cases for nouns, 6 for pronouns and adjectives (no vocative):

Nominal cases
Abbr.	Case
N	Nominative
G	Genitive
D	Dative
A	Accusative
V	Vocative
L	Locative
I	Instrumental

=== Noun syntax ===
==== Number ====
Old Church Slavonic has three numbers: singular, dual, and plural.

The dual, and not the plural, is used for nouns that are two. Nouns found in natural pairs, such as eyes, ears, and hands, are only found rarely in the plural. Due to its consistent use in all Old Church Slavonic texts, it appears to have been a living element of the language. The dual affects adjectives and verbs in addition to nouns.

==== Nominative case ====
The nominative is used for the subject of a sentence, but it is only distinguished from the accusative in the masculine plural and the feminine singular, excluding the i-declension. Unlike in most modern Slavic languages, the nominative is also typically used for the complement of verbs meaning "to be". It is also used with verbs of naming and calling, but the accusative is also used for these verbs.

==== Accusative case ====
The accusative case is used for the direct object of a sentence with transitive verbs. For the masculine o/jo declension, the accusative singular for "an adult, healthy, free male person" is often shown by the use of the endings of the genitive singular. The accusative is also used with nouns for a duration of time and a measure of distance. Old Church Slavonic makes more frequent use of the accusative case after negated infinitives and participles than other Slavic languages, and it is unclear if this is an innovation of Old Church Slavonic or an archaism.

==== Genitive case ====
When used with nouns, the genitive frequently denotes the possessor of another noun or "the whole of which the other noun is a part", among other meanings. It is also used frequently with the numerals after five, and with certain pronouns, in the form of the partitive genitive.

The genitive may be used as the complement of the 'verb to' to denote possession, and it replaces the nominative as the complement of 'to be' in impersonal sentences if the verb is negated. It is also used for the object of negated infinitives or participles, and for the objects of certain verbs. It is used after some adjectives, and for objects of comparison after adjectives in the comparative. When recording a date, the month is typically written in the genitive. Unlike other Slavic languages, there is no genitive of time. Some scholar hypothesize that some morphemes conveying this case originated form a merger with the old Indoeuropean ablative.

==== Dative case ====
The dative case is used for the indirect object of a sentence. In addition, it is infrequently used to denote the goal of a motion (its original meaning), but this is more typically shown by using the preposition къ (kъ) followed by the dative. It is also used for the objects of verbs of commanding, obeying, favoring, giving, saying, showing, and promising, as well as for verbs meaning "to seem", and "to be similar to". Additionally, it can be used with nouns and adjectives, particularly in impersonal constructions. It can also be used for a "dative of advantage", showing for whom an action was performed, and as an "ethic dative" that shows "emphasis or emotional involvement". Moreover, the dative can also be used to show possession, typically showing a close relationship between the possessor and the thing possessed, in which form it can occur after the verb "to be" or adjoining the noun possessed. The dative is also used for the "dative absolute" construction, a type of subordinate clause, in which a participle, often with a noun subject, are both placed in the dative.

==== Instrumental case ====
The instrumental case can show the "instrument" by which an action was performed, mark "a part of the body or state of mind accompanying the action", and denote the manner in which something was performed. The instrumental can be used to denote measure following a comparison, how many times an action was performed with numerals, an instrumental of place showing over or through what a movement occurs, to denote the time of an action, to mean "in respect to" when use with verbs, adjectives, or other nouns, and to denote the cause of verb, among other meanings. It is also used to denote the agent in passive constructions.

The instrumental is also found rarely for the complement of the verb "to be". It is not found in this meaning in the oldest Old Church Slavonic texts, the Gospels, and only occasionally in later texts.

==== Locative case ====
The locative case is used to denote the location in which something occurs. It very rarely occurs without a preceding preposition. Without a preposition, it is only used with place names, as a "locative of place". Due to more frequent use of locatives of place in Old Russian and Old Czech, it is possible that this rarity is caused by Old Church Slavonic following Greek syntax. It is also used, again rarely, for the "locative of time" to denote "in" a certain time. The locative is also used as the object of a small number of verbs; as this construction is extremely rare in other Slavic languages it is most likely an archaic form.

==== Vocative case ====
The vocative is used instead of the nominative when a noun is used in isolation as an address or exclamation. Due to this case's consistent use in translations from Greek, in which the vocative is often identical to the nominative, it is clear that it was productive part of the spoken language.

=== o-stems ===
Masculine gender ("town")
–	Singular	Dual	Plural
N	град-ъ grad-ъ	град-а grad-a	град-и grad-i
G	град-а grad-a	град-ꙋ grad-u	град-ъ grad-ъ
D	град-ꙋ grad-u	град-ома grad-oma	град-омъ grad-omъ
A	град-ъ grad-ъ	град-а grad-a	град-ꙑ grad-y
V	град-є grad-e	град-а grad-a	град-и grad-i
L	град-ѣ grad-ě	град-ꙋ grad-u	град-ѣхъ grad-ěxъ
I	град-омь grad-omь	град-ома grad-oma	град-ꙑ grad-y

Nouns belonging to this declension class are generally masculines ending in -ъ in the nominative singular (богъ, градъ, родъ). The only exception are the nouns in -ъ that inflect as u-stem masculines.

Sometimes (but not yet obligatorily, in contrast to later Slavic languages), in the accusative singular, the beginnings of a difference between an animate and inanimate subgender can be seen, as the genitive may occasionally be used instead of the accusative for animate objects (raba beside rabъ).

Nouns with the suffix анинъ/ꙗнинъ (-(j)an-in-ъ), for example гражданинъ, also belong to this declension class in the singular, but in the plural they lose the -in- suffix and conform to the consonantal paradigm (гражданє graždane, гражданъ graždanъ, гражданьмъ graždanьmъ, гражданꙑ graždany, гражданє graždane, гражданьхъ graždanьxъ, гражданꙑ graždany).

Neuter gender ("wine")
–	Singular	Dual	Plural
N	вин-о vin-o	вин-ѣ vin-ě	вин-а vin-a
G	вин-а vin-a	вин-ꙋ vin-u	вин-ъ vin-ъ
D	вин-ꙋ vin-u	вин-ома vin-oma	вин-омъ vin-omъ
A	вин-о vin-o	вин-ѣ vin-ě	вин-а vin-a
V	вин-о vin-o	вин-ѣ vin-ě	вин-а vin-a
L	вин-ѣ vin-ě	вин-ꙋ vin-u	вин-ѣхъ vin-ěxъ
I	вин-омь vin-omь	вин-ома vin-oma	вин-ꙑ vin-y

Nouns belonging to this declension class are neuters ending in -o in the nominative singular (сєло, лѣто, мѣсто). The only exception are the few neuters that are inflected as s-stems.

=== jo-stems ===
Masculine gender ("knife")
–	Singular	Dual	Plural
N	нож-ь nož-ь	нож-а nož-a	нож-и nož-i
G	нож-а nož-a	нож-ꙋ/нож-ю nož-(j)u	нож-ь nož-ь
D	нож-ꙋ/нож-ю nož-(j)u	нож-єма nož-ema	нож-ємъ nož-emъ
A	нож-ь nož-ь	нож-а nož-a	нож-ѧ nož-ę
V	нож-ꙋ/нож-ю nož-(j)u	нож-а nož-a	нож-и nož-i
L	нож-и nož-i	нож-ꙋ/нож-ю nož-(j)u	нож-ихъ nož-ixъ
I	нож-ємъ nož-emь	нож-єма nož-ema	нож-и nož-i

Nouns belonging to this declension class are masculines ending in -ь preceded by a palatal in the nominative singular (врачь, крал҄ь, кошь).

This paradigm encompasses nouns such as краи (krai) that don't appear to be ending in a palatal, but are in fact underlyingly combinations like krajь and so undergo this declension (*край-ь kraj-ь, краꙗ kraj-a).

Nouns ending in agentive suffixes -tel-ь and -ar-ь also belong to this class (ꙋчитєл҄ь: učitelь, učitelja, učitelju..., мꙑтарь: mytarь, mytarja, mytarju...).

Neuter gender ("sea")
–	Singular	Dual	Plural
N	мор҄-є mor-e	мор҄-и mor-i	мор҄-а mor-a
G	мор҄-а mor-a	мор҄-ꙋ mor-u	мор҄-ь mor-ь
D	мор҄-ꙋ mor-u	мор҄-єма mor-ema	мор҄-ємъ mor-emъ
A	мор҄-є mor-e	мор҄-и mor-i	мор҄-а mor-a
V	мор҄-є mor-e	мор҄-и mor-i	мор҄-а mor-a
L	мор҄-и mor-i	мор҄-ꙋ mor-u	мор҄-ихъ mor-ixъ
I	мор҄-ємъ mor-emь	мор҄-єма mor-ema	мор҄-и mor-i

The jo-stem declension class encompasses neuters ending in -e (ложє, полѥ, молєньє).

=== a-stems ===
Feminine gender ("hand/arm")
–	Singular	Dual	Plural
N	рѫк-а rǫk-a	рѫц-ѣ rǫc-ě	рѫк-ꙑ rǫk-y
G	рѫк-ꙑ rǫk-y	рѫк-ꙋ rǫk-u	рѫк-ъ rǫk-ъ
D	рѫц-ѣ rǫc-ě	рѫк-ама rǫk-ama	рѫк-амъ rǫk-amъ
A	рѫк-ѫ rǫk-ǫ	рѫц-ѣ rǫc-ě	рѫк-ꙑ rǫk-y
V	рѫк-о rǫk-o	рѫц-ѣ rǫc-ě	рѫк-ꙑ rǫk-y
L	рѫц-ѣ rǫc-ě	рѫк-ꙋ rǫk-u	рѫк-ахъ rǫk-axъ
I	рѫк-оѭ rǫk-ojǫ	рѫк-ама rǫk-ama	рѫк-ами rǫk-ami

Nouns belonging to this declension class are feminines ending in -a preceded by a hard, non-palatal consonant (жєна).

Also belonging to this paradigm are the rare masculines ending in -a (слꙋга, воѥвода).

=== ja-stems ===
Feminine gender ("soul")
–	Singular	Dual	Plural
N	дꙋш-а duš-a	дꙋш-и duš-i	дꙋш-ѧ duš-ę
G	дꙋш-ѧ duš-ę	дꙋш-ꙋ duš-u	дꙋш-ь duš-ь
D	дꙋш-и duš-i	дꙋш-ама duš-ama	дꙋш-амъ duš-amъ
A	дꙋш-ѫ duš-ǫ	дꙋш-и duš-i	дꙋш-ѧ duš-ę
V	дꙋш-є duš-e	дꙋш-и duš-i	дꙋш-ѧ duš-ę
L	дꙋш-и duš-i	дꙋш-ꙋ duš-u	дꙋш-ахъ duš-axъ
I	дꙋш-єѭ duš-ejǫ	дꙋш-ама duš-ama	дꙋш-ами duš-ami

Noun belonging to this declension class are feminines ending in -a preceded by a soft, palatal consonant (стража, свѣща, мрєжа).

It includes the ī-stem subclass, which includes both feminines (рабꙑн҄и, богꙑн҄и) and masculines (сѫдии, балии) ending in -i. Other than in the nominative singular, they do not differ from other ja-stems.

This paradigm also encompasses feminines ending in -ica (дѣвица) and -ьni- (риꙁьница), and also masculines ending in -a preceded by a palatal (юноша).

=== i-stems ===
Masculine gender ("guest")
–	Singular	Dual	Plural
N	гост-ь gost-ь	гост-и gost-i	гост-ьѥ/гост-иѥ gost-ьje
G	гост-и gost-i	гост-ью/гост-ию gost-ьju	гост-ьи/гост-ии gost-ьi
D	гост-и gost-i	гост-ьма gost-ьma	гост-ьмъ gost-ьmъ
A	гост-ь gost-ь	гост-и gost-i	гост-и gost-i
V	гост-и gost-i	гост-и gost-i	гост-ьѥ/гост-иѥ gost-ьje
L	гост-и gost-i	гост-ью/гост-ию gost-ьju	гост-ьхъ gost-ьxъ
I	гост-ьмь gost-ьmь	гост-ьма gost-ьma	гост-ьми gost-ьmi

Nouns belonging to this declension class are masculines ending in -ь preceded by a hard, non-palatal consonant (чрьвь, господь, пѫть). The only exception are a limited number of such nouns belonging to the n-stem paradigm.

Feminine gender ("bone")
–	Singular	Dual	Plural
N	кост-ь kost-ь	кост-и kost-i	кост-и kost-i
G	кост-и kost-i	кост-ью/кост-ию kost-ьju	кост-ьи/кост-ии kost-ьi
D	кост-и kost-i	кост-ьма kost-ьma	кост-ьмъ kost-ьmъ
A	кост-ь kost-ь	кост-и kost-i	кост-и kost-i
V	кост-и kost-i	кост-и kost-i	кост-и kost-i
L	кост-и kost-i	кост-ью/кост-ию kost-ьju	кост-ьхъ kost-ьxъ
I	кост-ьѭ/кост-иѭ kost-ьjǫ	кост-ьма kost-ьma	кост-ьми kost-ьmi

Nouns belonging to the i-stem feminine declension are feminines ending in -ь in the nominative singular (рѣчь, нощь, тварь).

The only exception is the noun кръвь (krъvь) which undergoes ъv-stem (ū-stem) declension.

=== u-stems ===
Masculine gender ("house")
–	Singular	Dual	Plural
N	дом-ъ dom-ъ	дом-ꙑ dom-y	дом-овє dom-ove
G	дом-ꙋ dom-u	дом-овꙋ dom-ovu	дом-овъ dom-ovъ
D	дом-ови dom-ovi	дом-ъма dom-ъma	дом-ъмъ dom-ъmъ
A	дом-ъ dom-ъ	дом-ꙑ dom-y	дом-ꙑ dom-y
V	дом-ꙋ dom-u	дом-ꙑ dom-y	дом-овє dom-ove
L	дом-ꙋ dom-u	дом-овꙋ dom-ovu	дом-ъхъ dom-ъxъ
I	дом-ъмь dom-ъmь	дом-ъма dom-ъma	дом-ъми dom-ъmi

Nouns belonging to this declension are a rather small group of masculines: чинъ, домъ, лєдъ, мєдъ, миръ, полъ, санъ, сꙑнъ, волъ, врьхъ.

=== ū-stems ===
Feminine gender
–	Singular	Dual	Plural
N	тꙑк-ꙑ tyk-y	тꙑкъв-и tykъv-i	тꙑкъв-и tykъv-i
G	тꙑкъв-є tykъv-e	тꙑкъв-ꙋ tykъv-u	тꙑкъв-ъ tykъv-ъ
D	тꙑкъв-и tykъv-i	тꙑкъв-ама tykъv-ama	тꙑкъв-амъ tykъv-amъ
A	тꙑкъв-ь tykъv-ь	тꙑкъв-и tykъv-i	тꙑкъв-и tykъv-i
V	тꙑк-ꙑ tyk-y	тꙑкъв-и tykъv-i	тꙑкъв-и tykъv-i
L	тꙑкъв-є tykъv-e	тꙑкъв-ꙋ tykъv-u	тꙑкъв-ахъ tykъv-axъ
I	тꙑкъв-ью/тꙑкв-ию tykъv-ьjǫ	тꙑкъв-ама tykъv-ama	тꙑкъв-ами tykъv-ami

Nouns belonging to the ū-stem declension (also known as -ъv-' declension, or v-stem declension) are: бꙋкꙑ, брадꙑ, цѣлꙑ, црькꙑ, хорѫгꙑ, локꙑ, любꙑ, нєплодꙑ, рабꙑн҄и, прѣлюбꙑ, смокꙑ, свєкрꙑ, жрьнꙑ, крꙑ (this last form is attested in Psalterium Sinaiticum; older sources list the accusative form кръвь as a lemma).

=== n-stems ===
Masculine gender ("stone")
–	Singular	Dual	Plural
N	кам-ꙑ kam-y	камєн-и kamen-i	камєн-є kamen-e
G	камєн-є kamen-e	камєн-ꙋ kamen-u	камєн-ъ kamen-ъ
D	камєн-и kamen-i	камєн-ьма kamen-ьma	камєн-ьмъ kamen-ьmъ
A	камєн-ь kamen-ь	камєн-и kamen-i	камєн-и kamen-i
V	кам-ꙑ kam-y	камєн-и kamen-i	камєн-є kamen-e
L	камєн-є kamen-e	камєн-ꙋ kamen-u	камєн-ьхъ kamen-ьxъ
I	камєн-ьмь kamen-ьmь	камєн-ьма kamen-ьma	камєн-ьми kamen-ьmi

Nouns belonging to this declension class are the following masculines: дьнь, ѥлꙑ, ѩчьмꙑ, камꙑ, корꙑ, пламꙑ, рємꙑ, сѧжєнь, стєпєнь.

Neuter gender ("tribe")
–	Singular	Dual	Plural
N	плєм-ѧ plem-ę	плємєн-ѣ/плємєн-и plemen-i	плємєн-а plemen-a
G	плємєн-ѣ plemen-e	плємєн-ꙋ plemen-u	плємєн-ъ plemen-ъ
D	плємєн-и plemen-i	плємєн-ьма plemen-ьma	плємєн-ьмъ plemen-ьmъ
A	плєм-ѧ plem-ę	плємєн-ѣ/плємєн-и plemen-i	плємєн-а plemen-a
V	плєм-ѧ plem-ę	плємєн-ѣ/плємєн-и plemen-i	плємєн-а plemen-a
L	плємєн-є plemen-e	плємєн-ꙋ plemen-u	плємєн-ьхъ plemen-ьxъ
I	плємєн-ьмь plemen-ьmь	плємєн-ьма plemen-ьma	плємєн-ꙋ plemen-y

Nouns belonging to this declension class are the following neuters: брѣмѧ, чисмѧ, имѧ, писмѧ, плємѧ, сѣмѧ, слѣмѧ, тѣмѧ, врѣмѧ.

=== s-stems ===
Neuter gender ("sky/heaven")
–	Singular	Dual	Plural
N	нєб-о neb-o	нєбєс-ѣ nebes-ě	нєбєс-а nebes-a
G	нєбєс-є nebes-e	нєбєс-ꙋ nebes-u	нєбєс-ъ nebes-ъ
D	нєбєс-и nebes-i	нєбєс-ьма nebes-ьma	нєбєс-ьмъ nebes-ьmъ
A	нєб-о neb-o	нєбєс-ѣ nebes-ě	нєбєс-а nebes-a
V	нєб-о neb-o	нєбєс-ѣ nebes-ě	нєбєс-а nebes-a
L	нєбєс-є nebes-e	нєбєс-ꙋ nebes-u	нєбєс-ьхъ nebes-ьxъ
I	нєбєс-ьмь nebes-ьmь	нєбєс-ьма nebes-ьma	нєбєс-ꙋ nebes-y

Nouns belonging to this declension class are the following neuters: чꙋдо, диво, дрѣво, коло, нєбо, тѣло, слово, as well as the dual forms of ꙋхо, око.

=== t-stems ===
Neuter gender ("calf")
–	Singular	Dual	Plural
N	тєл-ѧ tel-ę	тєлѧт-ѣ telęt-ě	тєлѧт-а telęt-a
G	тєлѧт-є telęt-e	тєлѧт-ꙋ telęt-u	тєлѧт-ъ telęt-ъ
D	тєлѧт-и telęt-i	тєлѧт-ьма telęt-ьma	тєлѧт-ьмъ telęt-ьmъ
A	тєл-ѧ tel-ę	тєлѧт-ѣ telęt-ě	тєлѧт-а telęt-a
V	тєл-ѧ tel-ę	тєлѧт-ѣ telęt-ě	тєлѧт-а telęt-a
L	тєлѧт-є telęt-e	тєлѧт-ꙋ telęt-u	тєлѧт-ьхъ telęt-ьxъ
I	тєлѧт-ьмь telęt-ьmь	тєлѧт-ьма telęt-ьma	тєлѧт-ꙋ telęt-y

The t-stem (also known as nt-stem) paradigm encompasses neuters denoting a young of an animal or human: отрочѧ, агнѧ, коꙁьлѧ, клюшѧ, осьлѧ, овьчѧ, тєлѧ, жрѣбѧ, etc.

=== r-stems ===
Feminine gender ("mother")
–	Singular	Dual	Plural
N	мат-и mat-i	мат-єр-и mater-i	мат-єр-и mater-i
G	мат-єр-є mater-e	мат-єр-ꙋ mater-u	мат-єр-ъ mater-ъ
D	мат-єр-и mater-i	мат-єр-ьма mater-ьma	мат-єр-ьмъ mater-ьmъ
A	мат-єр-ь mater-ь	мат-єр-и mater-i	мат-єр-и mater-i
V	мат-и mat-i	мат-єр-и mater-i	мат-єр-и mater-i
L	мат-єр-и mater-i	мат-єр-ꙋ mater-u	мат-єр-ьхъ mater-ьxъ
I	мат-єр-ьѭ mater-ьjǫ	мат-єр-ьма mater-ьma	мат-єр-ьми mater-ьmi

r-stem feminines are the nouns мати and дъщи.

== Pronouns ==
=== Personal pronouns ===
Declension of the personal pronouns
Singular	1st person	2nd person	Reflexive
Nominative	азъ	тꙑ	—
Genitive	мене	тебе	себе
Dative	мьнѣ, ми	тебѣ, ти	себѣ, си
Accusative	мѧ	тѧ	сѧ
Locative	мьнѣ	тебѣ	себѣ
Instrumental	мъноѭ	тобоѭ	собоѭ
Dual	1st person	2nd person	Reflexive
Nominative	вѣ	ва	—
Genitive	наю	ваю	себе
Dative	нама, на	вама, ва	себѣ, си
Accusative	на	ва	сѧ
Locative	наю	ваю	себѣ
Instrumental	нама	вама	собоѭ
Plural	1st person	2nd person	Reflexive
Nominative	мꙑ	вꙑ	—
Genitive	насъ	васъ	себе
Dative	намъ, нꙑ	вамъ, вꙑ	себѣ, си
Accusative	нꙑ	вꙑ	сѧ
Locative	насъ	васъ	себѣ
Instrumental	нами	вами	собоѭ

Declension of the third-person pronouns
Singular	Masculine	Neuter	Feminine
Nominative	и	ѥ	ꙗ
Genitive	его	его	ѥѩ
Dative	емоу	емоу	ѥи
Accusative	и, нь	ѥ	ѭ
Locative	ѥмь	ѥмь	ѥи
Instrumental	имь	имь	ѥѭ
Dual	Masculine	Neuter	Feminine
Nominative	ꙗ	и	и
Genitive	ѥю	ѥю	ѥю
Dative	има	има	има
Accusative	ꙗ	и	и
Locative	ѥю	ѥю	ѥю
Instrumental	има	има	има
Plural	Masculine	Neuter	Feminine
Nominative	и	ꙗ	ѩ
Genitive	ихъ	ихъ	ихъ
Dative	имъ	имъ	имъ
Accusative	ѩ	ꙗ	ѩ
Locative	ихъ	ихъ	ихъ
Instrumental	ими	ими	ими

Like the first- and second-person pronouns, the third-person pronoun is commonly used only in oblique cases. Nominative singular forms are not attested in the OCS corpus, and are reconstructed. In the East South Slavic dialectal area where OCS originated, a suppletive nominative singular stem of the demonstrative tъ ('that') is used, elsewhere onъ ('that one there, yon'), or very rarely sь ('this').

By attaching the enclitic particle že to the forms of *i one obtains the relative pronoun: iže ('he who'), ježe ('the (female) one to whom'), jejuže ('the two of whom'), etc.

When following prepositions, these pronouns take a prothetic n-, hence kъ n'imъ ('to them') instead of *imъ, na n'emь ('on him'), etc. This is a remnant of final -m/n in the PIE prepositions *kom (cf. Latin cum, Sanskrit kám), *sm̥ (cf. Sanskrit sám) and *h₁n̥ that yielded the OCS prepositions kъ, sъ, and vъ and then spread analogically to all the other prepositions.

The reflexive pronoun has only singular oblique forms, which is the state of affairs inherited from PIE *swé. The reflexive pronoun refers to the subject as a whole, and can be translated as English -self (in 'myself', 'yourself', 'himself', etc.).

=== Relative pronoun ===
Singular	Masculine	Neuter	Feminine
Nominative	иже	еже	ꙗже
Genitive	егоже	егоже	еѩже
Dative	емоуже	емоуже	еиже
Accusative	иже	еже	ѭже
Locative	емьже	емьже	еиже
Instrumental	имьже	имьже	еѭже
Dual	Masculine	Neuter	Feminine
Nominative	ꙗже	иже	иже
Genitive	еюже	еюже	еюже
Dative	имаже	имаже	имаже
Accusative	ꙗже	иже	иже
Locative	еюже	еюже	еюже
Instrumental	имаже	имаже	имаже
Plural	Masculine	Neuter	Feminine
Nominative	иже	ꙗже	ѩже
Genitive	ихъже	ихъже	ихъже
Dative	имъже	имъже	имъже
Accusative	ѩже	ꙗже	ѩже
Locative	ихъже	ихъже	ихъже
Instrumental	имиже	имиже	имиже

As mentioned, the third-person pronoun *i participates in the formation of the relative pronoun by appending the indeclinable enclitic že. Unlike the third-person pronoun, however, the nominative case forms of the relative pronoun do occur. Similarly, a prothetic n- occurs when following prepositions, e.g., vъ n'ьže ('in which').

=== Interrogative pronoun and adjective ===
Interrogative pronoun
–	Masculine, Feminine	Neuter
N	kъto	čьto (čь)
G	kogo	česo (česogo, čьso, čьsogo)
D	komu	česomu (čьsomu, čemu)
A	kogo	čьto
L	komь	čemь (česomь)
I	cěmь	čimь

The interrogative pronoun ('who?, what?') has singular-only forms, with the masculine and feminine forms syncretized. Variant forms of čьto occurring in some of the oblique cases have been listed in parentheses.

Interrogative adjective (pronoun)
–	Singular			Dual			Plural		
–	Masculine	Feminine	Neuter	Masculine	Feminine	Neuter	Masculine	Feminine	Neuter
N	kyi (ky)	kaja	koje	(kaja)	–	–	cii	kyję	kaja
G	kojego	kojeję (koję)	kojego	(kojeju)	(kojeju)	(kojeju)	kyixъ (koixъ)	kyixъ (koixъ)	kyixъ (koixъ)
D	kojemu	kojei (koi)	kojemu	kyima	kyima	kyima	kyimъ	kyimъ	kyimъ
A	kyi	kǫjǫ (kojǫ)	koje	(kaja)	–	–	kyję	kyję	kaja
L	kojemь	kojei	kojemь	(kojeju)	(kojeju)	(kojeju)	kyixъ	kyixъ	kyixъ
I	kyimь	kojejǫ (kojǫ)	kyimь	kyima	kyima	kyima	kyimi	kyimi	kyimi

The interrogative adjective, sometimes also labelled as the interrogative pronoun ('which?, what sort of?'), also has some variant forms listed in parentheses.

Possessive interrogative adjective (pronoun)
–	Singular			Dual			Plural		
–	Masculine	Feminine	Neuter	Masculine	Feminine	Neuter	Masculine	Feminine	Neuter
N	čii (ky)	čija	čije	(čija)	–	–	čii	čiję	čija
G	čijego	čijeję (koję)	čijego	(čijeju)	(čijeju)	(čijeju)	čiixъ (koixъ)	čiixъ (koixъ)	čiixъ (koixъ)
D	čijemu	čijei (koi)	čijemu	čiima	čiima	čiima	čiimъ	čiimъ	čiimъ
A	čii	čijǫ (kojǫ)	čije	(čija)	–	–	čiję	čiję	čija
L	čijemь	čijei	čijemь	(čijeju)	(čijeju)	(čijeju)	čiixъ	čiixъ	čiixъ
I	čiimь	čijejǫ (kojǫ)	čiimь	čiima	čiima	čiima	čiimi	čiimi	čiimi

The possessive interrogative adjective, sometimes also labelled as the possessive interrogative pronoun ('whose?'), follows the same declension.

=== Indefinite pronouns and adjectives ===
The interrogative pronouns kъto, čьto can also have the indefinite meanings of 'anybody', 'anything' respectively.

The prefix ně- imparts an indefinite meaning to the word to which it is attached: thus kъto ('who?') becomes někъto ('someone'), and čьto ('what?') becomes něčьto ('something'). Similarly, the prefix ni- imparts a negative meaning: nikъto ('no one'), ničьto ('nothing'). A prepositions may come between prefix and base word:

ně u kogo — with someone
ni o komьže nerodiši — you care for no one

== Adjectives ==
OCS adjectives occur in two forms: short and long, indicating indefinite and definite meaning respectively. The long and short forms of the adjective have distinct syntactical roles. In general the long form is used attributively, whereas the short form is predicative: чловѣкъ добръ 'a good man, man is good'; чловѣкъ добрꙑи 'the good man, the man who is good'. The short form is indefinite in meaning, 'man is good'. The combination of a short-form adjective with substantive is used when the signified entity is presented as new, without prior reference. Hence въ пєшть огн҄ьнѫ 'into a furnace, a fiery one'. The long form, by contrast, acts as a pointer and is definite, 'the good man'. The combination of long-form adjective with substantive is used when the adjective presents a quality known to be associated with the substantive modified. Hence въ гєонѫ огн҄ьнѫѭ 'into hell the fiery'. The compound form is often rendered in English by a relative clause: 'into the hell which is fiery'. Adjectives used as substantives are themselves subject to the long and short form distinction. Again the long form refers to a substantive previously introduced or assumed known. Thus привѣшѧ къ н҄ємѹ слѣпа... и имъ слѣпаєго за рѫкѫ 'they brought to him a blind man... and having taken the blind man by the hand...'. In a sequence of coordinated participles used as substantives, it is typical for only the first to use the long form; the subsequent substantives use the short form. Hence слꙑшѧи словєса моꙗ и творѧ ꙗ... 'he who hears my words and does them...'.

Indefinite adjectives are inflected like the corresponding nouns of the primary declension, e.g., novъ as rabъ, nova as žena, novo as selo, ništь as vračь, ništa as duša, nište as polje.

Definite adjectives (also known as compound, long, or pronominal forms of adjective) are formed by suffixing to the indefinite form the anaphoric third-person pronoun jь (spelled as i in OCS orthography), ja, je as shown in the table.

"new"
N	novъ + i (jь) = novъjь > novyi	nova + ja = novaja
G	nova + jego = novajego	novy + jeję = novyję
D	novu + jemu = novujemu	nově + jei = nověi
A	novъ + i (jь) = novъjь > novyi	novǫ + jǫ = novǫjǫ
L	nově + jemь = novějemь	nově + jei = nověi
I	novomь + imь = novъimь > novyimь	novojǫ + jejǫ = novojǫ, novǫjǫ

N, A	nova + ja = novaja	nově + i = nověi
G, L	novu + jeju = novuju	novu + jeju = novuju
D, I	novoma + ima = novyima	novoma + ima = novyima

N	novi + (j)i = novii	novy + ję = novyję
G	novъ + ixъ = novyixъ	novъ + ixъ = novyixъ
D	novomъ + imъ = novyimъ	novamъ + imъ = novyimъ
A	novy + ję = novyję	novy + ję = novyję
L	nověxъ + ixъ = novyixъ	novaxъ + ixъ = novyixъ
I	novy + imi = novyimi	novami + imi = novyimi

=== Adjective gradation ===
There are three levels of adjective gradation in OCS:

- positive, stating an absolute property of an object;
- comparative, stating a relative property of an object;
- superlative, stating a property of an object in relation to any other object it may be compared to.

==== Comparative ====
1. Adjectives with falling tone on the root syllable:
  dragъ ('dear') − draž-ii (m), draž-e (n), draž-ьši (f);
  tęžьkъ ('heavy') − tęžii, tęže, tęžьši;
  grǫbъ ('grumpy') − grǫblii, grǫble, grǫblьši.
2. Adjectives with rising tone on the root syllable:
  novъ ('new') − nov-ěi, nov-ěje, nov-ěiši;
  starъ ('old') − starěi, starěje, starěiši;
  junъ ('young') − juněi, juněje, juněiši.

==== Declension of the comparative ====
N	dražii	draže	dražьši	juněi	juněje	juněiši
G	dražьša	dražьša	dražьšę	juněiša	juněiša	juněišę
D	dražьšu	dražьšu	dražьši	juněišu	juněišu	juněiši
A	dražьšii	draže	dražьšǫ	juněi	juněje	juněišǫ
L	dražьši	dražьši	dražьši	juněiši	junějiši	juněiši
I	dražьšemь	dražьšemь	dražьšejǫ	juněišemь	juněišemь	juněišejǫ

N, A	dražьša	dražьši	dražьši	juněiša	juněiši	juněiši
G, L	dražьšu	dražьšu	dražьšu	juněišu	juněišu	juněišu
D, I	dražьšema	dražьšema	dražьšama	juněišema	juněišema	juněišama

N	dražьše	dražьša	dražьšę	juněiše	juněiša	juněišę
G	dražьšь	dražьšь	dražьšь	juněišь	juněišь	juněišь
D	dražьšemъ	dražьšemъ	dražьšamъ	juněišemъ	juněišemъ	juněišamъ
A	dražьšę	dražьša	dražьšę	juněišę	juněiša	juněišę
L	dražьšixь	dražьšixь	dražьšaxь	juněišixь	juněišixь	juněišaxь
I	dražьši	dražьši	dražьšami	juněiši	juněiši	juněišami

==== Superlative ====
The superlative is formed:

1. by adding the prefix nai- to the comparative base: naidražii, naitęžьši, naigrǫble;
2. by combining the comparative form with the pronoun vьsego/vьsěxъ: nověi vьsego, dražii vьsěxъ.

The absolute superlative is formed:

1. by adding the prefix prě- to the positive: prědragъ, prěnova, prěstaro;
2. by using the adverb ʒělo with the positive: ʒělo dragъ, ʒělo nova, ʒělo staro.

== Numerals ==
=== Cardinals ===
1	jedinъ (m), jedina (f), jedino (n)
2	dъva (m), dъvě (f and n)
3	trьje (m), tri (f and n)
4	četyre (m), četyri (f and n)
5	pętь
6	šestь
7	sedmь
8	osmь
9	devętь
10	desętь
11	jedin-ъ/a/o na desęte
12	dъv-a/ě na desęte
20	dъva desęti
21	dъva desęti i jedin-ъ/a/o
22	dъva desęti i dъv-a/ě
30	trije desęte
40	četyre desęte
50	pętь desętь
60	šestь desętь
70	sedmь desętь
80	osmь desętь
90	devętь desętь
100	sъto
200	dъvě sъtě
300	tri sъta
400	četyre sъta
500	pętь sъtъ
1 000	tysęšti, tysǫšti
2 000	dъvě tysǫšti
5 000	pętь tysǫštь
10 000	desętь tysǫštь or tьma
20 000	dъvadesęti tysǫštь or dъvě tьmě
100 000	sъto tysǫštь or leĝeonъ

==== Declension of cardinal numbers ====
1	pronominal declension jedinъ − jedinogo, jedina − jedinoję
2	pronominal declension, only in dual
3	undergoes i-stem declension, plural forms only
4	exactly like trьje, tri, except for the nominative and genitive which undergo consonant-stem declension
5–10	undergoes i-stem declension, only in singular, except for desętь which also has dual and plural forms
11–19	only the first component is inflected, e.g. jedinomu na desęte
20, 30, 40	both components are inflected, e.g. dъvěma desętьma, trьmь desętьmь
50–90	only the first component is inflected, e.g. pętijǫ desętь

sъto is declined as selo, tysęšti as bogyni, tьma as žena, leĝeonъ as rabъ

=== Ordinals ===
1	prъvyi, prъvaja, prъvoje
2	vъtoryi, vъtoraja, vъtoroje
3	tretii, tretijaja, tretijeje
4	četvrъyi, četvrъaja, četvrъoje
5	pętyi, pętaja, pętoje
11	prъvyi / prъvaja / prъvoje na desęte
20	dъvadesętьn-yi/aja/oje
21	dъvadesętьn-yi/aja/oje prъv-yi/aja/oje
60	šestьdesętьn-yi/aja/oje
100	sъtъn-yi/aja/oje
1 000	tysǫčьn-yi/aja/oje

All ordinals are inflected like the corresponding adjectives.

== Verbs ==
=== Present ===
The present tense is formed by adding present-tense endings onto the present tense stem, which itself is sometimes hidden due to sound changes that have occurred in the past (more common verbs are listed):

- bosti (bod-), vesti (ved- or vez-), krasti (krad-), iti (id-)
- plesti (plet-), mesti (met-), greti (greb-), krasti (krad-)
- rešti (rek-), pešti (pek-), mošti (mog-), tešti (tek-)

There are several classes of verbs:

1. e-type verbs add the suffix -e- to the present stem (except in front of -ǫ) and the endings:

Verb	Singular	Plural	Dual
bosti (bod-) ("stab")	1. bod -ǫ; 2. bod -e + -ši; 3. bod -e + -tъ	1. bod -e + -mъ; 2. bod -e + -te; 3. bod -ǫtъ	1. bod -e + -vě; 2. bod -e + -ta; 3. bod -e + -te
rešti (rek-) ("speak")	1. rek -ǫ; 2. reč -e + -ši; 3. reč -e + -tъ	1. reč -e + -mъ; 2. reč -e + -te; 3. rek -ǫtъ	1. reč -e + -vě; 2. reč -e + -ta; 3. reč -e + -te

2. i-type verbs exhibit the same set of endings, but this time the suffix is -i- (except in front of -ǫ and -ę). In the first person singular one finds the processes of iotation (k/c + j > č, g/z + j > ž, x/s + j > š, l + j > lj, n + j > nj, t + j > št, d + j > žd) and epenthesis (bj > blj, pj > plj, mj > mlj, vj > vlj):

Verb	Singular	Plural	Dual
xvaliti (xval-) ("praise")	1. xval + -j + -ǫ; 2. xval -i + -ši; 3. xval -i + -tъ	1. xval -i + -mъ; 2. xval -i + -te; 3. xval -ętъ	1. xval -i + -vě; 2. xval -i + -ta; 3. xval -i + -te
ljubiti (ljub-) ("love")	1. ljub + -lj + -ǫ; 2. ljub -i + -ši; 3. ljub -i + -tъ	1. ljub -i + -mъ; 2. ljub -i + -te; 3. ljub -ętъ	1. ljub -i + -vě; 2. ljub -i + -ta; 3. ljub -i + -te

3. The athematic verbs byti, dati, věděti, iměti and jasti form the present tense irregularly:

Verb	Singular	Plural	Dual
byti ("be")	1. jesmь; 2. jesi; 3. jestъ	1. jesmъ; 2. jeste; 3. sǫtъ	1. jesvě; 2. jesta; 3. jeste
věděti ("know")	1. věmь; 2. věsi; 3. věstъ	1. věmъ; 2. věste; 3. vědętъ	1. věvě; 2. věsta; 3. věste
iměti ("have")	1. imamь; 2. imaši; 3. imatъ	1. imamъ; 2. imate; 3. imǫtъ	1. imavě; 2. imata; 3. imate
jasti ("eat")	1. jamь; 2. jasi; 3. jastъ	1. jamъ; 2. jaste; 3. jadętъ	1. javě; 2. jasta; 3. jaste

One should distinguish the verbs iměti (imamь, imaši, imatъ), imati (jemljǫ, jemleši, jemletъ) and jęti (imǫ, imeši, imetъ). Exceptional is also the verb xotěti which exhibits iotation even though it's not an i-type verb (xoštǫ, xošteši, xoštetъ).

=== Aorist ===
The aorist is used both to narrate individual events taking place at a specific time in the past, "without reference to other events taking place at the same time or subsequently" and to narrate the beginning or end of events of longer duration. Its most important function is to show that an event took place in the past, rather than to show that it is completed.

The aorist form of imperfective verbs is used instead of the perfective aspect in the case of verbs of motion and perception, as well as of the verbs iměti, and jasti. Imperfective verbs in the aorist are also used when an entire action is negated, and may be used for verbs of saying, although the usual form for "he said" is from a perfective verb, reče.

==== Asigmatic aorist ====
The asigmatic aorist (also called root or simple aorist) was named after the loss of the phoneme /s/ in the inflection (AGr. sigma), i.e. there is no VsV > VxV change (intervocalic /s/ yielding /x/). Over time, the asigmatic aorist became increasingly marked as an archaic language feature and was eventually replaced by the other two aorist formations.

The asigmatic aorist was formed by adding to the infinitive stem of e-type verbs with stem ending in a consonant (i.e. verbs with the infix -nǫ-, which is dropped before the aorist endings, and verbs with the null infix) the following endings: -ъ, -e, -e; -omъ, -ete, -ǫ; -ově, -eta, -ete.

Verb	Singular	Plural	Dual
pasti (pad-) ("fall")	1. pad -ъ; 2. pad -e 3. pad -e	1. pad -omъ; 2. pad -ete 3. pad -ǫ	1. pad -ově; 2. pad -eta 3. pad -ete
tešti (tek-) ("flow")	1. tek -ъ; 2. teč -e 3. teč -e	1. tek -omъ; 2. teč -ete 3. tek -ǫ	1. tek -ově; 2. teč -eta 3. teč -ete
mošti (mog-) ("be able to")	1. mog -ъ; 2. mož -e 3. mož -e	1. mog -omъ; 2. mož -ete 3. mog -ǫ	1. mog -ově; 2. mož -eta 3. mož -ete
dvignǫti (dvig-) ("move")	1. dvig -ъ; 2. dviž -e 3. dviž -e	1. dvig -omъ; 2. dviž -ete 3. dvig -ǫ	1. dvig -ově; 2. dviž -eta 3. dviž -ete

==== Sigmatic aorist ====
The sigmatic or s-aorist was formed in the following ways:

- Verbs whose stem ends in b, p, d, t, z, s form this aorist by dropping the final consonant and adding the suffix -s- plus the endings -ъ, -, -; -omъ, -te, -ę; -ově, -ta, -te. Intervocalic sigma (s) exhibits no change. As a side effect, e is lengthened to ě, and o to a.
- Verbs whose stem ends in r or k form this aorist in the same way as previously mentioned, except that intervocalic sigma (s) changes into x, the same set of endings being suffixed to the suffix. As a side effect, e is lengthened to ě, and o to a.
- Verbs whose stem ends in a vowel form this aorist by suffixing exactly the same set of endings to the infinitive stem, and intervocalic -s- changes into -x-.

The 2nd and 3rd person singular forms of these verbs match the infinitive stem due to the elision of word-final sigma.

Verb	Singular	Plural	Dual
xvaliti (xvali-)	1. xvali -x -ъ; 2. xvali 3. xvali	1. xvali -x -omъ; 2. xvali -s -te 3. xvali -š -ę	1. xvali -x -ově; 2. xvali -s -ta 3. xvali -s -te
tešti (tek-)	1. těxъ (tek -s -ъ); 2. teče 3. teče	1. těxomъ (tek -s -omъ); 2. těste 3. těšę	1. těxově (tek -s -ově); 2. těsta 3. těste
greti (greb-)	1. grěsъ; 2. grebe 3. grebe	1. grěsomъ; 2. grěste 3. grěsę	1. grěsově; 2. grěsta 3. grěste
bosti (bod-)	1. basъ; 2. bode 3. bode	1. basomъ; 2. baste 3. basę	1. basově; 2. basta 3. baste

==== New aorist ====
The new aorist (also known as ox-aorist) is formed by suffixing to the infinitive stem of e-type verbs ending in a consonant (verbs with the suffix -nǫ- and verbs with the null suffix) the suffix -os- (-ox) and onto it the endings -ъ, -, -; -omъ, -te, -ę; -ově, -ta, -te. Intervocalic sigma s changes into x.

The 2nd and the 3rd person singular forms are not attested and thus the asigmatic aorist forms are taken as a replacement.

Verb	Singular	Plural	Dual
krasti (krad-) ("steal")	1. krad -ox -ъ; 2. (krad -e); 3. (krad -e)	1. krad -ox -omъ; 2. krad -os -te 3. krad -oš -ę	1. krad -ox -ově; 2. krad -os -ta 3. krad -os -te
rešti (rek-)	1. rek -ox -ъ; 2. (reč -e); 3. (reč -e)	1. rek -ox -omъ; 2. rek -os -te 3. rek -oš -ę	1. rek -ox -ově; 2. rek -os -ta 3. rek -os -te
iti (id-) ("go/walk")	1. id -ox -ъ; 2. (id -e); 3. (id -e)	1. id -ox -omъ; 2. id -os -te 3. id -oš -ę	1. id -ox -ově; 2. id -os -ta 3. id -os -te

=== Imperfect ===
The imperfect is used either for continuous or repeated actions in the past. It is typically used to form a background in a narration, and forms a contrast with the aorist and other verb forms: it often shows that an action took place at the same time as another. Actions in the imperfect are almost always incomplete, and the tense is typically only used with verbs in the imperfective aspect. Rarely, it can be formed with perfective verbs.

There are two ways of forming the imperfect:

1. If the infinitive stems ends in -a or -ě, the suffix -ax- is appended (which changes to -aš- according to the first palatalization in front of e) and onto it, the endings of the asigmatic aorist: -ъ, -e, -e; -omъ, -ete, -ǫ; -ově, -eta, -ete.

Verb	Singular	Plural	Dual
glagolati (glagola-) ("speak")	1. glagola -ax -ъ; 2. glagola -aš -e 3. glagola -aš -e	1. glagola -ax -omъ; 2. glagola -aš -ete 3. glagola -ax -ǫ	1. glagola -ax -ově; 2. glagola -aš -eta 3. glagola -aš -ete
viděti (vidě-) ("see")	1. vidě -ax -ъ; 2. vidě -aš -e 3. vidě -aš -e	1. vidě -ax -omъ; 2. vidě -aš -ete 3. vidě -ax -ǫ	1. vidě -ax -ově; 2. vidě -aš -eta 3. vidě -aš -ete

2. The other way of forming the imperfect, applying to all other verbal stems, is by adding onto the present stem the suffix -ěax- (which, in accordance with the first palatalization, is changed to -ěaš- in front of e) and onto it the endings of asigmatic aorist: -ъ, -e, -e; -omъ, -ete, -ǫ; -ově, -eta, -ete.

Verb	Singular	Plural	Dual
zъvati (zov-) ("call")	1. zov -ě -ax -ъ; 2. zov -ě -aš -e 3. zov -ě -aš -e	1. zov -ě -ax -omъ; 2. zov -ě -aš -ete 3. zov -ě -ax -ǫ	1. zov -ě -ax -ově; 2. zov -ě -aš -eta 3. zov -ě -aš -ete
bosti (bod-) ("stab")	1. bod -ě -ax -ъ; 2. bod -ě -aš -e 3. bod -ě -aš -e	1. bod -ě -ax -omъ; 2. bod -ě -aš -ete 3. bod -ě -ax -ǫ	1. bod -ě -ax -ově; 2. bod -ě -aš -eta 3. bod -ě -aš -ete

Both of these imperfect formations often occur side by side in verbs with stem alternation:

- bьrati (bьra-; ber-) > bьraaxъ or berěaxъ
- gъnati (gъna-; žen-) > gъnaaxъ or ženěaxъ
- plьvati (plьva-; pljuj-) > plьvaaxъ or pljujěaxъ
- zъvati (zъva-; zov-) > zъvaaxъ or zověaxъ

In the texts of the OCS canon the forms are often contracted, so that ěax becomes ěx and aax becomes ax. An illustrating example is in Chernorizets Hrabar's famous work O pismenex "An Account of Letters":

Prěžde ubo slověne ne iměxǫ knigъ, nǫ črъtami i rězami čьtěxǫ i gataaxǫ, pogani sǫšte.

Some forms exhibit sound changes, namely palatalization or iotation in front of ě, yat thus turning into a. The same applies if the stem ends in j which is then reduced in front of yat and yat again changes into a:

- xvaliti (xval-) > xval + ě + axъ > xvaljaaxъ
- nositi (nos-) > nos + ě + axъ > nošaaxъ
- pešti (pek-) > pek + ě + axъ > pečaaxъ
- čuti (čuj-) > čuj + ě + axъ > čujaaxъ

That the second form and not the first is the original one (the first being formed by the change of yat to a) is confirmed by the imperfect paradigm of the verb byti:

Verb	Singular	Plural	Dual
byti	1. běaxъ; 2. běaše 3. běaše	1. běaxomъ; 2. běašete 3. běaxǫ	1. běaxově; 2. běašeta 3. běašete

=== Participles ===
==== Present active participle ====
The present active participle is formed by adding the following endings to the present stem:

1. e-type verbs and athematic verbs:

- present stem + -y (masculine and neuter) and -ǫšti (feminine)

(e.g., greti (greb-) > greby; grebǫšti)

2. e-type verbs whose present stem ends in a palatal:

- present stem + -ę (masculine and neuter) and -ǫšti (feminine)

(e.g., kupovati (kupuj-) > kupuję, kupujǫšti)

3. i-type verbs:

- present stem + -ę (masculine and neuter) and -ęšti (feminine)

(e.g., ljubiti (ljub-) > ljubę, ljubęšti)

==== Present passive participle ====
The present passive participle is formed by suffixing to the present stem the endings -o/e/i + m + ъ/a/o (masculine, feminine, neuter):

1. e-type verbs and athematic verbs:

- present stem + o + m + ъ/a/o

(e.g., pešti (pek-) > pekomъ, pekoma, pekomo)

2. e-type verbs whose stem ends in a palatal:

- present stem + e + m + ъ/a/o

(e.g., želeti (želj-) > željemъ, željema, željemo)

3. i-type verbs:

- present stem + i + m + ъ/a/o

(e.g., xvaliti (xval-) > xvalimъ, xvalima, xvalimo)

==== Past active participle ====
The past active participle is formed by suffixing to the infinitive stem the following endings:

1. e-type verbs and athematic verbs:

- infinitive stem + -ъ (masculine and neuter) or -ъši (feminine)

(e.g., bosti (bod-) > bodъ, bodъši)

2. i-type verbs exhibit epenthetic v, which eliminates hiatus:

- infinitive stem + -vъ (masculine and neuter) or -vъši (feminine)

(e.g., xvaliti (xvali-) > xvalivъ, xvalivъši)

The latter i-type verbs have twofold forms of this participle – the mentioned one of older origin, and a newer one which arose due to analogical leveling:

- nositi (nosi-) > nošъ, nošъši (by iotation from + jъ, jъši) or nosivъ, nosivъši
- roditi (rod-) > roždъ, roždъši (by iotation from + jъ, jъši) or rodivъ, rodivъši

3. Verbs with liquid metathesis form this participle from its older stem form:

- mrěti (< *merti) > mьrъ, mьrъši (and not mrěvъ, mrěvъši)
- prostrěti (< *prosterti) > prostьrъ, prostьrъši (and not prostrěvъ, prostrěvъši)

4. Irregular participles:

- iti > šьdъ, šьdъši
- jaxati > javъ, javъši

==== l-participle ====
The l-participle (also known as the resultative participle or second past active participle) is formed by adding to the infinitive stem the suffix -l- and the endings ъ/a/o. If the stem ends in -t or -d, this consonant is dropped.

- xvaliti (xvali) > xvalilъ, xvalila, xvalilo
- plesti (plet-) > plelъ, plela, plelo

==== Past passive participle ====
The past passive participle is formed by suffixing to the infinitive stem the following endings:

1. Verbs with stem ending in a consonant, -y or -i:

- infinitive stem + en + ъ/a/o

(e.g., bosti (bod-) > bodenъ, bodena, bodeno)
(e.g., nositi (nosi-) > nošenъ, nošena, nošeno – by iotation from nosi + enъ > nosjenъ > nošenъ)
(e.g., umyti with suffix -ъv- > umъvenъ, umъvena, umъveno)

2. Verbs with stem ending in -a or -ě:

- infinitive stem + n + ъ/a/o

(e.g., glagolati (glagola-) > glagolanъ, glagolana, glagolano)
(e.g., viděti (vidě-) > vižden, viždena, viždeno – by iotation from viděn, viděna, viděno)

3. Verbs with stem ending in -ę, -u, -i and -ě (obtained by liquid metathesis):

- infinitive stem + t + ъ/a/o

(e.g., klęti (klę-) > klętъ, klęta, klęto)
(e.g., obuti (obu-) > obutъ, obuta, obuto)
(e.g., mrěti (mrě-) > mrětъ, mrěta, mrěto)
(e.g., viti (vi-) > vitъ, vita, vito)

Of the latter verbs, those with stem ending in -i (viti, biti etc.) can also form the past passive participle like the verbs in the first group: bitъ or bijenъ, vitъ or vijenъ etc.).

=== Compound tenses ===
==== Perfect ====
The perfect is formed by combining the l-participle with the imperfective present forms of the auxiliary verb byti.

- nosilъ/a/o jesmь, jesi, jestъ
- nosili/y/a jesmъ, jeste, sǫtь
- nosila/ě/ě jesvě, jesta, jeste

==== Pluperfect ====
The pluperfect can be formed in multiple ways, by combining the l-participle with the perfect, imperfect or aorist formation of the auxiliary verb byti.

- nosilъ/a/o bylъ/a/o jesmь or běaxъ or běxъ
- nosili/y/a byli/y/a jesmъ or běaxomъ or běxomъ
- nosila/ě/ě byla/ě/ě jesvě or běaxově or běxově

==== Future ====
The future tense is usually expressed using the present tense form of the perfective verb. Imperfective verbs form the future tense by combining the auxiliary verb (byti, xotěti, načęti, iměti) and the infinitive.

- bǫdǫ / xoštǫ / načьnǫ / imamь xvaliti

==== Future perfect ====
The future perfect is formed by combining the l-participle with the perfective present of the auxiliary verb byti.

- nosilъ/a/o bǫdǫ, bǫdeši, bǫdetъ
- nosili/y/a bǫdemъ, bǫdete, bǫdǫtъ
- nosila/ě/ě bǫdevě, bǫdeta, bǫdete

==== Conditional ====
The conditional (or conditional-optative) modal formation is formed by combining the l-participle with special modal forms of the auxiliary verb byti (with unattested dual forms):

- nosilъ/a/o bimь, bi, bi
- nosili/y/a bimъ, biste, bǫ/bišę

An alternative conditional is formed with the perfective aorist forms of byti:

- nosilъ/a/o byxъ, by, by
- nosili/y/a byxomъ, byste, byšę

== Adverbs ==
=== Primary adverbs ===
These are original adverbs with difficult to guess etymology and origin.

- abьje (abije) 'right away'
- jedъva 'hardly, barely'
- ješte 'yet, still'
- nyně 'now, today'
- paky 'again, back'
- (j)uže 'already'

=== Derived adverbs ===
==== Pronominal adverbs ====
Pronominal adverbs are derived by suffixing pronouns (e.g., ov + amo = ovamo, kъ + de = kъde):

- -amo = direction of movement (tamo, kamo, onamo)
- -ako / -ače = way, mode, manner (tako, inako, inače)
- -de = place (sьde, onude, vьsьde)
- -gda = time (tъgda, kъgda, egda)
- -lь / -li / / -lě / -lьma / -lьmi = measure, amount (kolь, kolě, kolьmi)

==== Nominal adverbs ====
Nominal adverbs are derived from nominals or turn by conversion to adverbs which are in fact inflective lexemes with adverbial semantics.

Modal adverbs are created with the suffixes -o or -ě (the endings of accusative and locative singular neuter gender respectively), with no difference in meanings between suffixes, although some adverbs have only the forms in -o (veselo), and some in -ě (javě).

Modal adverbs could also be formed deadjectivally by means of the suffix -ьsk- and the ending -y (by origin, the instrumental plural ending; e.g., slověnьsky).

Adverbs could also be formed with the suffix -ь (pravь, različь) and are by origin probably inherited Proto-Slavic accusative forms.

Frequently occurring are the adverbialized a-stem instrumentals such as jednьnojǫ and also adverbially used oblique cases.

Locative adverbs are by origin mostly petrified locative case forms of nouns: gorě, dolě, nizu, and the same can be said for temporal adverbs: zimě, polu dьne.

== Prepositions ==
=== Primary prepositions ===
The primary and non-derived prepositions are of PIE and PSl. heritage:

- bez 'without' + G
- iz or is 'from, out' + G
  izdrǫky < iz rǫky — from the hand
- kъ 'to, for, unto' + D
  ..reče že Marθa kъ Iisusu.. — and Martha said unto Jesus
- na 'on, to, upon' + A (denoting direction) or L (denoting place)
  zlijašę ognь na zemьjǫ — they poured fire on earth
- nadъ 'on, upon, over' + A (denoting direction) or I (denoting place)
  nadъ glavǫ — over the head
- o or ob 'over, round, about' + A (denoting direction) or L (denoting place)
  ob noštь vьsǫ — the whole night through
- otъ 'from, away' + G
  otъ nebese — from heaven
- po originally 'under, below' + D (extension in space), A (extension in space or time) or L (temporal and local)
  po vьsę grady — through all towns
  po tomь že — after that
  po morjǫ xodę — walking over the sea
- podъ 'under, beneath' + A (denoting direction) or I (denoting situation, location)
  podъ nogy, podъ nogama — under the feet
- pri 'at, at the time' + L
  pri vraƷěxъ — among the heathen
- prědъ 'in front of, before' + A (denoting direction) or I (denoting situation)
  prědъ gradomь — in the vicinity of the city
- sъ 'for the extent of' + A, "from, off, away" + G, "with" + I (denoting association, not instrument)
  sъ lakъtь — a cubit long
  sъ nebese — down from heaven
  sъ nimь — with him
- u 'at, in' + G
  u dvьrьcь — at the doors
- vъ 'in' + A (denoting direction) or L (denoting place)
  vъ tъ dьnь — that day
  vъ kupě — together
- vъz or vъs 'for, in exchange for' + A
  vъs kǫjǫ — why?
- za 'for, after, behind' + A (denoting direction), I (denoting place) or G (in the sense "because")
  ęti za vlasy — to seize by the hair

=== Secondary prepositions ===
The secondary prepositions are derived from adverbial expressions: vьslědъ from vь slědъ, prěžde is a comparative form of prědъ etc.

== Conjunctions and particles ==
Conjunctions and particles are not easily separable because they sometimes function as an intensifier, and sometimes as a conjunction.

a, ali	'but'	proclitic	setting two parts of a statement in opposition
ako, jako, ěko	'that, so that, how, when, as'	proclitic	introducing indirect or direct speech; highly context-dependent
ašte	'if, whether'	proclitic	a conditional particle, also used to generalize relative pronouns
bo	'for, because'	enclitic	denoting causative relationships (i + bo = ibo, u + bo = ubo)
da	'in order that'	proclitic	introducing final result
i	'and; even, too'	proclitic	connecting clauses or used as an adverb within a clause
ide	'for, since'	proclitic	
jegda, jegdaže	'when, if'	proclitic	
jeda	'surely not'	proclitic	introducing a question expecting a negative answer
li li...li	'or' 'either... or'	proclitic or enclitic	generally when forming a question; when enclitic, usually a direct question, when proclitic, taking the meaning 'or'
ne ne...ni	"not' 'neither... nor'		ne generally occurs before the negated item, occurring usually once in the main clause, but ni may occur several times in the same clause
nъ	'but'	proclitic	connecting two clauses
to	'then, so'	proclitic	correlative to ašte
že	'on the other hand, or, and'	enclitic	the commonest particle functioning both as an intensifier and a conjunction; often bound to pronouns and adverbs (jakože, nikъto že)
