= Richard Eedes =

Richard Eedes may refer to:

- Richard Edes, English churchman
- Richard Eedes (divine)
