= John Eedes =

English divine

John Eedes (1609?-1667?), was an English divine.

Eedes was a son of Nicholns Eedes, born at Salisbury, Wiltshire, was entered at Oriel College, Oxford, in 1626, and proceeded B.A. 3 June 1630. He afterwards 'became a minister in the isle of Shepie, whence being ejected in the time of the rebellion suffer'd much by imprisonment in Ely House, and other miseries'.

On his release he took the curacy of Broad Chalk, Wiltshire, which he held 'with much ado' for about two years, and was then made vicar of Hale, Hampshire. After the Restoration he continued at Hale, where he was murdered in his house by thieves in or about 1667, and was buried in the church. He published 'The Orthodox Doctrine concerning Justification by Faith asserted and vindicated, wherein the Book of Mr. William Eyre ... is examined; and also the Doctrine of Mr. Baxter... discussed,' 4to, London, 1654. In dedicating it to his friend, Edward Dodington, Eedes states that he had written another and more elaborate treatise on justification, besides 'other things, both practical and polemical, which I have in readinesse for the presse.'
