= Vocative case =

Grammatical case for noun addressed

In grammar, the vocative case (abbreviated voc) is a grammatical case which is used for a noun that identifies a person (animal, object, etc.) being addressed or occasionally for the noun modifiers (determiners, adjectives, participles, and numerals) of that noun.

However, recent literature contains lively debate about the extent to which such vocative suffixes share crucial properties with prototypical case; see Maché (2025) for an extensive discussion.

Typically, case is assigned by verbs, prepositions, nouns, or adjectives to their complements. In the case of vocatives, this is less straightforward, since there is no phonologically realised assigner. Moreover, some languages, including Bulgarian, have lost all overt realisation of case assigned by verbs and prepositions while retaining vocative suffixes. Moreover, there are languages such as Mandarin that do not mark distinct cases with overt morphology but nevertheless feature vocative markers. In many other languages, the realisation of vocatives may differ substantially from that of the remaining cases. Although the large majority of case languages realise case through suffixation, many of these languages mark vocatives by other morphological means, such as truncation, stress shift, or intonational marking, for instance the new Russian vocative or prenominal vocative particles in Arabic. Finally, vocative suffixes are notoriously difficult to distinguish from other forms of realisations such as vocative particles that occur as clitics that follow the noun such as in many African languages.

Some recent theories subscribing to Ross' performative hypothesis however maintain that vocative is a case in the narrow sense which is assigned by a phonologically empty speech act predicate such as Hill.

A noun of address is an expression of direct address by which the identity of the party spoken to is set forth expressly within a sentence. For example, in the sentence "I don't know, John," John is a noun of address that indicates the party being addressed, as opposed to the sentence "I don't know John", in which "John" is the direct object of the verb "know".

As observed by Zwicky, vocative case is used to express at least two functions: (i) as a call aimed to attract the attention of an unratified overhearer, as (ii) address to maintain and perform the social relation towards the hearer.

Some authors including Gutzmann assume that so-called expressive vocatives are further distinct vocative function.

Historically, the vocative case was an element of the Indo-European case system and existed in Latin, Sanskrit, and Ancient Greek. In many modern Indo-European languages (English, Spanish, etc.) the vocative case has been absorbed by the nominative, but others still distinguish it, including the Baltic languages, some Celtic languages, Modern Greek and most Slavic languages. Some linguists, such as Albert Thumb, argue that the vocative form originated as the bare form of a noun when it does not belong to any case, and that its vocative role came about because nouns of address do not play a syntactic role in relation to other words in sentences; since case suffixes mark these syntactic roles, one was not required. Pronouns usually lack vocative forms.

== Indo-European languages ==
=== Comparison ===
Distinct vocative forms are assumed to have existed in all early Indo-European languages and survive in some. Here is, for example, the Indo-European word for "wolf" in various languages:

Language	Nominative	Vocative
Proto-Indo-European	*wl̩kʷ-o-s	*wl̩kʷ-e
Sanskrit	वृकः॑ (vṛ́k-a-ḥ)	वृक॑ (vṛ́k-a)
Classical Greek	λύκος (lúk-o-s)	λύκε (lúk-e)
Latin	lup-u-s	lup-e
Lithuanian	vil̃k-a-s	vil̃k-e
Old Church Slavonic	влькъ (vlĭk-ŭ)	вльче (vlĭč-e)

The elements separated with hyphens denote the stem, the so-called thematic vowel of the case and the actual suffix. In Latin, for example, the nominative case is lupus and the vocative case is lupe, but the accusative case is lupum. The asterisks before the Proto-Indo-European words means that they are theoretical reconstructions and are not attested in a written source. The symbol ◌̩ (vertical line below) indicates a consonant serving as a vowel. All final consonants were lost in Proto-Slavic, so both the nominative and vocative Old Church Slavonic forms do not have true endings, only reflexes of the old thematic vowels.

Vocative singulars in Slavic languages appear to be irregular as a consequence of the Slavic first palatalization, which caused *k, *g and *x, when followed by an *e (as in the vocative suffix), to become č, ž, and š, respectively. Some modern Slavic languages have replaced these forms with a more regular vocative ending, so for example in Czech the usual masculine animate vocative is -e, except for roots ending in velar consonants, where it is now usually -u (e.g. chlap > chlape, but vlk > vlku). This is an instance of the paradigmatic complexity introduced into Slavic by successive waves of palatalisation, with some languages retaining more complex or irregular paradigms (such as Czech), and others tending towards simplification and regularization (such as Russian, which has lost the vocative as a productive case entirely).

=== Baltic languages ===
==== Lithuanian ====
The vocative is distinct in singular and identical to the nominative in the plural, for all inflected nouns. Nouns with a nominative singular ending in -a have a vocative singular usually identically written but distinct in accentuation.

In Lithuanian, the form that a given noun takes depends on its declension class and, sometimes, on its gender. There have been several changes in history, the last being the -ai ending formed between the 18th and 19th centuries. The older forms are listed under "other forms".

Masculine nouns	Nominative	Vocative		Translation	Feminine nouns	Nominative	Vocative		Translation
Masculine nouns	Nominative	Current standard	Other forms	Translation	Feminine nouns	Nominative	Current standard	Other forms	Translation
o-stems	vilkas	vilke!		wolf	a-stems	tautà [sg.]	taũta!		people
jo-stems	vėjas	vėjau!	Old Lith. vėje!	wind	e-stems	katė	kate!		cat
ijo-stems	gaidys	gaidy!		rooster	i-stems	avis	avie!		sheep
a-stems	viršilà	viršìla!		sergeant-major	r-stems	duktė	dukterie!	dukter!	daughter
e-stems	dėdė	dėde!		uncle	irregular	marti	marti/marčia!		daughter-in-law
i-stems	vagis	vagie!		thief	proper names	Dalià	Dãlia!		
u-stems	sūnus	sūnau!		son	diminutives	sesutė	sesut(e)!		little sister
n-stems	vanduo	vandenie!	vanden!	water					
proper names	Jonas	Jonai!	Old Lith. Jone!	John					
diminutives	sūnelis	sūneli!		little son					

Some nouns of the e- and a- stems declensions (both proper ones and not) are stressed differently: "aikštė": "aikšte!" (square); "tauta": "tauta!". In addition, nouns of e-stems have an ablaut of long vowel ė in nominative and short vowel e /ɛ/ in vocative. In pronunciation, ė is close-mid vowel [eː], and e is open-mid vowel /ɛ/.

The vocative of diminutive nouns with the suffix -(i)ukas most frequently has no ending: broliùk "brother!", etc. A less frequent alternative is the ending -ai, which is also slightly dialectal: broliùkai, etc.

Colloquially, some personal names with a masculine -(i)(j)o stem and diminutives with the suffixes -elis, -ėlis have an alternative vocative singular form characterized by a zero ending (i.e. the stem alone acts as the voc. sg.): Adõm "Adam!" in addition to Adõmai, Mýkol "Michael!" in addition to Mýkolai, vaikẽl "kid!" in addition to vaikẽli, etc.

=== Celtic languages ===
==== Goidelic languages ====
===== Irish =====
The vocative case in Irish operates in a similar fashion to Scottish Gaelic. The principal marker is the vocative particle a, which causes lenition of the following initial letter.

In the singular there is no special form, except for first declension nouns. These are masculine nouns that end in a broad (non-palatal) consonant, which is made slender (palatal) to build the singular vocative (as well as the singular genitive and plural nominative). Adjectives are also lenited. In many cases this means that (in the singular) masculine vocatives resemble the genitive and feminine vocatives resemble the nominative.

The vocative plural is usually the same as the nominative plural except, again, for first declension nouns. In the standard language first declension nouns show the vocative plural by adding -a. In the spoken dialects, the vocative plural often has the same form as the nominative plural (as with the nouns of other declensions) or the dative plural (e.g. A fhearaibh! = Men!).

Gender		Masculine			Feminine		
Sg.	Nominative	an fear mór	an buachaill mór	Seán	an bhean mhór	an deirfiúr mhór	Máire
Sg.	Genitive	an fhir mhóir	an bhuachalla mhóir	Sheáin	na mná móire	na deirféar móire	Mháire
Sg.	Vocative	a fhir mhóir	a bhuachaill mhóir	a Sheáin	a bhean mhór	a dheirfiúr mhór	a Mháire
Pl.	Nominative	na fir móra	na buachaillí móra		na mná móra	na deirfiúracha móra	
Pl.	Genitive	na bhfear mór	na mbuachaillí móra		na mban mór	na ndeirfiúracha móra	
Pl.	Vocative	a fheara móra	a bhuachaillí móra		a mhná móra	a dheirfiúracha móra	
English		the big man	the big boy	John	the big woman	the big sister	Mary

===== Scottish Gaelic =====
The vocative case in Scottish Gaelic follows the same basic pattern as Irish. The vocative case causes lenition of the initial consonant of nouns. Lenition changes the initial sound of the word (or name).

In addition, masculine nouns are slenderized if possible (that is, in writing, an 'i' is inserted before the final consonant) This also changes the pronunciation of the word.

Also, the particle a is placed before the noun unless it begins with a vowel (or f followed immediately by a vowel, which becomes silent when lenited). Examples of the use of the vocative personal names (as in Irish):

Nominative case	Vocative case
Caitrìona	a Chaitrìona
Dòmhnall	a Dhòmhnaill
Màiri	a Mhàiri
Seumas	a Sheumais
Ùna	Ùna
Ùisdean	Ùisdein
cù	a choin
bean	a bhean
duine	a dhuine

The name "Hamish" is just the English spelling of Sheumais (the vocative of Seumas and pronounced /ˈheːmɪʃ/), and thus is actually a Gaelic vocative. Likewise, the name "Vairi" is an English spelling of Mhàiri, the vocative for Màiri.

The vocative plural tends to follow the same pattern as the historic dative plural. It is still in use for certain nouns, e.g. fhearaibh! (pronounced /ˈɛɾɪv/, /ˈɛɾu/) for fear, man, and a bhalachaibh! for balach, boys.

===== Manx =====
The basic pattern is similar to Irish and Scottish. The vocative is confined to personal names, in which it is common. Foreign names (not of Manx origin) are not used in the vocative. The vocative case causes lenition of the initial consonant of names. It can be used with the particle "y".

Nominative case	Vocative case
Juan	y Yuan
Donal	y Ghonal
Moirrey	y Voirrey
Catreeney	y Chatreeney
John	John

The name Voirrey is actually the Manx vocative of Moirrey (Mary).

==== Brythonic languages ====
===== Welsh =====
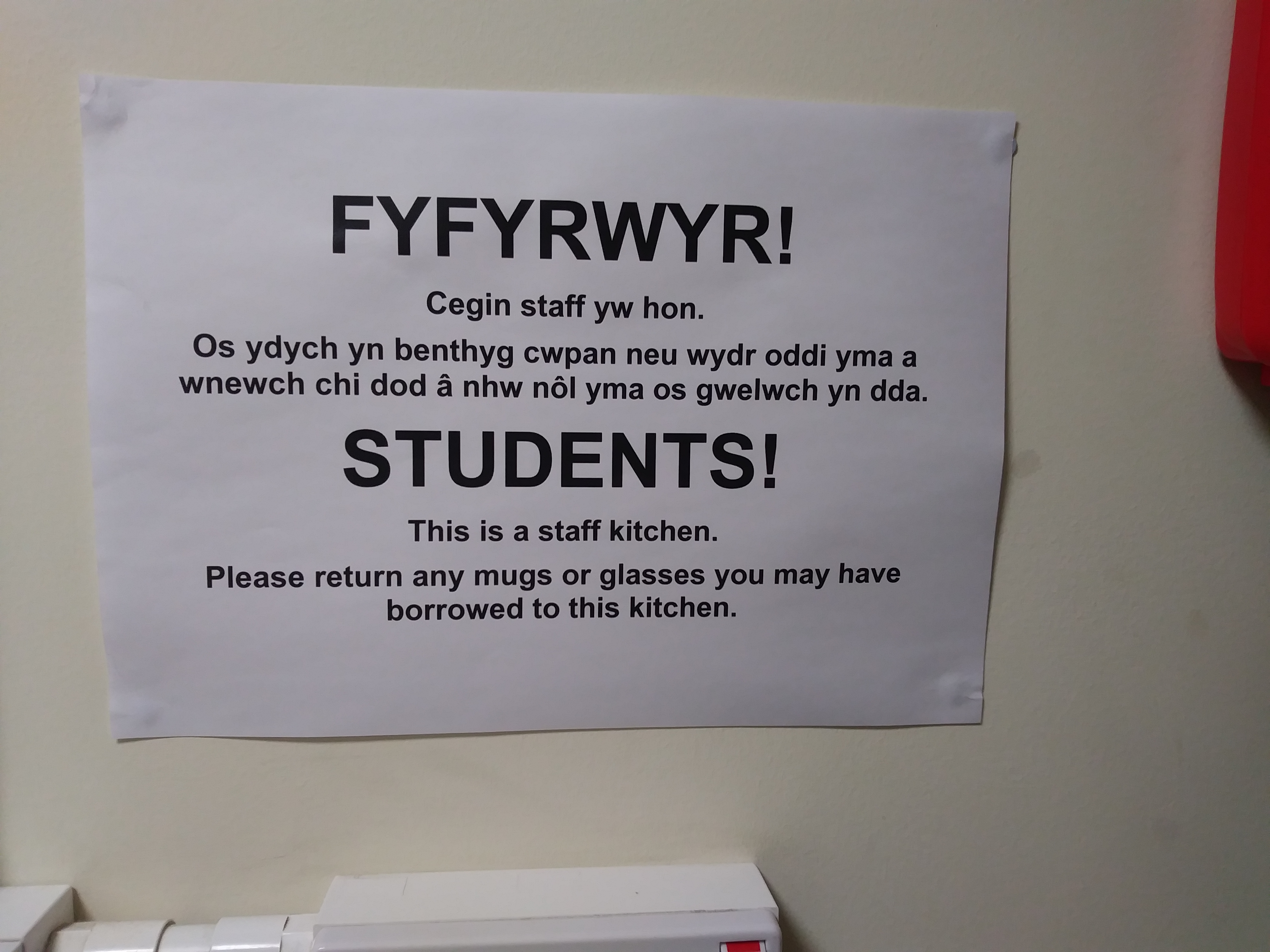
Sign at Aberystwyth University in Welsh displaying use of the vocative case – myfyrwyr 'students' mutated to fyfyrwyr

Welsh lacks case declension but marks vocative constructions by lenition of the initial consonant of the word, with no obligatory particle. Despite its use being less common, it is still used in formal address: the common phrase foneddigion a boneddigesau means "gentlemen and ladies", with the initial consonant of boneddigion undergoing a soft mutation; the same is true of gyfeillion ("[dear] friends") in which cyfeillion has been lenited. It is often used to draw attention to at public notices orally and written – teachers will say "Blant" (mutation of plant 'children') and signage such as one right show mutation of myfyrwyr 'students' to draw attention to the importance of the notice.

=== Germanic languages ===
==== English ====
The vocative is not a grammatical case in English. Expressions for which the vocative would be used in languages which have that case, are nominative in English. In translations of languages that use the vocative case, translators have sometimes added the particle "O" before the noun, as is often seen in the King James Version of the Bible: for example the Greek ὀλιγόπιστοι, vocative masculine plural (in Matthew 8:26), is translated "O ye of little faith". While it is not strictly archaic, it is sometimes used to "archaeise" speech; it is often seen as very formal, and sees use in rhetoric and poetry, or as a comedic device to subvert modern speech. Another example is the recurrent use of the phrase "O (my) Best Beloved" by Rudyard Kipling in his Just So Stories. O may be considered a form of clitic and should not be confused with the interjection oh. However, as the Oxford English Dictionary points out, "O" and "oh" were originally used interchangeably.

Modern English commonly uses the objective case for nouns of address but sets them off from the rest of the sentences with pauses as interjections, rendered in writing as commas (the vocative comma). Two common examples of nouns of address in English are the phrases "Mr. President" and "Madam Chairwoman".

Some traditional texts use Jesu, the Latin vocative form of Jesus. One of the best-known examples is Jesu, Joy of Man's Desiring.

==== German dialects ====
In some German dialects, like the Ripuarian dialect of Cologne, it is common to use the (gender-appropriate) article before a person's name. In the vocative phrase then the article is, as in Venetian and Catalan, omitted. Thus, the determiner precedes nouns in all cases except the vocative. Any noun not preceded by an article or other determiner is in the vocative case. It is most often used to address someone or some group of living beings, usually in conjunction with an imperative construct. It can also be used to address dead matter as if the matter could react or to tell something astonishing or just happening such as "Your nose is dripping."

Colognian examples:

Do es der Päul — Päul, kumm ens erövver!	There is Paul. Paul, come over [please]!
Och do leeven Kaffepott, do bes jo am dröppe!	O [my] dear coffee pot, you are dripping!
„Pääde, jooht loufe!“ Un di Pääde jonn loufe.	"Horses, run away!" And the horses are running away.

==== Icelandic ====
The vocative case generally does not appear in Icelandic, but a few words retain an archaic vocative declension from Latin, such as the word Jesús, which is Jesú in the vocative. That comes from Latin, as the Latin for Jesus in the nominative is Jesus and its vocative is Jesu. That is also the case in traditional English (without the accent) (see above):

Nominative	Jesús elskar þig.	Jesus loves you.
Vocative	Ó Jesú, frelsari okkar.	O Jesus, our saviour.

The native words sonur 'son' and vinur 'friend' also sometimes appear in the shortened forms son and vin in vocative phrases. Additionally, adjectives in vocative phrases are always weakly declined, but elsewhere with proper nouns, they would usually be declined strongly:

strong adjective, full noun	Kær vinur er gulli betri.	A dear friend is better than gold.
weak adjective, shortened noun	Kæri vin, segðu mér nú sögu.	Dear friend, tell me a story.

==== Norwegian ====
Nouns in Norwegian are not inflected for the vocative case, but adjectives qualifying those nouns are; adjectival adjuncts modifying vocative nouns are inflected for the definite (see: Norwegian language#Adjectives). The definite and plural inflections are in most cases identical, so it is more easily observable with adjectives that inflect for plural and definite differently, e.g. liten being lille when definite, but små when plural, an instance of suppletion.

Non-vocative	Vocative	English translation
kjær venn	kjære venn	dear friend
vis mann	vise mann	wise man
liten katt	lille katt	little cat

In several Norwegian dialects, north of an isogloss running from Oslo to Bergen, names in argument position are associated with proprial articles, e.g. gendered pronouns such as han 'he' or hun 'she', which either precede or follow the noun in question. This is not the case when in vocative constructions.

=== Greek ===
In Ancient Greek, the vocative case is usually identical to the nominative case, with the exception of first-declension masculine nouns (ending in -ας or -ης), second-declension non-neuter nouns (ending in -ος) and third-declension non-neuter nouns.

In the first declension, masculines in -ᾱς have the vocative in -ᾱ (νεᾱνίᾱ); those in -της have -ᾰ (πολῖτα), all others in -ης have -η (Ἀτρείδη) except names of nations and compounds: Πέρσᾰ, Σκύθᾰ, γεω-μέτρᾰ, παιδο-τρίβᾰ. Δεσπότης has a recessive accent vocative δέσποτα. Second-declension masculine and feminine nouns have a regular vocative ending in -ε. Third-declension nouns with one syllable ending in -ς have a vocative that is identical to the nominative (νύξ, night); otherwise, the stem (with necessary alterations, such as dropping final consonants) serves as the vocative (nom. πόλις, voc. πόλι; nom. σῶμα, gen. σώματος, voc. σῶμα). Irregular vocatives exist as well, such as nom. Σωκράτης, voc. Σώκρατες.

In Modern Greek, second-declension masculine nouns still have a vocative ending in -ε. However, the accusative case is often used as a vocative in informal speech for a limited number of nouns, and always used for certain modern Greek person names: "Έλα εδώ, Χρήστο" "Come here, Christos" instead of "...Χρήστε". Other nominal declensions use the same form in the vocative as the accusative in formal or informal speech, with the exception of learned Katharevousa forms that are inherited from Ancient Greek Ἕλλην (Demotic Έλληνας, "Greek man"), which have the same nominative and vocative forms instead.

=== Iranian languages ===
==== Kurdish ====
Kurdish has a vocative case. For instance, in the dialect of Kurmanji, it is created by adding the suffix -o at the end of masculine words and the -ê suffix at the end of feminine ones. In the Jafi dialect of Sorani it is created by adding the suffix of -i at the end of names.

Kurmanji		Jafi	
Name	Vocative	Name	Vocative
Sedad (m)	Sedo	Bêstûn	Bêsi
Wedad (m)	Wedo	Reşîd	Reşo
Baran (m)	Baro	Sûret	Sûri
Nazdar (f)	Nazê	Fatime	Fati
Gulistan (f)	Gulê	Firset	Firsi
Berfîn (f)	Berfê	Nesret	Nesi

Instead of the vocative case, forms of address may be created by using the grammatical particles lê (feminine) and lo (masculine):

Name	Vocative
Nazdar (f)	Lê Nazê!
Diyar (m)	Lo Diyar!

=== Indo-Aryan languages ===
==== Hindi-Urdu ====
In Hindi-Urdu (Hindustani), the vocative form is identical with the oblique, except that in the plural, ओं loses its nasalization. Adjectives in Hindi-Urdu also have a vocative case form. In the absence of a noun argument, some adjectives decline like masculine nouns that do not end in आ /aː/ ā.

Noun Classes		Singular			Plural			English
Noun Classes		Nominative	Oblique	Vocative	Nominative	Oblique	Vocative	English
Masculine	ending in आ ā	लड़का laṛkā	लड़के laṛke			लड़कों laṛkõ	लड़को laṛko	boy
Masculine	not ending in आ ā	इंसान insān				इंसानों insānõ	इंसानो insāno	human
Feminine	ending in ई ī	लड़की laṛkī			लड़कियाँ laṛkiyā̃	लड़कियों laṛkiyõ	लड़कियो laṛkiyo	girl
Feminine	not ending in ई ī	माँ mātā			माताएँ mātāẽ	माताओं mātāõ	माताओ mātāo	mother
Feminine	not ending in ई ī	चिड़िया ciṛiyā			चिड़ियाँ ciṛiyā̃	चिड़ियों ciṛiyõ	चिड़ियो ciṛiyo	bird

Adjective Classes			Singular		Plural		English
Adjective Classes			Nominative	Vocative	Nominative	Vocative	English
Declinable	masculine		बुरा burā	बुरे bure			bad
Declinable	feminine		बुरी burī				bad
Undeclinable (not ending in -ā or -ī in nominative singular)	masculine	with noun	बेवकूफ़ bevakūf				fool
Undeclinable (not ending in -ā or -ī in nominative singular)	feminine	with noun	बेवकूफ़ bevakūf				fool
Undeclinable (not ending in -ā or -ī in nominative singular)	masculine	sans noun	बेवक़ूफ़ bevaqūf			बेवकूफ़ो bevakūfo	fool
Undeclinable (not ending in -ā or -ī in nominative singular)	feminine	sans noun	बेवक़ूफ़ bevaqūf			बेवकूफ़ो bevakūfo	fool

==== Sanskrit ====
In Sanskrit, the vocative (सम्बोधन विभक्ति sambodhana vibhakti) is morphologically distinct from the nominative only in the singular. In vowel-stem nouns, if there is a -ḥ in the nominative, it is omitted and the stem vowel may be altered: -ā and -ĭ become -e, -ŭ becomes -o, -ī and -ū become short and -ṛ becomes -ar. Consonant-stem nouns have no ending in the vocative:

Noun	Singular	Dual	Plural
बाल (bāla, masc., 'boy')	हे बाल he bāla	हे बालौ he bālau	हे बालाः he bālāḥ
लता (latā, fem., 'creeper')	हे लते he late	हे लते he late	हे लताः he latāḥ
फल (phala, neut., 'fruit')	हे फल he phala	हे फले he phale	हे फलानि he phalāni

=== Slavic languages ===
==== Old Church Slavonic ====
Old Church Slavonic has a distinct vocative case for many stems of singular masculine and feminine nouns, otherwise it is identical to the nominative. When different from the nominative, the vocative is simply formed from the nominative by appending either -e (rabŭ : rabe 'slave') or -o (ryba : rybo 'fish'), but occasionally -u (krai : kraju 'border', synŭ : synu 'son', vračĭ : vraču 'physician') and '-i' (kostĭ : kosti 'bone', gostĭ : gosti 'guest', dĭnĭ : dĭni 'day', kamy : kameni 'stone') appear. Nouns ending with -ĭcĭ have a vocative ending of -če (otĭcĭ : otĭče 'father', kupĭcĭ : kupĭče 'merchant'), likewise nouns ending with -dzĭ assume the vocative suffix -že (kŭnědzĭ : kŭněže 'prince'). This is similar to Greek, Latin, Lithuanian, and Sanskrit, which also employ the -e suffix in vocatives.

==== Bulgarian ====
Unlike most other Slavic languages, Bulgarian has lost case marking for nouns. However, Bulgarian preserves vocative forms. Traditional male names usually have a vocative ending.

Nominative	Vocative
Петър Petar	Петре Petre
Тодор Todor	Тодоре Todore
Иван Ivan	Иване Ivane

More recent names and foreign names may have a vocative form but it is rarely used (Ричарде, instead of simply Ричард Richard, sounds unusual or humorous to native speakers).

Vocative phrases like господине министре (Mr. Minister) have been almost completely replaced by nominative forms, especially in official writing. Proper nouns usually also have vocative forms, but they are used less frequently. Here are some proper nouns that are frequently used in vocative:

English word	Nominative	Vocative
God	Бог Bog	Боже Bozhe
Lord	Господ Gospod	Господи Gospodi
Jesus Christ	Исус Христос Isus Hristos	Исусе Христе Isuse Hriste
comrade	другар drugar	другарю drugaryu
priest	поп pop	попе pope
frog	жаба zhaba	жабо zhabo
fool	глупак glupak	глупако glupako

Vocative case forms also normally exist for female given names:

Nominative	Vocative
Елена Elena	Елено Eleno
Пена Pena	Пено Peno
Елица Elitsa	Елице Elitse
Радка Radka	Радке Radke

Except for forms that end in -е, they can be considered rude and are often avoided, especially in some regions of Bulgaria. For female kinship terms, the vocative is always used:

English word	Nominative	Vocative
Grandmother	Баба Baba	Бабо Babo
Mom	Майка Mayka; Мама Mama	Майко Mayko; Мамо Mamo
Aunt	Леля Lelya	Лельо Lelyo
Sister	Сестра Sestra	Сестро Sestro

==== Czech ====
In Czech, the vocative (vokativ, or 5. pád – 'the fifth case') usually differs from the nominative in masculine and feminine nouns in the singular.

Nominative case	Vocative case	Gloss
Feminine
paní Eva	paní Evo!	'Ms Eve'
knížka	knížko!	'little book'
Marie	Marie!	'Mary'
nová píseň	nová písni!	'new song'
Masculine
pan profesor	pane profesore!	'Mr Professor'
Ježíš	Ježíši!	'Jesus'
Marek	Marku!	'Mark'
předseda	předsedo!	'chairman'
pan žalobce	pane žalobce!	'Mr complainant'
blbec	blbče!	'dunce'
Jiří	Jiří!	'George'
pan Dobrý	pane Dobrý!	'Mr Good'
Neuter
moje rodné město	moje rodné město!	'my native city'
jitřní moře	jitřní moře!	'morning sea'
otcovo obydlí	otcovo obydlí!	'father's dwelling'

It is a common dialectal feature of Czech to use the nominative with female names (Lojzka, dej pokoj!) or when following a title (pane učitel!, pane továrník!, pane Novák!). It is particularly prevalent in regional dialects, such as those of Moravia, where it has been the only form in use for hundreds of years.

The full vocative remains part of the official standard propagated by the Czech government. In the Czech Republic and elsewhere in eastern Europe, language competence is often conflated with adherence to official norms, and the use of the nominative - while common - may therefore be stigmatised.

==== Polish ====
In Polish, the vocative (wołacz) is formed with feminine nouns usually taking -o except those where the last consonant is soft e.g. -sia, -cia, -nia, and -dzia, which take -u. Feminine nouns that end with -i, usually in the suffixes -ini and -yni, as well as feminine nouns that end with a soft consonant, usually words with the suffix -(o)ść, but also irregular words like sól take the ending -i. Feminine nouns that end with a hardened consonant e.g. noc take the ending -y. Masculine nouns generally follow the complex pattern of the locative case, with the exception of a handful of words such as Bóg → Boże 'God', ojciec → ojcze 'father' and chłopiec → chłopcze 'boy'. Neuter nouns and all plural nouns have the same form in the nominative and the vocative:

Nominative case	Vocative case	Gloss
Feminine
Pani Ewa	Pani Ewo!	'Mrs Eve'
Ewusia	Ewusiu!	'diminutive form of Ewa'
ciemność	ciemności!	'darkness'
książka	książko!	'book'
Masculine
Pan profesor	Panie profesorze!	'Mr. Professor'
Krzysztof	Krzysztofie!	'Christopher!'
Krzyś	Krzysiu!	'Chris'
wilk	wilku!	'wolf'
człowiek	człowieku! człowiecze! (poetic)	'human'

The latter form of the vocative of człowiek 'human' is now considered poetical.

The nominative is increasingly used instead of the vocative to address people with their proper names. In other contexts the vocative remains prevalent. It is used:

- To address an individual with the function, title, other attribute, family role
  - Panie doktorze (Doctor!), Panie prezesie! (Chairman!)
  - Przybywasz za późno, pływaku (You arrive too late, swimmer)
  - synu (son), mamo (mum), tato (dad)
- After adjectives, demonstrative pronouns and possessive pronouns
  - Nie rozumiesz mnie, moja droga Basiu! (You don't understand me, my dear Basia!)
- To address an individual in an offensive or condescending manner:
  - Zamknij się, pajacu! ("Shut up, you buffoon!")
  - Co się gapisz, idioto? ("What are you staring at, idiot?")
  - Nie znasz się, baranie, to nie pisz! ("Stop writing, idiot, you don't know what you're doing!")
  - Spadaj, wieśniaku! ("Get lost, hillbilly!")
- After "Ty" (second person singular pronoun)
  - Ty kłamczuchu! (You liar!)
- Set expressions:
  - (O) Matko!, (O) Boże!, chłopie

The vocative is also often employed in affectionate and endearing contexts such as Kocham Cię, Krzysiu! ("I love you, Chris!") or Tęsknię za Tobą, moja Żono ("I miss you, my wife."). In addition, the vocative form sometimes takes the place of the nominative in informal conversations: Józiu przyszedł instead of Józio przyszedł ("Joey's arrived"). When referring to someone by their first name, the nominative commonly takes the place of the vocative as well: Ania, chodź tu! instead of Aniu, chodź tu! ("Anne, come here!").

==== Russian ====
===== Historic vocative =====
The historic Slavic vocative has been lost in Russian and is now used only in archaic expressions. Several of them, mostly of Old Church Slavonic origin, are common in colloquial Russian: "Боже!" (Bože, vocative of "Бог" Bog, "God") and "Боже мой!" (Bože moj, "My God!"), and "Господи!" (Gospodi, vocative of "Господь" Gospodj, "Lord"), which can also be expressed as "Господи Иисусе!" (Gospodi Iisuse!, Iisuse vocative of "Иисус" Iisus, "Jesus"). The vocative is also used in prayers: "Отче наш!" (Otče naš, "Our Father!"), or the Russian version of the Jesus Prayer ("Господи Иисусе Христе"). Such expressions are used to express strong emotions (much like English "O my God!"), and are often combined ("Господи, Боже мой"). More examples of the historic vocative can be found in other Biblical quotes that are sometimes used as proverbs: "Врачу, исцелися сам" (Vraču, iscelisia sam, "Physician, heal thyself", nom. "врач", vrač). Vocative forms are also used in modern Church Slavonic. The patriarch and bishops of the Russian Orthodox Church are addressed as "владыко" (vladyko, hegemon, nom. "владыка", vladyka). In the latter case, the vocative is often also incorrectly used for the nominative to refer to bishops and patriarchs. These Old Church Slavonic words that are present in the current Russian language are known as "fossil words".

===== New vocative =====
In modern colloquial Russian, given names and a small family of terms often take a special "shortened" form that some linguists consider to be a re-emerging vocative case. It is used only for given names and nouns that end in -a and -я, which are sometimes dropped in the vocative form: "Лен, где ты?" ("Lena, where are you?"). It is basically equivalent to "Лена, где ты?" but suggests a positive personal and emotional bond between the speaker and the person being addressed. Names that end in -я then acquire a soft sign: "Оль!" = "Оля!" ("Olga!"). In addition to given names, the form is often used with words like "мама" (mom) and "папа" (dad), which would be respectively shortened to "мам" and "пап". The plural form is used with words such as "ребят", "девчат" (nom: "ребята", "девчата" guys, gals).

Such usage differs from the historic vocative, which would be "Лено" and is not related.

==== Serbo-Croatian ====
In Serbo-Croatian languages, distinct vocatives exist only for singular masculine and feminine nouns. Nouns of the neuter gender and all nouns in plural have a vocative equal to the nominative. All vocative suffixes known from Old Church Slavonic also exist in Serbo-Croatian.

The vocative in Serbo-Croatian is formed according to one of three types of declension, which are classes of nouns with the same declension suffixes.

===== First declension =====
The first declension comprises masculine nouns that end with a consonant. These have a vocative suffix of either -e (doktor : doktore 'doctor') or -u (gospodar : gospodaru 'master').

Nouns terminating in -or have the -e vocative suffix: doktor : doktore 'doctor', major : majore 'major', majstor : majstore 'artisan', as well as nouns possessing an unsteady a: vetar : vetre 'wind', svekar : svekre 'father-in-law', and the noun car : care 'emperor'. All other nouns in this class form the vocative with -u: gospodar : gospodaru 'master', pastir : pastiru 'shepherd', inženjer : inženjeru 'engineer', pisar : pisaru 'scribe', sekretar : sekretaru 'secretary'.

In particular, masculine nouns ending with a palatal or prepalatal consonant j, lj, nj, č, dž, ć, đ or š form vocatives with the -u suffix: heroj : heroju 'hero', prijatelj : prijatelju 'friend', konj : konju 'horse', vozač : vozaču 'driver', mladić : mladiću 'youngster', kočijaš : kočijašu 'coachman', muž : mužu 'husband'.

Nouns ending with the velars -k, -g and -h are palatalized to -č, -ž, -š in the vocative: vojnik : vojniče 'soldier', drug : druže 'comrade', duh : duše 'ghost'. A final -c becomes -č in the vocative: stric : striče 'uncle', lovac : lovče 'hunter'. Likewise, a final -z becomes -ž in only two cases: knez : kneže 'prince' and vitez : viteže 'knight'.

The loss of the unsteady a can trigger a sound change by hardening consonants, as in vrabac : vrapče 'sparrow' (not *vrabče), lisac : lišče 'male fox' (not *lisče) and ženomrzac : ženomršče 'misogynist' (not *ženomrzče). There may be a loss of -t before -c like in otac : oče 'father' (instead of *otče), svetac : sveče 'saint' (instead of *svetče). When these phonetic alterations would substantially change the base noun, the vocative remains equal to the nominative, for example tetak 'uncle', mačak 'male cat', bratac 'cousin'. This also holds true for foreign names ending with -k, -g and -h like Džek 'Jack', Dag 'Doug', King, Hajnrih.

Male names ending with -o and -e have a vocative equal to the nominative, for example: Marko, Mihailo, Danilo, Đorđe, Pavle, Radoje.

===== Second declension =====
The second declension affects nouns with the ending -a. These are mainly of feminine but sometimes also of masculine gender. These nouns have a vocative suffix -o: riba : ribo 'fish', sluga : slugo 'servant', kolega : kolego 'colleague', poslovođa : poslovođo 'manager'.

Exemptions to this rule are male and female given names, which have a vocative equal to the nominative, e. g. Vera, Zorka, Olga, Marija, Gordana, Nataša, Nikola, Kosta, Ilija etc. However, this is different for twosyllabic names with an ascending accent such as female names Nâda, Zôra, Mîca, Nêna and male names Pêra, Bôža, Pâja, etc., which form vocatives with -o: Nâdo, Zôro, Mîco, Pêro, Bôžo, Pâjo, etc.

Denominations of relatives like mama 'mom', tata 'dad', baba 'grandmother', deda 'grandfather', tetka 'aunt' (parent's sister), ujna 'aunt' (mother's brother's wife), strina 'aunt' (father's brother's wife) have vocatives equal to the nominative. This also holds true for country names ending in -ska, -čka, -ška.

Nouns ending with the diminutive suffix -ica that consist of three or more syllables have a vocative with -e: učiteljica: učiteljice "female teacher", drugarica: drugarice "girlfriend", tatica: tatice "daddy", mamica: mamice "mommy". This also applies to female names Danica: Danice, Milica: Milice, Zorica: Zorice, and the male names Perica: Perice, Tomica: Tomice. Nouns of this class that can be applied to both males and females usually have a vocative ending of -ico (pijanica: pijanico "drunkard", izdajica: izdajico "traitor", kukavica: kukavico "coward"), but vocatives with -ice are also seen.

The use of vocative endings for names varies among Serbo-Croatian dialects. People in Croatia often use only nominative forms as vocatives, while others are more likely to use grammatical vocatives.

===== Third declension =====
The third declension affects feminine nouns ending with a consonant. The vocative is formed by appending the suffix -i to the nominative (reč : reči 'word', noć : noći 'night').

==== Slovak ====
Until the end of the 1980s, the existence of a distinct vocative case in Slovak was recognised and taught at schools. Today, the case is no longer considered to exist except for a few archaic examples of the original vocative remaining in religious, literary or ironic contexts:

Nominative	Vocative	Translation	Nominative	Vocative	Translation	Nominative	Vocative	Translation
Boh m.	Bože	God	Ježiš m.	Ježišu	Jesus	mama f.	mamo	mother
Kristus m.	Kriste	Christ	priateľ m.	priateľu	friend	žena f.	ženo	woman
pán m.	pane	lord	brat m.	bratu, bratku	brother			
otec m.	otče	father	syn m.	synu, synku	son			
človek m.	človeče	man, human						
chlap m.	chlape	man						
chlapec m.	chlapče	boy						

In everyday use, the Czech vocative is sometimes retrofitted to certain words:

Nominative	Vocative	Translation
majster m.	majstre	maestro
šéf m.	šéfe	boss
švagor m.	švagre	brother-in-law

Another stamp of vernacular vocative is emerging, presumably under the influence of Hungarian for certain family members or proper names:

Nominative	Vocative	Translation
otec m.	oci	father
mama f.	mami	mother
babka f.	babi	grandmother, old woman
Paľo m.	Pali	Paul, domestic form
Zuza f.	Zuzi	Susan, domestic form

==== Ukrainian ====
Ukrainian has retained the vocative case mostly as it was in Proto-Slavic:

Masculine nouns			Feminine nouns		
Nominative	Vocative	Translation	Nominative	Vocative	Translation
бог boh	боже bože	god	матуся matusja	матусю matusju	minnie
друг druh	друже druže	friend	неня nenja	нене nene	nanny
брат brat	брате brate	brother	бабця babcja	бабцю babcju	granny
чоловік čolovik	чоловіче čoloviče	man	жінка žinka	жінко žinko	woman
хлопець chlopec'	хлопче chlopče	boy	дружина družyna	дружино družyno	wife
святий отець svjatyj otec'	святий отче svjatyj otče	Holy Father	дівчина divčyna	дівчино divčyno	girl
пан pan	пане pane	sir, Mr.	сестра sestra	сестро sestro	sister
приятель pryjatel'	приятелю pryjatelju	fellow	людина ljudyna	людино ljudyno	human, person
батько bat'ko	батьку bat'ku	father			
син syn	сину synu	son			

There are some exceptions:

Nominative	Vocative	Translation
мати maty f.	мамо mamo	mother
божа матір boža matir f.	матір божа matir boža	God's Mother

It is used even for loanwords and foreign names:

Nominative	Vocative	Translation
Джон Džon m.	Джоне Džone	John
пан президент pan prezydent m.	пане президенте pane prezydente	Mr. President

It is obligatory for all native names:

Masculine		Feminine	
Nominative	Vocative	Nominative	Vocative
Володимир Volodymyr	Володимире Volodymyre	Мирослава Myroslava	Мирославо Myroslavo
Святослав Svjatoslav	Святославе Svjatoslave	Ганна Hanna	Ганно Hanno

It is used for patronymics:

Nominative	Vocative
Андрій Васильович Andrij Vasylovyč m.	Андрію Васильовичу Andriju Vasyliovyču
Ірина Богданівна Iryna Bohdanivna f.	Ірино Богданівно Iryno Bohdanivno

=== Latin ===
"Et tu, Brute?" from Shakespeare's Julius Caesar, probably the most famous use of the vocative in literature.

In Latin, the form of the vocative case of a noun is almost always the same as the nominative. Exceptions include singular non-neuter second-declension nouns that end in -us in the nominative case. An example would be the famous line from Shakespeare, "Et tu, Brute?" (commonly translated as "And you, Brutus?"): Brute is the vocative case and Brutus would be the nominative.

Nouns that end in -ius end with -ī instead of the expected -ie. Thus, Julius becomes Julī and filius becomes filī. The shortening does not shift the accent so the vocative of Vergilius is Vergilī, with accent on the second syllable even though it is short. Nouns that end in -aius and -eius have vocatives that end in -aī or -eī even though the -i- in the nominative is consonantal.

First-declension and second-declension adjectives also have distinct vocative forms in the masculine singular if the nominative ends in -us, with the ending -e. Adjectives that end in -ius have vocatives in -ie so the vocative of eximius is eximie.

Nouns and adjectives that end in -eus do not follow the rules above. Meus forms the vocative irregularly as mī or meus, while Christian Deus does not have a distinct vocative and retains the form Deus. "My God!" in Latin is thus mī Deus!, but Jerome's Vulgate consistently used Deus meus as a vocative. Classical Latin did not use a vocative of deus either, preferring to use the name of the god (and in reference to pagan gods, the Romans used the suppletive form dive).

Greek names in Latin texts conserve their Greek vocative form. E. g., the vocative of Andrēās is Andrēā.

=== Romance languages ===
==== West Iberian languages ====
Portuguese drops the article to form the vocative. The vocative is always between commas and, like in many other languages, a particle Ó is commonly used:

Ó Jesus, ajude-nos!	O Jesus, help us!
Menino, vem cá!	Boy, come here!
Não faças isso, amigo.	Don't do that, [my] friend.

In Extremaduran and Fala, some post-tonical vowels open in vocative forms of nouns, a new development that is unrelated to the Latin vocative case.

==== Catalan ====
Catalan drops the article to form the vocative.

==== French ====
Like English, French sometimes uses (or historically used) a particle Ô to mark vocative phrases rather than by change to the form of the noun. A famous example is the title and first line of the Canadian national anthem, O Canada (French title: Ô Canada), a vocative phrase addressing Canada.

==== Romanian ====
The vocative case in Romanian is partly inherited, occasionally causing other morphophonemic changes (see also the article on Romanian nouns):

- singular masculine/neuter: -e as in
  - om: omule! (man, human being),
  - băiat: băiete! or băiatule! (boy),
  - văr: vere! (cousin),
  - Ion: Ioane! (John);
- singular feminine: -o as in
  - soră: soro! (sister),
  - nebună: nebuno! (mad woman), also in masculine (nebunul)
  - deșteaptă: deșteapto! (smart one (f), often used sarcastically),
  - Ileana: Ileano! (Helen);

Since there is no -o vocative in Latin, it must have been borrowed from Slavic: compare the corresponding Bulgarian forms сестро (sestro), откачалко (otkachalko), Елено (Eleno).

- plural, all genders: -lor as in
  - frați: fraților! (brothers),
  - boi: boilor! (oxen, used toward people as an invective),
  - doamne și domni: doamnelor și domnilor! (ladies and gentlemen).

In formal speech, the vocative often simply copies the nominative/accusative form even when it does have its own form. That is because the vocative is often perceived as very direct and so can seem rude.

==== Romanesco dialect ====
In Romanesco dialect the vocative case appears as a regular truncation immediately after the stress.

Compare (vocative, always truncated)

France', vie' qua!

"Francesco/Francesca, come here!"

with (nominative, never truncated)

Francesco/Francesca viene qua

"Francesco/Francesca comes here"

==== Venetian ====
Venetian has lost all case endings, like most other Romance languages. However, with feminine proper names the role of the vocative is played by the absence of the determiner: the personal article ła / l' usually precedes feminine names in other situations, even in predicates. Masculine names and other nouns lack articles and so rely on prosody to mark forms of address:

Case	Fem. proper name	Masc. proper name and other nouns
Nom./Acc.	ła Marìa ła vien qua / varda ła Marìa! 'Mary comes here / look at Mary!'	Marco el vien qua / varda Marco! 'Mark comes here / look at Mark!'
Vocative	Marìa vien qua! / varda, Marìa! 'Mary, come here! / look, Mary!'	Marco vien qua! / varda, Marco! 'Mark, come here! / look, Mark!'

Predicative constructions:

Case	Fem. proper name	Masc. proper name and other nouns
Pred.	so' mi ła Marìa 'I am Mary.'	so' mi Marco / so' tornà maestra 'I am Mark. / I am a teacher again.'
Vocative	so' mi Marìa! 'It's me, Mary!'	so' mi, Marco! / so' tornà, maestra! 'It's me, Mark! / I am back, teacher!'

== Arabic ==
Properly speaking, Arabic has only three cases: nominative, accusative and genitive. However, a meaning similar to that conveyed by the vocative case in other languages is indicated by the use of the particle yā (Arabic: يا) placed before a noun inflected in the nominative case (or accusative if the noun is in construct form). In English translations, it is often translated literally as O instead of being omitted. A longer form used in Classical Arabic is أيّها ayyuhā (masculine), أيّتها ayyatuhā (feminine), sometimes combined with yā. The particle yā was also used in the old Castilian language because of Arabic influence via Mozarabic immigrations.

== Mandarin ==
Mandarin uses no special inflected forms for address. However, special forms and morphemes (that are not inflections) exist for addressing.

Mandarin has several particles that can be attached to the word of address to mark certain special vocative forces, where appropriate. A common one is 啊(Chinese: 啊; pinyin: a) attached to the end of the address word. For example, 日记(Chinese: 日记; pinyin: Rìjì) "diary" becomes 日记啊 (Chinese: 日记啊; pinyin: Rìjì a).

Certain specialized vocative morphemes also exist, albeit with limited applicabilities. For instance, the Beijing dialect of Mandarin Chinese, to express strong feelings (especially negative ones) to someone, a neutral tone suffix -ei may be attached to certain address words. It is most commonly applied to the word 孙子 (sūnzi, "grandson"), to form sūnzei, meaning approximately "Hey you nasty one!". Another example is 小子 (xiǎozi, lit. "kid; young one"), resulting in xiǎozei "Hey kiddo!".

== Japanese ==
The vocative case is present in Japanese as the particle よ. This usage is often literary or poetic. For example:

雨よ雪に変わってくれ！ Ame yo yuki ni kawatte kure!	O Rain! Please change to snow!
万国の労働者よ、団結せよ！ Bankoku no rōdō-sha yo, danketsu seyo!	Workers of the world, unite!
少年よ、神話になれ！ Shōnen yo, shinwa ni nare!	Young boy, become a legend!

In conversational Japanese, this same particle is often used at the end of a sentence to indicate assertiveness, certainty or emphasis.

== Georgian ==
In Georgian, the vocative case is used to address the second-person singular and plural. For word roots that end with a consonant, the vocative case suffix is -o, and for the words that end with a vowel, it is -v like in Old Georgian, but for some words, it is considered archaic. For example, k’ats- is the root for the word "man". If one addresses someone with the word, it becomes k’atso.

Adjectives are also declined in the vocative case. Just like nouns, consonant final stem adjectives take the suffix -o in the vocative case, and the vowel final stems are not changed:

lamazi kali "beautiful woman" (nominative case)
lamazo kalo! "beautiful woman!" (vocative case)

In the second phrase, both the adjective and the noun are declined. The personal pronouns are also used in the vocative case. Shen "you" (singular) and tkven "you" (plural) in the vocative case become she! and tkve, without the -n. Therefore, one could, for instance, say, with the declension of all of the elements:

She lamazo kalo! "you beautiful woman!"

== Korean ==
The vocative case in Korean is commonly used with first names in casual situations by using the vocative case marker (호격 조사) 아 (a) if the name ends in a consonant and 야 (ya) if the name ends with a vowel:

미진이 집에 가?
Mijini jibe ga?
Is Mijin going home?

미진아, 집에 가?
Mijina, jibe ga?
Mijin, are you going home?

동배 뭐 해?
Dongbae mwo hae?
What is Dongbae doing?

동배야, 뭐 해?
Dongbaeya, mwo hae?
Dongbae, what are you doing?

In formal Korean, the marker 여 (yeo) or 이여 (iyeo) is used, the latter if the root ends with a consonant. Thus, a quotation of William S. Clark would be translated as follows:

소년이여, 야망을 가져라.
sonyeoniyeo, yamangeul gajyeora.
Boys, be ambitious.

The honorific infix 시 (si) is inserted in between the 이 (i) and 여 (yeo).

신이시여, 부디 저들을 용서하소서.
sinisiyeo, budi jeodeureul yongseohasoseo.
Oh god, please forgive them.

In Middle Korean, there were three honorific classes of the vocative case:

Form	하	아/야	여/이여
Honorific	High	Plain	Low with added nuance of exclamation

== Hungarian ==
Hungarian has a number of vocative-like constructions, even though it lacks an explicit vocative inflection.

Noun phrases in a vocative context always take the zero article. While noun phrases can take zero articles for other reasons, the lack of an article otherwise expected marks a vocative construction. This is especially prominent in dialects of Hungarian where personal proper names and other personal animate nouns tend to take the appropriate definite article, similarly to certain dialects of German detailed above. For example:

Nominative	Vocative
(Az) Olivér még beszélget. Oliver is still chatting.	Olivér, gyere ide! Oliver, come over here.
Kiönthette voln’ a honfi megtelt szívét. Might have pour'd the full tide of a patriot's heart.	Honfi, mit ér epedő kebel e romok ormán? Patriot, why do you yearn on these ruins?
A szerelem csodaszép. Love is wonderful.	Látod, szerelem, mit tettél! O Love, look what you have done!
(Az) Isten szerelmére! For the love of God!	Isten, áldd meg a magyart! God, bless the Hungarians!

With certain words such as barát ("friend"), hölgy ("lady"), úr ("gentleman, lord"), vocation is, in addition to the zero article, always marked by the first person possessive:

Nominative	Vocative
A nemesek báljára megérkeztek a hölgyek és az urak. The ladies and the gentlemen have arrived to the nobility's ball.	Hölgyeim és uraim, kezdődjék a tánc! (My) Ladies and (my) gentlemen, let the dancing begin!
Ha az Úr nem építi a házat, hiába fáradoznak az építők. Unless the Lord builds the house, its builders labor in vain.	Magasztallak Uram, felemeltél engem! I will exalt you, O (my) Lord, for you lifted me out of the depth!
A barát mindig segít. A friend always helps out. A barátom fiatal. My friend is young.	Tudnál segíteni, barátom? Could you help out, (my) friend?

Words like testvér ("sibling, brother") and other words of relation do not require the first person possessive, but it is readily used in common speech, especially in familiar contexts:

Nominative	Vocative
A testvérek elsétáltak a boltba. The siblings walked to the shop.	Kedves testvéreim! / Kedves testvérek! (My) dear brothers (and sisters)!
(Az) apához megyek. I'm going to dad.	Apám, hogy vagy? / Apa, hogy vagy? Dad, how are you?

The second-person pronoun can be used to emphasize a vocation when appropriate: Hát miért nem adtad oda neki, te bolond? ("Why did you not give it to him, you fool?"), Te Karcsi, nem láttad a szemüvegem? ("Charlie, have you seen my glasses?"), Lógtok ezért még, ti gazemberek. ("You shall yet hang for this, crooks!"), etc.
