= Richard Edes =

English churchman

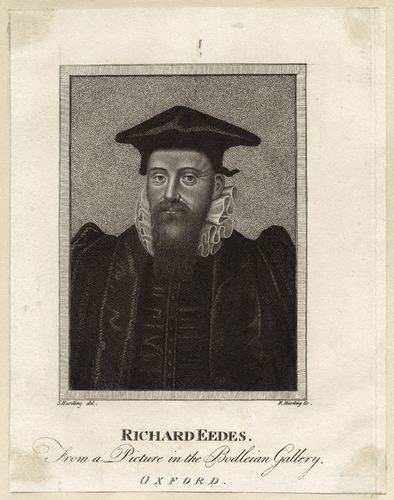
- Early 19th century engraving of an earlier portrait
- Born: 1555
- Died: 1604 (aged 48–49); Worcester
- Education: Christ Church, Oxford
- Occupation: Clergyman
- Spouse: Margaret Westphalian

Richard Edes (or Eedes) 1554–1604) was an Anglican English churchman and writer. He became Dean of Worcester, and was nominated one of the translators for the Authorised King James Version, in the Second Oxford Company, but died in the earliest stages of the project.

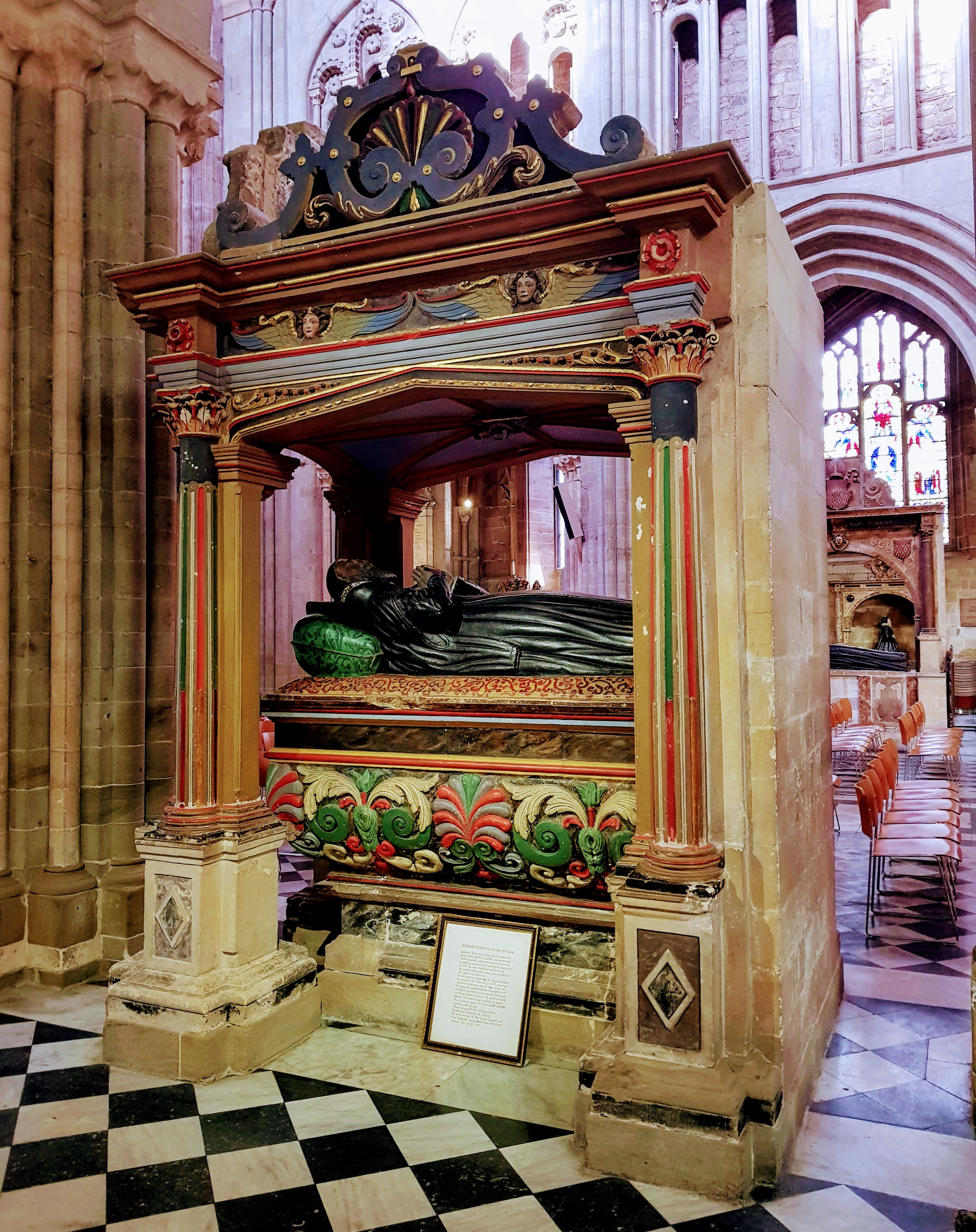
Monument in Worcester Cathedral to Richard Edes

== Life ==
He was born in Newport to Lawrence and Alice Edes and was baptised on 23 January 1554. He was educated at Westminster School, and was elected student of Christ Church, Oxford in 1571. There he proceeded B.A. 17 December 1574, and M.A. 2 May 1578. Taking orders he was a noted preacher. He was elected university proctor 10 April 1583, proceeded B.D. 6 July 1584, and D.D. 6 July 1590.

In favour at court, he had rapid preferment, with prebends at Salisbury (1584), Christ Church (1586), and Hereford (1590). He was made treasurer of Hereford Cathedral in 1596. In the same year he was appointed as chaplain to Queen Elizabeth I. On 19 June 1597 he became Dean of Worcester. He was presented to the rectory of Upton-upon-Severn, Worcestershire, 21 December 1598.

King James I, whose chaplain he became, appointed him one of the 54 translators who were to create the King James Version of the Bible. He was one of those divines who assembled at Oxford; but he did not live to see the undertaking. He died at Worcester on 19 November 1604. He was buried in the chapel at the east end of the cathedral choir. His widow, Margaret erected a monument with a punning epitaph.

== Family ==
Richard Edes married Margaret Westfaling, daughter of Herbert Westfaling, bishop of Hereford; they had at least two children, Margaret and Tobyas.

== Works ==
He was the reputed author of Julius Caesar (Caesar Interfectus), a Latin tragedy acted at Christ Church in 1582, which has been lost apart from a possible epilogue.

He also wrote poetry. A journey north with his friend Toby Mathew prompted Latin verse. He published Iter Boreale in 1584. He also left various other Latin and English poems, scattered through several manuscript collections of the poetry of his day, and William Gager addressed verse to him.

He contributed to the Exequiae Illustrissimi Equitis D. Philippi Sidnaei, Gratissimae Memoriae ac Nomini Impensae.

Anthony Wood called him "a most noted and celebrated preacher" and his work was noted in Francis Meres' 1598 book, The Wits Commonwealth.

He published several sermons, including Six Learned and Godly Sermons, London, 1604, and Three Sermons, London, 1627.
