= List of language creators =

List of people

A language creator, sometimes referred to as a conlanger (/ˈkɒnlæŋər/), is a person who invents constructed languages (or "conlangs").

== Professional language creators ==
Individuals who have been hired to create languages.

- Victoria Fromkin - Paku (a.k.a. Pakuni)
- Paul Frommer - Na'vi, Barsoomian
- Madhan Karky - Kiliki
- Marc Okrand - Klingon, Vulcan, Atlantean
- Matt Pearson - Thhtmaa
- David J. Peterson - Dothraki, Valyrian, Chakobsa, Suh Ankripton, Ts'íts'àsh, Aazh Naamori, Ravkan, Fjerdan, Shu, Zemeni, Méníshè, Kastithanu (Castithan), L'Irathi (Irathient), Indojisnen, Sondiv, Shiväisith, Lishepus, Trigedasleng, Noalath, Inha, Munja'kin
- Jessie Peterson - Chakobsa, Suh Ankripton, Ts'íts'àsh, Aazh Naamori, Ravkan, Shu, Zemeni, Méníshè
- John H. G. Scott - Baldung (for Archive 81)
- Britton Watkins - Yautja (for Predator: Badlands)
- Wolf Wikeley - Tho Fan

== Published international auxiliary language creators ==
Individuals who have created languages intended for international communication.

- George Boeree: Lingua Franca Nova
- Louis Couturat and Louis de Beaufront: Ido language
- Alexander Gode: Interlingua
- Lancelot Hogben: Interglossa
- Otto Jespersen: Novial
- Francis Lodwick: Common Writing
- Jackson Moore: Moss
- François Sudre: Solresol
- Charles Kay Ogden: Basic English
- Giuseppe Peano: Latino sine flexione
- Waldemar Rosenberger: Idiom Neutral
- Johann Martin Schleyer: Volapük
- Kenneth Searight: Sona
- Edgar de Wahl: Interlingue
- John Wilkins: unnamed universal language
- L. L. Zamenhof: Esperanto

== Published zonal auxiliary language creators ==
Individuals who have created zonal auxiliary languages intended to facilitate communication speakers of a certain group of closely related languages.

- Jan van Steenbergen: Interslavic
- Juraj Križanić
- Ján Herkeľ: Universalis Lingua Slavica

== Published fictional language creators ==
Language creators whose work has been published in books or other media that they created:

- Richard Adams: Lapine, in Watership Down
- M.A.R. Barker: Tsolyáni for Tékumel
- Hector Berlioz
- Marion Zimmer Bradley
- Anthony Burgess: Nadsat in A Clockwork Orange and a prehistoric language in Quest for Fire.
- Samuel R. Delany
- Suzette Doctolero: Enchanta from the Encantadia Saga.
- Diane Duane
- Suzette Haden Elgin: Láadan, in the Native Tongue series
- Václav Havel
- Frank Herbert
- Hergé
- Robert Jordan: The Old Tongue in The Wheel of Time
- Ursula K. Le Guin
- Barry B. Longyear
- George Orwell: Newspeak, in Nineteen Eighty-Four
- Christopher Paolini: The Ancient Language in the Inheritance Cycle (Eragon and its sequels)
- Lynne Sharon Schwartz: in The Writing on the Wall
- J. R. R. Tolkien: more than twenty languages including Quenya, Sindarin, Khuzdul; see Languages constructed by J. R. R. Tolkien
- Karen Traviss: Mando'a in the Star Wars expanded universe
- Christian Vander
- Tad Williams: Higher Singing in Tailchaser's Song
- Gene Wolfe: Ascian in The Book of the New Sun

== Published engineered language creators ==
- Sonja Lang: Toki Pona, a minimalist language which has gained a large following and several publications over the years since its creation in 2001.
- James Cooke Brown: Loglan

== See also ==
- Category:Constructed language creators ( 94 )
