= Conlanging: The Art of Crafting Tongues =

- DVD cover
- Directed by: Britton Watkins
- Cinematography: Josh Feldman
- Edited by: Josh Feldman
- Release date: 24 August 2017
- Running time: 92 mins
- Country: United States
- Language: English

Conlanging: The Art of Crafting Tongues is a 2017 documentary film about conlanging – the hobby of constructing artificial languages and the people who make them. The film features conlangers David J. Peterson (Dothraki and High Valyrian from Game of Thrones), Marc Okrand (Klingon from Star Trek) and David Salo (consultant on Tolkien's languages, particularly Sindarin, for Peter Jackson's The Lord of the Rings and The Hobbit movies), as well as Paul Frommer, linguistics professor and creator of Na'vi, and Christine Schreyer (Kryptonian from Man of Steel), anthropologist at the University of British Columbia, who hopes to be able to apply conlanging methods to endangered languages. The film also looks at the history of the hobby and modern-day conlangers. While the film was made available for online purchase in 24 August, a premiere was held on 22 July at the University of Calgary's Plaza Theatre. Production began in 2015, and received funding from the Social Sciences and Humanities Research Council of Canada, but the film's future was secured through an Indiegogo campaign that raised $25,000 during August 2016. The Language Creation Society provided $3,000 worth of funds towards the film and held an interview with Watkins.

== See also ==
- Constructed language
- List of constructed languages
- Interlinguistics
