= Fictional language =

Constructed languages created for a fictional setting

Fictional languages are the subset of constructed languages (conlangs) that have been created as part of a fictional setting (e.g. for use in a book, movie, television show, or video game). Typically they are the creation of one individual, while natural languages evolve out of a particular culture or people group, and other conlangs may have group involvement. Fictional languages are also distinct from natural languages in that they have no native speakers. By contrast, the constructed language of Esperanto now has native speakers.

Fictional languages are intended to be the languages of a fictional world and are often designed with the intent of giving more depth, and an appearance of plausibility, to the fictional worlds with which they are associated. The goal of the author may be to have their characters communicate in a fashion which is both alien and dislocated. Within their fictional world, these languages do function as natural languages, helping to identify certain races or people groups and set them apart from others.

While some less-formed fictional languages are created as distorted versions or dialects of a pre-existing natural language, many are independently designed conlangs with their own lexicon (some more robust than others) and rules of grammar. Some of the latter are fully formed enough to be learned as a speakable language, and many subcultures exist of those who are 'fluent' in one or more of these fictional languages. Often after the creator of a fictional language has accomplished their task, the fandom of that fictional universe will pick up where the creator left off and continue to flesh out the language, making it more like a natural language and therefore more usable.

== Purpose ==
Fictional languages are separated from artistic languages by both purpose and relative completion: a fictional language often has the least amount of grammar and vocabulary possible, and rarely extends beyond the absolutely necessary. At the same time, some others have developed languages in detail for their own sake, such as J. R. R. Tolkien's Quenya and Sindarin (two Elvish languages), Star Trek's Klingon language and Avatar's Na'vi language which exist as functioning, usable languages.

By analogy with the word "conlang", the term conworld is used to describe these fictional worlds, inhabited by fictional constructed cultures. The conworld influences vocabulary (what words the language will have for flora and fauna, articles of clothing, objects of technology, religious concepts, names of places and tribes, etc.), as well as influencing other factors such as pronouns, or how their cultures view the break-off points between colors or the gender and age of family members. Sound is also a directing factor, as creators seek to show their audience through phonology the type of race or people group to whom the language belongs.

== Commercial fictional languages ==
Commercial fictional languages are those languages created for use in various commercial media, such as:

Categories	X	X	X	X	X	X	Reference:
Books	The Lord of the Rings: Quenya and Sindarin	Game of Thrones' Dothrak					
Films	Avatar's Na'vi	Baahubali's Kiliki	Star Wars' Huttese and Mando'a	Harry Potter's Parceltounge			
Television	Land of the Lost's Paku	Star Trek's Klingon and Vulcan	Game of Thrones' Valyrian	the Ultra Series' Ultra Language	Futurama's alienise		
Video Games	Far Cry Primal's Wenja	The Ar Tonelico Series' Hymmnos.	Splatoon's inkling typeface	The Sims' Simlish	Skyrim's Dovahzul	Animal Crossing's Animalise	
Comics	The Adventures of Tintin's Bordurian and Syldavian	Nineteen-Eighty-Four's Newspeak	DC or Superman'sKryptonian				
Other	Furby's Furbish	Pingu's Penguinese	Minion's Minionise	Magma's Kobaïan			

While some languages are created purely from the desire of the creator, language creation can be a profession. In 1974, Victoria Fromkin was the first person hired to create a language (Land of the Lost's Paku). Since then, notable professional language creators have included Marc Okrand (Klingon), David Peterson (Dothraki and others in Game of Thrones), and Paul Frommer (Na'vi).

== Alien languages ==
Qapla' means 'success' in the Klingon language.

A notable subgenre of fictional languages are alien languages, the ones that are used or might be used by putative extraterrestrial life forms. Alien languages are subject of both science fiction and scientific research. Perhaps the most fully developed fictional alien language is the Klingon language of the Star Trek universe – a fully developed constructed language.

The problem of alien language has confronted generations of science fiction writers; some have created fictional languages for their characters to use, while others have circumvented the problem through translation devices or other fantastic technology. For example, the Star Trek universe makes use of a "universal translator", which explains why such different races, often meeting for the first time, are able to communicate with each other. Another more humorous example would be the Babel fish from The Hitchhiker's Guide to the Galaxy, an aurally-inserted fish that instantaneously translates alien speech to the speaker's native language.

While in many cases an alien language is but an element of a fictional reality, in a number of science fiction works the core of the plot involves linguistic and psychological problems of communication between various alien species.

=== Visual alien languages ===
Circular Gallifreyan from Doctor Who, an example of a visual language. The sentence translates to "Welcome to Wikipedia, the free encyclopedia that anyone can edit."

A further subgenre of alien languages are those that are visual, rather than auditory. Notable examples of this type are Sherman's Circular Gallifreyan from BBC's Doctor Who series and the heptapod's written language, which is distinct from their spoken language, from the 2016 film Arrival.

== Internet-based fictional languages ==
Internet-based fictional languages are hosted along with their "conworlds" on the internet, and based at these sites, becoming known to the world through the visitors to these sites. Verdurian, the language of Mark Rosenfelder's Verduria on the planet of Almea, is an Internet-based fictional language.

== See also ==
- List of fictional languages
- Constructed languages
- Languages in Star Wars
