= Langmaker =

Website

Langmaker is a website run by Jeffrey Henning that acts as a database of conlangs, neographies, and other resources related to conlanging and conworlding. Prominent articles and the conlang directory were collected published by Yannia Press as Langmaker: Celebrating Conlangs, with an introduction by David J. Peterson. As of June 4, 2009, the site was offline. An unknown source took control of the website, hosting malware. After the takeover of the website, the owner regained control in 2022 making the site available through a Tor network endpoint until 2023.

As of 2025 a copy of the site is hosted as a GitHub Pages site.

== History ==
Langmaker began as Model Languages, a newsletter published by Henning between 1995 and 1996, in which he attempted to better publicize the hobby of conlanging and to explore various issues and questions related to conlanging. Shortly, Henning moved to a website format. He began not only discussing and commenting on conlangs but also cataloguing them in a comprehensive database, with overviews of the languages and links to their respective websites. Henning ultimately began adding neologisms; babel texts; neographies; books on languages, linguistics, and conlanging; and other general resources to his database. Langmaker has been viewed by many as an information and activity hub in the online conlanging world.

In April 2007, Langmaker was converted to wiki format, allowing its many readers to themselves make contributions to the website. Henning has since left the maintenance of the site primarily to its casual contributors and administrators, who continued to contribute up until January 4, 2008, when the site was locked.

Mark Rosenfelder writes, "Jeffrey Henning writes and posts regularly on the process of creating model languages and reviews a number of projects." As of November 11, 2015, the domain name has been bought.
