= ZBB =

ZBB may refer to:

- Zero-based budgeting, a budgeting method
- Zac Brown Band, an American country music band
- Zompist Bulletin Board, a forum for constructed worlds and languages on Zompist.com
- Esbjerg station (IATA code), railway station in Esbjerg, Denmark
- ZBB, postal code for Żebbuġ, Gozo, Malta

== See also ==
- Boundary Bay Airport (ICAO code: CZBB) in British Columbia, Canada
- Beijing Xijiao Airport (IATA code: ZBBB), military airport in Beijing, China
