= Kiliki =

Kiliki may be,

- a statue used in the Festival of San Fermín#Giants and big-heads parade
- Kiliki language, a fictional language created for the 2015 Indian film Baahubali: The Beginning
