= Chakobsa (Dune) =

Fictional language

- Neo-Chakobsa
- Created by: Frank Herbert; David J. Peterson; Jessie Peterson
- Date: From the 1960s
- Setting and usage: Spoken by the Fremen on Arrakis in Dune
- Purpose: Constructed language: Artistic language; Fictional language; Chakobsa
- Writing system: Chakobsa syllabary

Language codes
- ISO 639-3: –

Chakobsa is a fictional language spoken by the Fremen in Frank Herbert's novel Dune (1965). The language was further developed by David and Jessie Peterson for the films Dune (2021) and Dune: Part Two (2024). Because of the substantial changes made by the Petersons, the language used in the films is sometimes referred to as Neo-Chakobsa.

== Development ==
=== Herbert's original language ===
Herbert took the name for his language from Chakobsa, a language spoken in the Caucasus. He may have learned of the language from Lesley Blanch's book The Sabres of Paradise (1960). Blanch described Chakobsa as a "mysterious tongue":

They laughed derisively, speaking among themselves in that mysterious tongue, Chakobsa, 'the Hunting Language', which the rulers and Princes used when they wished to converse in secret, and of which no more than a few words have been discovered.

The original language created by Herbert was strongly influenced by Arabic. The Fremen use at least eighty terms derived from Arabic, many of which are related to Islam. Words of Arabic origin include ayat ('signs'), burhan ('proof'), ijaz ('prophecy'), ilm ('theology'), istislah ('natural law'), and karama ('miracle').

=== Subsequent development ===
David Peterson worked on the Chakobsa language alone for the first film, but for the second film he collaborated with his wife, Jessie Peterson (formerly Sams).

For the films, the Petersons created a language that eschewed Arabic influence. David Peterson argued that Dune was set so far in the future that Arabic would have changed beyond recognition (as a result of natural language change): "The time depth of the Dune books makes the amount of recognizable Arabic that survived completely (and I mean COMPLETELY) impossible." One example is the Chakobsa phrase translated as 'Long live the fighters'. In Herbert's novel, the phrase is Ya hya chouhada, which is derived from an Arabic celebratory chant used during the Algerian war of independence. However, in the film Dune: Part Two, the phrase is Addaam reshii a-zaanta (lit. 'lives long to-the-fighters').

The decision to move the language away from its Arabic and Islamic roots was criticized by a number of commentators.

== Linguistic structure ==
=== Phonology and orthography ===
Chakobsa has five short vowels, three long vowels, and twenty-three consonants.

- Short vowels:
  - i /i/
  - e /e/
  - a /a/
  - o /o/
  - u /u/
- Long vowels:
  - ii /iː/
  - aa /aː/
  - uu /uː/
- Consonants:
  - b /b/
  - t /t/
  - d /d/
  - ch /tʃ/
  - j /dʒ/
  - k /k/
  - g /ɡ/
  - q /q/
  - ’ /ʔ/
  - f /f/
  - v /v/
  - th /θ/
  - dh /ð/
  - s /s/
  - z /z/
  - sh /ʃ/
  - h /h/
  - m /m/
  - n /n/
  - r /ɾ/
  - l /l/
  - w /w/
  - y /j/

The consonants /t/, /tʃ/, and /k/ are unaspirated.

In some environments, such as before /s/, /b/ is devoiced to [p].

Chakobsa has consonant gemination. This is indicated in the romanization by the doubling of the consonant. For the digraphs ⟨ch⟩, ⟨th⟩, ⟨dh⟩, and ⟨sh⟩, only the first letter is doubled.

In addition to the system of romanization, the Petersons created a Chakobsa syllabary.

=== Morphology and syntax ===
Chakobsa nouns have six cases: nominative, accusative, genitive, locative, allative, and ablative.

Adjectives typically follow the nouns they modify:

addaam reshii a-zaanta
adˈdaːm ˈreʃiː aˈzaːnta
lives long to-the-fighters
'Long live the fighters!'

Constituent order is verb–subject–object:

qaubaka kaalik akaa rii hurayi
ˈqaubaka ˈkaːlik aˈkaː riː ˈhuraji
warned-they mothers-your:PL you:PL about coming-my
'Your mothers warned you about my coming.'

Verbal inflection means the subject can be omitted:

zaihaash lek
ˈzaihaːʃ lek
drink-you:SG sand
'You're insane.'

Sometimes a prepositional phrase is used with the infinitive:

oma hiila ekker is-thanaha
ˈoma ˈhiːla ekˈker isˈθanaha
on-us to-collect water from-body-his
'We must get his body's water.'

There is no copula:

shaidish fizib
ˈʃaidiʃ ˈfizib
today day
'Today is the day.'

ho jedhii omaiz
ho dʒeˈðiː oˈmaiz
he fat too-much
'He's too fat.'

Negation is by the particle so:

kaah so is-reshma
kaah so isˈreʃma
they not from-desert
'They are not of the desert.'

so nifriyi jila a-noqchom
so ˈnifriji ˈdʒila aˈnoqtʃom
not can-I go to-south
'I can't go south.'

== See also ==
- Argot
- Constructed language
