= LCK =

LCK may refer to:

- Tyrosin-protein kinase Lck

== Transport stations and areas ==
- Rickenbacker International Airport, Columbus, Ohio (IATA airport code LCK)
- Lockwood railway station, England (National Rail station code LCK)
- Lai Chi Kok station, Hong Kong (MTR station code LCK)
- Lim Chu Kang, Singapore

== Gaming ==
- League of Legends Champions Korea, the top-level league for League of Legends competition in South Korea
- A shortened form of the word "Luck" used in many Role-playing games

== Other ==
- Louis C.K., stand-up comedian, writer, producer, director, and actor
- Language Construction Kit, a feature of the website Zompist.com
