= Chakobsa =

Northwest Caucasian language

- Shikwoshir
- Region: North Caucasus
- Ethnicity: Circassians
- Language family: Northwest Caucasian: Circassian languages; Chakobsa

Language codes
- ISO 639-3: None (mis)
- Glottolog: None

Chakobsa (Adyghe: ШакӀобзэ, Kabardian: ЩакIуэбзэ) is a Northwest Caucasian language in the Circassian subgroup. According to linguist John Colarusso, Chakobsa is also known as shikwoshir or the 'hunting language' and was originally a secret language used only by the princes and nobles, and is still used by their descendants. An informant of Colarusso asserted that Chakobsa is based on the Circassian languages, encrypted by reordering words and changing phonemes, rather like Pig Latin but more complex.

== Etymology ==
The etymology of Chakobsa comes from the Circassian languages and is formed by the combination of two words: 'hunter' (Adyghe: шакIо / Kabardian: щакIуэ) and 'language' (бзэ). Circassians have used other secret languages or jargons besides Chakobsa. The main purpose of these languages was to hide information from commoners or enemies. Chakobsa was forbidden to commoners, and only the prince-noble class could learn and speak it.

== Documentation ==
The 18th century adventurer Jacob Reineggs renders the name of the language as Sikowschir (note the -ow- instead of -wo-), calling it a "court-language", and records the following 18 word glossary: Paphle 'eye', Brugg 'head', Baetāŏ 'ear', Wũp 'rifle', Kaepe 'horse', Ptschakoaentsche 'camel', Ptschakokaff 'cow', Tkemeschae 'goat', Fogabbe 'sheep', Naeghune 'fire', Scheghs 'water', Uppe 'woman', Aelewsae 'child', Paschae 'money', Naekuschae 'bread', Schuwghae 'raincoat', Schufae 'fur' and Tewrettgllo 'to steal'.

The language is also mentioned by the writer and traveler Jan Potocki, who visited the northern part of Caucausus in 1798.

“...in the first days of September Circassian princes leave their homes, and are removed to the mountains or in the forests, where they build huts made of branches of trees [пщыIэ; pschi’e]. Each prince is accompanied by his loyal nobles, but none of his family members dared to approach the hut, even his own brother. Here all participants stay in disguise, that is, they cover the face with masks, and did not speak Circassian; all conversations are in a certain jargon which they call ‘shakobza’

— Jan Potocki

The language has also been referred to as the "hunting language",on account that it was used by the nobility during hunting excursions.It was believed that some animals were capable of understanding human speech, therefore this language is said to have been invented to keep hunter's intentions secret to the animal prey.

Chakobsa is sometimes conflated with a similar practice of the Circassian people's neighbours, the Abkhazians. The Abkhazians utilized a "forest language" for the same purpose.

According to the German orientalist and linguist Julius Klaproth, who traveled in the Caucasus and Georgia between 1807 and 1808, the Circassians use secret languages on their raids, the two most common of which are called Schakobsché (rather than Sikowschir, as Klaproth expressly states) and Farschipsé. Of the first, which he describes as having no relation to the Circassian languages, he could not obtain any samples besides the ones given by Reineggs. The second, he says, is created by inserting ri or fé between each syllable, but from the nine examples he gives it is clear that it is more complicated than that, e.g. Circassian schah 'head' and tdl'e 'foot' which in "Farschipsé" become irisch'chari and tl'arukqari.

In his book Twelve Secrets of the Caucasus, first published in German in 1930, Lev Nussimbaum, writing under his pen name Essad Bey, also mentions a secret language called Chakobsa spoken by the inhabitants of the citadels, palaces and robbers' strongholds. He gives the following five words, stating that they were the only ones known to science: shapaka 'horse', amafa 'blood', ami 'water', asaz 'gun', and ashopshka 'coward'. (Note that the words for 'horse', 'water' and 'gun/rifle' differ from those given by Reineggs.)

In her book The Sabres of Paradise (1960), Lesley Blanch also makes mention of the "mysterious tongue" and "hunting language" Chakobsa.

== Fictional Chakobsa ==
Possibly influenced by Blanch's book, the fictional language Chakobsa is used by the Fremen of the desert planet Arrakis in Frank Herbert's 1965 novel Dune. However, the samples of this invented language which Herbert uses in the Dune series of novels are actually a mixture of Romani, Serbo-Croatian, and Arabic.
