= Living Language =

Publishing company in the United States

- Parent company: Random House
- Founded: 1946
- Country of origin: United States
- Official website: www.livinglanguage.com

Living Language, originally an imprint of Random House, LLC, was a foreign language self-study publisher. Living Language published a number of courses in languages such as French, German, Italian, Persian, Arabic, etc.

== History ==
Living Language was originally developed in 1946 by foreign language education experts to teach overseas-bound service personnel and diplomats. The Living Language imprint expanded its publishing program to include audio-only CD courses, online-based courses and comprehensive language learning kits for adults and children.

As of 2025, the imprint appears to no longer be publishing new material and its original website now redirects to an English learning website.

== Languages offered ==
Living Language offered 28 languages, including 27 oral and one sign language, that were: Arabic, Chinese, Croatian, Czech, Dothraki, Dutch, English, Persian, French, German, Greek, Hebrew, Hindi, Hungarian, Irish, Italian, Japanese, Korean, Polish, Portuguese, Russian, Spanish, Swahili, Swedish, Tagalog, Thai, Turkish, Vietnamese and American Sign Language.
