= Wenja language =

Fictional language in Far Cry Primal

Wenja
- Winja
- Pronunciation: ['win.d͡ʒa]
- Created by: Andrew Byrd; Brenna Byrd
- Date: From 2016
- Setting and usage: Far Cry Primal
- Purpose: Constructed languages: Artistic languages; Fictional languages; Wenja

Language codes
- ISO 639-3: None (mis)
- Glottolog: None

Wenja is a fictional language in the video game Far Cry Primal, developed by Ubisoft. It is spoken by the Wenja, a fictional nomadic people in the game's world set in the valley of Oros in Central Europe. Two similar dialects, spoken by the Udam and the Izila tribes, are also present in the game. The language was developed for the game by a team of linguists led by the Indo-Europeanist Andrew Byrd. The use of a prehistoric language instead of English was intended to create a more immersive in-game experience.

Proto-Indo-European (PIE), which is theorised to have been spoken around 4000 BCE, was deemed too modern for a game set around 10000 BCE. Therefore, Ubisoft sought to project the language back in time, creating what Byrd called a "proto-Proto-Indo-European". This language was further divided into two dialects, Wenja and Udam, while the Izila tribe speak a different dialect that resembles PIE more closely.

Far Cry Primal's dialects are one of the few appearances of PIE and a PIE-based constructed language in a mass-consumed medium, and it was also the first time a video game featured a constructed prehistoric language. As of June 2017, Wenja and Izila comprised about 2400 words (roughly 1200 each), with both dialects having a full grammar. In total, 40,000 words of dialogue, mostly in Wenja, were developed for the game.

== Development ==
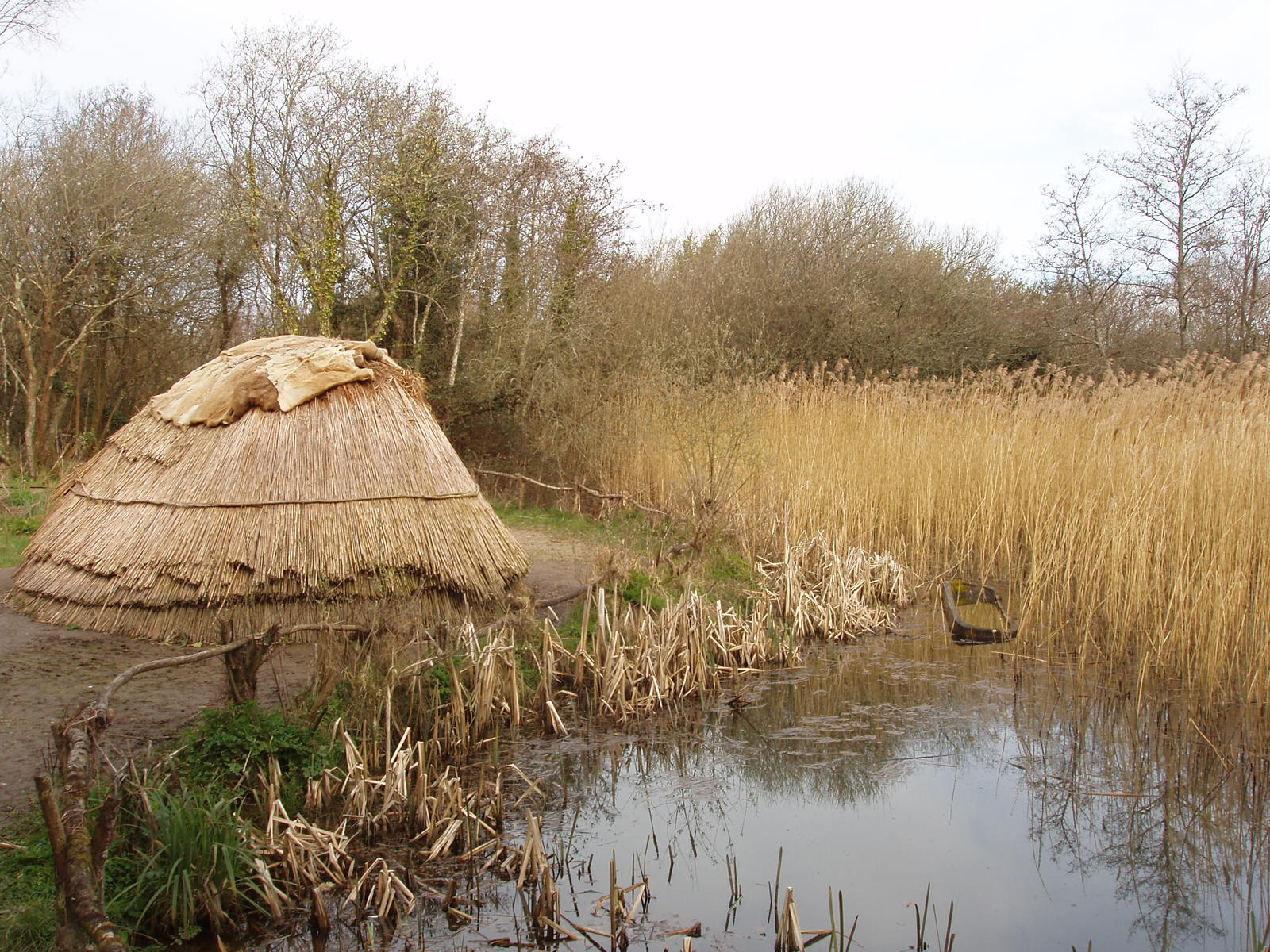
Reconstruction of a "temporary" Mesolithic house in Ireland; this type of dwelling is characteristic of the time period when Wenja would have been spoken.

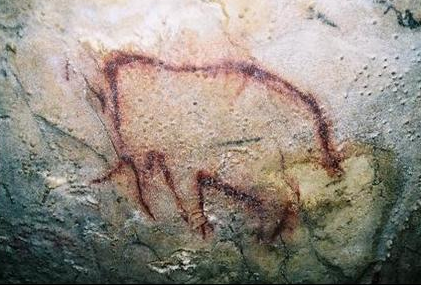
Drawing of a mammoth on a cave wall in Arcy-sur-Cure (France). Mammoths figure prominently in the fictional valley of Oros.

During the early development stages for Far Cry Primal, the Ubisoft team struggled to create a script that sounded convincing in the game's prehistoric setting. They found that all attempts in English sounded "trite or just plain wrong, either too much like modern man or too much like science fiction." In search for a solution, the team stumbled upon recordings of Proto-Indo-European by Andrew Byrd for Archaeology and ultimately decided to hire him and his wife Brenna Byrd to lead a team of linguists that would recreate a language suitable for the game. The full team was composed by Andrew Miles Byrd, Brenna Reinhart Byrd, Jessica DeLisi, Chiara Bozzone and Ryan Paul Sandell.

The team then conducted a test using a script in primitive English and another in Wenja, and found that English did not fit the period. As a result, they decided to further develop the Wenja language. Initially, Wenja was just a simplified version of PIE, but this was also deemed too modern for the game. The linguists were then tasked to project the language even further back in time, resulting in what Andrew Byrd referred to as a "proto-Proto-Indo-European".

To imagine an earlier version of the language, one that may have been spoken about 7,000 years before PIE existed, the team used their knowledge of the earlier stages of PIE. They looked at features of PIE that appear to be archaic and assumed them to be the normal features for Wenja. The language being based mostly on reconstructed PIE roots, the team drew inspiration particularly from Hittite, the oldest attested Indo-European language. As a result, Wenja lacks grammatical gender and is also pre-ablaut, as those features were imagined to have come about at a later stage. The vocabulary was also inspired by the imagined contemporaneous culture, reflecting the material and religious culture of the period.

A small number of words necessary for the game could not be reconstructed from PIE and had to be invented. Some of these words were constructed via compound words, such as dang ("yak"), a form contracted from dansugwawi ("shaggy cow", based on Hittite dassus and PIE *gʷṓws). Others were derived from modern roots, such as mamaf ("mammoth"), derived directly from its English equivalent. Finally, yet others were developed from plausible evolution. For example, PIE lacks a reconstructed term for "yes", so the team imagined an expression that may develop to have that meaning and came up with "it is correct". The corresponding phrase in reconstructed PIE, *h₃reǵtóm h₁ésti, was then subjected to the sound languages and possible syllable clipping imagined for the proto-language, and ended up as shrash in the Wenja dialect and tómhe in Izila.

Once the language was ready, it was taught to the actors. During this phase, some war cries and chants were developed. Actors and linguists would speak to each other in Wenja in their spare time. According to Brenna Byrd, "[this was] when this hypothetical ancient language — just a jumble of sounds, really — began to feel tangible, natural, a living language". The game only translates part of the dialogues and interactions, which encourages players to learn at least some keywords in order to understand what is happening and to know what actions they should take to continue playing.

== Dialects ==
Wenja is both the name given to the language in the game's documentation, and the name of its main dialect. Each of the peoples in Far Cry Primal speak a slightly different language, and they derive their names from their respective dialect. Thus the Wenja derive their name from the Wenja verb wana, "to hunt"; the Udam from the Udam expression U damnash, "let's conquer"; and the Izila from the Izila phrase his-hílax, "the masters".

=== Wenja and Udam ===
The Wenja and Udam dialects represent an older form of the language, which was created systematically by internal reconstruction based on the most irregular features of PIE, which are usually vestiges of older forms. The Wenja and the Udam basically speak two close dialects of the same language, which are mutually intelligible to a great extent. The differences are subtle and appear mainly in pronunciation and intonation. The Udam are "very brassy" and their dialect sounds "very deliberate".

=== Izila ===
The Izila dialect is largely based on the standard academic version of Proto-Indo-European, with "some simplifications to make it a little easier to say and in grammar and pronunciation". The intonational pattern of Izila is also different, more "sing-songy" than Wenja. When the characters meet the Izila, they do not completely understand them, but some communication can get through since most of the vocabulary is related. Since Izila is essentially the same language as PIE, this article deals mainly with the other dialects: Wenja and Udam.

== Phonology ==
=== Consonants ===
There are 22 consonant phonemes in the Wenja and Izila dialects. In the following IPA chart, each sound in Wenja is given with its spelling in brackets.

Consonant phonemes
	Labial		Alveolar		Post- alveolar		Palatal	Velar		Glottal
Nasal		m ⟨m⟩		n ⟨n⟩						
Plosive	p ⟨p⟩	b ⟨b⟩	t ⟨t⟩	d ⟨d⟩				k ⟨k⟩	ɡ ⟨g⟩	
Affricate					tʃ ⟨ch⟩	dʒ ⟨j⟩				
Fricative	f ⟨f⟩		s ⟨s⟩	z ⟨z⟩	ʃ ⟨sh⟩			(x ⟨x⟩)		h ⟨h⟩
Approximant				l ⟨l⟩		r ⟨r⟩	j ⟨y⟩		w ⟨w⟩	

The letters ⟨c⟩, ⟨q⟩ and ⟨v⟩ do not appear in Wenja, although ⟨c⟩ appears in the digraph ⟨ch⟩. The digraphs ⟨kw⟩ and ⟨gw⟩ represent /kw/ and /gw/ in Wenja, rather than /kʷ/ and /gʷ/ as reconstructed for PIE. The pronunciation of Wenja consonants has only a few peculiarities for an English-speaker:

- /r/ is trilled as in the Spanish word perro.
- /x/ (a sound that doesn't exist in most dialects of English) appears only in Izila words and is usually a reflex of Wenja /ʃ/: compare Wenja dugishtar, Izila dugáxter "daughter" (both from PIE *dʰugh₂tḗr, same meaning) or Wenja dwash, Izila dwáx "far" (from PIE *dweh₂-, "to move away")

To recreate an earlier stage of PIE, and at the same time produce a language suitable for the game, the linguist team performed a series of changes to PIE roots:

- Voiced aspirates were adapted as normal voiced stops in Wenja: *bʰ, dʰ, ǵʰ, gʰ, gʷʰ > b, d, j, g, gw, respectively.
- Palatal stops were adapted as (alveopalatal) affricates in Wenja: *ḱ, ǵ, ǵʰ > ch, j, j, respectively.
- PIE laryngeals were fully integrated into Wenja:
  - *h₁ > h: *dʰh₁s- "sacred, religious" → *dʰəh₁s- > Wenja dahisna, "temple".
  - *h₂ > sh: *sth₂-to- "standing, made to stand" → *stəh₂-to- > Wenja tashta, "stand, pedestal". (Note: The PIE phenomenon known as "s-mobile" refers to the appearance or absence of an "s" at the beginning of a root. It is not unreasonable to assume that at some point, this "s" was a prefix of some sort. Therefore, the team of linguists working on the Wenja language in Far Cry Primal assumed that in proto-PIE, there were no roots with an original "s." This allowed them to further project the language back in time and create a more plausible version of a prehistoric language for the game.)
  - *h₃ > f: *dh₃-ti- "gift" → *dəh₃-ti- > Wenja dafti, "(mutual) exchange". (Note: While *h₃ is usually reconstructed as a rounded voiced pharyngeal or uvular fricative, the developing team deemed the sound too difficult to pronounce for the actors; therefore it was changed to /f/, since it was a fricative sound, labial in some way, easy to pronounce for the actors and a conceivable outcome of the actual PIE sound.)
- Reduced sonorants (r̥, l̥, m̥, n̥) were also deemed a further development of PIE; therefore Wenja always has a vowel next to them, such as Wenja dacham, "ten" from *deḱm̥ or Wenja marti, "death" from *mr̥tos.

=== Vowels ===
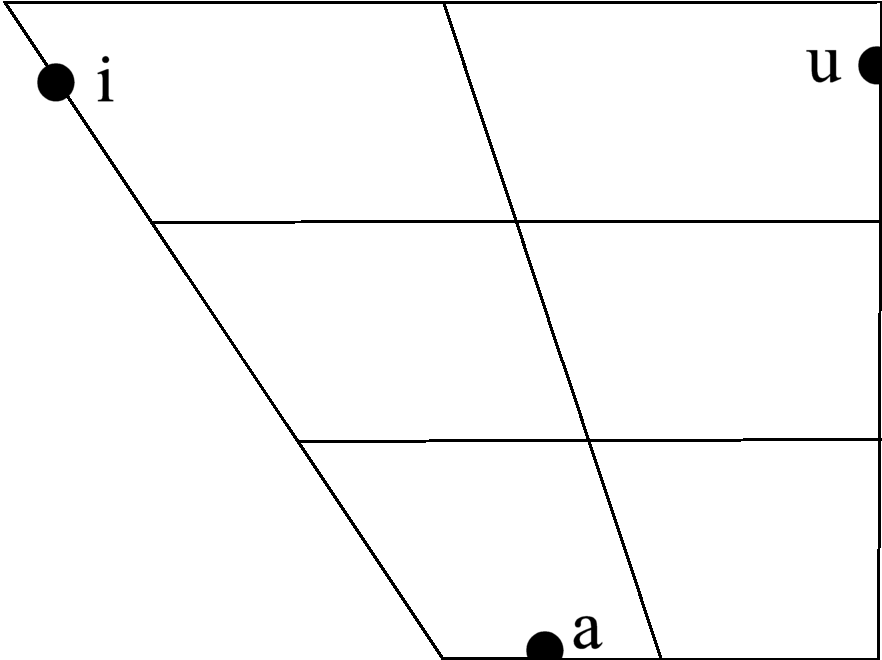
Vowel chart representing the approximate pronunciation of vowels in Wenja.

Vowel chart representing the approximate pronunciation of diphthongs in Wenja.

These two vowel charts representing the approximate pronunciation of vowels in Arabic, which are roughly the same ones used in Wenja.

Wenja has a three vowel system shown below:

Vowel phonemes
	Front	Back
Close	i ⟨i⟩	u ⟨u⟩
Open	a ⟨a⟩	
Diphthongs	aj ⟨ay⟩, aw ⟨aw⟩	

Unlike in PIE, there is no difference in vowel length in Wenja. This was a decision taken by the development team to make the pronunciation easier for monolingual English speakers.

Three of the vowels of PIE, *e, *a, and *o were merged to Wenja a. This is because the alternance of *e and *o, or ablaut, was considered a later development in PIE. Thus Wenja can be considered phonetically "pre-ablaut".

=== Prosody ===
With regard to prosody, Wenja features a trochaic rhythm, in which generally with every other syllable is stressed. This makes the intonation predictable and give the language an intentional "caveman" rhythm. This creates a rhythmic feel to the language, with 2- and 4-syllable words being always perfect trochees: dácham, "ten"; kúshla, "back"; mága, "can"; shàwikwála, "shepherd"; shìyugwáyfa, "eternal life"; etc. 3-syllable words are stressed on the first vowel if it is a (shnár-hadan, "cannibal"; shwádisha, "to pull") and on the second if this is i or u (sunstáshman, "regime"; fumáygan, "piss-man"; izíla, "Izila"; hisúbar, "quiver").

Izila, as an intentionally different intonational pattern, is comparatively less predictable and more "sing-songy." The linguistic team used this so players could more easily differentiate the dialects.

== Grammar ==
The phonology, grammar, vocabulary, and semantics of Wenja are based on Proto-Indo-European and its daughter languages, notably Greek, Sanskrit, Hittite, Latin and the Germanic languages. Typologically, Wenja has both prepositions and postpositions, and its default pragmatic word order is subject–object–verb (SOV). Adjectives in Wenja are placed before the nouns they modify. New words can be formed through prefixing, suffixing, and compounding.

=== Morphology ===
Wenja nouns and adjectives are not marked for number or gender, but they can be inflected by six clitic postpositions, which are only attached to the main noun they modify. This feature is based on the fact that cases tend to come from actual words, so it was assumed that at an earlier stage those words would behave like clitics. The six postpositions used in Wenja are:

Wenja postpositions
	Meaning	Example
-(i)s	of (genitive)	ti-mashtaris mashtarha haymas, "we're going with your mother's mother"
-i/-y	to, for (dative)	shash miyi, "the rock is for me / mine"
-su	in, on, at (locative)	halchi chawhisu chawda, "the elk hides in shadows"
-ha	with (instrumental)	sam gwaruha, "with one spear"
-bi	from, by, than (ablative)	shash mibi chawda, "the rock hides from me"
-(i)m	toward, into, onto (lative)	sim gwanam, "I'm coming for him" (lit. "towards him")

Some adjectives form the comparative by adding -r to the adjective stem: Urus shanti, ma tigri shantir, "Oros is close, but the tiger is closer". Most commonly the regular adjective is used after the postposition -bi: Martibi shwapa!, "Worse than death!". To indicate the superlative, Wenja normally uses reduplication: shan-shanti, "very close / the closest".

Reduplication is productive in adjectives and verbs. In the former, it intensifies the meaning and produces the superlative. In the later, it forms the iterative aspect. The reduplicant always has two morae in Wenja, hence pal-palhu ("very many") or daba-dabu ("very few") (not pa-palhu or da-dabu).

There are five main suffixes that can be attached to verb stems to create new nouns in Wenja:

- Agent/Participle: -n (lajan, "gatherer; gathering")
- Patient: -ta (lashta, "gathered, thing gathered")
- Instrument: -tar (lajatar / lashtar, "scythe > tool of gathering")
- Action: -man (lajaman / lashman, "(a) gathering")
- Abstraction: -ti (lajati / lashti, "idea of gathering")

There are three sets of personal pronouns in Wenja. Stressed pronouns are used for nominal / adjectival predicates, intransitive subjects and direct objects. Unstressed pronouns are attached to verbs or particles in other cases. Possessive pronouns are attached to the word they describe and can also combine with postpositions.

Stressed pronouns
	sg	pl
1st	mu I / me	mas we / us
2nd	ta you	tan you
3rd	sa he, she, it / him, her, it	say they / them

Unstressed pronouns
	sg	pl
1st	-m I / me	-mas we / us
2nd	-ta you	-tan you
3rd	ø / -sa he, she, it / him, her, it	-(a)rsh they / them

Possessive pronouns
	sg	pl
1st	mi- my	mash- / masi- our
2nd	ti- your	tay- / tani- your
3rd	si- his, her, its	arsh- / arsi- their

Wenja verbs feature three aspects (imperfective, completive, iterative), two moods (indicative, imperative) and two voices (active, passive). Verbs have also an infinitive form, and can be made reflexive by means of a reflexive suffix. The causative is indicated either morphologically or periphrastically. Endings do not necessarily attach to the verb stem.

There are no discrete tenses in Wenja. All aspects can express any tense, although the completive is commonly used as a past:

- The imperfective aspect is unmarked and can indicate the present as well as the past and future.
- The completive aspect is marked by the prefix hu- and denotes that the action is fully completed and thus no longer relevant to the moment of speech (hars hu-gwanam, "I killed the bear" [implying "this is done with and there is no need to worry about that bear anymore"]).
- The iterative aspect is marked by copying the first syllable of the verb. Compare kwadi marimas? ("why do we die?") with kwadi mari-marimas? ("why do we keep dying?").

Wenja does not have a discrete passive voice, but prefers to leave out an underlying agent (num hu-gwan, "(it) killed me / I was killed"). However, a passive may be formed by indicating the demoted agent with the instrumental postposition -ha. Compare num hu-gwanta ("you killed me") and num tiha hu-gwan ("I was killed by you").

Verbs can be made reflexive by adding the reflexive suffix -ra. As with the passive, reflexive verbs do not need to be inflected for person: numra kayda ("I hit myself"), nara Udam hada ("an Udam does not eat himself"). The causative can be indicated in two ways: morphologically adding the suffix -ay(a) to a verb (mu shnar mara haday, "the man made me eat an apple") or periphrastically by means of the verb daha, "to do" (shnar mara hada daham, "I made the man eat an apple").

The imperative mood is in its most basic just the verb stem. However, it is often preceded by the particle u: u shlawdra gwash ("walk free"). The negative imperative is always preceded by the particle may: may dram! ("don't run!"). The infinitive is also made up of the bare verbal stem: gwar gwan dawsam ("I need to kill the beasts").

=== Syntax ===
Typologically, Wenja has a pragmatic word order that by default is subject–object–verb (SOV). The copula, hasa (from PIE *h₁es- "to be") is typically omitted the (Da chamsa, "Da is ready") except in formal contexts.

Wenja nouns and pronouns can be either active or inactive. Active nominals are agents of transitive or intransitive verbs, while inactive nominals are subjects of nominal predication, subjects of inactive intransitive verbs and objects of transitive verbs. While active nominals trigger endings on the verb, inactive nominals trigger endings on a sentence initial particle. A significant distinction is made in Wenja between animate and inanimate nouns, as only animate subjects trigger verbal endings:

	inanimate	animate
3rd sg	mara harha the apple rests	chwan harha the dog rests
3rd pl	mara harha the apples rest	chwan harharsh the dogs rest

Sentences in Wenja commonly start with a sentence-initial particle. These particles can both indicate grammatical properties and serve as conjunctions. The ten main sentence starters are:

- nu (pre-vowel variant nw-): "indeed, yes, now" (emphasises realis mood).
- na: "no, not"
- ku (pre-vowel variant kw-): interrogative particle. (Note: This particle was developed as a possible antecesor of PIE *kʷ-. For its use, compare the Japanese particle ka.)
- u (pre-vowel variant w-): positive imperative.
- may: negative imperative.
- tu (pre-vowel variant tw-): "then" (temporal sequence); "so, then".
- ma: "but" (adversative).
- ba: exclamative particle.
- ha: "in order to, so that" (final)
- aysh: subjunctive, optative (marks the sentence as an irrealis mood)

Subordination is relatively uncommon in Wenja; the language generally uses conjunctions or parataxis. Nevertheless, it can employ the relative pronoun/adjective ya, which means "who, which, what" in relative sentences: Wantar hafchu fakwi daws: na ya alya pacharsh, pacha daws, "A hunter needs fast eyes, they must see what others do not see".

== Basic expressions and sample sentences ==
Below follow some basic expressions in Wenja:

English	Wenja	IPA
Hello	Smarkaka	/ˈsmar.ka.ka/
How are you?	Ku-ta su?	/ˈku.ta ˈsu/
I'm fine	Mu su	/ˈmu ˈsu/
Thank you	Gwarshta	/ˈgwarʃ.ta/
Play Far Cry now	U-nu Far Kray lija!	/ˈu.nu ˈfar.kraj ˈlidʒa/

The following sentence starts with the particle nu and uses the imperfective with a future meaning:

Nu mash-wantar pur-ha shitawgarsh.
ˈnu maʃˈwantar ˈpurha ʃiˈtawgarʃ
now our.hunter fire.INS frighten.3PL
Now our hunters will frighten them with fire.

This example illustrates the use of the completive aspect (note that the second verb remains in imperfective). Note also that the particle ma works as a conjunction to join both sentences:

Udam palhu Winja hu-gwana, ma mash-damsham Udam gwar barta!
ˈudam ˈpalhu ˈwindʒa huˈgwana ˈma maʃ-ˈdamʃam ˈudam gwar ˈbarta
Udam many Wenja COMPL.kill.3SG but our-home.ACC Udam beast bring.2SG
The Udam have killed many Wenja, but you brought an Udam beast to our home!

== See also ==
- Indo-European ablaut

== Bibliography ==
- Apolon (20 February 2016). "Far Cry Primal Interview: How Ubisoft Brought Ancient Languages Back To Life". Player.One.
- Byrd, Andrew Miles (4 March 2016). "Wenja Grammar: Reduplication". Speaking Primal.
- Byrd, Andrew Miles (8 March 2016). "Wenja Grammar: hu-". Speaking Primal.
- Byrd, Andrew Miles (18 March 2016). "Wenja Grammar: Sentence Starters". Speaking Primal.
- Byrd, Andrew Miles (20 March 2016). "Pronunciation Guide". Speaking Primal.
- Byrd, Andrew Miles (21 April 2016). "Wenja's Roots: Dwani (Sounds), Part 1". Speaking Primal.
- Byrd, Andrew Miles (27 April 2016). "Wenja's Roots: Dwani (Sounds), Part 2". Speaking Primal.
- Byrd, Andrew Miles (1 May 2016). "Wenja Grammar: The Causative". Speaking Primal.
- Byrd, Andrew Miles (2 May 2016). "Wenja Language: gwar "beasts", Part 1". Speaking Primal.
- Byrd, Andrew Miles (3 May 2016). "Wenja Language: gwar "beasts", Part 2". Speaking Primal.
- Byrd, Andrew Miles (6 May 2016). "Wenja's Roots: Dwani (Sounds), Part 3". Speaking Primal.
- Byrd, Andrew Miles (13 June 2016). "Wenja's Roots: Dwani (Sounds), Part 4". Speaking Primal.
- Byrd, Andrew Miles (15 July 2016). "Wenja's Roots: Dwani (Sounds), Part 5". Speaking Primal.
- Byrd, Andrew Miles (13 June 2017). "Lexicon". Speaking Primal.
- Byrd, Andrew Miles (13 June 2017). "A Grammar of Izila (His-hílax)". Speaking Primal.
- Byrd, Andrew Miles (6 February 2017). "How to Speak Wenja: the Intro Cinematics". Speaking Primal.
- Byrd, Andrew Miles (10 February 2017). "How to Speak Wenja : Sayla's Scenes, part 2". Speaking Primal.
- Byrd, Andrew Miles (18 June 2017). "How to Speak Wenja: Jayma's scenes". Speaking Primal.
- Byrd, Andrew Miles (22 March 2018). "The Grammar of Wenja". Ubisoft's Far Cry Primal.
- Easy Wenja Phrasebook: The Reference for Stone Age Conversations. Belgium: Ubisoft. 2016.
- Finch, Andrew (24 February 2016). "Resurrecting a Dead Language in Far Cry Primal". Xbox Wire.
- Guttentag, Becca (18 July 2019). "Full immersion – diving headfirst into Far Cry's conlangs". Supertext.
- Hairston, Gail (25 January 2016). "UK Professors Go Primal with 'Far Cry'". College of Arts & Sciences. University of Kentucky.
- Hypolite, Damien (19 February 2016). "JEUX VIDEO. Ils ont créé un langage préhistorique pour le jeu "Far Cry Primal"". Sciences et Avenir (in French).
- Jackson, Stephen (26 February 2016). "The Birth of Wenja – How Far Cry Primal created an entirely new language of its own". Gaming Respawn.
- Mac Séalaigh, Colmán (7 March 2016). "Teangacha 'Far Cry Primal'... faoi anáil na Gaeilge!". Nós.
- Te, Zorine (26 January 2016). "Far Cry Primal Developers Talk About Uncovering History". GameSpot. CBS Interactive.
- "The tribe of Far Cry Primal Stone Age experts". Ubisoft Montréal. 2016.
