= Jessie Peterson =

American language creator

- Education: CU Boulder (PhD)
- Occupation: Language creator
- Known for: Developing Chakobsa for Dune: Part Two
- Spouse: David J. Peterson (m. 2023)
- Website: quothalinguist.com

Jessie Peterson (formerly Sams) is an American language creator, linguist and writer. She is most known for the languages she has developed in collaboration with her husband David J. Peterson for various media, most prominently the Chakobsa language for the film Dune: Part Two. She has a PhD in Linguistics from the University of Colorado at Boulder and was a professor of linguistics at Stephen F. Austin State University where she created a course on language construction. She is the author of a textbook on language construction entitled How to Create a Language: The Conlang Guide.

== Personal life ==
In 2023, Peterson became engaged to and subsequently married linguist and fellow conlanger David J. Peterson.
