= Dothraki language =

Fictional language in "Game of Thrones"

Dothraki
- Lekh Dothraki
- Pronunciation: [ˈdɤθɾaki]
- Created by: George R. R. Martin, David J. Peterson
- Date: From 2009
- Setting and usage: A Song of Ice and Fire, 2011 series Game of Thrones
- Purpose: Constructed languages: Artistic languages; Fictional languages; Dothraki

Language codes
- ISO 639-3: None (mis)
- Glottolog: None
- IETF: art-x-dothraki

The Dothraki language is a constructed fictional language in George R. R. Martin's fantasy novel series A Song of Ice and Fire and its television adaptation Game of Thrones. It is spoken by the Dothraki, a nomadic people in the series's fictional world. The language was developed for the TV series by the language creator David J. Peterson, working off the Dothraki words and phrases in Martin's novels.

As of September 2011, the language comprised 3163 words, not all of which have been made public. In 2012, 146 newborn girls in the United States were named "Khaleesi", the Dothraki term for the wife of a khal or ruler, and the title adopted in the series by Daenerys Targaryen. Dothraki and Valyrian have been described by The Economist as "the most convincing fictional tongues since Elvish".

== Development ==
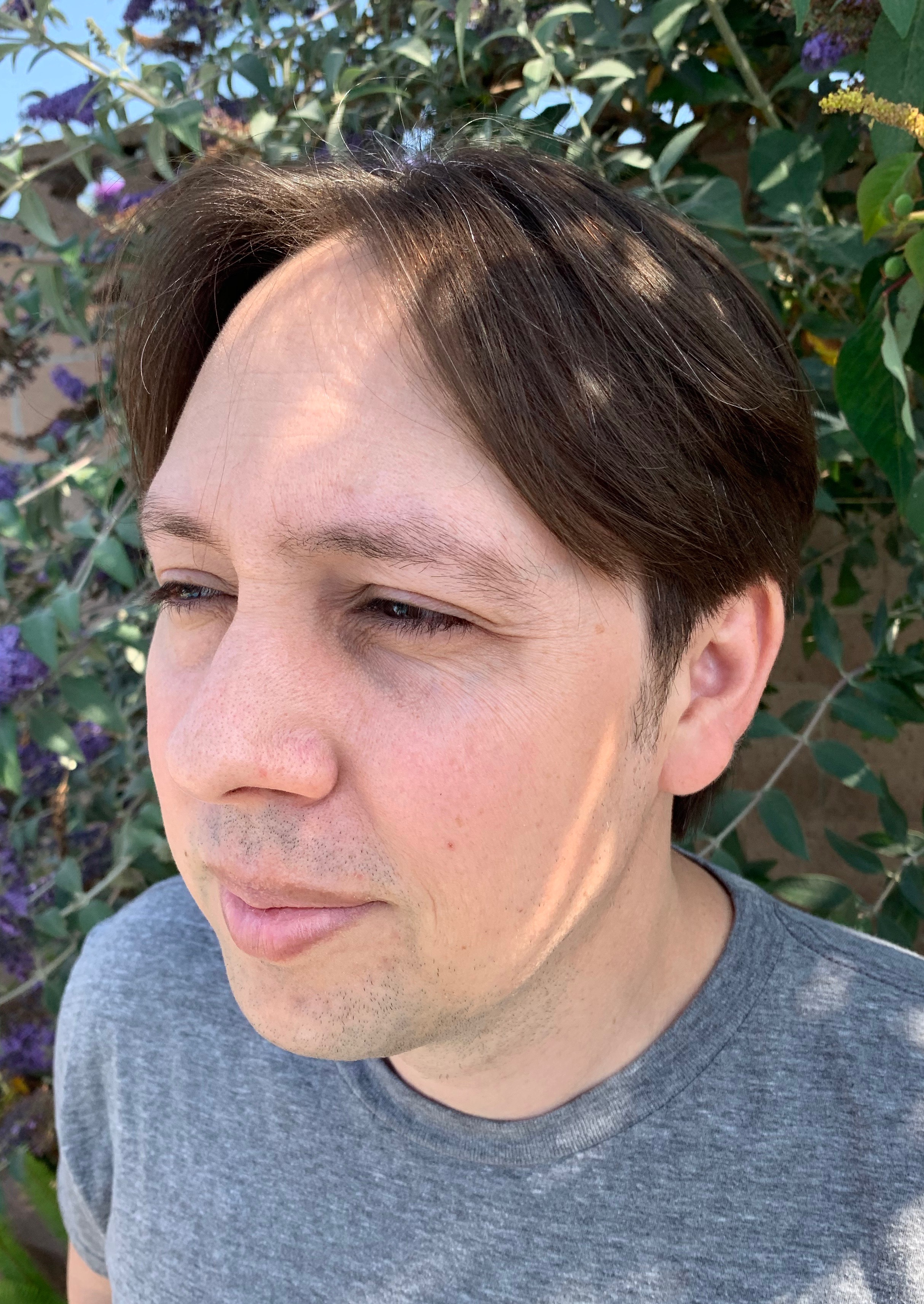
David J. Peterson, creator of the Dothraki spoken language for Game of Thrones

The Dothraki vocabulary was created by David J. Peterson well in advance of the adaptation. HBO hired the Language Creation Society to create the language, and after an application process involving over 30 conlangers, Peterson was chosen to develop the Dothraki language. He delivered over 1700 words to HBO before the initial shooting. Peterson drew inspiration from George R. R. Martin's description of the language, as well as from such languages as Estonian, Inuktitut, Turkish, Russian, and Swahili.

David J. Peterson and his development of the Dothraki language were featured on an April 8, 2012 episode of CNN's The Next List. He went on to create the Valyrian languages for season 3 of Game of Thrones. Peterson and his development of Dothraki were also featured on the January 8, 2017 episode of To Tell the Truth.

=== Language constraints ===
The Dothraki language was developed under two significant constraints. First, the language had to match the uses already put down in the books. Secondly, it had to be easily pronounceable or learnable by the actors. These two constraints influenced the grammar and phonology of the language: for instance, as in English, there is no contrast between aspirated and unaspirated stops.

== Phonology and romanization ==
David Peterson has said, "You know, most people probably don't really know what Arabic actually sounds like, so to an untrained ear, it might sound like Arabic. To someone who knows Arabic, it doesn't. I tend to think of the sound as a mix between Arabic (minus the distinctive pharyngeals) and Spanish, due to the dental consonants."

Regarding the orthography, the Dothraki themselves do not have a writing system—nor do many of the surrounding peoples (e.g., the Lhazareen). If there were to be any written examples of Dothraki in the A Song of Ice and Fire universe, it would be in a writing system developed in the Free Cities and adapted to Dothraki, or in some place like Ghis or Qarth, which do have writing systems.

=== Consonants ===
There are 23 consonant phonemes in the Dothraki language. In the following IPA chart, each sound in Dothraki is given with the romanization in brackets.

Consonants
		Labial	Dental	Alveolar	Palatal	Velar	Uvular	Glottal
Nasal		m ⟨m⟩	n̪ ⟨n⟩					
Plosive	voiceless		t̪ ⟨t⟩		tʃ ⟨ch⟩	k ⟨k⟩	q ⟨q⟩	
Plosive	voiced		d̪ ⟨d⟩		dʒ ⟨j⟩	ɡ ⟨g⟩		
Fricative	voiceless	f ⟨f⟩	θ ⟨th⟩	s ⟨s⟩	ʃ ⟨sh⟩	x ⟨kh⟩		h ~ ħ ⟨h⟩
Fricative	voiced	v ⟨v⟩		z ⟨z⟩	ʒ ⟨zh⟩			
Approximant			l̪ ⟨l⟩		j ⟨y⟩	w ⟨w⟩		
Rhotic				r ~ ɾ ⟨r⟩				

The letters ⟨c⟩ and ⟨x⟩ do not appear in Dothraki, although ⟨c⟩ appears in the digraph ⟨ch⟩.

⟨p⟩ and ⟨b⟩ seem to appear only in names, as in Pono and Bharbo. These consonants were used in the past but have since lenited into [f] and [v]. They can still be used as variants of /f/ and /v/.

Voiceless stops may be aspirated. This does not change word meaning.

The geminates of consonants marked with digraphs have a reduced orthography:

- ⟨kkh⟩ represents /xː/ (not /kx/)
- ⟨tth⟩ represents /θː/ (not /tθ/)
- ⟨ssh⟩ represents /ʃː/ (not /sʃ/)
- ⟨zzh⟩ represents /ʒː/ (not /zʒ/)

=== Vowels ===
Dothraki has a four vowel system shown below:

	Front	Back
Close	i ⟨i⟩	
Mid	e ⟨e⟩	o ⟨o⟩
Open	a ⟨a⟩	

There are no diphthongs.

In the A Song of Ice and Fire books, ⟨u⟩ never occurs as a vowel, appearing only after ⟨q⟩, and only in names, as in Jhiqui and Quaro.

In sequence of multiple vowels, each such vowel represents a separate syllable. Examples: shierak [ʃi.eˈɾak] ('star'), rhaesh [ɾhaˈeʃ] ('country'), khaleesi [ˈxa.le.e.si] ('queen').

The vowels /i, e, o, a/ are realized as [e, ɛ, ɔ, ɑ] after /q/. /o/ turns into [ɤ] after dental consonants. /o/ can be pronounced as [u] after /ɡ, k, x/.

== Grammar ==
=== Parts of speech ===
Though prepositions are also sometimes employed, the language is foremost inflectional. Prefixes, suffixes and circumfixes are all used. Verbs conjugate in infinitive, past, present, future, two imperatives and (archaic) participle; they also agree with person, number and polarity. Nouns divide into two classes, inanimate and animate. They decline in five cases, nominative, accusative, genitive, allative and ablative. Animate nouns also decline according to number.

=== Word order ===
The basic word order is SVO (subject–verb–object). In a basic sentence, the order of these elements (when all three are present) is as in English: first comes the subject (S), followed by the verb (V), and then the object (O).

Khal ahhas arakh.
{The Khal} sharpened {the arakh}.
S V O

When only a subject is present, the subject precedes the verb, as it does in English:

Arakh hasa.
{The arakh} {is sharp}.
S V

In noun phrases, there is a specific order as well. The order is as follows:

jin ave sekke verven anni m'orvikoon
this father very violent of.mine with.a.whip
demonstrative noun adverb adjective genitive noun prepositional phrase
this very violent father of mine with a whip

In prepositional phrases, prepositions always precede their noun complements.

Further examples of demonstratives include:

jin arakh
this {arakh (type of blade)}

rek hrakkares
that lion

Further examples of adjectives include:

rakh haj
boy strong
'strong boy'

alegra ivezh
duck wild
'wild duck'

Adverbs normally are sentence final, but they can also immediately follow the verb. Modal particles precede the verb.

In the episode "Andy's Ancestry" from the United States television show The Office, Dwight Schrute created the Dothraki phrase "throat rip" by putting "throat" in the accusative and placing it in front of the transitive verb. Compounds of this sort are a form of object incorporation. Peterson adopted this technique and called it the "Schrutean compound".

== Sample ==
Nevakhi vekha ha maan: Rekke, m'aresakea norethi fitte.
ˈnevaxi ˈvexa ha maˈan ˈrekːe ˈmaɾesakea ˈnoɾeθi ˈfitːe
seat.GEN exist.3SG.PRES for 3SG.ALL there.ACC with.coward.ALL.PL hair.GEN short
There is a place for him: There, with the short-haired cowards.
