= Verdurian language =

Constructed language of fictional world

Verdurian
- soa Sfahe
- Created by: Mark Rosenfelder
- Date: 1995
- Purpose: Constructed language: Verdurian

Language codes
- ISO 639-3: None (mis)
- Glottolog: None
- IETF: art-x-verduria

Verdurian (soa Sfahe, "the Speech") is a constructed language created by Mark Rosenfelder, first published in 1995 and hosted at his website, Zompist.com.

Verdurian is a fictional language, which in Rosenfelder's constructed world is spoken in the nation of Verduria, on the planet Almea.

Verdurian is the most-developed and best-known of the languages of Almea.

== Phonology and grammar ==
Verdurian's phonology has eight vowels and twenty-one consonants. Among the most exotic of its sounds is the voiced uvular fricative (ʁ), which is transcribed as an R with a háček over it (Ř, ř). Verdurian also has its own alphabet.

Verdurian has SVO word order, fusional morphology, and accusative morphosyntactic alignment.

This language has two genders (masculine and feminine), two numbers (singular and plural) and four cases (nominative, genitive, accusative and dative). There are 4 tenses (present, past, past anterior and future).

== Alphabet and fonts ==
The Verdurian alphabet is used to write several languages of the Cadhinorian Plain on the world of Almea, most notably Verdurian, but also (with some supplemental characters) Caizu, Kebreni, Ismaîn, Sarroc, and Flaidish. It derives from the ancient Cadhinorian alphabet (equivalent to the Verdurian capital letters), and this in turn derives from the alphabet of Cuzei. The Verdurian alphabet may be used to write both ancient languages, Cadhinor and Cuêzi.

Verdurian is currently included in the unofficial ConScript Unicode Registry (CSUR), which assigns code points in the Private Use Area. Verdurian code points are mapped to the range U+E200 to U+E26F.

The eight “Aux” variant fonts of Kurinto (Kurinto Text Aux, Book Aux, Sans Aux, etc.) support the Verdurian alphabet.

== Real-life history ==
When Rosenfelder was a freshman in college, his dorm was next to that of a Dungeons & Dragons aficionado, one Chris Vargas. Vargas introduced Rosenfelder to the game, and Rosenfelder created the wilderness and also the languages for the game. All the players in Vargas and Rosenfelder's Dungeons & Dragons group were given Verdurian names.

The language borrows words and grammar from various languages of Europe, but has been described as not resembling any one language. Many of the words were inspired directly by French or Russian. Others, such as "elir" for life, were a priori coinages by Rosenfelder. There are also words based on political humor, e.g. 'fanaticism' is sunmünmún and 'terror' is arhafát.

== Fictional history ==
In Rosenfelder's Almean universe, Verdurian is spoken by about 55 million people in the kingdom of Verduria, as well as nations nearby in Almea's Cadhinorian plain.

Verdurian is a member of the Eastern language phylum. This derives from a proto-language called proto-Eastern, spoken by invaders of the Cadhinorian and Xurnese plains, about 4,000 years before the present time in Rosenfelder's universe. Some of the Eastern invaders were Cuzeian, while others were Cadhinorian. Cadhinorians picked up civilization from Cuzeians (who left behind such works as the Count of Years, showing the clear influence of Tolkien). The Cadhinorians spoke a classical language called Cadhinorian (its relationship to Verdurian is analogous to that of Latin to Spanish). After the fall of the Cadhinorian Empire, Cadhinorian developed into several daughter languages, among them Old Verdurian, which evolved later into Modern Verdurian.

The fictional country of Verduria has an embassy in Linköping, Sweden.

== Verdurian's popularity ==
Out of all the languages of Almea, Verdurian is not only the best-developed but the most popular. Rosenfelder has translated texts from other languages into Verdurian and also published short stories and a newspaper in the language. He has also started a Verdurian course due to the requests of Verdurian aficionados, and the language was so popular as to inspire a Zompist.com spin-off Internet forum.

== Verdurian in popular culture ==
Verdurian makes an appearance in the novel Gaits of Heaven, one of Susan Conant's "Dog Lover's Mysteries". The character Johanna does linguistic research with a feminist bent on grammatical gender "in Hebrew, Verdurian and various other languages in which verbs as well as nouns are masculine, feminine, or, in some instances, neuter".

== Samples of the language ==
Proše mižu: --Žaneno, tan satenam mážula er gorat, kiei finta attróue so syel er tan lažecom brac, pro dy řo ažlädam fne soa pera almea Ekaiei. – From the story of the Tower of Babel.

Translation: Then they said: "Come, let us build a town and a tower, whose top will reach the heavens; and let us get ourselves glory, so that we are not scattered across all the earth."

So cuon er so ailuro eu druki. Cuon ride še slušir misotém ailurei. So ailuro e arašó rizuec.

Translation: The dog and the cat are friends. The dog laughs at the cat's jokes. The cat is quite amusing.
