= Far Cry Primal =

2016 video game

- Developer: Ubisoft Montreal (Note: Additional work by Ubisoft Toronto, Ubisoft Shanghai and Ubisoft Kyiv)
- Publisher: Ubisoft
- Directors: Jean-Christophe Guyot; Thomas Simon
- Producer: Vincent Pontbriand
- Programmers: David Robillard; Jean-Philippe Harvey
- Artist: Mickael Labatt
- Writers: Jean-Sébastien Decant; Ian Ryan; Kevin Shortt
- Composer: Jason Graves
- Series: Far Cry
- Engine: Dunia 2
- Platforms: PlayStation 4; Xbox One; Windows; Google Stadia
- Release: PlayStation 4, Xbox One; February 23, 2016; Windows; March 1, 2016; Google Stadia; May 17, 2022
- Genre: First-person shooter
- Mode: Single-player

Far Cry Primal is a 2016 first-person shooter game developed by Ubisoft Montreal and published by Ubisoft. It is the ninth installment in the Far Cry series. Set during prehistoric times, the game follows the story of Takkar, who starts off as an unarmed hunter but will rise to become the leader of a tribe, using his special gift of taming animals. Primal adapts the traditional Far Cry formula to its prehistoric setting, replacing modern firearms with primitive weapons like spears, clubs, and bows and arrows, and allowing players to summon animal companions during battles. Everyday survival is a key aspect of the gameplay, as players have to watch out for both natural predators and rival tribesmen.

Far Cry Primal was released worldwide for the PlayStation 4 and Xbox One on February 23, 2016, Windows on March 1, 2016, and for Google Stadia on May 17, 2022. It received generally positive reviews from critics, who praised the concept, setting, world design, and the animal-taming mechanic. Criticism targeted the limited choice of weapons, the story, and what was considered a lack of innovation.

== Gameplay ==
In Far Cry Primal, the player can tame animals for use in combat.

Far Cry Primal is a first-person shooter game set in an open world environment. As the game is set in prehistoric times, the traditional gunplay and vehicle gameplay featured in the Far Cry series were removed, and the player can only get access to melee weapons such as spears, clubs and ranged weapons such as bows and slings. The player cannot purchase weapons and must craft them using the materials scavenged in the world such as wood and stone. As the player progresses, they can craft more lethal weapons with a larger variety of resources.

Besides facing natural dangers, the player must also compete with other hostile tribes occupying the area. By attacking and seizing bonfires and camps, the Wenja tribe will move in and begin patrolling the nearby region, and the player will gain fast travel points as well as camps to rest in. Non-player characters will also task the player to rescue tribe-mates and perform other tasks which improve the village, as well as provide free crafting materials. The game also features a dynamic weather system and day-night cycle, which affects the gameplay. At night, more predators are present, and many become more aggressive and dangerous, whereas during the day, the player can gather food and scavenge other resources such as tools for hunting. The player can also make use of fire as a tool for personal protection or hunting at night.

The player can bait different wildlife in the game using lures, and can also tame predators while they're feeding on the bait. These animals serve as a companion for the player and can assist them in combating enemies after being tamed, and can be summoned remotely and issued basic commands. Larger animals such as sabertooth cats can be used as mounts. Takkar has an owl, his spirit animal which can be directly controlled. Through the owl's vision, the player can scout enemies' outposts and highlight enemies. Through skill improvements, the owl can be upgraded to have various abilities added, such as diving to kill an enemy or dropping bombs.

In a post-launch update, a survival mode, which drastically increases the game's difficulty, was introduced.

== Synopsis ==
=== Setting ===
The game is set in 10,000 BC during the end of the Upper Paleolithic and beginning of the Mesolithic period in Europe, today’s Slovakia. It takes place in the fictional Oros valley in the Carpathian Mountains of Central and Eastern Europe (although some in-game mountains can be easily recognized as the Tre Cime di Lavaredo located in north-east Italy), an open world filled with different types of flora and fauna. A large portion of the game's map consists of modified regions from Kyrat, the fictional Himalayan country featured in Far Cry 4, specifically South Kyrat and a small part of north-western North Kyrat. Unlike previous games, there is prehistoric wildlife such as woolly mammoths, dire wolves, cave bears, cave lions, woolly rhinos, brontotherium, Irish elk and saber-toothed cats along with forms of modern creatures like brown bears, badgers, and deer. Survival is a daily challenge as tribes come into conflict with one another and nature.

Players take on the role of a Wenja tribesman named Takkar (Elias Toufexis), who is stranded in Oros with no weapons after his hunting party is ambushed by a saber-tooth tiger. Takkar, using his newfound skill of taming animals, will eventually rise to power and lead the Wenja to dominate all of Oros.

=== Plot ===
Takkar, a hunter from the Wenja tribe, is the only survivor after his hunting party is ambushed and killed by a sabertooth, cutting him off from the rest of his kin. Resigned to proceed alone, Takkar meets Sayla (Cara Ricketts), a Wenja gatherer whose life he saves, and once they arrive at Oros, Sayla informs Takkar that the Wenja are scattered and homeless across the land after their village was destroyed by Ull (DeLaRosa Rivera), leader of the Neanderthal-like Udam tribe who live in the northern mountains, prize warfare and hunting, and frequently kidnap Wenja to cannibalize them. Takkar then starts gathering the Wenja he meets around his cave, eventually encountering the wolf shaman Tensay (Terrence C. Carson), who helps him to learn the ability to tame the local animals. Tensay dubs Takkar the "Beast Master" for his skill.

After repelling an Udam attack led by Ull on his newly established village, Takkar enlists the help of three other skilled Wenja: Jayma (Ayisha Issa), a veteran huntress, Wogah (Ron Kennell), a one-armed craftsman, and Karoosh (Nicolas Van Burek), a one-eyed warrior with his own vendetta against the Udam. With the help of Tensay, Takkar discovers that the Udam are eating Wenja flesh in hopes of gaining immunity from a terminal genetic disease, the "skull fire", that is wiping out their tribe, then tracks down and apprehends the Udam commander Dah (Juan Carlos Velis) to learn more about the Udam's techniques. Several Wenja reject Takkar's decision to give shelter to an Udam warrior at first, and take him to a cave to be executed by drowning, until Takkar himself arrives in time to rescue Dah and chastise the tribe for disobeying him, earning Dah's gratitude and help. When the agrarian, ritualistic Izila, another, more advanced tribe that lives in the marshlands of southern Oros, begin capturing Wenja prisoners for slavery and human sacrifice to the Sun goddess Suxli, Takkar invades their domains to rescue them, coming face to face with their leader Batari (Debra Wilson). After he refuses to become Batari's slave, a war begins between the Wenja and Izila. Takkar then infiltrates the camp of an Izila commander named Roshani (Ali Momen) and captures him, allowing him to live in exchange for sharing Izila technology in both warfare and agriculture.

After preparing himself enough to face Ull and Batari, Takkar storms the Udam and Izila's main fortresses, passing by all opposition before confronting and killing their commanders. While the defiant Batari is burned alive during a solar eclipse, Ull urges Takkar to take care of his two children with his dying breath, which Takkar accepts, taking them with him back to his village. With both rival tribes defeated and Wenja dominance secured, Roshani agrees to stay with the Wenja and teach them how to grow food, while Takkar reluctantly agrees to mercifully kill Dah, ending his suffering from disease. Takkar then joins Sayla and Tensay in a celebration of his victory with the other villagers.

In the post-credits, Ull's daughter appears taming a cave bear, implying that she has acquired Takkar's animal taming skills.

== Development ==
The development of Far Cry Primal was led by Ubisoft Montreal, with assistance provided by Ubisoft Toronto, Ubisoft Kyiv and Ubisoft Shanghai. When asked about whether Far Cry 4 would feature standalone content like Far Cry 3 with Blood Dragon, creative director Alex Hutchinson declared that a sequel to the game would not be happening, but that they were planning something that could "surprise" players. On January 5, 2015, Ubisoft released a survey and asked players about potential future Far Cry settings. The survey includes themes like vampires, zombies, dinosaurs, a post-apocalyptic world, historical warfare and modern days locations like Peru and Alaska.

It was first added to the Steam database under its codename Far Cry Sigma on October 2, 2015, causing confusion for both fans and press. However, on October 6, 2015, Ubisoft held a stream revealing their next project. It was announced a day later, though it was leaked by IGN Turkey several hours before the official announcement. The game's creative director is Jean-Christophe Guyot, who has worked on several Prince of Persia games. On December 3, 2015, creative director Maxime Béland stated that Far Cry Primal was as big as Far Cry 4. The game does not feature a multiplayer mode. The decision was made during the early stages of the game's development as they wanted to focus on the game's core gameplay instead.

Far Cry Primal released for the PlayStation 4 and Xbox One on February 23, 2016. The Windows version was released shortly afterwards on March 1, 2016. The game has two different special editions, both of which cost more than the base game. The Collector's Edition features additional physical items such as a steelbook, a collector's book, a map of Oros, the game's original soundtrack and a Wenja phrasebook, which serves as a guide for players to learn the language used in the game. The Digital Apex Edition, which can only be purchased digitally, and the Collector's Edition contain digital content such as extra in-game missions, weapons and additional packs. The game runs on an upgraded version of the Dunia 2 engine from Far Cry 4.

In January 2026 Ubisoft released a patch for Far Cry Primal which boosted the framerate to 60fps on the PlayStation 5 and Xbox Series X/S for the PlayStation 4 and Xbox One versions of the game.

=== Language ===
The characters speak a fictional language with a defined syntax and structure. It is based on the reconstructed Proto-Indo-European language, which is the theorized common ancestor of most modern European languages and some languages in Asia and the Middle East. Linguists constructed three dialects — Wenja, Udam and Izila — one for each of the three featured tribes. Each dialect was designed to have a distinct sound conveying the culture of its tribe. Lead writer Kevin Shortt said that players are able to understand Wenja vocabulary, and finish the game with "a real sense of it".

Mexican vocalist and composer Malukah was among the voice actors providing war cries and other vocal effects to the game.

=== Soundtrack ===
The soundtrack of Far Cry Primal was created with percussion instruments, stone, clay, and an Aztec death whistle. The soundtrack was composed by Jason Graves. The tribes the player encounters have their own distinct music profiles. The Wenja tribe features ram's horn and solo flute, while the Izilia features Aztec death whistles, female vocals and ritualistic percussion.

== Reception ==
Reception

Aggregate score
Aggregator	Score
Metacritic	(PC) 74/100 (PS4) 76/100 (XONE) 77/100

Review scores
Publication	Score
Destructoid	7/10
Electronic Gaming Monthly	7/10
Game Informer	8.75/10
GameRevolution	4/5
GameSpot	8/10
GamesRadar+	3/5
IGN	7.9/10
Polygon	8.5/10
VideoGamer.com	7/10

According to the review aggregator website Metacritic, the Windows version of Far Cry Primal received "mixed or average" reviews from critics upon release, while the PlayStation 4 and Xbox One versions received "generally favorable" reviews.

Destructoid's Kyle MacGregor spoke positively about how the game depicts violence towards animals and the survival aspects in general, saying that they were designed with realism in mind. He also felt that the animal companion mechanic was one of the game's strongest elements, saying that it has "limitless potential". In regard to the choice of setting, he felt it was a welcome and natural evolution in the Far Cry series. However, he described the story as being familiar and predictable and said that, even with the drastic change of setting, the Far Cry formula isn't as innovative as it once was.

Matt Buchholtz of Electronic Gaming Monthly wrote, "The graphics are stunning—Ubisoft has truly mastered facial animations and lighting effects." He added, "The game feels like a full-priced reskin of Far Cry 4, without the engaging storyline", finishing with, "Far Cry Primal really wants you to know that there are tons of things you can do in its prehistoric, open world. Unfortunately, you may not want to do any of them."

Jeff Cork from Game Informer praised the setting for allowing for gameplay and story elements with more realism, specifically in regard to the protagonist not being a stereotype young male who inexplicably has advanced combat knowledge. He called the visuals and world design "beautiful", and said that the decision to use a primitive language made specifically for the game was "effective". Lastly, Cork wrote: "Players who associate Far Cry with explosions and massive gunfights might find the setting disappointing, but it's one of my favorite entries in the series yet."

Matt Utley of GameRevolution called Far Cry Primal a "breath of fresh air for both the franchise and first-person action games in general". He praised the decision to remove guns and motorized vehicles for enabling more dynamic gameplay, called the graphics "lush" and "evocative", and, like others, commended the bold setting change. Utley's critiques were minor; he disliked some aspects of the control scheme, found that the quieter moments of the game were drowned-out by aggressive enemies, and felt that not enough improvements and fixes were made to the basic Far Cry formula.

Mike Mahardy of GameSpot gave the game a mostly positive review, calling the setting its greatest strength. He praised the open world for being "cohesive" and "foreboding", enjoyed the "tense" focus on survival, and called the beast-taming mechanics "creative". Mahardy did feel as though there was a limited amount of weapons given to the player and disliked some of the gameplay for being "repetitive".

Joe Skrebels from GamesRadar was more critical of the game, summarizing his thoughts with: "Primal takes the great structure of the Far Cry series, but little of its character. No clear goal and a limited arsenal end up making this feel a little prehistoric itself." Skrebels too praised the taming mechanic and the open world design.

Luke Reilly of IGN summarized his review with: "Far Cry Primal comes to the table with a quiver of neat ideas but it forgot to bring much of a story with it." Reilly thought the game's strongest aspects were created by its twist on the series' formula, highlighting the scavenging elements and the animal-taming mechanics. However, Reilly felt the drastic change for the series wasn't without its flaws, saying that the characters, quests, and overall story were a step back from the memorable moments of the previous games.

Polygon's Justin McElroy particularly praised the open world environment, calling it the "most immersive" in the series. He summarized his review by writing: "I don't want every Far Cry game from here on to trade bullets for arrows, motorcycles for tigers, but Primal is an invigorating example of how to re-imagine a tired franchise while keeping its soul intact."

Even though he described the game as being "very fun" and felt that the decision to develop a spin-off-type game in the series was a great one, Simon Miller from VideoGamer recognized that Far Cry Primal "doesn't do anything drastically new" for the series. He too praised the animal taming mechanic and the visuals.

=== Sales ===
The retail version of Far Cry Primal was the best selling game in its week of release in the UK, debuting at No. 1 in the UK retail software sales chart. It was also the best-selling game in the United States in February 2016. According to Ubisoft, the game performed better than they had expected, and that its release became the biggest launch of a game in February.
