= David J. Peterson =

American language creator (born 1981)

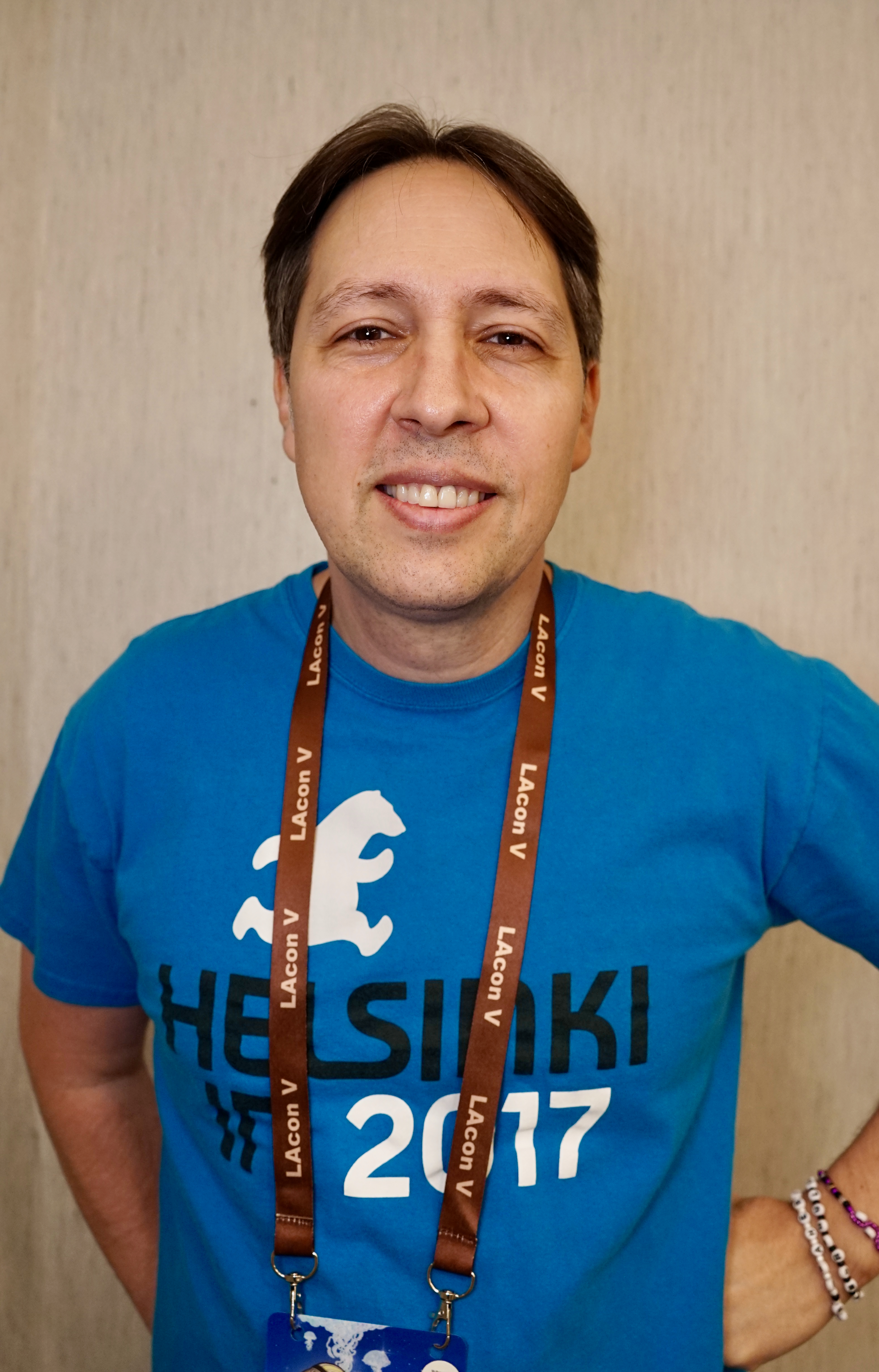
- Peterson at Worldcon 2026
- Born: David Joshua Peterson; January 20, 1981 (age 45); Long Beach, California, U.S.
- Education: UC Berkeley (BA); UC San Diego (MA)
- Occupation: Language creator
- Known for: Creating Dothraki and Valyrian for Game of Thrones
- Spouses: Erin Peterson (divorced); Jessie Peterson (m. 2023)
- Children: 1
- Website: artoflanguageinvention.com

David Joshua Peterson (born January 20, 1981) is an American language creator. He came to prominence after creating the Dothraki and Valyrian languages for the television series Game of Thrones. He has subsequently worked on a number of other projects, including the films Dune and Dune: Part Two, for which he created the Chakobsa language. He has written a book on language construction entitled The Art of Language Invention.

== Life ==
=== Early life ===
David Joshua Peterson was born in Long Beach, California, on January 20, 1981, to a father of German descent and a mother of Mexican descent. Studying at University of California, Berkeley (1999–2003), Peterson received BA degrees in English and in linguistics. He received an MA in linguistics from University of California, San Diego (2003–2006). He had his first contact with constructed languages while still at Berkeley, after attending an Esperanto class in 2000.

=== Language creation ===
In 2007, he co-founded the Language Creation Society with nine other language creators and served as its president (2011–2014).

In 2009, the television network HBO needed a fictional language (Dothraki) for the Game of Thrones television series and turned to the Language Creation Society for help. This resulted in a contest, which Peterson won.

He produced a number of videos on YouTube, in a series called The Art of Language Invention, and published a book of the same title in 2015. Peterson also worked as an executive producer on the 2017 documentary film, Conlanging: The Art of Crafting Tongues.

In 2019, Peterson created a free High Valyrian course on the Duolingo website/app and expanded the course in conjunction with the House of the Dragon series premiere in August 2022.

== Personal life ==
Peterson was previously married to Erin Peterson, but the marriage ended in divorce. They had one daughter together. In 2023, Peterson became engaged to and subsequently married linguist and fellow conlanger Jessie Peterson (formerly Sams).

== Languages created ==
=== Television ===
Year	Title	Language(s) / role
2011–2019	Game of Thrones	Dothraki (Lekh Dothraki), the language of the eponymous people; High Valyrian (Valyrio Udrir), a literary language once spoken in Valyria; Astapori Valyrian, a descendant of High Valyrian spoken in Astapor; Meereenese Valyrian, a descendant of High Valyrian spoken in Meereen; Mag Nuk ("great tongue"), the language of giants. It was only used for one line.; Skroth ("ice"), an unused language that was meant to be spoken by the White Walkers; Asshai, an unused language that was meant to be spoken by the Asshai'i; Lhazareen, an unused sister language of Dothraki that was meant to be spoken by the eponymous people; Gerna Mohr (or Gerna Moussha), an unused language that was meant to be spoken by the Children of the Forest
2013–2015	Defiance	Castithan (Kastíthanu), the language of the eponymous species. It has its own abugida called Fajizwalino.; Irathient (Thwelu l'Irathi), the language of the eponymous species. It has its own abugida called Izra.; Indojisnen, the language of Indogenes. It has its own syllabary called Hazugimari.; Kinuk'aaz ("our language"), the language of the Omec. It has its own alphabet called Zaduusel.; Yanga Kayang, an unused language that was meant to be the Liberata's
2014	Star-Crossed	Sondiv, the language of the Atrians. It has its own abjad called Kwandon.
2014–2015	Dominion	Lishepus, a language invented by the angels to prevent humans from understanding them. It is based on Proto-Indo-European and Proto-Afroasiatic roots. Peterson also translated a few lines into Akkadian for one episode.
2015–2020	The 100	Trigedasleng ("forest language") or Trig, the language of the Grounders. It is a descendant of a cryptolect based on American English.; Ripasleng ("Reaper language"), the language of the Reapers, a modified version of Trigedasleng with additional sound changes.
2015	Penny Dreadful	Verbis Diablo (or Verbis Diabolo), the language of witches and demons. Its vocabulary is based on Classical Arabic, Akkadian, Middle Egyptian, Attic Greek, Latin, Persian and Turkish.
2016	Face Off	Guest judge
2016–2017	The Shannara Chronicles	Noalath ("great tongue"), the language of druids
2017	Emerald City	Inha ("we"), the language of witches. It has four varieties (referencing the four countries of the Land of Oz), called Water Inha, Fire Inha, Wind Inha and Stone Inha.; Munja'kin, the language of the eponymous people
2017	The Defenders	Written Tibetan translation
2018	Into the Badlands	Azrán, a descendant of Mexican Spanish spoken in Azra
2018	Iron Fist	Written Tibetan translation
2019, 2021	Another Life	Achaian, Tala and Decuma, three asemic syllabaries. Peterson worked on this show with Claire Ng.
2019, 2021, 2023, 2025	The Witcher	Hen Linge ("elder speech"), the language of elves and mages. It has its own alphabet called Hen Wökina.
2019	Euphoria	Dothraki lines
2020–2022	Motherland: Fort Salem	Méníshè ("mother tongue"), the language of witches. A language derived from Méníshè and spoken by Camarilla members was also used for one line, and an ancient form of Méníshè appears in season 3. Peterson created all three languages with Jessie Peterson.
2020	Lovecraft Country	Language of Adam. Peterson created a writing system for this show in collaboration with Claire Ng, but it was not used.
2021	Mr. Mayor	Dothraki lines. Uncredited.
2021, 2023	Shadow and Bone	Ravkan (Ravkaye Vyechost), the language of Ravka, which mainly appears in writing as it is rendered as English in most of the scenes where it is spoken. It has its own alphabet called Im Shaliloriyi. An older form of Ravkan was also used for one line.; Fjerdan, the language of Fjerda. Peterson created this language with Christian Thalmann.; Kerch, the abugida of Kerch. It does not have an associated conlang, instances of written Kerch are actually coded English texts.; Kerch sign language; Zemeni, the language of Novyi Zem. It has its own abugida called Isunuche Zemen. Peterson created this language with Jessie Peterson.; Shu, the language of Shu Han. It has its own alphabet called Shighraad Shu. Peterson created this language with Jessie Peterson, and its writing system was created by Christian Thalmann.
2022	From	Background dialogue lines for the creatures. Peterson worked on this show with Jessie Peterson, both are uncredited.
2022, 2024	Halo	Sangheili, the language of the Covenant. Peterson created this language with Carl Buck.
2022, 2024	House of the Dragon	High Valyrian lines, as well as a new logoconsonantal script called Nekesse Valyrio for this language
2022	Paper Girls	Kezhwa, a creole language spoken by time travelers. It was only used for one line. Peterson created this language with Jessie Peterson, both are uncredited.
2022	Vampire Academy	Aazh Naamori ("Language of the Moroi"), the language of vampires. It has its own abugida. Peterson created this language with Jessie Peterson.
2022	The Witcher: Blood Origin	Hen Linge lines and texts
2026	A Knight of the Seven Kingdoms	Dothraki lines
2026	Lanterns	Qashew, the language of Antaan's people. This language was created by Jessie Peterson with assistance from David Peterson.

=== Films ===
Year	Title	Language(s) / role
2013	Thor: The Dark World	Shiväisith ("soft speech"), the language of the Dark Elves. It has its own alphabet called Todjydheenil, which was not used in the film, Peterson invented it after the film was released.
2016	Warcraft: The Beginning	Orcish, the language of orcs; Draenei, the language of the eponymous species that was only used for one line; Common, an unused language that was meant to be the humans'
2016	The Bad Batch	Dialect coach
2016	Doctor Strange	Nelvayu, a demonic language the Zealots use for incantations
2017	Conlanging: The Art of Crafting Tongues	Executive producer
2017	Bright	Övüsi (Övüsi Kieru, "Elvish tongue"), the language of elves. It has its own abugida. An older form of Övüsi was also used for one line.; Bodzvokhan (Bodzvokhan Dǝzhn, "farmer's language"), the language of orcs. It has its own abjad called Vukht as well as a Cyrillic alphabet.
2018, 2020	The Christmas Chronicles; The Christmas Chronicles 2	Yulish, the language of Santa Claus and the Christmas elves
2021	Raya and the Last Dragon	Kumandran, the language of Kumandra. It was only used for one line and a few untranslated words in English lines.
2021	The Witcher: Nightmare of the Wolf	Hen Linge lines and texts
2021, 2024	Dune; Dune: Part Two	Chakobsa, the language of the Fremen, as well as the corresponding sign language. It has its own abugida called Dinlih.; Sardaukar, the language of the eponymous force. It was only used for meaningless chants.; House Atreides' sign language
2023	Elemental	Firish (Tsʼítsʼàsh), the language of the fire elements. It has its own syllabary called Ká Khìkhùftò, which was not used in most of the film as a different alphabet was also used more often to write coded English. Peterson created this language with Jessie Peterson.
2025	The Witcher: Sirens of the Deep	Roozh Linge ("deep speech"), a sister language of Hen Linge spoken by merfolk. Peterson created this language with Jessie Peterson.
2025	Superman	Suh Ankripton ("Voice of Krypton"), the language of the Kryptonians. It has its own abugida called Gwazaks Ankripton. Peterson created this language with Jessie Peterson.
2026	Project Hail Mary	Eridian, the musical language used by the Eridians. Peterson created this language with Jessie Peterson. Most if not all of it went unused in the film.
2026	Supergirl	Suh Ankripton lines and texts; Bíeki, the language of planet Bilquis; Iskwari, the language of the Sklarians; Ud Briggan, the language of the Brigands. This language was created by Jessie Peterson with assistance from David Peterson.

=== Video games ===
Year	Title	Language(s)
2018	Arena of Valor	Veda, the language of the inhabitants of Veda. It has its own abjad called Welqor ("stack-mark").; Afata, a descendant of Veda spoken by the eponymous people. It has its own abugida called Thala ("vine").; Gandal ("impure language"), a descendant of Veda spoken by humans. It has its own alphabet called Shul ("pure").; G'vunna (Zudǝllǝ g’Vunnǝ, "language from the abyss"), a descendant of Veda spoken by Lokheim. It has its own alphabet called Oz ("blade").; The scripts were only made for promotional purposes; none of them were used in the game.

=== Operas ===
Year	Title	Language(s)
2017, 2019	Vōv (Eduardo Reck Miranda); Lampedusa (Eduardo Reck Miranda)	Vōv ("love"), a language spoken on Ariel's island

=== Musicals ===
Year	Title	Language(s)
2021	WeCameToDance (Food Tank)	Hanyana, a language spoken by aliens from the eponymous planet

=== Stage plays ===
Year	Title	Language(s)
2026	Game of Thrones: The Mad King	High Valyrian lines

=== Books ===
Year	Title	Language(s)
2014, 2017	The Zaanics Deceit; The Zaanics Pursuit	Væyne Zaanics ("God's gift" or "God's curse"), a secret language invented by the Lyrs and the Severns It has its own cipher alphabet called Yesuþoh. Peterson created this language with Nina Post.

== Publications ==
- Johnston, Susan; Battis, Jes (2015). Mastering the Game of Thrones: Essays on George R. R. Martin's A Song of Ice and Fire. McFarland & Company. ISBN 978-0-7864-9631-0.
- Peterson, David J. (2014). Dothraki. Living Language. ISBN 978-0-8041-6086-5.
- —— (2015). The Art of Language Invention. Penguin Books. ISBN 978-0-14-312646-1.
- —— (2020). Create Your Own Secret Language: Invent Codes, Ciphers, Hidden Messages, and More. Odd Dot. ISBN 978-1250222329.
- Post, Nina; Peterson, David J. (2014). The Zaanics Deceit (Cate Lyr) (Volume 1). Nina Post, LLC. ISBN 978-1-4954-6134-7.
- Post, Nina; Peterson, David J. (2017). The Zaanics Pursuit (Cate Lyr) (Volume 2). Nina Post, LLC. ISBN 978-1-5376-4745-6.
