= Kiliki language =

Fictional language

Kiliki
- Pronunciation: [kɪɫɪkɪ]
- Created by: Madhan Karky
- Date: 2015
- Setting and usage: Baahubali
- Purpose: Constructed languages: Artistic languages; Fictional languages; Kiliki

Language codes
- ISO 639-3: qkk (local use)
- Glottolog: None
- IETF: art-x-kiliki (local use)

Kiliki or Kilikili is a fictional language originally created by Madhan Karky for the 2015 Indian epic action film Baahubali: The Beginning. It has 3000 words and is written using 22 symbols. In February 2020 on International Mother Language Day, the film's director SS Rajamouli launched the official website of Kiliki. It reportedly has 40 grammar rules but the grammar section of the website is empty.

== Usage ==
In the film Baahubali: The Beginning, the Kalakeya tribe speak Kiliki. After the success of the film in December 2015, singer Smita released "Baha Kiliki", the first song in Kiliki language, onto YouTube. It has over 170 million views. In 2017, it was used in the film Baahubali 2: The Conclusion, the sequel of Baahubali: The Beginning.

The fictional language Kiliki (also referred to as Kilikili) spoken by the Kalakeyas, a ferocious warrior tribe, was created by Madhan Karky for the film. It is said to be the first fictional language to be created for Indian film.

While Karky was pursuing a PhD in Australia, he took up a part-time job of teaching and baby-sitting children. During one such interaction, he thought it would be fun to create a new language that could be easily grasped. Basic words were first made up and opposites were represented by word reversals – me was min and you was nim. The language, with 100 words, was called "Click" to highlight its simplicity. This formed the foundation for Kiliki.

- Kilikili consists of at least 750 words and more than 40 concrete grammar rules.
- It was designed to be an intuitive language: Karky said he used hard consonants and soft consonants depending on the nature of the words' meanings.
- The language was created keeping in mind that the Kalakeya warriors had to be portrayed as terrifying brutes.

On 21 February 2020, on the occasion of International Mother Language Day, Rajamouli launched the official website of Kiliki language. He called the language as "world's youngest and easiest language."
