= Artistic language =

Language constructed for aesthetic reasons

An artistic language, or artlang, is a constructed language designed for aesthetic and phonetic pleasure. Constructed languages can be artistic to the extent that artists use it as a source of creativity in art, poetry, calligraphy or as a metaphor to address themes such as cultural diversity and the vulnerability of the individual in a globalizing world. They can also be used to test linguistical theories, such as Linguistic relativity.

Unlike engineered languages or auxiliary languages, artistic languages often have irregular grammar systems, much like natural languages. Many are designed within the context of fictional worlds, such as J. R. R. Tolkien's Middle-earth. Others can represent fictional languages in a world not patently different from the real world, or have no particular fictional background attached.

== Genres ==
Several different genres of constructed languages are classified as 'artistic'. An artistic language may fall into any one of the following groups, depending on the aim of its use. Similarly to philosophical languages, artlangs are created in accordance with an initially defined principle in mind.

=== Fictional languages ===
By far the largest group of artlangs are fictional languages (sometimes also referred to as "professional artlangs"). Fictional languages are intended to be the languages of a fictional world, and are often designed with the intent of giving more depth and an appearance of plausibility to the fictional worlds with which they are associated, and to have their characters communicate in a fashion which is both alien and dislocated. By analogy with the word "conlang", the term conworld is used to describe these worlds, inhabited by fictional constructed cultures.

There are two major categories of fictional languages.

Professional fictional languages are those languages created for use in books, movies, television shows, video games, comics, toys, and songs. Prominent examples of settings featuring fictional languages include Arda and the Star Trek universe, Simlish in The Sims, games like Ico and the Ar Tonelico series, and songs of the French band Magma, singing in Kobaïan.

Internet-based fictional languages are hosted along with their "conworlds" on the Internet, and based at these sites, becoming known to the world through the sites' visitors. An example is Verdurian, the language of Mark Rosenfelder's Verduria on the planet of Almea.

=== Alternative languages ===
Alternative languages, or altlangs, speculate on an alternate history and try to reconstruct how a family of natural languages would have evolved if things had been different, e.g.: What if Greek civilization had gone on to thrive without a Roman Empire, leaving Greek and not Latin to develop several modern descendants? The language that would have evolved is then traced step by step in its evolution, to reach its modern form. An altlang will typically base itself on the core vocabulary of one language and the phonology of another.

The best-known language of this category is Brithenig, which initiated the interest among Internet conlangers in devising such alternate-historical languages, like Wenedyk. Brithenig attempts to determine how Romance languages would have evolved had Roman influence in Britain been sufficient to replace Celtic languages with Vulgar Latin, and bases its phonology on that of Welsh. An earlier instance is Philip José Farmer's Winkie language, a relative of the Germanic languages spoken by the Winkies of Oz in A Barnstormer in Oz. Another example is Anglish, which tries to reconstruct how English could have looked without Latin influence.

Although technically a professional fictional language, Wenja, used in the video game Far Cry Primal is an attempt an reconstructing an earlier stage of Proto-Indo-European, before the appearance of characteristics such as gender, ablaut or the s-mobile, to name a few.

=== Micronational languages ===
Micronational languages are the languages created for use in micronations. Having the citizens learn the language is as much a part of participating in the micronation as minting coins and stamps or participating in government. The members of these micronations meet up and speak the language they have learned when they are participating in these meets. They coin new words and grammatical constructions when needed. Talossan, from R. Ben Madison's Kingdom of Talossa, is an archetypal example of a micronational language.

=== Personal languages ===
Personal languages are ultimately created for one's own edification. The creator does not expect anyone to speak it; the language exists as a work of art. A personal language may be invented for the purpose of having a beautiful language, for self-expression, as an exercise in understanding linguistic principles, or perhaps as an attempt to create a language with an extreme phonemic inventory or system of verbs. Personal languages tend to have short lifespans, and are often displayed on the Internet and discussed on message boards much like Internet-based fictional languages. They are often invented in large numbers by the people who design these languages. However, a few personal languages are used extensively and long-term by their creators (e.g., for writing diaries). Javant Biarujia, the creator of Taneraic, described his personal language (which he terms a hermetic language) thus: "a private pact negotiated between the world at large and the world within me; public words simply could not guarantee me the private expression I sought." The author Robert Dessaix describes the origins of his personal language K: "I wanted words that described reality. So I made them up."

=== Languages with small vocabulary ===
The aim of such languages is to express deep meaning with very few parts. For instance, Toki Pona is generally said to have around 120, 123, or 125 root words and 14 phonemes. It was created by Canadian linguist and translator Sonja Lang for the purpose of simplifying thoughts and communication.

The fictional language used in the film Kin-dza-dza! (1986) features only eleven words (a list briefly appears on the screen), of which ku serves as a generic placeholder when the ten others do not fit.

=== Experimental languages ===
An experimental language is a constructed language designed for the purpose of exploring some theory of linguistics. Most such languages are concerned with the relation between language and thought; however, languages have been constructed to explore other aspects of language as well. In science fiction, much work has been done on the assumption popularly known as the Sapir–Whorf hypothesis. Artlangs of this type overlap with engineered languages.

== See also ==
- Asemic writing
- Constructed language
- Engineered language
- Esoteric programming language
- Idioglossia
- International auxiliary language
- Language game
- Mystical language
