= Zompist.com =

Website

- Available in: en
- Creator: Mark "Zompist" Rosenfelder
- Website: www.zompist.com
- Commercial: No
- Registration: None
- Launched: 1996
- Current status: Active

Zompist.com is a website created by Mark Rosenfelder a.k.a. Zompist, a conlanger. It features essays on comics, politics, language, and science, as well as a detailed description of Rosenfelder's constructed world, Almea. The website is also the home of The Language Construction Kit, Rosenfelder's article introducing new conlangers to the hobby.

Many features of the site have been noted by the press, including its culture tests, humorous excerpts from phrase books, its collection of numbers in over 5000 languages, and The Language Construction Kit.

== The Language Construction Kit ==
Books by Mark Rosenfelder

The Language Construction Kit was originally a collection of HTML documents written by Rosenfelder and hosted at Zompist.com intended to be a guide for making constructed languages. The LCK proceeds from the simplest aspects of language upward, starting with phonology and writing systems, moving on to words, going through the complexities of grammar, and ending with an overview of registers and dialects. This sensible progression, as well as the warnings against common oversights, frequent use of examples from natural languages, and healthy dose of humor, has earned the LCK its popular and respected status among the Internet conlanging community. It has been translated into Spanish, Portuguese, Italian, and German by fans, and came out in book form in March 2010. Rosenfelder has published several follow-up works: Advanced Language Construction and The Conlanger's Lexipedia, which get into more detail on certain aspects of conlanging, and The Planet Construction Kit, which is geared towards creating whole fantasy worlds. In 2015, Rosenfelder published the China Construction Kit.

== The Zompist Bulletin Board ==
The website has a corresponding bulletin board, formerly hosted with SpinnWebe but now with its own domain at www.verduria.org. The Zompist Bulletin Board (often abbreviated ZBB) is an online forum created for the purpose of discussing conlangs, conworlds, and Mark Rosenfelder's own constructed world, Almea. Members of the board share and showcase their own conlangs and conworlds, as well as discuss aspects of the world's languages.

== Almea ==
Almea is a fictional world constructed by Mark Rosenfelder, which Zompist.com is mainly dedicated to. It is populated by several races, known as the Thinking Kinds. The Thinking kinds include the humans, the ktuvoks (swamp mammals with reptile characteristics considered demons by most Almean humans), the iliî (singular form iliu, ancient wise aquatic race, playing a role similar to elves in Tolkien's mythos), the flaids (said to be 'friendly but insane'), the elcari (hard-working mountain dwellers comparable to Tolkien's dwarves), and the icëlani (more primitive relatives of humans). Almea's main continent, Ereláe, has several nations, including Verduria, which is the most detailed and closest Almean counterpart to real-life countries, Dhekhnam, which is a ktuvok empire (meaning that humans function as slaves to the ktuvoks there), Xurno, a nation ruled by artists, and Skouras, a detailed maritime nation. Ereláe also has a detailed historical atlas, which was inspired by the New Penguin Historical Atlases. In addition to the various atlases and languages, there is also a wiki called the Almeopedia, which works as an encyclopedic reference. The part of the website devoted to Almea, Virtual Verduria, also includes a range of stories and guides to various subjects, including drawing and maps.

Languages of Almea described on the website include:

- Verdurian
- Ismaîn
- Barakhinei
- Caďinor
- Sarroc
- Cuêzi
- Axunašin
- Xurnese
- Proto-Eastern
- Kebreni
- Munkhâshi
- Wede:i
- Old Skourene
- Elkarîl
- Flaidish
- Uyseʔ
- Lé
- Dhekhnami
- Obenzayet
- Bhöɣetan
- Šɯk

Most words in those languages have etymologies, being derived from proto-languages (like Proto-Eastern above) by means of sound changes, and are given historical backgrounds, resulting in the presence of loan-words.

== See also ==
- Langmaker
