= BZ =

BZ may refer to:

== Chemistry ==
- Belousov–Zhabotinsky reaction, example of non-equilibrium thermodynamics
- 3-Quinuclidinyl benzilate, an odorless military incapacitating agent with NATO code BZ
- Benzimidazole, an aromatic compound and parasiticide
- Benzodiazepines, a class of psychoactive drugs
- Benzoyl, group (Bz), C_{6}H_{5}-CO-, a functional group: acyl derived from benzoic acid
- Bronze, an alloy consisting of (Cu) Copper and (Sn) tin
- Benzscaline, a serotonin receptor agonist and possible serotonergic psychedelic

== Entertainment ==
- B'z, a Japanese musical group
- Blue Zone (band), credited as "B.Z." for the 1998 cover of the song "Jackie" by Joanne Accom
- Beyond Zork, a computer game released by Infocom in 1987
- Border Zone (video game)

== Periodicals ==
- Badische Zeitung, Freiburg(Germany)
- Braunschweiger Zeitung, Braunschweig
- B.Z. (newspaper), Berlin
- Berliner Zeitung, also Berlin
- Berner Zeitung, Bern
- Byzantinische Zeitschrift, a German academic journal

== Places ==
- Bautzen, Germany (vehicle registration code BZ)
- Belize (ISO 3166-1 2-letter country code)
- Province of Bolzano or South Tyrol, Italy (vehicle registration code BZ)
- Brazil (World Meteorological Organization country code)
- Buitenzorg or Bogor, West Java province, Indonesia
- Buzău, Romania (vehicle registration code BZ)

== Technology ==
- .bz, the country code top-level domain for Belize
- bzip2, an algorithm for data compression
- Bugzilla, a web-based error tracker and testing tool
- Busy, in Internet slang (from the pronunciation "bee-zee")
- Toyota bZ series, a family of electric vehicles

== Other uses ==
- Bobby Zamora (born 1981), English footballer nicknamed 'BZ'
- Bravo Zulu, a naval signal meaning 'well done'
- Brent Crude, a trading classification of crude oil (futures trading symbol BZ on the NYMEX exchange)
- Brillouin zone, in mathematics and solid-state physics, a uniquely defined primitive cell in reciprocal space
- Blue Dart Aviation (IATA airline code), a cargo airline based in Chennai, India & Kolkata, India
- Keystone Air Service (1985-2015, IATA airline code), an airline that served Manitoba, Canada
- Squatting movement, in Danish slang, from the word "besæt" ("occupiers")

== See also ==
- Battlezone (disambiguation)
- Bzzz (disambiguation)
