= Bzzz =

Bzzz or Bzz may refer to:

== Bzzz ==
- Bzzz, a cross-linguistic onomatopoeia (the sound of a bee buzzing)
- Bzzz!, a relationship game show
- Bzzz!, an exhibit from Copernicus Science Centre
- Bzzz, a Gaelic children's television series
- "Bzzz", an episode of Zoboomafoo

== Bzz ==
- "Bzz..", a song by Bzikebi
- RAF Brize Norton, IATA code BZZ

== See also ==
- Bee, an insect that makes a bzzz sound
- Wasp, an insect that makes a bzzz sound
- Bzzzpeek, a website designed to appeal young children
- Buzz (disambiguation)
- BZ (disambiguation)
- Zzz (disambiguation)
