= BZ-1 =

BZ-1 may refer to:

- Bowlus BZ-1, an American glider
- BŻ-1 GIL, a Polish experimental helicopter
- BZ1, a 1983 album by Bezobrazno Zeleno
- An-12BZ-1, an Antonov An-12 variant aircraft

== See also ==
- BZ (disambiguation)
- Belize dollar
