= Sarah Boxer =

American writer, critic, and cartoonist

Sarah Boxer is an American writer, cartoonist, and critic born in Denver, Colorado. Her critical essays and reviews have appeared in The Atlantic, The New York Review of Books, The Comics Journal, The New Yorker, Slate, Artforum, Bookforum, and The New York Times Book Review. At the New York Times (1989–2006), she was an editor for The Book Review and the Week in Review, a photography critic, a theater critic, a critic of arts and culture on the Web, and a culture reporter covering visual culture, philosophy, literature, psychoanalysis, and sex. She is the author and illustrator of four graphic novels.

== Career ==
=== Journalism ===
Boxer started her career in journalism as a science writer and editor, first at The Sciences, the magazine of the New York Academy of Sciences, then at Discover magazine. In the late 1980s she was a writer for Sports Illustrated and Sports Illustrated for Kids. In 1989, she became an editor at The New York Times Book Review, where she assigned and edited reviews of books on psychology, science, and nature.

In 1997 Boxer became a reporter on the Arts & Ideas page of The New York Times, where she covered the visual arts, philosophy, psychoanalysis, literature, feminism, animals, and sex. In that capacity, she was known for making complex concepts comprehensible, such as the nomenclature of military operations, the modern debate about Freud's Seduction Hypothesis, and David Hockney's theory that many Renaissance artists used optical devices to make their paintings. Boxer often practiced a kind of participatory journalism. For instance, she took the Mensa test in order to tell the world what it was like, and she once crawled inside the orgone box belonging to the cartoonist William Steig while interviewing him for his obituary. On the 75th anniversary of The New Yorker she penned a piece pretending to inhabit the magazine's famous pronoun, We.

Following the attacks of September 11, 2001, Boxer focused on the photography of that day and was one of the many New York Times reporters who composed short profiles of the victims, the Portraits of Grief. Her critical work, largely on memorials, photography, and video records, was nominated for a Pulitzer. While at The New York Times Boxer also wrote some notable obituaries, including on the philosopher G.E.M. Anscombe, on the director of the Sigmund Freud Archives, Kurt Eissler, and on the cartoonists Saul Steinberg and Charles Schulz.

=== Criticism ===
Boxer's career as a critic began on the editorial board of The Harvard Crimson, where she reviewed the movie The Europeans and "The Exhibit of Perfect" by the conceptual artist James Lee Byars. Her earliest book reviews were for The New York Times Book Review and The Village Voice. Beginning in 1995, she was The New York Times's photography critic for nearly a decade and interviewed Robert Frank and Helen Levitt.

Boxer began contributing to Artforum in 2001. Her pieces included an examination of the visual remains of September 11, a book review of Deirdre Bair's Saul Steinberg biography, and a consideration of "The Masters of American Comics" exhibition from a feminist perspective. An essay she wrote for Artforum on Lewis Carroll's photography, particularly his pictures of Alice Liddell, the model and muse for Alice's Adventures in Wonderland, led Boxer to an examination of the curious nature of Alices through modern history, including Alice B. Toklas, Alice James, Alice Roosevelt Longworth, Alice Coltrane and Alice Neel, a topic on which she delivered a lecture to the Lewis Carroll Society of North America.

From 2004 to 2006, Boxer served as the New York Times's first and last critic of arts and culture on the Web, bringing readers a digital version of Christo's Gates, the confessional website known as PostSecret, the topic of politically motivated online vandalism, an audio site devoted to onomatopoeia called Bzzzpeek, and a new online religion devoted to the Flying Spaghetti Monster. In a critic's notebook headlined "Art of the Internet: A Protest Song, Reloaded," about the musical mashups following Hurricane Katrina, Boxer explored how the meaning of Green Day's "Wake Me Up When September Ends," was forever altered.

After leaving the Times, Boxer edited the anthology Ultimate Blogs: Masterworks from the Wild Web (Vintage Books, 2008) and started writing critical essays and reviews for The New York Review of Books, The Atlantic, Slate, The Comics Journal, The New Yorker, The Los Angeles Review of Books, The Wall Street Journal, and Bookforum.

=== Essays ===
At The Atlantic Boxer writes cultural criticism. She wrote, for example, about the circus around Yayoi Kusama's Infinity Mirror rooms and the public's craze for participatory art, and she documented the experience of reading all of Marcel Proust's In Search of Lost Timeon her cellphone. Her catalogue essay, "Ripped From the Headlines," which she wrote for "Shock of the News," a National Gallery of Art exhibition about the use of newspapers in art, homed in on the violence and envy often displayed in this art. In "Flogging Freud," an essay for The New York Times Book Review about the Freud Wars, she analyzed the many contradictory ways that "Freud has proved to be a great whipping boy for our time."

A number of Boxer's writings have been anthologized. Her New York Review of Books piece on the creator of Krazy Kat, George Herriman, "His Inner Cat," appeared in Best American Comics Criticism as "The Cat In the Hat." Her Atlantic essay "Why Are All the Cartoon Mothers Dead," which analyzed why kids' animated films so often kill off the mother figures at the very beginning of the movie, was chosen for the textbook Rereading America: Cultural Contexts for Critical Thinking and Writing. In a segment titled "Kids' Films And Stories Share A Dark Theme: Dead Mothers," NPR interviewed her about this phenomenon. Her New York Times piece on the healing powers of New Yorkistan, a humorous New Yorker map drawn by Maira Kalman and Rick Meyerowitz after September 11, was adapted for the book You Are Here: NYC: Mapping the Soul of the City. Her essay "The Exemplary Narcissism of Snoopy," which was called "stunningly good" and held up as prose to emulate on Bryan Garner's LawProse blog in a post titled "Learning to write by sedulous aping," was subsequently anthologized in The Peanuts Papers. "It's Complicated," on Boxer's fraught relationship with Freud, is the lead essay in On The Couch: Writer's Analyze Sigmund Freud. The Wall Street Journal called the anthology "touching ... powerful ... lovely."

=== Comics ===
At age eleven, Boxer published her first drawing in The Englewood Herald in Colorado. Beginning in the 1990s, she drew occasional spot drawings for the Op-Ed page and the Week in Review of The New York Times.

Boxer's first graphic novel, In The Floyd Archives: A Psycho-Bestiary (Pantheon, 2001), a comic with footnotes, which The New York Times Book Review described as "a smart, droll, original series of interconnected cartoons" based on Sigmund Freud's case histories (the Rat Man, the Wolf Man, Little Hans, and Dora), stars a cast of neurotic animals in therapy with a bird analyst named Floyd. In a review, Jenny Lyn Bader called this comic "part academe and part whimsy, a wildly clever collection." In a piece titled "Floydian Funnies," The Comics Journal noted that "Boxer belongs to the line of erudite, intellectual cartooning exemplified by Jules Feiffer, David Levine and Edward Gorey."

Mother May I?: A Post-Floydian Folly (IP Books), Boxer's second psychoanalytic comic, based on the life and work of Melanie Klein and Donald Winnicott, came out in 2019. At the same time, a new edition of In the Floyd Archives was published. Kirkus Reviews called In the Floyd Archives "an endlessly amusing parody" with "a hysterically off-kilter tone," And it described called Mother May I? as "a kooky and witty illustrated tale that’s full of intelligence and educational value." Reviewing both comics together, The Journal of the American Psychoanalytic Association wrote that Boxer "does nothing short of embodying – in fact, giving animal bodies to – a pantheon of iconic psychoanalytic characters and the love-hate relationships they bring to life." Tablet magazine noted that her "psychoanalytic comix are ingeniously playful reminders of how much we carry around, no matter how far we think we’ve moved on from the Freudian fantasyland."

Boxer has also drawn two Shakespearean Tragic-Comics. In the first, Hamlet: Prince of Pigs, Hamlet is played by a little piglet, Hamlet's uncle Claudius, the murderer, whom Shakespeare calls "the bloat king," is played by a big fat hog, and Hamlet's mother, Gertrude, is played by a pig with lipstick. An excerpt from that comic ran in The New York Review of Books under the headline "How Hamlet Became My Prince of Pigs," In Boxer's second Tragic-Comic, Anchovius Caesar: The Decomposition of a Romaine Salad, Caesar is played by an anchovy, Mark Antony is a mock anchovy (a sprat), the Romans are leaves of romaine lettuce, and the countrymen are crouton-men. In an interview for Print magazine's blog, Steve Heller described Boxer's Tragic-Comics as "exposing the great William Shakespeare to the slings and arrows of outrageous fortune."
