= College of Professional Pilots of Canada =

Canadian professional organization

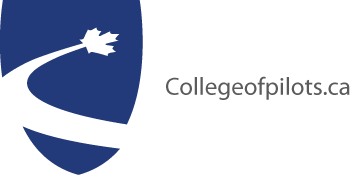
College logo

The College of Pilots Canada is a professional organization consisting of pilots from within the industry. It is made up of members holding a Commercial Pilot License (CPL) or higher, as well as pilots currently enrolled in flight training working towards a CPL.

They believe that the occupation of a Pilot should be a certified profession much like many other professions are, and will aid in working towards a safe and more self regulated profession in conjunction with Transport Canada.

They aim to be recognized as the worldwide "gold standard" for the self-governing model for maintaining pilots credentials. The group was established not only with a common goal in mind but also because of an accident that occurred in Winnipeg, Manitoba on June 11, 2002. The accident occurred when a light twin engine aircraft piloted by Mr. Tayfel and operated by Keystone Air Service crashed, killing one of the six passengers. The aircraft, on a charter from a remote fishing lodge, performed a go-around in Winnipeg International Airport and ran out of fuel crashing into a busy intersection in the Winnipeg area.

The defence argued that the flight operator, Keystone Air, should take the blame because Tayfel's bosses pressured him to go ahead with the flight as scheduled. During cross-examination, though, Tayfel admitted he did not push the issue of the auto-pilot system any further with the chief pilot. Aviation experts testified during the trial that if the aircraft had been equipped with a working auto pilot, the pilot would have most likely been able to land on the first attempt and not crashed.

The accident subsequently led to the criminal conviction of the pilot in 2007 setting a legal precedent for all pilots in Canada.

== About ==
The College is not a union, nor does it aim to be. A union protects individuals where the College is to care for the profession. The goal is to cultivate pilots professional excellence, and to teach and maintain safe and accepted practices in both pilots working for a living, and pilots in training.

The principal functions of the College would be to certify pilots and accredit flight schools curriculums. They would provide ongoing support, guidance, and education to ensure pilots achieve and maintain the high levels of expertise the public has come to expect.

== History ==
The College of Professional Pilots of Canada began in 2008 when group of pilots from the industry united after a 2007 conviction of a fellow pilot who crashed an aircraft after running out of fuel, killing one passenger. They met not only with this incident in mind but also to discuss the current state of the industry and its future, with focus on having a pilot be a professional.

It was agreed that the best natural progression of the profession should be to have certification of a professional pilots licenses and credentials to a self-governing model. This, like most other professional organizations, would mean that pilots would be governing and licensing themselves.

This led to the registration of a not-for-profit corporation in early 2009 and shortly after its first official meeting. At this meeting the College's first board of directors and executive members were appointed and the organization began.

On August 8, 2012, the College of Professional Pilots of Canada officially unveiled their website as well as a press release to the public with the College's intentions.

The College plans to hold its first true meeting including its members in the Fall of 2013 where the current board will resign, and its nationally elected board will be voted in by its growing membership.

== Mission ==
The mission of the College of Professional Pilots of Canada is rooted in the interest of public safety with collaboration with all stakeholders, the College will oversee, maintain and promote the calibre of pilots in Canada.

With this mission they would be able to uphold safe and accepted practices to make aviation safer for the flying public. As the President of the CPPC mentioned in an interview with AVweb in March 2013; "that if successful, the College would set and enforce standards for commercial pilots and provide needed input into regulations and laws that govern aviation in the same way that the governing bodies of other professions operate"

== Membership ==
Membership is currently open to all Canadian Commercial and Airline Transport rated fixed wing and rotary wing pilots as well as pilots enrolled in commercial flight training. The current cost of membership is $60 per year for Commercial and Airline Transport rated pilots, and $20 per year for pilots training towards their commercial licence. As of September 30, 2013 the College of Pilots had 1264 members and counting.

== In the media ==
- "Professional Recognition Sought For Pilots" - AVweb March 2013
- "The College of Pilots Can Elevate the Flying Profession" - ACPA journal Spring 2012.
- "Professional Transition" - Skies Magazine Jan 2013
