= Cross-linguistic onomatopoeias =

Because of the nature of onomatopoeia, there are many words which show a similar pronunciation in the languages of the world. The following is a list of some conventional examples:

== Human sounds ==
=== Consuming food or drink ===
Language	Biting	Eating food	Drinking	Swallowing	Brushing teeth
Afrikaans	hap	gomf, nom, hom-nom-nom	gloeg gloeg gloeg		
Albanian	ham, kërr, krrëk	ham-ham, njam-njam	llup, gllup		välmos-fësh, fër-fër
Arabic	hum-hum	humm	شرب (sharib)		
Azerbaijani		nəm nəm	qurt qurt		fıç fıç
Basque	kosk, hozk	mauka mauka	zurrut	klik	
Batak		nyaum nyaum		guk	
Bengali		গব গব (gob gob), গবা গব (goba gob), সপা সপ (sopa sop)	ঢক ঢক (dhak dhak), ঢগ ঢগ (dhaug dhaug), ঘট ঘট (ghat ghat), গট গট (gat gat), কল-কল (kol-kol)	ঢোঁক গেলা (dhnok gela)	
Bulgarian	хрус (hrus), мляс (mlias)	ам ам (am am)	гльок гльок (glyok glyok)	гъл (gull)	
Catalan	nyac	nyam nyam	glup	glu glu	
Chinese, Cantonese		嗦嗦 (sok4 sok2 for crunchy foods, zep1 zep1 in general)		嗗 (gut2, gut4, gut6)	
Chinese, Mandarin			咕咚 咕咚 (gū-dōng gū-dōng), 咕嚕咕嚕 (gū-lū gū-lū)		唰 (shua)
Croatian	gric	njam njam	glp glp, glu glu	gut	
Czech	chřup [xr̝up], chroup [xroup]	ham, ňam ňam [ɲam], mňam mňam [mɲam]	glo glo		
Danish	haps [hɑb̥s]	nam nam, mam mam	slurk, glub	glub, gulp	
Dutch	hap	jam jam	slurp, klok klok klok	slik	
English	chomp	yum yum, nom nom	slurp, glug	gulp	
Estonian	amps	näm näm, nämm nämm	kull kull	lonks	
Filipino		nam nam		lunók	tsuka tsuka
Finnish	grunts, hams, hauks, rousk	mums-mums, mussun-mussun, mässyn-mässyn, mässyti-mässyti, nam nam, rousk-rousk-rousk	gluk gluk gluk, gulps, klunks-klunks, hörps, ryyps, ryyst	klup	
French	miam, crounche	miam miam	glouglouglou	gloups	
German	mampf	mampf mampf, hamm hamm, mjam	schlürf, gluck	schluck	
Gujarati			gudgud		
Hebrew		אָממ אָממ (amm amm)		שלוּק (shluk)	צחצוח (tsikhtsúakh), שקשוק (shikshúk, refers to "shaking teeth")
Hindi		गप गप (gap gap)	गट गट (gaṭ gaṭ)		
Hungarian	hamm	nyam-nyam, csám-csám	glu-glu, glugy-glugy		sika-sika
Icelandic	kjams	nammi namm	glúgg glúgg		
Indonesian	krauk	nyam nyam	glek glek, gluk gluk	glek	sruk sruk
Italian	gnam	gnam gnam	glu glu	glu glu	
Japanese	ムシャムシャ (musha-musha)	モグモグ (mogu mogu), パクパク (paku paku)	ゴクゴク (goku goku)	ごくっ (goku)	シャカシャカ (shaka shaka)
Kazakh			лық-лық (lyq-lyq), сылқ-сылқ (sylq-sylq)	сылқ (sylq)	
Korean	와작와작 (wajak-wajak)	냠냠 (nyam nyam), 얌얌 (yam yam), 쩝쩝 (jjeop jjeop)	꿀꺽 꿀꺽 (kkul kkeok kkul kkeok)	꿀꺽 (kkul kkeok)	치카치카 (chika chika)
Kyrgyz		шам-шум (sham-shum)			
Latvian	am	ņam ņam	gul gul		
Lithuanian		niam niam	kliuk kliuk		
Malay	ngap ngap	nyam nyam nyam	glup glup, teguk		
Malayalam		ഞംഞം (njam-njam), കറുമുറു (karu-muru, hard/crunchy)		ഗ്ലപ് ഗ്ലപ് (glap-glap)	
Marathi	कुर्रुम-कुर्रुम (krum-krum)	मम् मम् (mam mam)	गट-गट (gaT gaT)	गटक (gatak)	
Nepali	लापलुप [ˈlaplup], कर्याम-कुरुम [kʌɾjam kuɾum]	क्प्प [kwapːʌ])	घट-घट [ˈɡʱʌʈɡʱʌʈ], कल-कल [kʌlkʌl]		
Norwegian		nam nam	glugg glugg		
Persian			qolop-qolop		
Polish	chap, am, chrup (crunch)	mniam mniam, chrup chrup (if hard), mlask	gul gul	gul gul	szuru szuru, szuru buru
Portuguese	nhac, nhoc	nham nham	glup glup	glup	
Romanian	hap, haț	miam miam, niam niam, pleasc-pleasc	gâl-gâl	gogâlț	
Russian	хрум (khrum)	ам (am, quick), ням-ням (njam-njam)	бульк бульк (bulk-bulk)		
Serbian	гриц (gric) [grits]	њам-њам (njam-njam)			
Slovak	chrum	mňam, ham	glo, glo-glo		
Slovene	gric, hrsk	njam njam	glu, glu-glu		
Spanish	ñam	ñam ñam	glu glu glu, glup	glup	
Swedish	nam-nam	nam nam	glugg glugg, klunk klunk	gulp	
Tamil		கருக்கு முறுக்கு (karukk murukk, mainly used to indicate crunching)			
Thai	งั่บ (ngap), ง่ำ (ngam)	ง่ำ ง่ำ (ngam ngam)	อึ้ก (uek), เอื้อก (ueak)	อึก อึก (uek uek)	
Turkish	hart, hurt	ham hum, nam nam	hüüp, lıkır lıkır	gulp	fıtı fıtı
Ukrainian	ам (am), ням (niam), хрум (khrum, if crunchy), кусь (kus)	ням-ням (niam-niam), хрусь-хрусь (khrus-khrus, if crunchy), хлам-хлам (khlam-khlam, if hastily), хряп-хряп (khriap-khriap, if hastily)	бульк-бульк (bulk-bulk), глип-глип (glyp-glyp), ґлаґ-ґлаґ (glug-glug)	ґольґ (golg)	шурх-шурх (shurkh-shurkh), шорх-шорх (shorkh-shorkh)
Vietnamese	ngoạm	măm măm, nhăm nhăm, nhồm nhoàm, chàm chạp	ực ực, ừng ực		

=== Bodily functions and involuntary sounds ===
Language	Heart beating	Belching	Coughing	Flatulence	Sneezing	Snoring	Yawning
Afrikaans	doef doef	Braak	Proes, Hoes, Roggel	Poep, Knor	Ha-tiesjoe	Snork	Gaap
Albanian	pam-pam, bam-bam	grrom	këm-këm, gam-gam	përrpërr	tësh, açu, eçu	gërr, grro	
Arabic	tum tum, رطم رطم (raṭama-raṭama)			draat, fassi, or tooz	hatchu		
Armenian	dchk-dchk, lck-lck			thurr, tuss			haptchi
Australian	padam padam						
Azerbaijani	gup-gup		öhö-öhö	zart, zırt		xor	
Basque	bun-bun-bun, danba-danba, pal-pal, pil-pil, pilpil-pulpul, pilpiri-palpara, pir-pir, pupa, sast-sast, tak, taktak, taka-taka, tanka, tanp-tanp, tanpa-tanpa, tapa-tapa, taup-taup, taupa-taupa, tik-tik, tis-tas, trapata, tunpa, punpa (strongly), panp-panp (nervously)	broust, korrok, kurrunk, zarra	aju-aju, atxu-atxu, eiu, eju, keju-keju, kuj-kuj, tuju-tuju, ugh	par, parra, parrat, pirri, pirrit, pirrit-parrat, porrot, prrrrrrut, puiiiit, purrut, tarrat, tirri eta tarra, tirri-tarra, tirrit tarrat, turrut	atija, atije, atrija, atxi, atxis, atxix, atxufa, hatifa, hatxiu	gurrunga, korroka, korronga, korronka, korrox, korroxka, kurrun, kurrunka, pzzz, rru-rru, ru-ru-ru, zirri-zorro, zorro-zorro, zurru, zurrun, zurruzta, zzzzz	uaaa
Batak	bar-bar-bar	org		put	atcim	korrrr	
Bengali	দুরদুর (durdur), দুরুদুরু (duruduru), লাব ডুব (lāb dub), dhuk-puk				হাঁচি (hąci), hąccho	bhnosh bhnosh, ঘ ঘ (gho gho)	hai
Bulgarian	туп-туп (tup tup)	уриг (urig)		пръц (prats)	апчих (apchih), ких (kih)	хърр (hurr)	
Catalan	tu-tum tu-tum, pu-pum pu-pum	rot	cof, cof	prut	atxim, atxem	rrrr, rau-rau	uà, uaah
Cebuano							hahay
Chinese, Cantonese	卜卜 (buk4 buk4)	oek4 or oet4 [œʔ²¹]	kem4 (kem2)	but4, but4 but4	乞嗤 (hat1 ci1)	got4 syu4, got4 got2 seng1, goet4 goet2 seng1	
Chinese, Mandarin	怦怦 (pēng pēng) (Note: "怦怦" in Han Dian online dictionary)				阿嚏 (ā tì) (Note: "阿嚏" in Han Dian online dictionary)	呼噜 (hū lu) (Note: "呼噜" in Han Dian online dictionary)	
Croatian	tup tup, bum bum		kah	prd	apćih, apćiha	zzz	zijev
Czech	buch buch	krk		prd	hepčí ([ˈɦɛpt͡ʃiː])	chrrr	zív
Danish	dunk dunk, bank bank	bøvs ([bœwˀs]), (Note: bøvs) ræb ([ʁεˀb]) (Note: ræb)		prut, fis	atju, hatju	snork	gab
Dutch	boenk boenk, boem boem, klop, klop	burp	uche, uche	prot	hatsjoe, hatsjie	snurk, zzz	gaap
English	thump thump, lub dub, ba-bump	burp	cough cough	fart, toot	achoo	zzz, honk-shoo	yawn, ho-hum
Estonian	tuks tuks	krooks	köh köh	puuks	atsihh, atsih, aptsihh, aptsih	norr	
Filipino	dub dub dub dub, tibók tibók	ebb		purorót, utót	hatsíng, bahíng	kok-sss	hikab
Finnish	tu-tum, pu-pum, pumputi-pumputi	baarp, röyh	köh köh	brööt, prut, prööt	atshii, atshiu, atsiuh, ätshii, ätshiu, ätsiuh	krooh pyyh, krrrh-hjuhjuhju	hhauks, huaah
French	boum boum	beurp	koff koff, teu-heu	prout	atchoum, atchi, atcha	ron pchi, (rrr) zzz	ouaaah
German	ba-dumm, bumm bumm, poch poch	rülps	hust	pups	hatschi, hatschu	chrr-pfüüh, schnarch, zzz, chhhh, ratze-püh	gähn
Greek	ντουκ ντουκ (duk-duk)		γκουχ γκουχ (gookh gookh)		αψ(ι)ου (aps(i)u)		
Hebrew	בּוּם־בּוּם (bum-búm)	גְּרֶפְּס (greps)		פּוּק (pook), פלוץ (flotz)	אַפְּצִ'י apchi (Note: "אַפְּצִ'י" in Morfix online dictionary)	חְררר (xrrr)	
Hindi	धक धक (dhak dhak)				आछी (achhee)		हा (hā)
Hungarian	ta-tamm	böff	köh-köh	pú	hapci	hrr pityipű	
Icelandic	dúnk dúnk				atsjú		
Indonesian	dag-dig-dug, deg-deg	erk	uhuk-uhuk	pret, prett, tuut	hacciihh	grookkk	hoam
Italian	tu tump	rutt		prot	etciú	ronf, zzz	
Japanese	ドキドキ (doki doki, nervous excitement, suspense, thrill)	ゲップ (geppu)	ゲホゲホ (geho-geho), ゴホン (gohon)	ブ (bu), プ (pu)	ハクション (hakushon)	ぐうぐう (gu-gu)	フワアーア (fuwaāa
Kannada	dub bub, dava dava						
Kazakh	дүрс-дүрс (du'rs-du'rs)			парт (part), парт-пұрт (part-purt)	әпшу (apshu)	қорр (qorr), қорр-қорр (qorr-qorr)	
Korean	두근두근 (dugeun dugeun)	꺼억 (kkeo-eok)	콜록 (kollok)	뿡 (ppung)	에취 (echwi)	드르렁 (deureureong)	하암 (haam)
Latin		ruct		prox			
Latvian	tuk-tuk				ačī, apčī		žāv
Lithuanian	tuk tuk			pirst	apčiū, apči		
Macedonian	туп туп (tup tup)				апчиха (apchiha)		
Malay	dup dap dup dap	ə~kk, bəkk		pro~t, pret, poot	achom, achum	krrohh krrohh, dengkur	haaa, nguap
Marathi	धड धड (dhad dhad), धक-धक (dhak dhak)			ढुस्स (dhuss), ढुम (dhum)	आच्छीं (acchin), आच्छू (acchoo)	घोर (ghor), घुर्र (ghurr)	
Navajo	tsʼidog						
Nepali	ढुक-ढुक [ɖʱukɖʱuk]	ढ्याउ [ɖʱjau̯]	ख्याक-ख्याक [kʰjakkʰjak]	ह्वास्स [ɦwasːʌ]	हाच्छ्यु [ˈɦat͡st͡sʰju]	घुर-घुर [ɡʱurɡʱur]	हाई [ɦai̯]
Norwegian	dunk dunk				aatsjoo		
Persian	tāp-o-tūp, tāp-tāp	ārūġ		pup	achu	xor-o-pof, xor-nāse	
Polish	bum bum, bu-bum, łup-łup (bumping), puk-puk	bek	kche-kche, khe-khe, kchy-kchy, khy-khy	pierd, prrr, pruk, prut, pryt	a-psik, psik	chrrr, chrrr-pśśś	aaa, ziew
Portuguese	tun-tum	burp		pum	atchim, atchô	zzz	uah
Romanian		râg (a râgâi means to burp)		pârț	hapciu	sfor	
Russian	тук-тук (tuk-tuk)		кхе-кхе (kkhe-kkhe)	пук (puk)	апчхи (apchkhi)	хр-р-р (khrrr)	
Serbian	туп-туп (tup-tup)			трт (trt)	апћиха (apćiha)		
Sinhalese					හචිස් (hacis)		
Slovak		grg			hapčí		
Slovene					ačih, ačiha		
Spanish	bum bum bum, tucutún tucutún		tjum, tjum	prt	achu, achís, achú	szzz	
Swedish	du-dunk, du-dunk	rap		prutt	atjoo	snark	gäsp
Tamil	lappu-tappu			karukk murukk	a-choo		
Telugu	lab-dab			para para	Haatch		
Thai	ตุ้บ ตุ้บ (tup tup), ตึ้ก ตั้ก (tuek tak)	เอิ่ก (oek)	แค่ก แค่ก (khaek khaek)	ปู้ด (puut), ป้าด (pät)	ฮัดเช่ย (hatchoei), ฮัดชิ่ว (hatchiw)	ครอก ฟี้ (khrok fi), ครอก ครอก (khrok khrok)	หาว (hao)
Turkish	güm güm, küt küt, güp güp	gark	öhö öhö	zart, zort, pırt	hapşu	hor	
Urdu	dhakdhak						
Vietnamese	thình thịch, bình bịch	ợ	ho	phẹt, bủm, địt	hắt xì, ắt xì	khò, khò khò	oáp, ngáp

=== Cries of distress ===
Language	Baby crying	Scream	Shriek
Afrikaans	wê	Yôôôôô	Eish
Albanian	ua-ua, uëë	au, oh, ai	
Arabic	وع وع (wa'-wa')	أي (ai)	
Azerbaijani	ingə	uf, of, ox	
Basque		ai, aiei, epa	
Batak	nguek nguek	alale	ei
Belarusian		ай (aj)	
Bengali	ওয়া ওয়া (oaa oaa), ভ্যাঁ ভ্যাঁ (bhaen̐ bhaen̐), ব্য ব্যঁ (bae baen̐), ওয়্যা ওয়্যা (oae oae), অ্যাহ-হে (aeh-he)		
Bulgarian	уаа уаа (uaa uaa)	ай (aj), ау (au), ох (oh), ой (oj)	
Catalan	enguè, engüè, engú	ai, au, ui, uix, oi	hiii, crii
Chinese, Cantonese	哇哇 (waa1 waa1)	哎呀 (aai1 jaa3)	
Chinese, Mandarin	哇哇 (wā wā) (Note: "哇哇" in Han Dian online dictionary)	啊 (ā), 噢 (ō), 哎呀 (āiyā), 哎哟 (āiyō)	
Croatian		jao, joj, uaijh, au, auč	
Czech	bé bé [bɛːbɛː]	au, jau	
Danish	vræl [ˈvʁεːˀl] (Note: vræl)	av	
Dutch		au, auw	iek
English	wah-wah (Note: "wah-wah" from the Oxford English Dictionary)	ah, arghh ow, ouch, yeow, yow, agh, eek, yikes, oof	gah, eek, yikes
Estonian	ää-ää	ai, oi	
Filipino	uwá	aráy, ay, arúy	
Finnish	byääh, vä-hää, yää	ai, aih, au, auh, auts	iik, kääk, ääks
French	ouin ouin	aïe, ouille, ayoye (Quebec), ouch (Quebec), aw (Quebec), ouaille (Belgium)	hii
Galician		ai	
German	wäh-wäh	au, aua, ah, autsch	uwah, waah, ieh
Greek	ουά-ουά (ouá-ouá) [uaua]	ωχ (òkh)	
Haitian Creole		ay	
Hebrew		אָח (àx), (Note: "Ouch" in Morfix online dictionary) אָי (ài), אױ ײ (oy vey)	
Hindi		आहा (àhhà), वाह-वाह (hhàvh-hhàvh)	
Hungarian	oá oá	aú, á, jaj	
Icelandic		ái, ói, æi	
Indonesian	owe-owe	aduh, ai, aih, awww	wao, huwah
Irish		aigh	
Italian	uè-uè	ahi, ahia, ohi	aah, iih
Japanese	オギャー (ogyaa)	ギャー (gyā)	きゃあ (kyaa)
Kazakh	іңгә-іңгә (in'ga-in'ga)		
Korean	응애-응애 (eung'ae-eung'ae)	아 (a), 아야 (aya), 꺄 (kkya)	으악 (eu-ak)
Kyrgyz	ыңаа-ыңаа (yngaa-yngaa)		
Latvian		vai, au, ā	ai
Lithuanian		ai, oi	
Macedonian		уф (uf)	
Malay	uwek-uwek, wek-wek	aduh, adoi, adoiyai, opocot, alamak, omakkau, aaah, haish	iish, eee, iyek
Marathi	वँ वँ (waan waan)	आ आ (aa aa), आऽई (aaee)	आऽई (aaee), ईऽ (ee)
Navajo		ayá	
Nepali		आ [aː], ऐया [ʌi̯jaː]	
Norwegian		au	
Pashtu		ooauy, why	
Persian	vang-vang	آخ (āx), وای (vāy)	آی (āy)
Polish	łeee	ała (stressed on the last syllable), ał, auuu, auć, aj, ła	aaa
Portuguese	buá buá	ah, au, ui	ai
Romanian	oa-oa, ue-ue	au, ai, aa, ah	
Russian	уа-уа (ua-ua)	ой (oj), ай (aj), ох (okh)	уи-и-и (wi-i-i, pig)
Serbian	кме-кме (kme-kme)	jao, joj, uaijh, au, auč, jao, ауу	
Slovak		au	
Slovenian		auč	
Spanish	buá buá, ro ro	au, ay	
Sinhalese	oha oha		
Swedish	uää-uää	aj, oj	ii
Thai	อุแว้ อุแว้ (uwae uwae), แง้ แง้ (ngae ngae)	อ๊าก (ak), ว๊าก (wak), โอ๊ย (oi), อ๊าย (ai)	อู๊ย (ui), โอ๊ย (oi), อ๊าย (ai)
Turkish	ıngaa	ah, ahh, of, öf, üf	ciyak
Ukrainian		ай (aj), йой (joj), ой (oj)	
Urdu		آہ (-ààh), ooauy	
Uropi		aw	
Vietnamese	oa oa, oe oe	a, á, ối, oái	híc
Yiddish		אוי (oy)	

=== Interrupted speech ===
Language	Hushing	Pausing or thinking	Stuttering
Afrikaans	sjoes, Sjuut	Erm	Hakkel
Albanian	shh, shët	ëëë, ëmm	gaga, gëgë
Arabic	suh, hoss	يعني (y'ani)	tahtaha
Armenian	լուռ (loor), սուս (soos)	ըը (uhh), ըհը (uhu)	թօթօ (to-to)
Basque	ixo	ba...	ele-mele
Batak			a-ak
Bengali			থৎমৎ (thôtomôto)
Bulgarian	шът (shut, sh't)	ъъъ (aaa)	
Catalan	xxt, xst, pst, xit, xist	ai, au, ui, uix	
Chinese, Cantonese	殊 (syu4)	嗯 (m6, m3)	甩甩咳咳 (lak1 lak1 kak1 kak1)
Chinese, Mandarin	噓 (xū) (Note: "嘘" in Han Dian online dictionary)	嗯 (èn)	
Croatian	ššš, pssst		
Czech	pš [pʃ]	é [e:] or [ʔ], hmmm, mmm	bla bla
Danish	ssh, sshy, schyy all pronounced [ʃː(ʷ)], tys [tˢys], hys [hys]	øh	
Dutch	ssst	eh	hakkel, stotter
English	hush, shh, shush	uh, um, er, erm, hmmm, mmm	
Estonian	kuss, tšš	ee	
Filipino	tsut		sasasasa
Finnish	shh, hys	öö, hmm	
French	chut	heu, euh	
German	pst, pscht, husch, schusch	äh, ähm	Hawa, hawa, babababa
Greek	σσσ (ssss), σσουτ (ssut), σιωπή (sjopí, “silence”)	μα (ma), ε (eh)	
Hebrew	שְשש (shh)	אהמ (ehm) אהה (Ehhh)	גִּמְגּוּם (gimgum)
Hindi	श्श्श्श्, (shhhh)	ह्म्म्म्, (hmmm)	हहहह, (hhhh)
Hungarian	pissz, psszt	hm, hmm, őő	
Icelandic	uss, suss		
Indonesian	ssst	hmmm	a ak
Italian	shh	mmm, ehm	
Japanese	シー (shh)	うーん (ūn), エート (ēto)	
Korean	쉿 (swit)	어 (eo), 음 (eum), 그 (keu)	어쩌고저쩌고 (eojjeogojeojjeogo), 이러쿵저러쿵 (ireokungjeoreokung)
Latvian	kuš, ššš	mmm, hmm	
Lithuanian	ša, ššš		
Malay	shhht	aaa, amm	ha ha
Marathi	शूऽऽ (ssshhhoo), चुप (chup)	हम्ऽ (hmm)	तत पप (tata papa)
Norwegian	hysj	ø, øh	
Persian	hīs	hmm	tete-pete
Polish	ćśśś, sza, szszsz	eee, emmm, hmmm, yyy	y-yh
Portuguese	chi, chit, si, xiu, psiu	ããã, ééé, âââ, hmm	
Romanian	sst, șșt, șșș	ăăă	bâl-bâl
Russian	тс-с (ts-s), ш-ш (sh-sh), цыц (tsyts)	хм (hm), эм (em)	ик (ik)
Serbian	пссст (pssst), шшш (shhh)		
Sinhalese			බැක් බැක් (bäk bäk)
Slovak	čššš, pssst	hmmm	bla bla bla
Slovene	pšt, pst	hm, em	
Spanish	chitón, cht	mmm	
Swedish	schh	öh	
Tamil	oosshhh		
Thai	จุ๊จุ๊ (chu chu), ชู่ (chuu)	เอ่อ (oe), อืม (uem)	ตะ ตะ ตะ (ta ta ta)
Turkish	şişt, şişş	ııı, ee, hmm	kekelemek
Ukrainian	цить (tsyt)		гик (hyk)
Uropi	cit, ccc		
Vietnamese	suỵt, xuýt	hmm, hừmm	lắp bắp

=== Expressions of positive emotions ===
Language	Laughter	Kiss
Afrikaans	ha ha	mwa
Albanian	ha ha, hu hu, he he	puç, mpuç
Arabic	hà hà	mwa
Armenian	քա քա (ka ka), չա չա (cha cha)	
Asturian	ḥa ḥa, ḥe ḥe	
Basque	kar kar	pa
Batak	kakak	ummah
Bengali	হাঃ হাঃ (hah hah), হীহী (hee hee), হো হো (ho ho)	চুম্ম (chummo), চুম্মা (chumma), সুম্মা (summa), উম্মা (umma), উম্ম্বা (ummwa)
Bosnian	ha ha, he he, hi hi	cmok, pusa
Bulgarian	хаха (haha), хехехе (hehe), хихи (hihi)	цун (tsun), мляс (mlyas)
Catalan	haha, hehe, hihi, hoho, clac clac, clec clec	muà, muac, txuic, xuic
Chinese, Cantonese	哈哈 (haa1 haa1)	
Chinese, Mandarin	哈哈 (hā hā), (Note: "哈哈" in Han Dian online dictionary) 呵呵 (hē hē), (Note: "呵呵" in Han Dian online dictionary) 嘻嘻 (xī xī), (Note: "嘻嘻" in Han Dian online dictionary) 嘿嘿 (hēi hēi)	啵 (boh, this word is a modern creation)
Croatian	ha ha, he he, hi hi	cmok
Czech	ha ha, cha cha [xa xa], chi chi [xi xi]	
Danish	ha ha, hi hi, hæ hæ, ho ho, ti hi	møs
Dutch	haha, hihi	smak, mwah
English	haha, heh-heh, hoho, (tee)heehee	mwah, smooch, smack
Estonian	haha, hahhah, hehe, hehheh, hihi	mopsti
Filipino	haha, hehe, hihi	tsup, mwah
Finnish	haha, hahhah, hehe, hehheh, hihi (girly), höhö (unintelligent), hä-hää, kieh-kieh (cunning)	moiskis, muisk
French	haha, héhé, hihi, hoho	mouah, smack
German	haha, hihi	muah, schmatz
Greek	χαχα (haha), χεχε (hehe)	μα (ma), ματς (mats), μουτς (mouts)
Hebrew	חָה־חָה (xà xà) (Note: "חָה חָה חָה" in Morfix online dictionary)	מוּאָה (mwa)
Hindi	हाहा (haha), खीखी (khikhi)	उम्ऽमा (umma)
Hungarian	haha, hehe, hihi, höhö	cupp
Icelandic	haha, hehe, híhí (tittering or laughter)	
Indonesian	haha, hehe, wakaka, wkwkwk, wakkss	muahhh, cupp
Italian	ah ah, eh eh, ih ih, uh uh	muah
Japanese	あはは (ahaha), フフ (fu fu)	チュー (chū)
Kazakh	қарқ-қарқ (qarq-qarq)	шөп (sho'p)
Korean	하하 (haha), 케케 (keke)	쪽 (jjok)
Latvian	ha ha	buč
Lithuanian	cha cha	pakšt
Macedonian		цмок (tsmoc)
Malay	kahkah, haha, kiki, bahahah	muah
Malayalam	ഹഹഹ (hahaha), ഹിഹിഹി (hihihi)	ഉമ്മ (umma)
Marathi	हा हा (ha ha), खो खो (kho kho) (loud laughter)	उम्ऽमा (umma)
Navajo		ts'oos, k'oos
Nepali	हाहा (haha, ahaha) [ɦaɦa],	म्म्वाँ [mːwã]
Norwegian	ha-ha, he-he, hi-hi, ho-ho	smask
Persian	hā-hā, he-he, qāh-qāh	m, mp, māč-o-mūč
Polish	haha, hihi, hehe, hoho, hyhy	cmok
Portuguese	haha, kaka, huehua	splish splash, smac, chuac
Romanian	ha-ha, hi-hi	smac, ţoc, mua
Russian	хаха (haha), хихи (hihi), хехе (hèhè)	чмок (chmok)
Serbian	хаха (haha), хихи (hihi), хехе (hehe)	цмок (tsmok)
Sinhalese		උම්ම (umma)
Slovak	ha ha, cha cha, hi hi	cmuk
Slovene	haha, hihi, hehe, hoho, huhu	cmok
Somali	k(h)a k(h)a	
Spanish	jaja, jeje, jiji, jojo, juju	mua, muac, chuik (South America)
Swedish	haha, hehe, hoho, hihi, höhö, håhå	smack
Tamil	hihi	umma
Telugu	haha	umma
Thai	ฮ่า ๆ ๆ (hahaha)	จุ๊บ (chup), จ๊วบ (chuap)
Turkish	haha, hehe, hihi (girly), kikir (girly, sarcastic), hoho (sarcastic)	muck [mudʒ(u)k]
Ukrainian	ги ги (hihi), ги-ги-ги, га-га (haha), ге-ге (hehe), гі-гі (hihi), кха (kkha), і-хи-хи-х (i khi khi kh, haha, іх (ikh), khe khe, khi, kha:	цьом (tsiom)
Vietnamese	ha ha, hi hi, hô hô, keke, ka ka, hehe, hi hô, hêlo duke huê	chụt

== Animal sounds ==
=== Bird sounds ===
==== Domestic birds ====
Language	Chicken clucking	Rooster crowing	Turkey calling	Goose calling	Duck calling
Afrikaans	kloek kloek	koekeloekoe	koel-koel	Gaggel, blaas	kwaak
Albanian		kikiriki	glluglluk	gak-gak	mak-mak
Arabic	قرقر (qur qur), بق بق بيق (baq baq baiq)	kuku-kookoo, kuku-reekoo, esku kookoo, صقاع (siqā`)		كواك كواك (kwāk kwāk)	وق وق (waq-waq), بطبطة (batbata) (Note: الباحث العربي: قاموس عربي عربي)
Armenian	ճիտ ճիտ ճիտ (jeed jeed jeed)	tsoo-ghoo-roo-ghoo, coo-coo-ree-coo			
Basque	kakara-kakara	kukurruku		karra-karra	par-par
Batak	kotek-kotek				kuak-kuak
Bengali	খক খক (khok khok), কক কক (kok kok)	কক্কড়ো (kokkodo), কক্কড়ক (kokkodok), কুক্কুরুক্কু (kukkurukku), খুক্কুরুক্কু (khukkurukku)			pnak pnak
Bulgarian	ко-ко-ко (ko-ko-ko)	кукуригу (cucurigu)		квак-квак (kvak kvak)	па-па (paa paa)
Catalan	cloc, cloc-cloc	quiquiriquic, cocorococ	glo-glo-gloc, glu-glu	coac-coac, guac-guac, qüec-qüec	coac-coac, mec-mec, nyec, qüec-qüec
Chinese, Cantonese	咯咯 (gok4 gok1)	咯咯咯咯 (gok4 gok1 gok3 gok6)			呱呱 (gwek4 gwek2)
Chinese, Mandarin	咯咯 (gē gē)	咕咕咕 (gū gū gū)			嘎嘎 (gā gā), (Note: "嘎嘎" in Han Dian online dictionary) 呱呱 (guā guā) (Note: "呱呱" in Han Dian online dictionary)
Croatian	kokoda, kokodak	kukuriku	glu-glu-glu	ga ga	kva kva
Czech	kokodák	kykirikí	hudry hudry	ga ga	káč káč
Danish	kuk kuk, gok gok	kykkeliky			rap rap
Dutch	tok tok tok	kukeleku		gak gak	kwak kwak, kwaak kwaak
English	cluck cluck, bawk bawk, bok bok bok, bok bok b'gawk, buk erk	cock a doodle doo	gobble gobble	honk honk	quack
Estonian	kaa-kaa, kaak-kaak	kikerikii, kukeleegu		kaak kaak	prääk prääk, prääks prääks
Filipino	po-kok	tik-tilá-ok, ko-ko-ro-kok		ong ong	kwak kwak
Finnish	kot kot, kot kot kot, kot-kot-kot kooot kot-kot-kot, pot pot pot	kukkokiekuu, kukkerikuu, kukkuruuruu, kukkuluuruu	klu klu klu	honk honk	kvaak kvaak, kvääk-kvääk-kvääk
French	cot cot, cot cot cot, cot cot codet	cocorico		ca car	coin coin
Georgian	კაკანი (k'ak'ani) (Note: კაკანი. National Library of Georgia (in Georgian). Tbilisi: მერანი. 1991. p. 347. ISBN 5-520-00393-9. Archived from the original on 2024-07-06.), კუ-კუ	ყიყლიყო (qiqliqo)	ყურყლუტი	ყიყინი (q'iq'ini)	
German	gack gack gack, guaguagua	kikeriki		gack gack	quak quak
Greek	κο κο (ko ko), κλο κλο (klo klo) (sitting)	κικιρίκου (kikiriku)			κουάκ κουάκ (kuak kuak)
Hebrew	קוּר־קוּר־קוּר (qur qur qur), (Note: Animals sounds in Hebrew, HaSafa-HaIvrit (The Hebrew Language) web site (in Hebrew)) בָּק־בָּק־בָּק (bàq bàq bàq)	קוּקוּרִיקוּ (quuquuriqu)		גַּע־גַּע (gaqh gaqh)	גַּע־גַּע (gaʕ gaʕ)
Hindi		कुकुड़ूकू (ku-kudu-koo)			
Hungarian	kot-kot-kot-kodács	kukurikú		gá gá	háp háp
Icelandic		gaggalagó			bra bra
Indonesian	petok-petok	kukuruyuk		kwak kwak	kwek kwek
Irish		cuc-adiú-dil-ú			vác
Italian	coccodè	chicchirichi	glu glu	qua qua	qua qua
Japanese	コッコッ (kokko)	コケコッコー (kokekokkō)		ガーガー (gā gā)	ガーガー (gā gā)
Kazakh	қыт-қыт (qyt-qyt)				қақ-қақ (qaq-qaq)
Korean	꼬꼬댁 (kko kko daek)	꼬꼬댁 꼬꼬 (kkokkodaek kko), 꼬끼오 (kko-kki-o)		꽤액-꽤액 (kkwae-aek-kkwae-aek)	꽥꽥 (kkwaek kkwaek)
Latgalian	kā kā	kikerigū, kikerigī, ko ko ko kō		gā gā	
Latin		cocococo			
Latvian	kluk kluk	kikerigū		gā gā	pēk pēk
Lithuanian	kud kudak, ko ko ko	kakarykū, kakariekū	šuldu buldu	gar gar	kva kva
Macedonian		кукурику (kukuriku)			ква ква (kva kva)
Malayalam		കൊക്കരക്കോ (kokarakkoo)			
Marathi		कुकूच-कू (kukooch-koo!)			पक पक (pak pak) (Note: "प्राण्यांचे_आवाज" from the Marathi Wikipedia)
Nepali		kukhuri kaa			braaaq caaq
Norwegian	klukk klukk	kykkeliky			kvakk kvakk
Persian	qod-qod, qod-qod-qodā(s)	qūqūli qū-qū			(Northern) mak-mak
Polish	ko ko ko, kod-kodaak	kukuryku	gul gul	gę gę	kwa kwa kwa, kwak kwak
Portuguese	có có có	cocorocó, cocoricó		quem quem [qüém qüém], qua qua	quá quá, quak quak
Romanian	cotcodac	cucurigu		ga ga	mac mac
Russian	ко-ко-ко (ko-ko-ko), куд-куда (kud-kuda)	кукареку (ku-ka-re-ku)		га-га-га (ga-ga-ga)	кря-кря (krja krja)
Serbian	кокода (kokoda)	кукурику (kukuriku)		га (ga)	квак (kvak)
Sinhalese		කුක්කු කූක් කූ (kuku kūk kuu)			
Slovene	kokodak	kikiriki	godráti, kevdráti	ga ga	kva kvak
Spanish	coc co co coc	quiquiriquí, quiquiriquiquí, cocorocó	glu, glu, glu	cua cua	cua cua
Sundanese		kongkorongok			
Swedish	kluck kluck, kackel	kuckeliku			kvack kvack
Tamil		kokkara-ko-ko		baack baack	kua kua
Telugu		kokkaro-ko			
Thai	กุ๊ก ๆ (kuk kuk)	เอ้กอี๊เอ้กเอ้ก (ek-i-ek-ek)			ก้าบ ๆ (kap kap)
Turkish	gıt-gıt gıdaak	ü-ürü-üüü [yʔyryʔyː]	gulu gulu	vak vak	vak vak
Ukrainian		кукуріку (koo-ku-ri-koo)		ґа-ґа-ґа (ga-ga-ga)	ках ках (kakh kakh)
Uropi					kwa kwa
Vietnamese	(cục ta) cục tác	ò ó o (oooooo)		quạc quạc, cà kếu	cạp cạp

==== Wild birds ====
Language	Bird singing	Crow calling	Owl hooting
Afrikaans	twiet twiet	Kraai	hoe-hoe
Albanian	ciu-ciu	krra-krra	ku-ku
Arabic	سِقسِق (siqsiq), غِرد (gharid) (to chirp), زِيو زِيو (ziw ziw)	قاقا (qà qà), نعيق (na'eeq), (Note: الباحث العربي: قاموس عربي عربي) / نعيب (na'eeb) (Note: الباحث العربي: قاموس عربي عربي)	
Armenian	ճիւ ճիւ (jiv jiv)	կաաք, կաաք (gaak, gaak)	պու պու (boo boo)
Basque	txio-txio	karra-karra	hu-hu-hu
Bengali	kichir michir	কা কা (ka ka)	huup huup
Bosnian	čip čip		
Bulgarian	чик-чирик (chik-chirik)	га га (ga ga)	бууу (buuu)
Catalan	piu-piu, xiu-xiu	òc-òc	xut
Chinese, Cantonese		呱呱 (gua, gua)	
Chinese, Mandarin	叽叽喳喳 (jī jī zhā zhā) (Note: "叽叽喳喳" in Han Dian online dictionary)	哑哑 (yā yā) (Note: "哑哑" in Han Dian online dictionary)	
Croatian	živ živ, dživ dživ	kra kra	hu hu
Czech	píp píp, cvrliki	krá krá	hůůů
Danish	pip pip, kvit kvit, kvittevit	kra kra	
Dutch	twiet twiet, tjierp, tjielp, tsjilp	kra kra	oehoe
English	chirp chirp, tweet tweet, cheep cheep, peep peep	caw caw	hoo hoo, twit twoo (AUS), toowit toowoo
Estonian	siuts siuts, siit siit, tsirr tsirr, sirts sirts, siu siu	kraaks kraaks	uhuu
Filipino	twit twit	wák wák	
Finnish	tsirp tsirp, tviit tviit, piip piip, ti-ti-tyy (great tit), kukkuu (common cuckoo)	kraa kraa, kraaak	huhuu, huu-u huhuu-u, pu-pu-pu
French	cui cui, piou piou	crôa crôa	ouh ouh
German	piep piep, tschiep	krah krah	hu hu, uh huh
Greek	τσίου τσίου (tsiu tsiu)	κρα κρα (kra kra)	
Hebrew	צִיף־צִיף (tsif tsif), צְוִיץ־צְוִיץ (tswits tswits)	קְרָע־קְרָע (qràqh qràqh)	הוּ־הוווּ (hu-huuu)
Hindi	चेचे (cheh cheh)	कौ कौ (kau kau)	गुटरगूं (guṭargu)
Hungarian	csip-csirip	kár kár	hú hú
Icelandic	bíbí, tvít tvít	krúnk krúnk	ú ú
Indonesian	cit-cit, cicitcuit	kaa kaa, kak kak	kuk-kuk
Italian	cip cip, pio pio (chick)	cra cra	huu huu
Japanese	(chick) ピヨ ピヨ (piyo piyo), ひいひい (hī, hī), チュンチュン (chun chun)	カアカア (kaa kaa), ガアガア (gaa gaa)	ホウホウ (hō hō)
Kannada		kha-kha	
Kazakh	шыр-шыр (shyr-shyr), шық-шық (shyq-shyq)	қарқ-қарқ (qarq-qarq)	
Korean	짹짹 (jjaek jjaek)	까악까악 (kkaak kkaak)	부엉부엉 (bu-eong)
Latgalian		krā	
Latvian	čiu čiu, čiv čiv	krā	u-hū
Lithuanian	čik čirik, čyru vyru	kar kar	
Macedonian	чурулик чурулик (churulik churulik)	гра гра (gra gra)	
Malay	cip cip		
Malayalam	കൂ കൂ (coo coo)	ക്രാ ക്രാ (kra kra)	
Marathi	किलबिल (kil-bil), छिव-छिव (chiw-chiw), कुहू-कुहू (coohoo-coohoo), किल-किल (kil-kil), काव-काव (kaw-kaw)	काव-काव (kav-kav)	
Norwegian		kra kra	
Persian	چه‌چه (čah-čah), چهچهه (čah-čahe)	قارقار (qār-qār)	
Polish	ćwierk, ćwir ćwir, ćwirk, czyr czyr, czyrk, fiu-fiu, kuku (cuckoo), ti ti ti, ti-riit	kra kra, krak	hu-huuu
Portuguese	piu piu	cra cra	u-huu
Romanian	cip cirip, piu piu	cra cra	hu-huuu
Russian	чирик-чирик (chirik-chirik), чик-чирик (chik-chirik), чив-чив (chiv-chiv)	кар-кар (kar kar)	угу (ugu), уху (ukhu)
Serbian	ћију-ћију (ćiju-ćiju)	кра-кра (kra-kra)	
Sinhalese	කුමු-කුමු (kumu kumu)	කාක්-කාක් (kāk kāk)	
Slovak	píp píp, čvirik, čvirik		
Slovene	čiv čiv	kra kra	hu hu
Spanish	pío pío	cuaa cuaaa, uacc uac	uh, uh
Swedish	kvitter kvitter	kra kra, krax krax	ho-hoo
Tamil	koo koo	kaa kaa	
Telugu		kaau kaau	
Thai	จิ๊บ ๆ (chip chip)	กา กา (ka ka; ka also means a crow)	ฮูก ๆ (huk huk)
Turkish	cik cik [dʒik dʒik], cibili cibili, şak şak	gaak gaak	gu guk guuk
Ukrainian	тьох-тьох (t'okh-t'okh), фіть-фіть (fit'-fit')		
Vietnamese	chíp chíp	quạ quạ (quạ also means a crow)	hu hú, cu cu

=== Mammal sounds ===
==== Cats and dogs ====
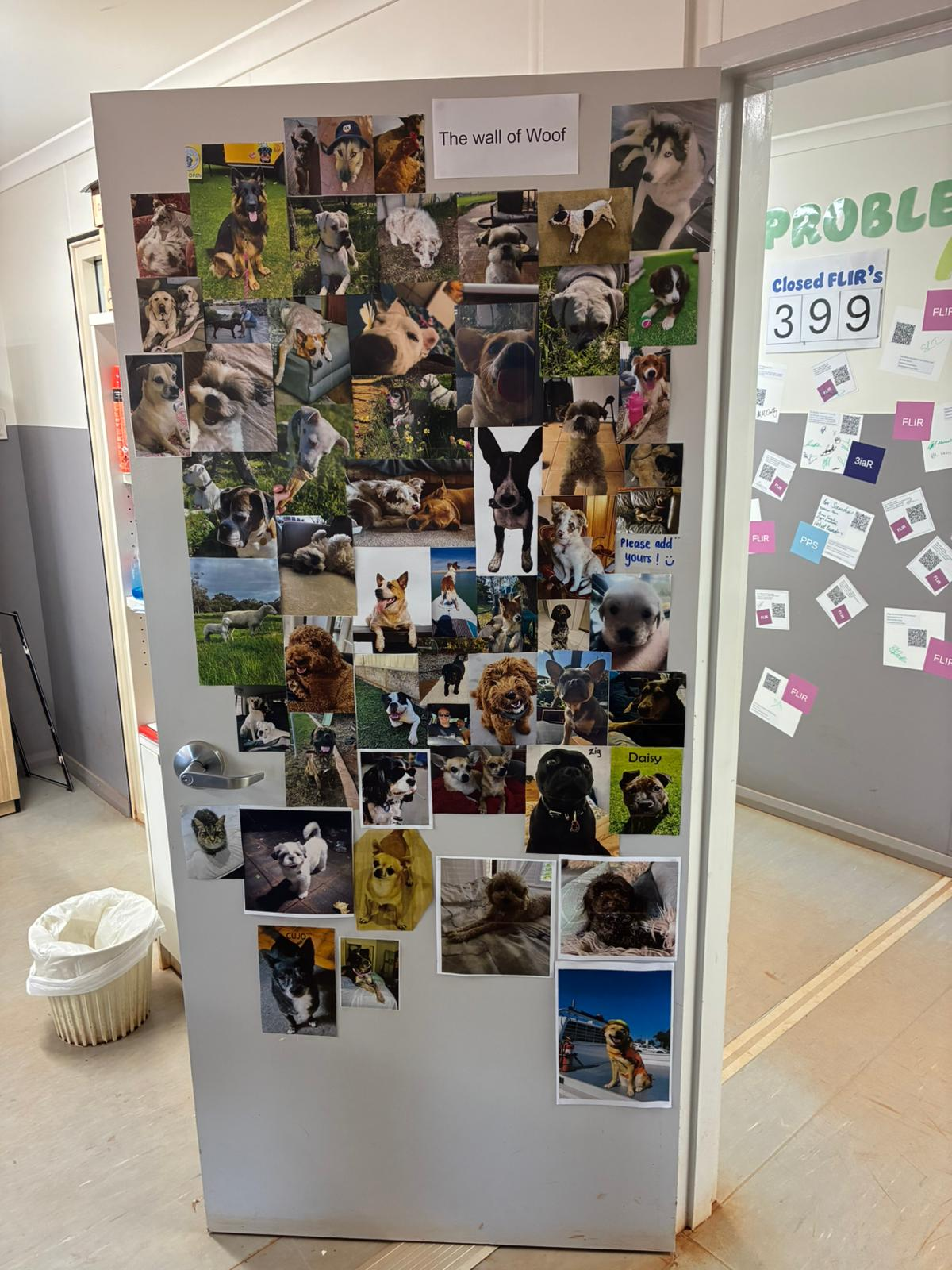
An example of everyday use of onomatopoeia in a workplace at a West Australian mine site in the Pilbara.

Language	Cat meowing	Dog barking	Dog or wolf howling
Afrikaans	miaau	Small dogs woef & large dogs boef	Ba-hoe
Albanian	mjau-mjau	ham ham, hum-hum, gam-gam, uof-uof	huu, auu
Arabic	مُواَء (muwà-) مياو (miao)	نباح (nibaah), haw haw, hab hab	عواء (awoooo)
Armenian	միաւ (mee-av)	հաւ հաւ (hav hav)	
Basque	mau	au-au, txau-txau (small dogs), zaunk-zaunk (big dogs)	ulu-ulu
Batak	ngeong	kung-kung	auuung
Bengali	মিউ মিউ (miu miu)	ঘেউ ঘেউ (gheu gheu), ভেউ ভেউ (bheu bheu), ভউ ভউ (bhou bhou)	huukka huuya
Bulgarian	мяу (mjau)	бау бау (bau bau), джаф джаф (djaff djaff)	аууу (auuu)
Catalan	marramèu, mèu [(mərə)ˈmɛw], marramau, mau	bup-bup, bub-bub	auu, ahú
Chinese, Cantonese	喵喵 (mēu-mēu)	㕵㕵 (wōu-wōu)	
Chinese, Mandarin	喵 (miāo) (Note: "喵" in Han Dian online dictionary)	汪汪 (wāng wāng) (Note: "汪汪" in Han Dian online dictionary)	
Croatian	mijau; mrnjau (tomcat)	vau vau	auuuuu
Czech	mňau [mɲau]	haf haf	aúúú
Danish	mjau, mjav, miau, miav	vuf vuf, vov vov, bjæf bjæf	
Dutch	miauw, mauw	waf waf, woef woef	
Egyptian	mjw (miu)		
English	miaow (UK), meow (US)	woof, arf, bow wow, ruff, bark, yap yap, yip yip (small dog)	awoo, aroo
Estonian	mäu, mjäu, näu, njau, kurnjau	auh auh	
Filipino	meyaw, miyaw, ngiyaw	aw aw	
Finnish	miau, mau, nau, kurnau, purnau	hau hau, vuh vuh	auuu, vouuu
French	miaou [mja.u]	ouah ouah, ouaf ouaf, wouf wouf	aoouu
Galician		jau jau	
German	miau	wau wau, waff waff, wuff wuff	
Greek	νιάου (niau)	γαβ γαβ (ghav ghav)	αουυυ (auuu)
Hebrew	מְיָאוּ (miàw)	הַב־הַב (hav hav), הַאוּ־הַאוּ (haw haw)	אַאוווּ (awooo)
Hindi	म्याऊँ म्याऊँ (myaau, myaaoo)	भौ भौ (bhau bhau)	अऊऽऽऽ (auuuu)
Hungarian	miaú, nyau	vau vau	
Icelandic	mjá	voff voff	
Indonesian	meong	guk guk	auuu
Italian	miao, miau, mao	bau bau	auuu
Japanese	ニャー (nyā)	ワンワン (wan wan), アウアウ (au au, smaller dogs)	ワオーン (waōn), アオーン (aōn)
Kannada		bow bow	
Kazakh	мияу-мияу (mijau-mijau)	арп-арп (arp-arp), шәу-шәу (shau-shau)	ұұұ (üüü)
Korean	야옹 (yaong)	멍멍 (meong meong)	아우우우 (a-uuu)
Latgalian	ņau ņau	vau vau	
Latvian	mjau, ņau	vau	
Lithuanian	miau	au au	aūūū
Macedonian	мјау (mjau)	ав ав (av av), џав џав (dzhav dzhav)	
Malayalam	ങ്യാവൂ ങ്യാവൂ (ngyaoo ngyaoo)	ബൌ ബൌ (bau bau)	
Malay	اياو (iau)		
Marathi	म्यांव (meow/myao)	भो-भो (bho bho)	कुई (kuii)
Nepali	म्याउँ ([mjãũ̯])	भौ-भौ ([bʱʌu̯bʱʌu̯])	
Norwegian	mjau	voff voff, vov vov	
Persian	میومیو (mioo mioo)	واق واق (vāq vāq), هاف هاف (hāf-hāf)	
Polish	miau, miauk, mru (purr), mrrr (purr)	hau hau	ałuuu, a-uuu
Portuguese	miau	au au, ão ão, béu béu	auuu
Romanian	miau	ham ham	auuu
Russian	мяу (mjau), мур (mur, purr)	гав-гав (gav gav, big dogs), тяф-тяф (tyaf tyaf, small dogs)	у-у-у (wu-u-u)
Serbian	мњау (mnjau)	ав ав (av av)	ауууу (auuu)
Sinhalese	ඤාවු (ñāvu)	බුඃ බුඃ (buh buh)	
Slovak	mňau	hav-hav, hau-hau, haf-haf	
Slovene	mijav	hov hov	auuu
Spanish	miau [ˈmjaw]	guau guau	auuu
Swedish	mjau, mjao, jam	vov vov, voff voff	
Tamil	மியா (miaow(m))	லொள் லொள் (loll-loll), vovw-vovw, vazh vazh	
Telugu	miao(m)	bau bau	
Thai	เมี้ยว (miao), แง้ว (ngaew)	โฮ่ง ๆ (hong hong), บ๊อก ๆ (bok bok)	โบร๋ว์ (brow)
Turkish	miyav	hav hav	auuu
Ukrainian	няв (niav)	гав (hav)	
Urdu	meow		
Uropi	miaw	waw waw	
Vietnamese	meo	gâu gâu, sủa sủa	
Volapük	miov		
Welsh	miaw		

==== Equine sounds ====
Language	Horse whinnying	Horse trotting	Horse galloping	Donkey braying
Afrikaans	runnik	poetiekop-poetiekop		hie hô
Albanian	iihihihi	trro-trro, trrok-trrok		ia-ia, ioo-ioo
Arabic	صهيل (saheel)	deregin-deregin		نهيق (naheeq)
Basque	iiiiii	traka-traka		aja-ja
Bengali	chi hni	tag bag	tag bag	
Bulgarian		тъгъдък тъгъдък (tagadak tagadak)		и-аа и-аа (i-aa i-aa)
Catalan	hiii, iii	toc-toc toc-toc [tɔk tɔk]	to-co-toc to-co-toc [tɔkɔ:tɔk]	i-aaa, ihà
Croatian	njihaa	klop klop		i-a
Czech	íí-hahá			íí-áá
Danish	vrinsk	gadagung gadagung		
Dutch	niii, hiii		kataklop kataklop	ie-aa
English	neigh	clip clop	gallop	hee-haw
Estonian	ii-ha-haa	koppadi kopp		
Finnish	ii-ha-haa, hirnau	klip-klop	kopoti kopoti, koppoti koppoti	ihaa, hii-haa, hii-hoo
French	hiii hiii	pa-ta-clop	cataclop cataclop, dougoudoum dougoudoum	hi han
German	wiehiehie			i-ah
Hebrew	הִי־הִי (hii hii)			אִי־אָה (-i-à)
Hindi	हिं-हिं (hin-hina)	तग्ड़क-तग्ड़क (tagṛak-tagṛak)		ढैंचू ढैंचू (Dhai.nchu Dhai.nchu)
Hungarian	nyihaha	klop-klop-klop		i-á
Icelandic	hneggja			
Indonesian				yihaa
Italian	hiii hiii	clop-clop-clop, cloppete clappete		ih oh
Japanese	ヒーン (hīn)	ガラガラ (gara-gara)	パカラッパカラッ (pakarap-pakara)	
Kazakh	мияу-мияу (mijau-mijau)	арп-арп (arp-arp), шәу-шәу (shau-shau)	ұұұ (üüü)	
Korean	히잉 (hi-ing)	다그닥 다그닥 (dag-dak dag-dak)		
Latin	hinni			
Latvian	ī-ā	klap klap	dipada-dapada	
Lithuanian	yhaha, ygaga	taukšt-taukšt	tau tau ta-taukšt	i-haaa
Marathi		tagdak-tagdak तग्डक-तग्डक		
Norwegian	vrinsk			
Persian	šīhe (شیهه)	pūtikā pūtikā		عرعر (ar-ar)
Polish	iii-haaa, ihaha	kla kla, kla-klo kla-klo (actually /ˈǃˈǃʷ ˈǃˈǃʷ/, but with the mouth alternately opening and almost closing)	patataj patataj (stressed on the last syllable)	iii-haa, i-o
Portuguese	hi hi	pocotó pocotó		ii-á, ii-ó
Romanian	ni-ha-ha	trop trop		i-ha
Russian	и-го-го (i-go-go)	цок-цок (tsok-tsok) (colloquial), тыгыдык-тыгыдык (tygydyk-tygydyk), тыгдым-тыгдым (tygdym-tygdym)		ии-а (ii-a)
Serbian	њиии (njiii)	клоп-клоп-клоп (klop-klop-klop)		њи-ааа (nji-aaa)
Slovenian	iha, ihaha	klop klop		i-a
Spanish	ji ji	tucutun tucutun		i-o
Swedish	gnägg			
Tagalog	hihihi haha			
Thai	ฮี้ ๆ (hii hii)	กุบกับ กุบกับ (kupkap kupkap)		
Turkish	ih-hi-i-i	dıgı-dıg dıgı-dıg		aa-ii
Vietnamese	hí hí hí	nhong nhong	cà lộc	

==== Animals with cloven hooves ====
Language	Cow mooing	Sheep bleating	Goat bleating	Pig grunting	Pig squealing
Afrikaans	moe	mê		oink-oink	
Albanian	muu	behehe, bee	behehe, bee	hunk-hunk	
Arabic	moo, ngoah	امباع (mbaa), مأة (maa' )	ثغاء	قباع (qibaa)	
Armenian		մայ (may)			
Basque	mu	mee	bee	kurrin-kurrin	
Bengali	hamba	myaa myaa	byaa byaa/ ম্যা ম্যা(me me)	ghnot ghnot	
Bulgarian	муу (muu)	беее (beee)	меее (meee)	грух грух (gruh gruh)	квич-квич (kvich-kvich)
Catalan	mmm, muu	bèè, mèè	bèè, mèè	oinc-oinc, gronyc	
Chinese, Cantonese		咩 (me1)			
Chinese, Mandarin	哞 (mōu) (Note: "哞" in Han Dian online dictionary)	咩 (miē) (Note: "咩" in Han Dian online dictionary)			
Croatian	muu	bee	mee	rok rok	
Czech	bůů	béé	meee	chro chro	kvík kvík
Danish	muh	mæh		øf øf, (Note: øf - den Danske Ordbog) grynt	
Dutch	boe	bèh, mèh		knor knor	
English	moo	baa	maa, naa	oink oink	
Estonian	ammuu, muu, möö	mää mää		röh röh röh	
Finnish	ammuu, muu, muuh, möö	mää, mähää, bää	mä-ä-ä-ää, bä-ä-ä-ää, mä-kä-kää	röh röh röh, nöf nöf	skviik
French	meuh, mou	bêêh		groin groin, grouik grouik	
Georgian		ვეეე (veee)		ღრუტუ ღრუტუ (ghrutu ghrutu)	
German	muh	mäh		grunz grunz, oink oink	
Greek (ancient)		βῆ (bê)		ko-i ko-i	
Greek (modern)	μoυ (mu)	μεε (mee)			
Hebrew	מוווּ (muuu)	מֶה (meh)		אוֹינְק־אוֹינְק (-oinq -oinq), חְרר־חְרר (xrr xrr)	
Hindi	moo				
Hungarian	mú, bú	bee	mek mek	röf röf, uí uí	
Icelandic	mu	mee			
Indonesian	mooh	mbee, mbek	mbek	grok grok	
Italian	mu	bee		oink oink	
Japanese	モーモー (mō mō)	メーメー (mē mē)	メーメー (mē mē)	ブヒブヒ (buhi buhi), ブーブー (bū bū)	
Kazakh	мөө (moo)			қорс-қорс (qors-qors)	
Korean	음매 (eum-mae)	매 (mae)		꿀꿀 (kkul kkul)	
Kyrgyz		маа (maa)			
Latgalian	mū			ruk ruk, kvī kvī	
Latin		bee			
Latvian	mū	bē, mē		ruk ruk, kvī kvī	
Lithuanian	mū	be		kvy kvy, kvykt kvykt, kriu kriu	
Marathi	हम्मा (hamma)	बँ-बँ (baanh-baanh)			
Norwegian	mø	bæ	mæ	nøff nøff	
Persian	māγ	bā-bā			
Polish	muuu	beee	meee	chrrr chrrr, chrum chrum, chrumk chrumk	kwi kwi, kwik
Portuguese	mu mu	meh	béee	ronc ronc, oinc oinc	
Romanian	mu	meee, beee		groh groh	guiț guiț
Russian	му (mu)	бее-е (beh)	мее-е (meh)	хрю-хрю (hrju hrju)	
Serbian	му (mu)	бее-е (beh)	мее-е (meh)	грок грок (grok grok)	
Slovak	múú	béé	méé	kroch-kroch	kvík-kvík
Slovene	mu	be	me, mekeke		cvi
Spanish	mu	beee	beee	oinc oinc	cuí
Swedish	mu	bä		nöff nöff, grymt grymt	
Tagalog	ungaa			ngok ngok	
Telugu	అంబా (amba)	mae			
Thai	มอ (mo)	แบะ แบะ (bae bae)		อู๊ด ๆ (uut uut), ครอก ๆ (khrok khrok)	
Turkish	mö	mee			
Uropi	mu, muh	bee, beh		grun grun	
Vietnamese	ụm bò	be be	be be	ụt ụt, ụt ịt, ỉn ỉn, ủn ỉn	eng éc
Welsh	mŵ	mê		soch soch	

==== Other mammals ====
Language	Elephant trumpeting	Lion/tiger roaring	Monkey chatting
Afrikaans	trompetter, ronk	brul	boggom, babbel, a-a-a
Albanian	tyy, trryy	arr, grr	i-u-a-a, u-u-a-a
Arabic	نهيم (naheem) (Note: الباحث العربي: قاموس عربي عربي)	زئير (za'ir)	ضحك (duhik)
Bengali		haloom	
Catalan	hiii, iiiii	arrr, brahh, graa	hiii-hii, iiii-iii
Croatian			u-u a-a
Czech			u-u e-e
Dutch	toet	grrr	oe-oe a-a
English	toot, baraag, nrrr	roar, grrr, rawr, roar	oo-ooh a-aah, ook ook, eek eek
Finnish	tööt, trööt, töttöröö	grrr, murr, rrauh, räyhh, roaarh	juk juk juk, tsik tsik
French	braah	roarrr, grrr	ouah ah ah hein
German	töröö		
Hebrew			אוּ־אוּ אַ־אָה (-u-u a-àh)
Hungarian	tü-tü		mak-mak
Indonesian	ngoah	aum	kak kak kak
Italian	baaa	roar	u-u-ah-ah-ah
Japanese	パオーン (paōn)	ガオー (gaō)	ウキウキ (u-ki-u-ki)
Kazakh		арс (ars)	
Korean		어흥 (eo-heung)	우끼끼끼 (u-kki-kki-kki)
Polish	trąb trąb, tru tru, trrr	grrr, wark, wrrr	cha cha cha, chi chi chi, u-u, u-u a-a, u-u-u a-a-a
Portuguese		urawr	u-u-u, u-u-ááá
Romanian		grrrrr	
Russian		р-р-р (rrr)	чи-чи-чи (chi-chi-chi)
Slovenian		grr	
Spanish	biaaah	grrr	iih, iih
Swedish	tuut		
Tagalog	awoo		hoo-hoo-aah
Thai	แป๊น (paen), แปร๊น (praen)	โฮก (hoak)	เจี๊ยก ๆ (chiak chiak)
Turkish		ravr	u-u-a-a
Ukrainian			fru-fru-fru, che-che
Vietnamese	ré, rống	goám, gầm, rống	khẹc khẹc

=== Other animals ===
Language	Bee buzzing	Frog croaking	Snake hissing
Afrikaans	zoem	kwaak	sis
Albanian	bëzz, zhh, vzvzvz	krra-krra	pss
Arabic	طنين (taneen), دوي (dwii)	نقيق (naqiq)	فحيح (fahih)
Armenian,	բզզ (bezuzz), բզզէ (bezuzze)		
Basque	brun-brun	kro-kro	zi-zi
Batak	ngung-ngung		
Bengali	gun gun	মক মক (môk môk), কট কট (kôṭ kôṭ), ghangor ghang	phnosh
Bulgarian,	бззз (bzzz)	ква ква (kva kva)	ссс (sss)
Catalan	bzzz, zum-zum, nyee	ruac ruac, roac roac, rac rac	sss, hss
Chinese, Cantonese	嗡嗡嗡 (jung1 jung1 jung1)	呱呱 (gwek4 gwek2)	
Chinese, Mandarin	嗡嗡 (wēng wēng) (Note: "嗡嗡" in Han Dian online dictionary)	呱呱 (guā guā)	嘶嘶 (sī sī)
Croatian	zum zum, bzzz	kre kre	hsss
Czech	bzzz	kvá kvá	sss
Danish	sum	kvæk kvæk, (Note: kvæk - den Danske Ordbog) græbæk	
Dutch		kwaak kwaak	
English	buzz, bzzz, (in rural English (as mentioned in Joel Chandler Harris's "Uncle Remus" stories), zoon)	(USA) ribbit, gribbit; (Britain) croak	hiss, sss
Estonian	summ-summ-summ	krooks krooks	
Finnish	surr, surrur, bzzz	kuak-kuak, kurr kurr, kroak, kvaak	hssss
French	bzzz	croa croa	siff
Galician		cro cro	
German	summ	gribbit, quaak	zisch
Greek		brekekekex koax koax (ancient, likely Rana ridibunda), κουάξ κουάξ (kuaks kuaks)	
Hebrew	בְּזזז (bzzz), זוּם־זוּם (zum zum)	קְוָה־קְוָה (qwà qwà)	סְסס (sss)
Hindi		tarr tarr	hiss
Hungarian	zümm	brekeke, brekk, kutykurutty, kvákk	sssz
Indonesian	nguing	krok krok	
Italian	bzzz, zumm	cra cra, cri cri	pisss
Japanese	ブーン (būn)	ケロケロ (kero kero)	シャー (shā)
Kazakh		бақ-бақ (baq-baq)	
Korean	붕 (bung), 윙 (wing), 웽 (weng)	개굴개굴 (gaegul gaegul)	
Latgalian		kvak kvak, kvā kvā, kvarr kvarr	
Latvian	bzz, zumm	kvā kvā	
Lithuanian		kva kva	
Macedonian		кре кре (crè crè)	
Marathi	zzz	डरांव-डरांव (darav-darav)	फुस्स (phusss)
Norwegian	sum sum	kvekk kvekk, kvakk kvakk	
Nepali	bhun bhun, bhununu		
Persian	vez-vez	qūr-qūr	fūke, fūff
Polish	bzyk, bzzz, zzz	kum kum, rebet rebet, rech rech, rechu rechu	sss
Portuguese	zum zum, bzzz	croac croac	sss
Romanian	bâzzz	oac oac	sss
Russian	жжж (zhhh)	ква ква (kva kva)	шшш (shhh)
Serbian	zum zum, bzz	кре кре (kre kre)	
Sinhalese		බක බක baka baka	
Slovene	bzzz	kvak kvak, rega kvak	
Spanish	zum	croac croac	sss
Swedish	surr surr	kvack kvack, ko ack ack ack, kväk	väs
Tagalog	zzz	kokak kokak	sss
Telugu		beka beka	buss
Thai	หึ่ง ๆ (hueng hueng)	อ๊บ ๆ (op op)	ฟ่อ (fo)
Turkish	vızz	vrak vrak	tısss
Ukrainian		ква-ква (kva kva), (Note: "КВА" in «Словник української мови») кум-кум (kum kum), (Note: "КУМ" in «Словник української мови») квок-квок (kvok kvok)	
Vietnamese		ồm ộp, ộp ộp	

== Collisions, bursts, and strikes ==
=== Balloon or bubble bursting ===
- In Albanian, pau, puf
- In Arabic, pakh, poof
- In Batak, tak
- In Bemba, pobo
- In Bengali, phat, phatash
- In Bulgarian, puc пук, pa па
- In Croatian, puk
- In Czech, puf
- In Danish, bang, knald
- In Dutch, pang, pof, paf, poef
- In English, pop, bang
- In Estonian, pops
- In Finnish, poks, pof, pam
- In French, bang, pop
- In German, bäng, peng, plop
- In Greek, bam μπαμ, bum μπουμ
- In Hindi, thaa, phatt
- In Hungarian, pukk (quieter); durr, bumm, bámm (louder)
- In Indonesian, dor
- In Italian, bum
- In Japanese, pan パンッ
- In Korean, ppang 빵, ppeong 뻥, pang 팡, peong 펑
- In Latvian, bliukš
- In Lithuanian, pokšt
- In Macedonian, pau пау
- In Marathi, Dhum ढुम्
- In Navajo, dǫǫn (nasalised o)
- In Persian, poloq
- In Polish, bum, puk, pyk
- In Portuguese, pá, bum
- In Romanian, poc
- In Russian, bakh бах
- In Serbian, puk
- In Slovene, pok
- In Spanish, pop
- In Swedish, poff
- In Tagalog, putók, pak
- In Thai, โป๊ะ (po), ปั้ง (pang)
- In Turkish, bom
- In Vietnamese, bốp, bụp

=== Cannon firing; gunshot; machine gun fire ===
- In Afrikaans, kaboem; boem; ra-tat-tat
- In Albanian, pum-pum; bau-bau, ta-ta-ta-ta, du-du-du-du
- In Arabic, bom; bov, tokh طخ
- In Basque, bunba; danba; ta-ta-ta-ta-ta
- In Bengali, goom goom
- In Bulgarian, bum бум, kh кх, tatatata тататата
- In Catalan, buuum, pumba; pam, pum; ratatatatà
- In Chinese, Mandarin, pēng 砰; ping, pa 乒, 啪; da da da... 嗒嗒嗒
- In Croatian, bum, pam, puf, ratatata
- In Czech, bum, prásk, ratatata
- In Danish, bang, bum
- In Dutch, boem, biem; pang, pauw; ratatata, trrrr
- In English, bam, boom, blam, kaboom; bang, pow; rat-at-at-at-at-at, gat-gat-gat-gat, skkrrt skkrrt, dakka-dakka
- In Estonian, põmm, kõmm; pauh, karpauh
- In Finnish, pum; pam; ra-ta-ta-ta-ta-ta, rä-tä-tä-tä-tä-tä, taka-taka-taka...
- In French, boum; pan
- In German, bumm, rumms, kawumm; peng, puff, päng; rat-tat-tat-tat
- In Greek, cabum, bum μπουμ, bam μπαμ; bam, pan, piu-piu (mainly by children); trrrrrr
- In Hebrew, bum בּוּם
- In Hindi, thaa
- In Hungarian bumm, dörr; ratata, trrrrr
- In Icelandic, búmm; bamm
- In Indonesian, dor,
- In Italian, bum; bang; pum
- In Japanese, バーンバーン (bān bān), dōn ドーン, bakyūn バキューン
- In Kannada, dum, dhaam
- In Kazakh, bydyrsch быдырщ
- In Korean, ppang 빵, tang 탕
- In Latvian, bum
- In Lithuanian, bumpt, bum, pokšt
- In Macedonian, bum бум; pau пау; ra ta ta ta ра та та та
- In Marathi, Dhishkyaon ढिश्क्यँव, dhishum धिशुम
- In Persian, bang
- In Polish: bach, bam, bum-bum; bang-bang, pif-paf and others; tra ta ta ta ta
- In Portuguese, bam, boom, cabum; pá, pum; ratátátá
- In Romanian, bum; poc
- In Russian, ba-bakh ба-бах; pif-paf пиф-паф; tra-ta-ta тра-та-та
- In Sinhalese, ḍisum ඩිසුම්; ḍung ඩුං; ḍaka-ḍaka-ḍaka ඩක-ඩක-ඩක
- In Slovene, ratatata, pok
- In Spanish, pum; bang; praca
- In Swedish, bom; pang, bang
- In Tagalog, boom; boogsh
- In Tamil, dishum; dumeel
- In Telugu, dishyoom
- In Thai, ตูม (tuum, cannon firing); ปัง (pang, gunshot)
- In Turkish, bom, bam, güm, dıkşınyaa (by kids)
- In Uropi, bam (cannon), pang (gun)
- In Vietnamese, đoàng (louder); pằng (quieter); bùm (usually for cannons)

=== Crash ===
- In Albanian, pum, bau, përrtaf,
- In Afrikaans, doef, kadoef
- In Arabic, bom, tàkh, tràkh
- In Basque: danba, pun, plaust
- In Bengali: ṭhash ঠাস, ṭhush ঠুস, dhum ধুম, dham ধাম, daram, dhapash
- In Bulgarian, bum бум, dum дум, trjas тряс, pras прас
- In Catalan, bumba, catacrac, patam, paf
- In Chinese, Mandarin, hong 轰
- In Croatian, bum, tres, krašš
- In Czech, řach, bum, prásk
- In Danish, bum, bump, bang, krasj
- In Dutch, boem, knal, plof, bam
- In English, boom, bam, wham, slam, bang, crash, clash, pow, thonk, thunk, thud, clang
- In Estonian, prõmm, pauh, piraki, karpauh
- In Finnish, pam, pum, ryskis, kolin, räiskis, rymmps
- In French, bing, bang, boum, bam, vlan
- In German, rumms, bumms, bauz, krach, knall
- In Gilbertese, beeku
- In Greek, bam μπαμ, gcup
- In Haitian Creole, bip
- In Hebrew, bum בּוּם, trax טְרַאח (Note: "Bang" in Babylon dictionary)
- In Hindi, dhishumm धिशुम्म, dhishum धिशुम
- In Hungarian, dzzs, bumm, bamm, puff, paff, csatt, nyekk
- In Indonesian, buk, brekk, j'derr
- In Italian, bum, badabeu, patatraf
- In Japanese, ガーン (gān)
- In Korean, kung 쿵
- In Kyrgyz, тарс
- In Latin, tuxtax
- In Latvian, bum
- In Lithuanian, bumpt, bum
- In Macedonian, bum бум, pam пам, pum пум, dum дум, très трес
- In Malay, gedebak-gedebuk, beng
- In Marathi, dhadaam धडाम्
- In Polish, bach, bam, bum, łu, łup, trach, trzask
- In Portuguese, crash, boom
- In Romanian, bum, buf, pac, poc, trosc, zbang
- In Russian, bum бум
- In Sinhalese, daḍas දඩස්
- in Slovene, bum, tresk
- In Spanish, bum, catapum, crash
- In Swedish, krasch
- In Tagalog, ka-boom
- In Tamil, dhishumm, dhishum
- In Thai, โครม (khrom)
- In Turkish, güm, bam, dıkş, çat, pat, zbam
- In Vietnamese, ầm, rầm

=== Door or floor creaking ===
- In Albanian, grr
- In Afrikaans, kraak
- In Bulgarian, skratz скръц
- In Arabic, azeeez أزيـــز
- In Catalan, nyieec, nyeeec
- In Croatian, škrip
- In Czech, vrrzzz, skřííííp
- In Danish, knirk
- In Dutch, kraak
- In English, creak
- In Estonian, kriiks, kriuks
- In Finnish, kriik, narsk, nari nari nari; nirin, narin, nirsk
- In French, crac
- In German, knarz
- In Hindi, charrr
- In Hungarian, nyííí
- In Indonesian, krieeet
- In Italian, criiic, craaac
- In Japanese, gī ギー
- In Kazakh, shiiq шииқ
- In Korean, ppi-geok 삐걱
- In Kyrgyz, кыйч
- In Latvian, čīk
- In Malay, eeek (keriang-keriut)
- In Polish, skrzyp
- In Persian, γež-γež غژ غژ
- In Romanian, scârț
- In Russian, skreep скрип
- In Spanish, ñyeec, ñyiic
- In Swedish, knarr
- In Tagalog, ekk
- In Thai, แอ๊ด (aet)
- In Turkish, gıcır, gıcırt
- In Uropi, krak
- In Vietnamese, kétttt, ken két, cọt kẹt, kẽo kẹt

=== Engine back-firing while freewheeling ===
- In Afrikaans, prrr-pa
- In Albanian, përr-përr-përr, dum-dum-dum
- In Batak, put-put-put, doput-doput
- In Italian, rrra-tatatatata...
- In Malay, prreng prreng
- In Polish, pyr pyr pyr
- In Romanian, pâr pâr
- In Russian, dyr-dyr-dyr дыр-дыр-дыр
- In Spanish, tac tac tac

=== Knocking ===
- In Albanian, tak-tak, tok-tok, trok-trok
- In Arabic, daqqa دَقَّ
- In Afrikaans, klop-klop, tok-tok
- In Batak, tok-tok-tok
- In Bengali, khat khat, takatak, thok thok
- In Bosnian, kuc kuc
- In Bulgarian, chuc chuc чук чук
- In Catalan, toc toc
- In Chinese, Mandarin, dang dang dang 当当当
- In Croatian, kuc kuc
- In Czech, ťuk ťuk
- In Danish, bank bank
- In Dutch, klop klop
- In English, knock knock, bang bang bang
- In Finnish, kop kop, tok-tok-tok
- In Estonian, kopp kopp
- In French, toc toc
- In German, klopf klopf
- In Greek, τοκ τοκ
- In Hebrew, tuq tuq תּוּק־תּוּק (Note: "תּוּק תּוּק" in Morfix online dictionary)
- In Hindi, thakk thakk
- In Hungarian, kop kop, kip kop
- In Icelandic, bank bank
- In Indonesian, tok tok
- In Italian, toc toc
- In Japanese, コツコツ (kotsu kotsu), kon kon コンコン, ton ton トントン
- In Korean, ttok ttok 똑똑
- In Latvian, tuk tuk
- In Lithuanian, tuk tuk
- In Malay, tok tok tok (ketuk)
- In Marathi, thak-thak ठक्-ठक्
- In Persian, taq-taq
- In Polish, stuk-stuk, stuk-puk, puk-puk
- In Portuguese, toc toc, noque noque, truz truz
- In Romanian, cioc-cioc
- In Russian, tuk-tuk тук-тук
- In Shona, goh-goh-goi
- In Slovenian, tok tok
- In Spanish, toc toc, tun tun
- In Swedish, knack knack
- In Tagalog, tok tok tok
- In Thai, ก๊อก ๆ ๆ (kok kok kok)
- In Turkish, tak tak
- In Vietnamese, cốc cốc, cộc cộc
- In Zulu, nqo nqo nqo

=== Strikes ===
Language	Dull strike	Falling strike	Sharp strike	Wet strike
Afrikaans	doef	plof	klingel, kletter	plons, plas, spat
Albanian	pum, bam, llau	pum, pëlltaf, përrtaf	tink, ting	plluq, pëlltuq, pllaf
Arabic				بلوف (blūf)
Bulgarian	туп (toup), хлоп (khlop)	пльос (plyos), шляп (shlyap)	дзън (dzun)	пльок (plyok)
Catalan			cling, clang, cataclinc-cataclanc	xap, xof, patatxap
Chinese, Cantonese			乒鈴嘭唥 (bìhng līng baang làahng)	
Chinese, Mandarin			哐啷, (Note: "哐啷" in Han Dian online dictionary) (kuāng lāng), 哐当 (kuāng dāng)	啪唧 (pā jī)
Croatian	tup	pljas, tres, bum, tup (Note: University of Zagreb, Faculty of humanities and social sciences, Department of East Slavic languages and literatures, Chair of Russian language, Master Thesis, PROBLEMS IN THE TRANSLATION OF RUSSIAN COMICS (Ivana Ivančić), 2015)	zvek, zvec	šljap
Czech		žuch	cink	plesk
Danish	bump, dunk			plask
Dutch		plof, plop	klink, ring, klingel, rinkel, kletter, tingel	plons
English	knock, bump, rap, thud, boom, thump	plop, splat, thud, thunk, thonk	clang, clink, clank, clunk, chink, dink, tink, plink, ding, ring, ping, ting, jingle, jangle, tinkle, pow, conk	splash, splish, splosh, splat
Estonian				lärts, plärts
Finnish	töks, pöksis, pof	fummmp, tumps, tömps	kilin kolin	loiskis, mäts, pläts, läts, lätsis
French		floc	paf, bim, bam	plouf
German	klopf, plumps, platsch	plumps, patsch, plump	klang, kling, klirr, klimper, klingel, bimmel	patsch, platsch, klatsch, schwapp
Hebrew			זְבֶּנְג (Note: "זְבֶּנְג" in Morfix online dictionary) (zbang)	
Hungarian		puff, paff		platty, placcs
Indonesian		bruk, gedebuk	jieb	crot, byur
Italian				plop
Japanese	ドン (don), ズン (zun)	ぽとり(potori)	カーン (kān)	びちゃっ (bicha)
Korean	퍽 (peok)	턱 (teok)	쨍 (jjaeng), 팅 (ting)	철푸덕 (cheolpudeok), 철퍽 (cheolpeok)
Kyrgyz				чалп (chalp)
Malay				trushh, shushh, pishh
Persian	bāmp	dāmb	jiring	čolop-čolop, pešenge
Polish	bam, łup, łubudu, łubudubu	dup, lu, łu, łubudu (longer, louder)		chlap, chlup, mlask, plask, plum, plumk, plusk
Portuguese	puf, pluft, pum	ploft, paft, catapluft, pimba		tchibum
Romanian	buf	pleosc, fleoșc	jap, harsht, trosc	
Russian	бац (bats)	хлоп (khlop), шлёп (shlyop)	дзынь (dzyn’), звяк (zvyak), клац (klatz)	бултых (bultykh), плюх (plyukh)
Slovene	bum, pof			špljoc
Spanish	toc	plaf, paf	tintin, tilín	splash, plaf
Swedish	dunk, duns			plask
Tagalog		blag, bug		plok
Tamil				chatak
Thai	ตึง (tueng), ตึ้ง (tueng)	โครม (khrohm)	ติ๊ง (ting), ปิ๊ง (ping)	โพล๊ะ (plo), แผละ (plae)
Turkish	pof, pot	pat	çang, çing	şap, şop
Uropi				plac
Vietnamese		bịch	keng, beng	bẹp, phọp

=== Crunch, сracking (of sticks, bones etc.) ===
- In Afrikaans, Kraak
- In Croatian, krc
- In Czech, křup
- In English, crunch, crash, crack
- In Finnish, kräks, krunts, runts, naps, krak, niks, niks naks
- In Hindi, kadhak
- In Hungarian, reccs
- in Polish: chrup, krach, trzask
- In Russian, khryas хрясь, khrust хрусть
- In Slovenian, škrt (škrtati)
- In Turkish, çatır
- In Vietnamese, rắc

== Machinery ==
=== Camera shutter ===
- In Albanian, klik
- In Afrikaans, klik
- In Arabic, chic chic تشك تشك
- In Basque, klisk
- In Batak, ceklek
- In Bulgarian, щрак (shtrak)
- In Catalan, cx, xic, txc or txic
- In Chinese, Mandarin, kā chā咔嚓
- In Croatian, klik
- In Czech, cvak
- In Danish, klik
- In Dutch, klik
- In English, click
- In Estonian, klõps, plõks
- In Finnish, klik
- In French, clic
- In German, klick
- In Hebrew, chik צִ'יק
- In Hungarian, klikk
- In Italian, clic
- In Indonesian, cepret, cekrek
- In Japanese, pasha パシャ
- In Korean, chalkak 찰칵
- In Kyrgyz, чырк
- In Latvian, klik klik
- In Malay, cekek cekek
- In Nepali, [kʰit͡sikːʌ] खिचिक्क
- In Polish, pstryk, klik klik
- In Portuguese, clic clic
- In Romanian, clic
- In Russian, shchyolk щёлк, chik чик
- In Slovenian, klik
- In Spanish, clic
- In Swedish, klick
- In Tagalog, klik
- In Thai, แชะ (chae)
- In Turkish, klik, şlak
- In Uropi, klik
- In Vietnamese, lách cách

=== Car engine revving ===
- In Albanian, vum-vum-vum, përr-përr-përr
- In Afrikaans, wroem, broem
- In Arabic, hunn hunn هن هــن, aan aan آن آن
- In Batak, ngong, ngooongngng
- In Bulgarian, bram-bram бръм-бръм
- In Catalan, rum, rumm
- In Croatian, brum brum, vrum vrum
- In Czech, brmmm brmmm
- In Danish, vrum vrum, brum brum, nøn nøn
- In Dutch, broem, vroem
- In English, vroom vroom, broom broom
- In Estonian, põrr põrr
- In Finnish, vruum vruum, bruum bruum, prööm prööm (spoken)
- In French, vroum vroum
- In German, brumm brumm, wrumm wrumm
- In Hebrew, aan aan אָאן אָאן
- In Hungarian, brum brumm
- In Indonesian, bremmm bremmm, ngeng ngeng
- In Italian, brum brum, vrum vrum
- In Japanese, buroro ブロロ
- In Korean, bureung bureung 부릉부릉
- In Malay, ngeng ngeng, brum brum, vrum vrum, preng preng, ngii ngii
- In Polish, brummm brummmm
- In Portuguese, vruum vruum
- In Romanian, vrum vrum
- In Russian, rrr ppp ru ru ру ру rum rum рум рум
- In Slovenian, brum brum
- In Spanish, rue fun
- In Swedish, brum
- In Telugu, raeyyyyyyy
- In Thai, บรื๊น ๆ (bruen bruen)
- In Turkish, vrum vrum (truck), vrın vrın (car)
- In Vietnamese, bờ rừm

=== Car horn honking ===
- In Albanian, po-po, ty-ty
- In Afrikaans, toet, peep-peep
- In Arabic, beeb beep, طيط-طيط ṭiṭ-ṭiṭ
- In Batak, tot, tooot
- In Bulgarian, bi-biip би-биип
- In Catalan, pipip, mec mec, moc moc
- In Chinese, Mandarin, di di 嘀嘀 or 滴滴
- In Croatian, tu tu, bi bip
- In Czech, tů tů
- In Danish, dyt dyt, båt båt
- In Dutch, toet toet
- In English, honk honk, beep beep, toot toot
- In Estonian, tuut tuut, piip piip
- In Finnish, tööt tööt, tyyt-tyyt
- In French, tut-tut
- In German, tut
- In Greek, bip bip, μπιπ μπιπ
- In Hebrew, bip bip בִּיפּ־בִּיפּ
- In Hungarian, tü-tű, tü-tűt
- In Icelandic. bíb bíb
- In Indonesian, din din
- In Italian, bip bip, biii biii
- In Japanese, pu pū ププー
- In Korean, ppang ppang 빵빵
- In Latvian, pī pī
- In Lithuanian, pyp pyp
- In Malay, pon pon, pot pot, pet pet, pin pin (toy car)
- In Marathi, paa-paa पँ-पँ
- In Norwegian, bært bært
- In Polish, bib-biiib, bip bip, trąb
- In Portuguese, bi-bi or fon-fon
- In Romanian, tiiit! ti-ti!
- In Russian, bi-bi би-би, bi-bip би-бип
- In Slovenian, bi bip
- In Spanish, pi pi, pip pip
- In Swedish, tut tut
- In Tagalog, bip bip
- In Telugu, poy ppoy
- In Thai, ปี๊น ๆ (pin pin)
- In Turkish, düt düt, bip bip, dat dat
- In Uropi, tut
- In Vietnamese, bim bim, pim pim

=== Clock ticking ===
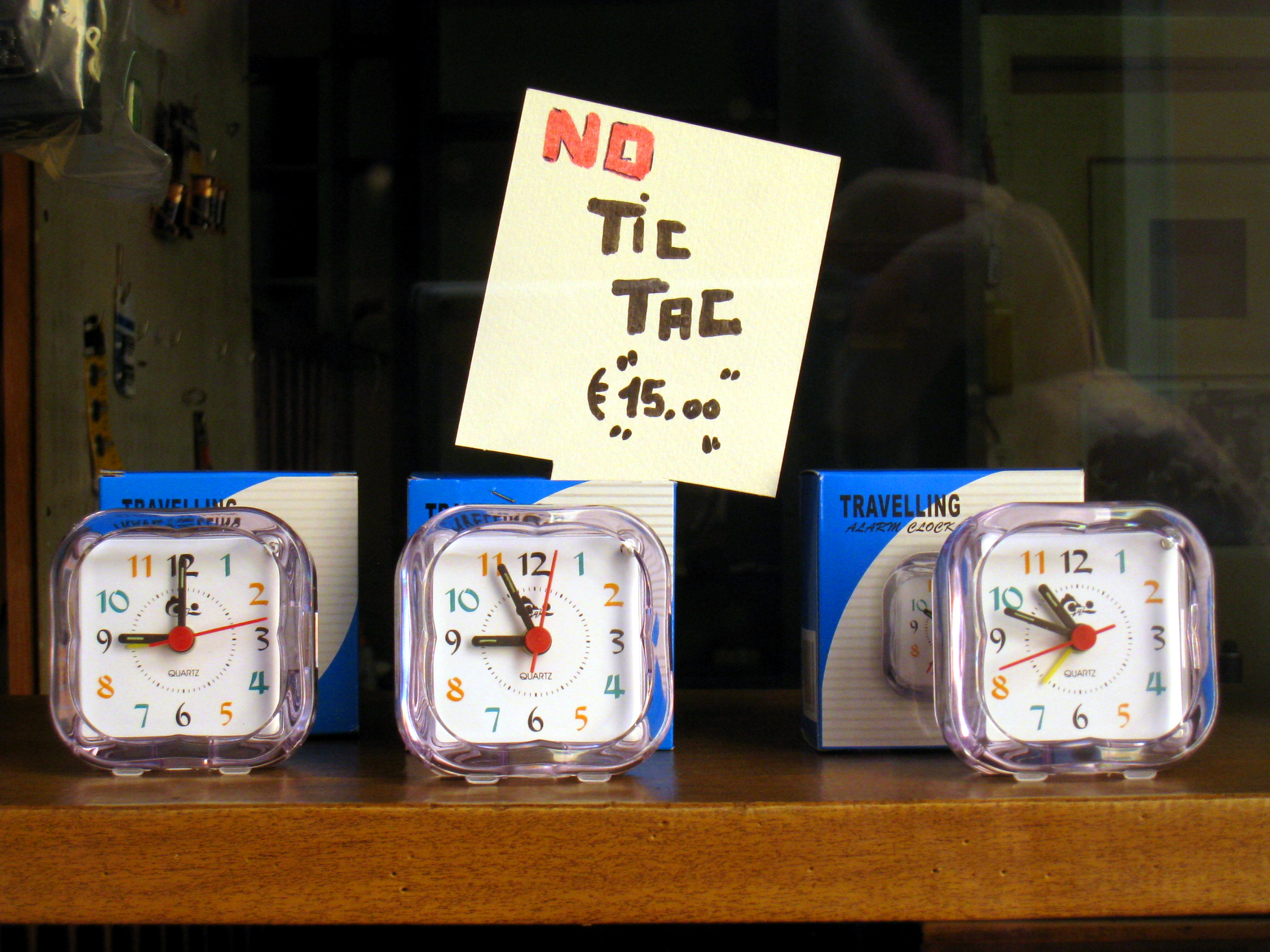
A sign in a shop window in Italy proclaims "No Tic Tac".

- In Albanian, tik-tak
- In Afrikaans, tik-tok
- In Basque, tiki-taka
- In Batak, tik-tak, tik-tak
- In Bengali, tik tik
- In Bulgarian, tic tac тик так
- In Catalan, tic-tac
- In Chinese, Mandarin, dī dā 嘀嗒 (Note: "嘀嗒" in Han Dian online dictionary)
- In Croatian, tik tak
- In Czech, tik ťak
- In Danish, tik tak
- In Dutch, tik tak
- In English, tick tock
- In Estonian, tikk takk
- In Finnish, tik tak, tiki-tiki-tiki, dikdok dikdok dikdok
- In French, tic tac
- In German, tick tack
- In Greek, tic tac τικ τακ
- In Hebrew, tiq taq תִּיק־תַּק (Note: "תִּיק־תַּק" in Morfix online dictionary)
- In Hindi, tic tic
- In Hungarian, tik tak
- In Icelandic, tik tak
- In Indonesian, tik tok
- In Italian, tic toc, tic tac
- In Japanese, チクタク (chikutaku), カチカチ (kachi kachi)
- In Korean ttok-ttak ttok-ttak 똑딱똑딱
- In Latvian, tik tak
- In Lithuanian, tik tak
- In Macedonian, tic tac тик так
- In Malay, tik tok
- In Marathi, tik-tik टिक-टिक
- In Nepali, clit caqq
- In Norwegian tikk takk
- In Polish, tik tak, tik tik, tik tok, tyk tyk
- In Portuguese, tique-taque, tic toc
- In Romanian, tic tac
- In Russian, tik-tak тик-так
- In Slovene, tik tak
- In Spanish, tic tac
- In Swedish, tick tack
- In Tagalog, tik tak tik tak
- In Tamil, tik tik
- In Thai, ติ๊กต็อก (tiktok)
- In Turkish, tik tak
- In Vietnamese, tích tắc
- In Volapük, tiktö

=== Doorbell ringing ===
- In Albanian, tring-tring, ding-dong
- In Afrikaans, trieng
- In Basque, dilin-dalan
- In Catalan, ding-dong, ring-ring, meec...
- In Croatian, din don
- In Danish, ding ding, ring ring
- In Dutch, tring tring
- In English, ding-dong, bing-bong
- In Finnish, pim pom, blim-blom, ding dong, ring-ring
- In French, ding-dong
- In German, klingeling
- In Hungarian, csing-ling
- In Indonesian, ting-tong
- In Italian, din don, drin drin
- In Japanese, ピンポーン (pinpōn)
- In Malay, ding dong, ting tong
- In Marathi, ting-tong टिंग-टौंग
- In Polish, dryń-dryń, dzyń-dzyń
- In Portuguese, ding dong
- In Romanian, țâr țâr
- In Russian, din-don дин-дон
- In Slovenian, din don
- In Spanish, ding dong
- In Swedish, ding dong, pling plong
- In Turkish, zır, ding, ding dong
- In Tagalog, ding dong
- In Thai, ติ๊งต่อง (ting tong), ติ๊งหน่อง (ting nong),
- In Italian, din don

=== Keyboard striking ===
- In Albanian, tok-tok-tok, tëk-tëk-tëk
- In Batak, tik tik
- In Bulgarian, trak-trak трак-трак
- In Catalan, txiquiti-txiquiti, txic txic
- In Czech, klik, ťuk ťuk
- In Danish, klik klik
- In Dutch, tik tik
- In English, click click, click clack
- In Estonian, klõp klõp klõp
- In Finnish, klik klik, klik klak, naks, naputinap (computer), tak tak tak, nakuti nakuti (typewriter), tsäkä-tsäkä-tsäkä (teleprinter)
- In French, clic clic
- In German, klack klack klack (typewriter), tipp tipp tipp (computer)
- In Hebrew, klik klik, קְלִיק־קְלִיק (Note: "קְלִיק" in Morfix online dictionary)
- In Italian, clic clic, tip tap
- In Japanese, kata kata カタカタ
- In Latvian, klikš, klab klab
- In Malay, tek tek tek tek
- In Polish, klik klik
- In Russian, klatz-klatz клац-клац
- In Spanish, tac tac tac
- In Swedish, knapp knapp, klick klick
- In Tagalog, chu ku chu ku chuk
- In Thai, ก้อกแก้ก (kokkaek)
- In Turkish, tıkı tıkı tıkı, tıkır tıkır
- In Vietnamese, lạch cạch

=== Match striking ===
- In Albanian, frrap
- In Bengali, phash
- In English, fwoosh
- In Polish: sss, szszsz
- In Russian, chirk чирк

=== Telephone ringing ===
- In Albanian, tring-tring
- In Afrikaans, trieng trieng
- In Arabic, terren terren تــرن تــرن
- In Basque, tirrin-tirrin
- In Batak, riiing, riiing...
- In Bengali, kring, kring
- In Bulgarian, zan zan зън зън
- In Catalan, ring, ring
- In Chinese, Mandarin, ling ling ling
- In Croatian, drin drin
- In Czech, crrrrr
- In Danish, ring ring, dingeling
- In Dutch, tring tring
- In English, ring ring, brrring brrring, ringaling
- In Estonian, tirr tirr tirr
- In Finnish, ring ring, päläring päläring
- In French, dring dring
- In German, klingeling, klingelingeling
- In Hungarian, csing ling
- In Indonesian, kring kring
- In Italian, drin drin
- In Japanese, jiriririri(n), ジリリリリ(ン)
- In Kazakh, shyryl-shyryl шырыл шырыл
- In Korean, ttareureung ttareureung 따르릉 따르릉
- In Kyrgyz, чырр
- In Latvian, dzin dzin
- In Lithuanian, dzin dzin, dzin dzilin
- In Malay, kring kring, trut trut (berdering)
- In Polish, dryń dryń
- In Portuguese, trimm
- In Romanian, ţâr-ţâr
- In Russian, dzyn’-dzyn’ дзынь-дзынь
- In Slovenian, drin drin
- In Spanish, rin rin
- In Swedish, ring ring
- In Tagalog, kring kring
- In Thai, kring kring กริ๊ง กริ๊ง
- In Turkish, zır zır
- In Vietnamese, reng

=== Siren wailing ===
- In Albanian, iu-iu-iu, auo-auo
- In Afrikaans, pie-pô
- In Arabic, wee-wee
- In Bengali, pay puu
- In Bosnian, ni-na ni-na ni-na, ninu ninu
- In Bulgarian, tii-nu-nii-nu нии-ну-нии-ну
- In Catalan, ninu ni, ni no ni no
- In Croatian, ninu ninu, tinu ninu, viju viju, fiju fiju, tiru liru
- In Danish, ba bu
- In Dutch, Taatuutaatuu
- In English, Nee naw, wee-woo, waow-waow (police), awooga (klaxon),
- In Estonian, Viiu, viiu,
- In Filipino, wang wang wang
- In Finnish, pii paa pii paa, viiuu viiuu viiuu, uu-aa uu-aa, tsiri-tsiri-tsiri viu-viu-viu
- In French, pin pon
- In German, Tatütata
- In Greek, eeuu eeuu ηου-ηου
- In Hungarian, nínó, nénó
- In Indonesian, ninu ninu
- In Italian, nino nino, ta tu-ta tu
- In Japanese, ピーポーピーポー (pīpō pīpō)
- In Korean, ppippo ppippo 삐뽀 삐뽀
- In Latvian, ī-ū
- In Macedonian, piu uiu пиу уиу
- In Malay, nino nino, iyo iyo
- In Norwegian, Bæ bu bæ bu
- In Polish, ioioioio
- In Portuguese, uooooo /uóóóóó/, uiu uiu uiu, tinóni
- In Romanian, ni no ni no
- In Russian, wiu-wiu виу-виу or уиу-уиу
- In Slovene, uiuiui
- In Spanish Wiu Wiu, nino-nino
- In Tamil, aaaaaeeen-neeeeen
- In Thai, ปี๊ป่อ ปี๊ป่อ (pipo pipo), วี้หว่อ วี้หว่อ (wiwo wiwo)
- In Turkish, Daa dii
- In Vietnamese, ò e í e

=== Train whistling ===
- In Albanian, ty-tyy
- In Afrikaans, toe-toe
- In Arabic, toot-toot
- In Bengali, poo
- In Bulgarian, ту-тууу (tu-tuuu)
- In Catalan, tu tu, tu tuut
- In Chinese, Cantonese, 嗚嗚
- In Croatian, ču ču
- In Czech, hůůů
- In Danish, fut fut
- In Dutch, tuutuut
- In English, choo choo, woo woo
- In Estonian, tuut tuut
- In Finnish, tuut tuut
- In French, tchou tchou
- In German, lah nah, spä nö
- In Hebrew, tu-tu טוּ־טוּ
- In Hindi, tree paa tee
- In Hungarian, si-hu-hu-hu
- In Indonesian, tuuut tuuut
- In Italian, tu tuu, ciuf ciuf
- In Japanese, shuppo shuppo シュッポシュッポ
- In Kazakh, чу-чуууу
- In Korean, chik chik pok pok 칙칙폭폭
- In Latvian, tū tū
- In Lithuanian, tū tū
- In Marathi, choo-choo चू-चूऽ
- In Polish, tu-tuuu
- In Portuguese, piuí (Note: Trem da alegria)
- In Romanian, u! uuu!
- In Russian, tu-tuu ту-туу, tu-duu ту-дуу
- In Slovenian, ču ču
- In Spanish, chu chu
- In Swedish, tuut-tuut
- In Tagalog, hup
- In Telugu, koo chuk chuk
- In Thai, ปู๊น ปู๊น (pun pun)
- In Turkish, düt düüt

== Physical and natural phenomena ==
=== Electric flowing (buzzing) ===
- In Albanian, bëzz
- In Afrikaans, zoei
- In English, bzzz buzz
- In Finnish, tzzz, bzzz
- In Hebrew, bzzz בְּזזז, tzzz טְזְזז
- In Japanese, biri biri ビリビリ
- In Korean, jjirit jjirit 찌릿찌릿
- In Latvian, bzz, zumm
- In Polish, bzzzz..., dzzz, zzz
- In Romanian, bâz bzzz
- In Spanish, bzzz
- In Swedish, bzzz
- In Thai, ตืด (tued)

=== Electric shock ===
- In Albanian, zëp, xëp
- In Catalan, pssst.
- In Croatian, bzzzt
- In English, zap
- In Filipino, tssst
- In Finnish, tsäp, pssäht
- In French, zap
- In German, zapp
- In Japanese, biri ビリッ, bachi バチッ
- In Polish, bzyt, bzzt, dzyt, dzzt
- In Turkish, bızt

=== Fire ===
- In Albanian, vu-vu-vu
- In Afrikaans, knetter
- In Basque, su-su
- In Dutch, knetter
- In English, crackle crackle
- In Finnish, riti-räti, ritin-rätin, rätin, rits-räts
- In German, knister knister
- In Hungarian, rip-rop
- In Japanese, Pachi pachi パチパチ
- In Korean, 타닥 tadaak
- In Polish, mlak (flames), syk, trzask
- In Slovene, prsk (prasketati, prsket)
- In Swedish, knaster knaster
- In Thai, พรึ่บ (prueb), พรึ่บ พรั่บ (prueb prub)
- In Turkish, cayır cayır

=== Rain ===
- In English, pitter-patter
- In Finnish, tihu tihu, rips rips rips, ripi ripi ripi
- In French, plic ploc
- In Hebrew, teef tahf טִיף־טַף
- In Hungarian, csipp csepp
- In Japanese, shito shito しとしと
- In Mandarin, xī lì huālā 淅瀝哗啦
- In Russian, kap-kap кап-кап
- In Thai, เปาะแปะ (pau pae)
- In Turkish, şakır şakır

=== Thunder ===
- In Albanian, bau, pëtau, përtau, bubu, bubububum
- In Basque, burrun
- In Batak, huist, rapak, maturapak, dugu-dugu-dugu
- In Bengali, kar kar, gur gur
- In Catalan, brrum
- In English, crack, kaboom, roll, rumble, boom
- In Finnish, jyrin, jyrin järin, jylin, brrumm, brombolom, krrak
- In German, zack, groll, grummel
- In Hebrew, בְּרָק b'raq
- In Hungarian, dörr
- In Japanese, goro goro ゴロゴロ
- In Korean, beonjjeok 번쩍
- In Marathi, kadaad कडाड
- In Marathi, gad-gad गड्-गड्
- In Nepali, [ɡʌɽjaŋɡuɽuŋ] गड्याङ-गुडुङ
- In Polish, grzmot, huk
- In Portuguese, Kabum, buum, boom
- In Romanian, bum
- In Russian, babakh бабах, tararakh тарарах, trakh-tararakh трах-тарарах
- In Slovenian, bum tresk
- In Spanish, brum
- In Swedish, kabrak, muller
- In Tagalog, boom
- In Thai, เปรี้ยง (priang), ครืน ครืน (kruen kruen)

=== Steam hissing ===
- In Afrikaans, sis
- In Albanian, kshhh
- In Arabic, fssss
- In Batak, ssssss
- In Croatian, pššššš
- In English, psss
- In Finnish, tsuuh, piih puuh, tsuh tsuh tsuh, sihi suhi
- In German, zisch
- In Hebrew, psss פְּססס
- In Japanese, pushū プシュー
- In Polish: szelest, szum
- In Romanian, fâs, fsssss
- In Russian, psssh пшшш
- In Spanish, psss
- In Swedish, pssst
- In Tagalog, sssss
- In Thai, ฟู่ (fuu)

=== Water dripping ===
- In Albanian, pik-pik, pim-pim
- In Afrikaans, drip
- In Arabic, tik tik or tok tok
- In Bengali: টুপ টুপ ṭup ṭup ঢিপ ঢিপ ḍhip ḍhip
- In Bulgarian, cap-cap кап-кап
- In Chinese, Cantonese, dihk-dihk 滴滴
- In Chinese, Mandarin, dī dá 滴答 (Note: "滴答" in Han Dian online dictionary)
- In Catalan, plip plip, tip-tip-tip
- In Croatian, kap kap
- In Czech, kap
- In Danish, dryp dryp (dryppe is the verbal), plop plop
- In Dutch, drup drup, drip, drop
- In English, drip drop, plink plonk
- In Estonian, tilks tilks
- In Finnish, tip tip, plip plop, blob blob blob, lits läts
- In French, plic plic/ploc
- In German, plitsch, platsch, tropf
- In Greek, plits plits πλιτς πλιτς, splats splats σπλατς σπλατς
- In Hebrew, tif taf טִיף־טַף
- In Hindi, tipak, tipak
- In Hungarian, csöp-csöp, csip-csöp (csöpp or csepp is also the word for "drop")
- In Indonesian, tik tik
- In Italian, plin plin, plop plop
- In Japanese, ポツポツ (potsu potsu), pota pota ポタポタ
- In Korean, ttokttok 똑똑, ttuk-ttuk 뚝뚝
- In Latvian, pik pik, pak pak, pakš pakš
- In Lithuanian, krapt krapt, krap krap
- In Macedonian, cap cap кап кап
- In Marathi, tap-tap टप-टप
- In Persian, ček ček, čak čak
- In Polish, chlap chlap, chlup chlup, kap kap (kapać is the verb)
- In Portuguese, plim plim, plic plic
- In Romanian, pic pic
- In Russian, kap kap кап-кап
- In Spanish, ploc ploc, pluip pluip
- In Swedish, dripp dropp
- In Tagalog, tuk tuk tuk
- In Tamil, sottu-sottu
- In Telugu, tup tup
- In Thai, ติ๋ง ๆ (ting ting), แหมะ ๆ (mae mae)
- In Turkish, şıp şıp
- In Uropi, plok
- In Vietnamese, tỏng tỏng, toỏng toỏng, tí tách

=== White water ===
- In Batak, soook
- In Finnish, kohin, svuush, jylin (heavy flow), tyrsk, tyrkis (slow flow)

=== Wind blowing or waves flowing ===
- In Albanian, kshh, fëshh
- In Bengali, ভোঁ bhõ, শন শন shôn shôn, ঝির ঝির jhir jhir
- In Basque, firu-firu
- In Bulgarian, fiiuu фииуу
- In Chinese, Mandarin, fuuu
- In Croatian, fiju
- In Czech, fíííí
- In Dutch, woesh, woesj
- In English, whoo, whoosh, swish, rustle, whine, whizz, whistle, wheeze, howl, zoom, sigh, susurrus
- In Finnish, viuuh, viuh vauh, vuush, fiuuh; loisk loisk, liti-läti, lipi lapi
- In French, frou-frou, vromb, murmur, hurl
- In German, huiiih, wutsch, saus, rausch, wein, schwirr, heul, zoom, surr, seufz
- In Greek, fru fru φρού φρού, sfýrigh σφύριγ, url ούρλ, sýrigh σύριγ, thýr θυρ
- In Hindi, sarr sarr, saayein saayein
- In Hungarian, hiss-huss, huss
- In Italian, fiuu, fisch, mormor, url, sussurr
- In Japanese, byuu byuu, pyuu pyuu, zawa zawa, soyo soyo
- In Korean, wing-wing 윙윙
- In Lithuanian, ššš
- In Macedonian, fuuuu fuuuu фуууу фуууу
- In Persian, moj, موج
- In Polish, szszszsz, grzmot (waves during storm), huk, huuuuuu, ryk (waves during storm)
- In Portuguese, Vuuuush
- In Romanian, vâj
- In Russian, uu-u уу-у
- In Spanish, fuuuu fuuuu, fgrrrr frgrrrr, aul, zumb, susurr
- In Swedish, svisch
- In Tagalog, fuuuu fuuuu
- In Tamil, shhhhhhhhhh
- In Telugu, shhhhhhh
- In Thai, วิ้ว วิ้ว (wio wio), ฟิ้ว ฟิ้ว (fio fio)
- In Turkish, vuuuu vuuuu
- In Vietnamese, vi vu, vù vù; rì rào, xào xạc (rustling)

== Others ==
=== Jingling ===
- In Albanian, tring-tring, dring-dring
- In Afrikaans, klingel, klingeling
- In Arabic, خشخش (khashkhash)
- In Armenian, zar zank զար զանկ
- In Basque, tilin-tilin, tilin-talan
- In Batak, giring, giring
- In Bengali, rini-jhini
- In Bulgarian, ljush-bash люш-баш, ding-dong динг-донг
- In Chinese, Cantonese, dìuh-díu fihng 吊吊捹 (吊 means "hang")
- In Chinese, Mandarin, dīng líng 叮铃, (Note: "叮铃" in Han Dian online dictionary) dīng dāng 叮当 (Note: "叮当" in Han Dian online dictionary)
- In Croatian, ding dong
- In Czech, cinky-cink
- In Dutch, tingeling
- In English, clink clank, dingle dangle, jingle jangle
- In Estonian, kill-kõll, kilks-kõlks, kilin-kõlin
- In Finnish, kili-kili-kili, kilin, helin, kilkan-kalkan, kilkati kalkati
- In French, ding-dong
- In German, klingeling
- In Greek, ντινγκ ντανγκ (ding dang)
- In Hebrew, ding-dong דִינְג־דוֹנְג (Note: "דִינְג־דוֹנְג" in Morfix online dictionary)
- In Hungarian, csing-ling, bim-bam, giling-galang
- In Japanese, チリンチリン (chirin chirin), チーン (chīn)
- In Korean, dallang dallang 달랑달랑 ttallang ttallang 딸랑딸랑 jjallang jjallang 짤랑짤랑
- In Latvian, dzin dzin
- In Macedonian, dang, ding, dong данг, динг, донг
- In Malay, ding dong, kring kring
- In Polish, dzyń-dzyń
- In Romanian, ding-dong
- In Russian, din'-don динь-дон dzìnj-dzìnj дзынь-дзынь
- In Spanish, ding ding
- In Swedish, dingelidång kling klang
- In Tagalog, klang klang
- In Tamil, sil-sila silu-sila
- In Thai, เคร้ง (kreng), กรุ๊งกริ๊ง (krung kring)
- In Turkish, çangır çungur, şangır şungur

== Music ==
- In Mandarin Chinese, dōng dōng qiāng 咚咚锵
- In Finnish, humpappaa humpappaa, humppa-humppa-tättärää, jumputi-jumputi (in general); töttöröö, tuut tuut, uumpah uumpah (various brass instruments), städät tädää (bugle); pompoti pompoti, däng däng dong (string bass); twäng, tilu-lilu-lilu (various electric guitars), rämpyti-rämpyti (acoustic guitar); pimputi pimputi (piano); kriik-krääk (violin); bumtsi bam bumtsi bam bam, bum bum zak (drum set)
- In Turkish, düm, tek, teke, tekkâ, and tahek for membranophone sounds.
