= Battle zone =

A battle zone or battlezone is the location of a battle.

Battle Zone or Battlezone may also refer to:

== Games ==
=== Battlezone franchise ===
- Battlezone (1980 video game), an arcade game from Atari
- Battlezone (1998 video game), a first-person shooter/real-time strategy game from Activision
- Battlezone (2008 video game), a remake of the arcade game from Stainless Games
- Battlezone (2016 video game), a multiplayer virtual reality game from Rebellion Developments

=== Other games ===
- BZFlag (a.k.a. Battle Zone: Capture The Flag), an interactive computer game in which tanks play capture the flag
- Battle Zone, the active playing area of Duel Masters Trading Card Game

== Music ==
- Paul Di'Anno's Battlezone, a British heavy rock band
- Battle Zone, a song by Raven from their 1982 album Wiped Out
- Battle Zones, a song by Jag Panzer from their 2003 album Decade of the Nail Spiked Bat

== Other uses ==
- Battle Zone, a Friday segment on Canadian children's show The Zone
- Youngblood Battlezone, a series of comic books
- Battle Zone (film), a 1952 Korean War war film
- Battle Zone, a periodic dancing competition organized by Tommy the Clown
