= Uropi =

International auxiliary language for Europe

- Created by: Joël Landais
- Setting and usage: International auxiliary language
- Purpose: Constructed language: International auxiliary language; A posteriori language; naturalistic planned language(?); Uropi
- Sources: based on Indo-European languages

Official status
- Regulated by: Joël Landais Official website

Language codes
- ISO 639-3: None (mis)
- Glottolog: None
- IETF: art-x-uropi

Uropi is a constructed language which was created by Joël Landais, a French English teacher. Uropi is a synthesis of European languages, explicitly based on their common Indo-European roots, and aims at being used as an international auxiliary language for Europe and thus contributing to building a European identity.

Uropi was begun in 1986; since then, it has undergone certain modifications as its vocabulary continues growing (the French-Uropi dictionary has over 10,000 words).

Uropi became known in Europe in the early 1990s.

== Creator ==
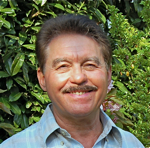
Joël Landais, Uropi Kreator, creator of the auxlang Uropi.

After studying languages at the University of Orléans, then at the Sorbonne and at the École Normale Supérieure in Paris, Joël Landais obtained the Agrégation diploma in English. He speaks French, English, Italian, Spanish and German and has a working knowledge of modern Greek and Russian. Today, he teaches English in a Chartres college. Parallel to his training as a linguist, Landais's travels throughout Europe, Senegal, the Maghreb, Egypt, Mexico, former USSR, Vietnam and the West Indies, together with a passion for languages, led him to create Uropi.

== Orthography and phonology ==
Uropi alphabet
| Upper case | A | B | C | D | E | F | G | H | I | J | K | L | M | N | O | P | R | S | T | U | V | W | X | Y | Z | Ʒ |
| Lower case | a | b | c | d | e | f | g | h | i | j | k | l | m | n | o | p | r | s | t | u | v | w | x | y | z | ʒ |
| IPA phonemes | a | b | ʃ | d | e | f | g | h | i | j | k | l | m | n | o | p | r | s | t | u | v | w | x | y | z | ʒ |

The Uropi alphabet has 26 letters, the 26 letters of the ISO Basic Latin alphabet minus q, plus the letter ʒ, which comes from the International Phonetic Alphabet. Each letter corresponds to a sound and each sound to a letter.

All consonants are pronounced as in English except

- c = [ʃ], which is always pronounced as sh
- g = [g], which is always pronounced as in "give"
- j = [j], which is pronounced as y in "you" or "boy"
- ʒ = [ʒ] which is pronounced as s in "pleasure, measure, leisure"
- r = [r], which is rolled as in Italian, Spanish or Scottish English
- s = [s], which is always pronounced as s in "this" or ss in "boss'", and never as z.
- x = [x], used in foreign names,
- y = [y], used in foreign names,

The vowels a, e, i, o, u are pronounced as in Italian or Spanish, e.g., casa, vino, luna and pepe. Stress normally falls on the main root. For example, in apkebo "to behead", the stress falls on keb "head". However some suffixes (such as -èl indicating an instrument) and the ending -ì for the past are always stressed; when two or more suffixes are combined, the stress always falls on the penultimate suffix. The stress is marked with a written accent (à è ì ò ù) on the stressed vowel when it falls on the last syllable. For example: kotèl "knife", perì "carried", fotò "photo", menù "menu".

== Vocabulary ==
=== Roots ===
Uropi roots can be divided into three categories:

==== Indo-European roots ====
First and foremost Uropi claims to be a way to recreate a unity between Indo-European languages. With this aim, a great many Uropi roots correspond to common Indo-European roots which have been simplified, in their pronunciation and length (very often Uropi roots have one or two syllables). Thus, "mother" is mata (from Indo-European: *mātēr); "sun" is sol (from Indo-European: *sāwel). This simplification corresponds to the natural evolution of Indo-European roots which have given birth to the words which are used today in modern Indo-European languages. Thus mata corresponds to Hindi माता (mātā), and sol to Spanish, Portuguese, Galician and Icelandic sol.

==== "Hybrid" roots ====
When there is no common Indo-European root or when there are several roots to express the same reality in various languages, Uropi may use "hybrid" words, crossing two different roots taken from different languages so as to create the most easily recognizable term for speakers of the greatest number of Indo-European languages. Thus, in liamo "to love", the li- comes from Germanic and Slavic languages (cf. German lieben and Russian любить), and the -am, from Romance languages (amar, amare, amo); or in mand "hand", the ma- comes from Romance languages and the -and, from Germanic languages (cf. Latin manus and German Hand, respectively). This process is not so artificial as it seems at first sight: it has been observed in natural languages, for example, the French haut "high" comes from the crossing between old French aut (from Latin altus) and Frankish hōh. Likewise, the English island comes from the crossing of Old English īeġland (from Proto-Germanic *awjōlandą) and Old French isle (from Latin insula). It has also been deliberately used in languages like English to form new words, called portmanteaus, for instance, the word "smog" comes from the crossing of "smoke" and "fog". Others include franglais (from français + anglais), denglisch (from Deutsch + Englisch), and spanglish (from Spanish + English). These "hybrid" words only account for 3% of Uropi vocabulary.

==== International words ====
Uropi also uses many words which are already "international", like taksì, skol "school", bus, art, matc "match", polìz "police", simfonij "symphony", and tabàk "tobacco".

=== Compounds ===
Like many other conlangs, Uropi uses many compounds, either combining two roots, or using prefixes and suffixes. Among the former, there are the following examples: lucitòr "lighthouse" from luc "light" and tor "tower"; or, from sopo "to sleep", sopisàk "sleeping-bag" and sopivagòn, "sleeper (train)".

There are also numerous examples of compounds built with prefixes or suffixes: for example with davo "to give", disdavo "to distribute" can be formed; with tel "goal, purpose", atelo "end up in, come to", can be formed; with breko "to break" and us "out", usbreko "to break out", can be formed; with apel "apple", aplar "apple tree" and aplaria "apple orchard", can be formed.

In most cases, those compounds reveal the roots and thus the meaning of the compound. However, some of those compounds, even if they follow the etymology of equivalent words in living European languages, have a more obscure, rather metaphorical meaning. Thus, ruspeko, literally "to look back", means "to respect"; or incepo, literally "to seize, to grasp inside", means "to understand" (reminiscent of "to grasp (a concept)").

== Grammar ==
=== Substantives ===
Like some modern Indo-European languages, Uropi has a very limited declension with only two cases: nominative and genitive in the singular and the plural. Uropi substantives are divided into three groups: those ending in a consonant, those ending in -a and those ending in another vowel.

Among those ending in a consonant are all masculine nouns, i.e., nouns denoting men or male animals: man "man"; kat "(tom)cat".

Those nouns take an -e in the plural; the genitive singular is marked with an -i, and the genitive plural with -is: man, mane, mani, manis "man, men, man's, men's".

All feminine nouns, i.e., nouns denoting women or female animals, end in -a: ʒina "woman", kata "(she)cat". These nouns take an -s in the plural. The -a becomes -u in the genitive singular, -us in the genitive plural: gala, galas, galu, galus "hen, hens, hen's, hens'".

All the other substantives are neuter: they can equally end with a consonant or with an -a: for example, tab "table", ment "mind", teatra "theatre", centra "centre". They correspond to the neuter personal pronoun je "it".

The nouns ending with another vowel are essentially "international" words like taksì, eurò, menù. They take an -s in the plural, but no specific mark in the genitive.

=== Adjectives ===
As in English, qualifying adjectives are invariable. They are placed before the noun they qualify. Some are "pure" adjectives: bun "good", glen "green", kurti "short"; others are derived from nouns. In this case, their form is identical to that of the genitive singular of the noun: mani "manly, man's", ʒinu "feminine, woman's".

A few quantitative indefinite adjectives which are also pronouns take an -e in the plural: mol, mole "much, many"; poj, poje "little, few"; tal, tale "every, all"; ek, eke "some, a few".

=== Pronouns ===
Personal pronouns have three cases: nominative, accusative (also used with all prepositions) and dative. Possessive adjectives are used for the genitive. As in English, there are three pronouns in the third person singular (masculine: he; feminine: ce; neuter: je"") as well as a reflexive pronoun. For example: i "I" (nominative), ma "me" (accusative), mo "to me" (dative); tu, ta, to "you", etc.

The complete set of personal pronouns:

| | singular | plural |
| first person | i "I" | nu "we" |
| second person | tu "you (sg.)" | vu "you" (used both as plural and as polite form) |
| third person masc. | he "he" | lu "they" |
| third person fem. | ce "she" | lu "they" |
| third person neuter | je "it" | lu "they" |

Reflexive pronoun: sia "oneself".

=== Verbs ===
Uropi verbs have indicative, imperative and conditional moods, as well as a simple form, a durative (continuous) form and a perfect form.

- Except in the imperative, the verbal form remains the same whatever the person.
- The infinitive ending is -o: jedo "to eat", sopo "to sleep", avo "to have".
- The form of the simple present is that of the radical: i jed "I eat", tu sop "you sleep".
- The simple past is formed by adding a stressed -ì: i jedì "I ate", he avì "he had".
- To form the future you use the particle ve with the infinitive: i ve jedo "I'll eat"; ve tu sopo? "will you sleep?"; lu v'ne veno "they won't come".
- The conditional is formed by adding -ev to the stem: Is i sev fami, i jedev "If I was (lit. would be) hungry, I would eat".
- The perfect uses the auxiliary avo "to have" and the past participle ending in -en: i av jeden "I have eaten"; ce av venen "she has come".
- The durative (continuous) form uses the auxiliary so "to be" and the present participle, ending in -an: i se jedan "I'm eating", se he sopan? "is he sleeping?"
- The imperative: jed, jede, jedem "eat!" (singular/plural), "let's eat!"
- The passive uses the auxiliary vido "to get, to become" and the past participle: De mus vid jeden pa de kat "The mouse is eaten by the cat".

=== Numbers ===
| Numeral | Cardinal | Ordinal |
|---|---|---|
| 1 | un | pri |
| 2 | du | duj |
| 3 | tri | trij |
| 4 | kwer | kweri |
| 5 | pin | pini |
| 6 | ses | |
| 7 | sep | |
| 8 | oc | |
| 9 | nev | |
| 10 | des | |
| 100 | sunte | |
| 357 | trisunte pindes-sep | |
| 1000 | tilie | |

Ordinal numbers are formed by adding -i or -j (after a vowel): duj: "second"; trij: "third", kweri: "fourth", pini: "fifth"; the exception is pri: "first".

Fractions are formed by adding -t to numbers: u trit "a third", u kwert "a fourth, a quarter"; the exception is mij "half".

== Example ==
A Child's Thought

At seven, when I go to bed,
I find such pictures in my head:
Castles with dragons prowling round,
Gardens where magic fruits are found;
Fair ladies prisoned in a tower,
Or lost in an enchanted bower;
While gallant horsemen ride by streams
That border all this land of dreams
I find, so clearly in my head
At seven, when I go to bed.
At seven, when I wake again,
The magic land I seek in vain;
A chair stands where the castle frowned,
The carpet hides the garden ground,
No fairies trip across the floor,
Boots, and not horsemen, flank the door,
And where the blue streams rippling ran
Is now a bath and water-can;
I seek the magic land in vain
At seven, when I wake again.

— "A Child's Thought", by Robert Louis Stevenson
Translation:
U Men Kidi

Be sep, wan i it a led,
I find sul’ imaʒe in mi ment,
Ki dragone valgan aròn kastele,
Gardine wo un find maʒiki frute;
Lovi damas in u tor inkarsen,
O perlasen in u fost insaren;
Wo galan kwalore rait su ber rijis
We se de frontias da landi soinis.
I find ja, sa klarim in mi ment
Be sep, wan i it a led.
Be sep, revos ma vekan
De maʒiki land i cek in van;
U sel se stan za wo stì de kastèl,
De gardini bod wen u tapìz cel.
Nun feja se vadan tra de plor,
Bote, ne kwalore, se stan ner de dor,
Id wo de blu rije sì flujan ki rikle
Num u banar id vodikrùg je ste;
I cek de maʒiki land in van
Be sep, revos ma vekan.

== See also ==
- Swadesh lists for auxlang (ru)
