= Border Zone (video game) =

1987 video game

- Developer: Infocom
- Publisher: Infocom
- Designer: Marc Blank
- Engine: Z-machine
- Platforms: Apple II, Atari ST, Commodore 64, MS-DOS, Mac
- Release: October 8, 1987
- Genre: Interactive fiction
- Mode: Single player

Border Zone is an interactive fiction video game written by Marc Blank and published by Infocom in 1987. It was released for IBM PC compatibles, Apple II, Commodore 64, Atari ST, and Mac. Border Zone incorporates real-time elements into the gameplay. It is also Infocom's thirtieth game. Its tagline is "Action and international intrigue behind the Iron Curtain."

== Plot ==
Mirroring the real-world tension of the Cold War in the 1980s, Border Zone is set in and around Ostnitz, located on the border between the Eastern Bloc nation of Frobnia and neutral Litzenburg. The celebration of "Constitution Day" in Ostnitz will include a speech by Litzenburg's American ambassador; there is a plot in motion, however, to assassinate the ambassador in an effort to provoke hostilities between the superpowers. Border Zone consists of three chapters, each of which places the player in the role of a different character. An American businessman, a KGB agent, and an American spy become entangled in the assassination plot and efforts to either stop it or ensure its success.

The tension is increased by the introduction of real-time events in the game. Unusual for a text adventure, game time continues to pass even as the computer waits for the player's next input. Certain actions, such as sneaking past a guard post, must be timed carefully to succeed.

== Feelies ==
Besides the high quality of their interactive fiction games, Infocom was also known for feelies: extra items included in each game package related to the story, and sometimes used as copy protection. The Border Zone feelies included:

- I Am Frobnia, a "Fortunate Tourists Guide and Phrasebook"
- A business card from "Riznik's Antiques, Rare Books and Curios" (In Historic Ostnitz for 35 Years)
- A matchbook with the logo of the Frobnia National Railway (Frobniz Bourashni Rallni)
- A map of the border between Frobnia and Litzenburg

== Reception ==
Computer Gaming World's Scorpia found Border Zone's division into three standalone adventures unsatisfying, and stated that it would have been better as one. She concluded that it was "one of Infocom's weakest games to date". PC Magazine stated that the game "has hit upon exactly the right scenario for an interactive novel" and praised the feelies' "rich detail". Compute! also praised the feelies, and stated that the real-time game play and playing three different characters distinguished the game from other text adventures.
