= Bzzzpeek =

Children's website

Bzzzpeek.com is a website designed to appeal to young children that focuses on onomatopoeia from around the world. The site comprises recordings contributed by native speakers who imitate familiar sounds, such as animal calls and vehicle noises as they are typically rendered in their own language.

== History and description ==
The website was created in 2002 by French-born Agathe Jacquillat and Germany-born Austrian Tomi Vollauschek of design studio FL@33. The website name is a composite of the sound of a bee as made in French (bzzz) and an onomatopoeiac representation of piquer, the French verb to sting.

The online collection focuses on the pronunciation and comparison of familiar sounds by presenting a range of animals and other objects as icons. When you select one, multiple images bearing different national flags are shown side by side so that the similarities and variations between languages can be heard by highlighting each one. Currently more than 20 countries are represented on the website and anyone can contribute their own sound recordings to add to the archive. Many of the contributors are young children and the site is designed to be navigated largely through images rather than words.

=== Awards and exhibitions ===
In 2003, the website received an honorary mention at the Prix Ars Electronica competition. It has also received a Distinctive Merit Award from the Art Directors Club of New York.

In 2011, the project was selected for inclusion in an exhibition entitled Talk to Me: Design and the Communication between People and Objects at New York's Museum of Modern Art (MoMA).

== See also ==
- List of animal sounds
