= Keystone Air Service =

Airline in Manitoba, Canada

Keystone Air Service Ltd
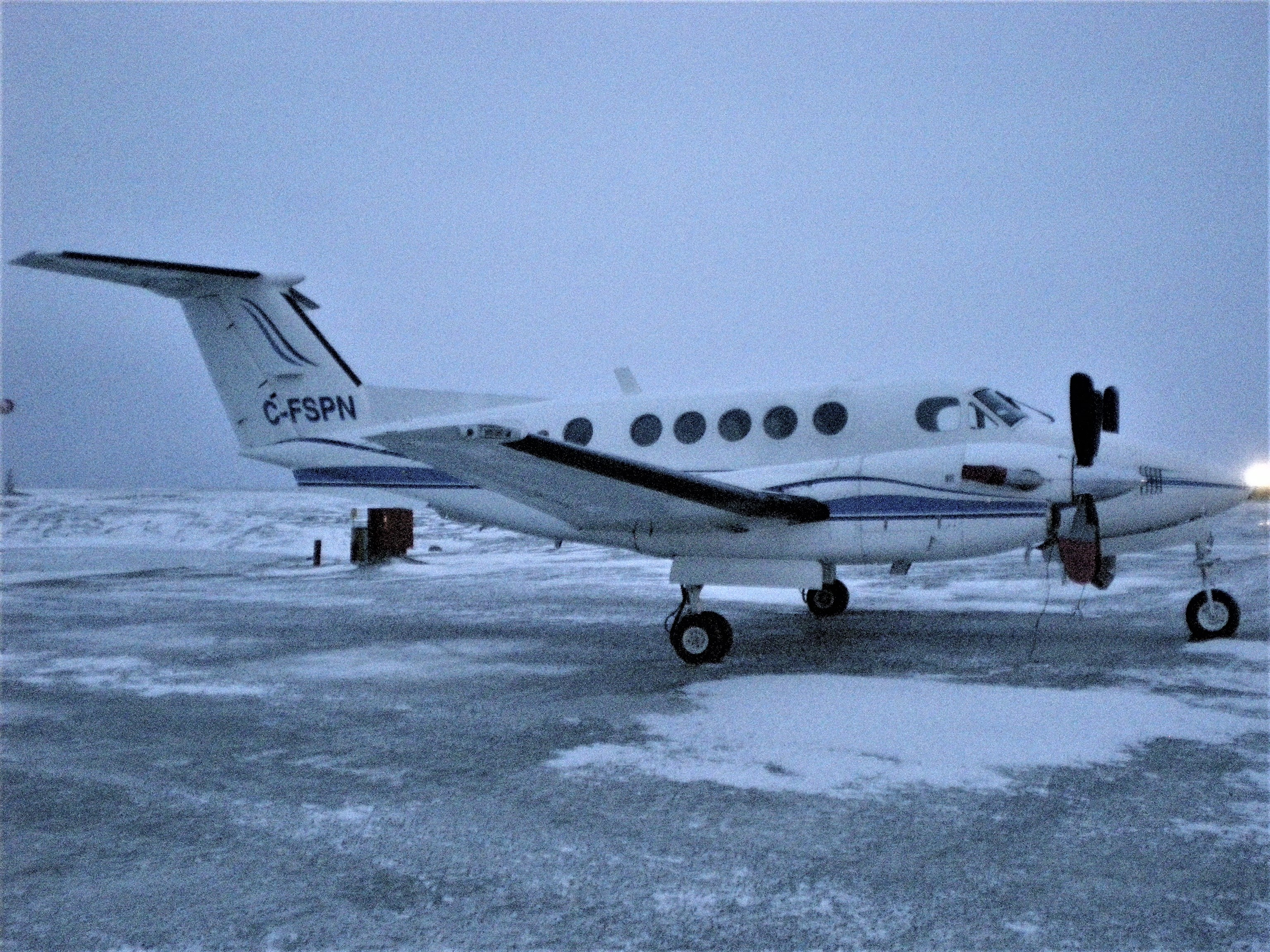
- Keystone Air Service Beech 200
IATA	ICAO	Call sign
-	KEE	KEYSTONE
- Founded: 1985
- Ceased operations: 2015
- Hubs: Winnipeg/St. Andrews Airport
- Focus cities: Rural Municipality of St. Andrews; Winnipeg
- Fleet size: 6
- Destinations: Anywhere in North America
- Headquarters: Winnipeg, Manitoba
- Key people: Cliff Arlt - President

Keystone Air Service Ltd. was an airline that served Manitoba, Canada, with charter services to anywhere in North America. Keystone had been flying since 1985 and provided air charter service to as far north as Alert, Nunavut. In 2015 merged into Wings over Kississing.

== Fleet ==
The Keystone Air Service fleet included:

Aircraft	Variant	Count	Passengers
Beechcraft Super King Air	200	3	12 (8 in executive)
Piper PA-31	Chieftain	1	9
Piper PA-31	Navajo	1	7
Beechcraft Model 99	B99	1	14

== Incidents and accidents ==
- On 15 September 2015, a Piper PA-31 Navajo with two crew and six passengers crashed 2 kilometres (1.2 mi) from Thompson, Manitoba airport shortly after takeoff. All eight people were transported to hospital. The crash was caused by the refueller mistakenly filling the plane with jet fuel, instead of the required avgas.
- In 2012, a Piper PA-31 carrying five passengers stalled on final approach and crashed near North Spirit Lake First Nation, Ontario due to adverse weather and icing conditions. The aircraft was destroyed and four passengers (including the pilot) were killed, while one passenger sustained serious injuries.
- In 2002, a Piper PA-31-350 ran out of fuel and crashed at an intersection in Winnipeg, Manitoba after a missed approach to Winnipeg James Armstrong Richardson International Airport runway 36. All seven passengers and several occupants in a vehicle on the ground were injured in the crash, and one passenger subsequently died from injuries.

== See also ==
- List of defunct airlines of Canada
