= Comparison between Esperanto and Ido =

Comparison of related international auxiliary languages

Esperanto and Ido are constructed international auxiliary languages, with Ido being an Esperantido derived from Esperanto and Reformed Esperanto. The number of speakers is estimated at 100 thousand to 2 million for Esperanto, whereas Ido is much fewer at 100 to 1 thousand.

Esperanto was developed by L. L. Zamenhof, who published it in 1887 under the pseudonym Dr Esperanto. It immediately became popular, but soon the members of the movements were making suggestions as to how they thought it might be improved. Zamenhof responded by making a list of possible changes to Esperanto and in 1894 put them before the Esperanto community. If accepted they would create what Dr Zamenhof called a "Reformed Esperanto". This proposed reformed Esperanto is sometimes referred to as Esperanto 1894. However, when the Esperanto community was invited to vote on whether to adopt the proposals, they rejected the proposals by a large majority.

Ido was created around a quarter of a century after Esperanto. The name Ido means "offspring" in Esperanto and was so named by its creators because it was a development of Esperanto. The creation of Ido led to a schism between those who believed that Esperanto should be left as it was and those who believed that it had what they perceived as inherent flaws which made it not quite good enough to be the world's international auxiliary language. Those who opposed change maintained that it was endless tinkering that had led, in their opinion, to the decline of Volapük, a once popular constructed language that had predated Esperanto's publication by a few years. They also cited the rejection of Zamenhof's 1894 reform proposals.

The languages of Esperanto and Ido remain close, and largely mutually intelligible, like two dialects of the same language. Just as dialects of a language are quite often sources of new words for that language through literature, so Ido has contributed many neologisms to Esperanto (especially in poetic substitutes for long words using the mal- prefix).

== Summary of differences ==
Aspect	Esperanto	Ido	Example
Alphabet	uses diacritics (ĉ, ĝ, ĥ, ĵ, ŝ, ŭ) and a digraph (dz)	uses digraphs (ch, sh, qu)	Translation of chamber, shoe and square: ĉambro / ŝuo / kvadrato (Esp.) chambro / shuo / quadrato (Ido)
Gender	Originally: masculine by default; feminine optional More recently, also: gender-neutral by default; feminine optional	gender-neutral by default; masculine and feminine optional	Gender of "elephant": elefanto (default [or masc.]) / elefantino (fem.) (Esp.) elefanto (default) / elefantulo (masc.) / elefantino (fem.) (Ido)
Antonyms	formed by mal- prefix	come from natural vocabulary can be formed by des- prefix	Translation of "warm" and "cold": varma / malvarma (Esp.) varma / kolda (Ido)
Infinitives	-i suffix	-ir (past) -ar (present) -or (future) suffixes	Translation of "to go": iri (Esp.) irar (Ido)
Imperative	-u suffix	-ez suffix	Translation of "go!": iru! (Esp.) irez! (Ido)
Plural noun	-oj suffix (agglutinative)	-i suffix (synthetic)	Plural of "house" (domo): domoj (Esp.) domi (Ido)
Adjectives	Agree with nouns	Unchanged	Translation of "big dogs": grandaj hundoj (Esp.) granda hundi (Ido)
Accusative form (-n)	Mandatory	Only when object precedes subject	Translation of "I drink milk" / "I milk drink" / "Milk I drink": "mi trinkas lakton" / "mi lakton trinkas" / "lakton mi trinkas" (Esp.) "me drinkas lakto" / "me lakto drinkas" / "lakton me drinkas" (Ido) i.e., SVO / SOV / OSV
Proper nouns	Sometimes altered	Not altered	Translation of "Europe": Eŭropo (Esp.); Europa (Ido)
No. of speakers	c. 100,000–2,000,000	c. 1,000–5,000	

== History ==
Calls for specific reforms to Esperanto were made almost from the beginning, and so Dr. L. L. Zamenhof published suggestions for reform in 1894. Publication took the form of a series of four articles (including a list of words singled out for possible change) in La Esperantisto monthly magazine, under the title Pri Reformoj en Esperanto. It was put to the vote whether this should be implemented in full or in part, or reworked or rejected. A big majority voted to reject it outright. Because so many voted no Zamenhof took no further interest in changing Esperanto and concentrated instead on the work of Fundamenta Esperanto.

In 1900 Louis Couturat, a French mathematician, after initial correspondence with Zamenhof created the Delegation for the Adoption of an International Auxiliary Language. The Delegation approached the International Association of Academies, based in Vienna, in 1907, requesting it to choose between the many artificial languages. This request was denied. The Delegation's response was to meet later that year (1907) in Paris as a committee under the chairmanship of Louis Couturat with the intention of deciding the issue themselves.

One of the languages under consideration was, of course, Esperanto. Zamenhof did not give permission to reprint his articles detailing his "Esperanto 1894" suggestions but a reprint was made and circulated, perhaps predisposing Committee members to think in terms of a reformed Esperanto. (There were 200 copies, distributed personally.) The Committee began its deliberations to choose an international auxiliary language from among the several entries. Most Esperantists assumed Esperanto would win easily. However, an anonymous entry was submitted at the last moment (against the rules) detailing a reformed version of Esperanto. Louis Couturat as chairman demanded the Committee finalize its business within a month, and only five members were involved in making the final decision. Of the five, one abstained and four voted for Esperanto but said it must be reformed. It later was discovered that the anonymous last-minute entrant was Louis de Beaufront, previously the chairman of the French Esperanto movement and chosen by Zamenhof himself to present the case for Esperanto.

Zamenhof refused to be involved in making changes to Esperanto but a group led by Louis Couturat elaborated on Ido as a "Reformed Esperanto". Louis Couturat polemicised against Esperanto until his early death in a car crash in 1914. His loss was a great setback to the spread of Ido.

Not everyone involved in creating Ido was satisfied with it; many former Idists, such as Otto Jespersen (who created Novial) left the movement, bleeding Ido of leaders.

Of all synthetic auxiliary languages, only Esperanto and Latino sine flexione gained a sizeable following and textual corpus to this day.

Esperanto is based on the Fundamento de Esperanto by L. L. Zamenhof; whereas the grammar of Ido is explained in the Kompleta Gramatiko Detaloza di la Linguo Internaciona Ido.

=== Modern situation and influence of Ido in Esperanto ===
Since Esperanto has proved to be a living, stable language, nowadays Esperantists are less quick to reject influences from Ido. Probably the most fundamental of these is that Esperantists have copied Idists in clarifying the rules for word derivation. In addition, modern Esperanto has borrowed the suffixes -oz- (meaning "abundant in") and -end- (meaning "required to") from Ido.

Especially poets have used the Ido equivalents of Esperanto's "mal-" word class ("Contrary of").

=== Proposals for a common gender in Esperanto ===
One difference between the two languages is that Ido has an extra common third person singular pronoun, i.e. that means "he or she". For various reasons, this is seen as desirable in Esperanto too by many Esperantists.

Some Esperantists have suggested ri as a replacement for all singular 3rd person pronouns. The suggested innovation is called riismo, but the total replacement of li, ŝi and ĝi is seen as too radical. When used as a simple addition to existing pronouns, Riismo has phonetic problems ("l" and "r" are pronounced by native speakers of Mandarin or Japanese in such a way that it can be hard to distinguish them – a fact that made Rev. Schleyer omit the "r" from Volapük – and this is especially so if the two words differentiating are li and ri).

In 1967, however, Manuel Halvelik already included the additional common egui/gi in Arcaicam Esperantom (keeping li as masculine pronoun), thus inadvertently founding giismo.

The third possibility, to keep the common-like aspect of li and introduce a new masculine pronoun (e.g. hi), is the proposal of the attempts of the hiismo-class.

=== Modern view of Esperantists towards proposed changes ===
The present day attitude is shown by the Esperanto Encyclopedia where it states that reforms, i.e. changing the fundaments of a language, have never been successful neither in Esperanto nor anywhere else, while evolution through use "enriches languages".

== Alphabet ==
Alphabets
Esperanto	a	b	c	ĉ	d	e	f	g	ĝ	h	ĥ	i	j	ĵ	k	l	m	n	o	p	kv	r	s	ŝ	t	u	ŭ	v	-	-	z
Esperanto 1894	a	b	z	-	d	e	f	g	-	h	-	i	j	-	k	l	m	n	o	p	kv	r	s	c	t	u	-	v	-	-	-
Ido	a	b	c	ch	d	e	f	g	-	h	-	i	y	j	k	l	m	n	o	p	qu	r	s	sh	t	u	-	v	w	x	z
IPA phonemes	a	b	t͡s	t͡ʃ	d	e	f	g	d͡ʒ	h	/x/	i	j	ʒ	k	l	m	n	o	p	/kw/,/kv/	r	s	ʃ	t	u	u̯ (in diphthongs)	v	w	/ks/,/ɡz/	z

== Phonology ==
Ido omits two consonants used in Esperanto, /x/ and /d͡ʒ/, opting to use the similar sounds /h/ and /ʒ/ exclusively.

Esperanto omitted sounds	Ido similar sounds
ĥ	h
ĝ	j

Ido's rule for determining stress is regular, but slightly more complex than Esperanto's. In Esperanto, all words are stressed on the penultimate, second-to-last syllable: radio, televido. In Ido all polysyllables are stressed on the second-to-last syllable except for verb infinitives, which are stressed on the last syllable. If an i or u precedes another vowel, the pair is considered part of the same syllable when applying the accent rule, unless the two vowels are the only ones in the word, in which case the "i" or "u" is stressed.

Stress	Ido	English	Esperanto
Regular:	skolo, kafeo, lernas	"school", "coffee" and the present tense of "to learn"	lernejo, kafo, lernas
Verb infinitives:	irar, savar and drinkar	"to go", "to know" and "to drink"	iri, scii, trinki
Preceding i or u:	radio, familio and manuo	"radio", "family" and "hand"	radio, familio, manuo
Preceding i or u (with only two vowels)	dio, frua	"day" and "early"	tago, frue

== Orthography ==
Esperanto eliminates the letters ‹q›, ‹w›, ‹x›, and ‹y› from the 26-letter Latin alphabet and adds the new letters ‹ĉ›, ‹ĝ›, ‹ĥ›, ‹ĵ›, ‹ŝ› and ‹ŭ›. Ido uses the 26-letter alphabet without changes, substituting digraphs for Esperanto's diacritics. While words in both Ido and Esperanto are spelled exactly as they are pronounced, the presence of digraphs means that Ido does not have the one-to-one correspondence between letters and sounds that Esperanto has. However, Ido's digraphs are more recognizable to speakers of Romance languages and its avoidance of diacritics guarantees that any computer system that supports English could easily be used for Ido.

The Fundamento de Esperanto does allow the use of the digraphs ‹ch›, ‹gh›, ‹hh›, ‹jh›, ‹sh› and the single letter ‹u› instead of the ordinary diacritical letters of Esperanto when those are unavailable. With the advent of computers, another system of surrogate Esperanto writing using ‹cx›, ‹gx›, ‹hx›, ‹jx›, ‹sx› and ‹ux› was introduced. It however remains unofficial.

In general, the letter ⟨ĥ⟩ ([x]) in Esperanto becomes h or k in Ido. The letters ĝ and ĵ are merged into j (which has the sound of "s" in "leisure") while ĉ, ŝ, ŭ, ks/kz, and kv respectively become ch, sh, w, x, and qu.

== Morphology ==
Both in Ido and in Esperanto, each word is built from a root word. A word consists of a root and a grammatical ending. Other words can be formed from that word by removing the grammatical ending and adding a new one, or by inserting certain affixes between the root and the grammatical ending.

Some of the grammatical endings of the two languages are defined as follows:

Grammatical form	Esperanto		Ido	English	
Singular noun	-o (libro)		-o (libro)	book	
Plural noun	-oj (libroj)		-i (libri)	books	
Adjective	-a (varma)		-a (varma)	warm	
Adverb	-e (varme)		-e (varme)	warmly	
Present tense infinitive	-anti (iranti)	-i (iri)	-ar (irar)	to be going	to go
Past tense infinitive	-inti (irinti)	-i (iri)	-ir (irir)	to have gone	to go
Future tense infinitive	-onti (ironti)	-i (iri)	-or (iror)	to be going to go	to go
Present	-as (iras)		-as (iras)	go, goes	
Past	-is (iris)		-is (iris)	went	
Future	-os (iros)		-os (iros)	will go	
Imperative	-u (iru)		-ez (irez)	go!	
Conditional	-us (irus)		-us (irus)	would go	

Most of these endings are the same as in Esperanto except for -i, -ir, -ar, -or and -ez. Esperanto marks noun plurals by an agglutinative ending -j (so plural nouns end in -oj), uses -i for verb infinitives (Esperanto infinitives are tenseless), and uses -u for the imperative. Verbs in both Esperanto and Ido do not conjugate depending on person, number or gender; the -as, -is, and -os endings suffice whether the subject is I, you, he, she, they, or anything else.

Both languages have the same grammatical rules concerning nouns (ending with -o), adjectives (ending with -a) and many other aspects. (However, the relationship between nouns, verbs and adjectives underwent a number of changes with Ido, based on the principle of reversibility.) In both languages one can see a direct relationship between the words multa "many" and multo "a multitude" by simply replacing the adjectival -a with a nominal -o, or the other way around.

Some minor differences include the loss of adjectival agreement, and the change of the plural from an agglutinative -j tacked onto the end to a synthetic replacement of the terminal -o with an -i. Hence, Esperanto belaj hundoj ("beautiful dogs") becomes Ido bela hundi. Ido also does away with the direct object ending -n in sentences where the subject precedes the object, so Esperanto mi amas la belajn hundojn ("I love the beautiful dogs") would in Ido become me amas la bela hundi.

Greater differences arise, however, with the derivations of many words. For example, in Esperanto, the noun krono means "a crown", and by replacing the nominal o with a verbal i one derives the verb kroni "to crown". However, if one were to begin with the verb kroni, "to crown", and replace the verbal i with a nominal o to create a noun, the resulting meaning would not be "a coronation", but rather the original "crown". This is because the root kron- is inherently a noun: With the nominal ending -o the word simply means the thing itself, whereas with the verbal -i it means an action performed with the thing. To get the name for the performance of the action, it is necessary to use the suffix -ado, which retains the verbal idea. Thus it is necessary to know which part of speech each Esperanto root belongs to.

Ido introduced a number of suffixes in an attempt to clarify the morphology of a given word, so that the part of speech of the root would not need to be memorized. In the case of the word krono "a crown", the suffix -izar "to cover with" is added to create the verb kronizar "to crown". From this verb it is possible to remove the verbal -ar and replace it with a nominal -o, creating the word kronizo "a coronation". By not allowing a noun to be used directly as a verb, as in Esperanto, Ido verbal roots can be recognized without the need to memorize them.

== Syntax ==
Ido word order is generally the same as Esperanto (subject–verb–object). The Ido sentence Me havas la blua libro ("I have the blue book") is the same as the Esperanto Mi havas la bluan libron, both in meaning and word order. There are a few differences, however:

- In both Esperanto and Ido, adjectives can precede the noun as in English, or follow the noun as in Spanish. Thus, in Ido, Me havas la libro blua means the same thing.
- Ido has the accusative suffix -n, but unlike Esperanto, this suffix is only required when the object of the sentence is not clear, for example, when the subject-verb-object word order is not followed. Thus, the Ido sentence La blua libron me havas also means the same thing.

Unlike Esperanto, Ido does not impose rules of grammatical agreement between grammatical categories within a sentence. Adjectives do not have to be pluralized: in Ido the large books would be la granda libri as opposed to la grandaj libroj in Esperanto.

== Vocabulary ==
Although Esperanto and Ido share a large amount of vocabulary, there are differences. The creators of Ido felt that much of Esperanto was either not internationally recognizable, or unnecessarily deformed, and aimed to fix these with more "international" or "corrected" roots. This reform can sometimes be at the expense of Esperanto's simpler word-building process. Below are some examples in Esperanto, Ido and English; with French, German, Italian, Spanish and Portuguese for linguistic comparison:*

Esperanto	Ido	English	German	French	Italian	Spanish	Portuguese
bubalo (cf. international bubalus)	bufalo	buffalo	Büffel	buffle	bufalo	búfalo	búfalo
ĉelo	celulo	cell	Zelle	cellule	cellula	célula	célula
ĉirkaŭ	cirkum	around/circa	ungefähr/circa	autour de	circa	alrededor, cerca	ao redor de, em volta de
dediĉi	dedikar	to dedicate	widmen	dédier	dedicare	dedicar	dedicar
edzo	spoz(ul)o	husband/spouse	Ehemann	époux	sposo	esposo	esposo/marido
elasta	elastika	elastic	elastisch	élastique	elastico	elástico	elástico
estonteco	futuro	future	Zukunft	futur	futuro	futuro	futuro
kaj	e(d)	and	und	et	e(d)	y/e	e
lernejo ("learning place")	skolo	school	Schule	école	scuola	escuela	escola
limo	limito	limit	Limit	limite	limite	límite	limite
maĉi	mastikar	to chew/masticate	kauen	mâcher	masticare	masticar	mastigar
mencii	mencionar	to mention	erwähnen	mentionner	menzionare	mencionar	mencionar
nacio	naciono	nation	Nation	nation	nazione	nación	nação
penti	repentar	to repent	bereuen	repentir	pentirsi	arrepentirse	arrepender-se
ŝipo	navo	boat/ship	Schiff	bateau/navire	barca/nave	barco/nave/navío	bote/barca/barco/nave/nau/navio
taĉmento	detachmento	detachment	Abteilung	détachement	distaccamento	destacamento	destacamento
vipuro	vipero	viper	Viper	vipère	vipera	víbora	víbora

* Note that Spanish, Portuguese, Italian, and French are Romance languages, while German and English are Germanic languages. English has also had large influences from French and Latin.
In comparison, Esperanto is somewhat more influenced by German vocabulary and Slavic semantics (as in the case of prefix mal-), and has more priority over word compounding by affixes.

=== Gender ===
Another part of the reform is that Ido, unlike Esperanto, does not assume the male gender in roots such as for family. For example, Ido does not derive the word for waitress by adding a feminine suffix to waiter, as Esperanto does to derive it from neutral to only feminine. Instead, Ido words are defined as gender neutral, and two different suffixes derive masculine and feminine words from the root: servisto for a waiter of any gender, servistulo for a male waiter, and servistino for a waitress. There are only two exceptions to this rule: First, patro for father, matro for mother, and genitoro for parent, and second, viro for man, muliero for woman, and adulto for adult.

Most Esperanto words are gender-neutral ("table", "grass", etc.). However, Esperanto assumes the male gender by default in other words, mainly words dealing with familial relationships and some animals. These words can be made female with the use of the feminine suffix. In Ido there is no default gender for normal root words, and one simply adds the corresponding masculine or feminine suffix only when desired. For example, frato means "brother" in Esperanto, but "sibling" in Ido. Ido uses the suffixes -ino ("female", used as in Esperanto) and -ulo ("male", not to be confused with the same Esperanto suffix which means "person"). Thus "sister" is fratino (the same as Esperanto), but brother is fratulo. "Sibling" and other gender neutral forms are especially difficult in Esperanto since Esperanto simply does not have a word for such gender neutral forms. Esperanto does, however, have an epicene prefix that indicates "both sexes together": ge-. Patro means "father" and patrino "mother"; gepatroj means "parents". In standard usage gepatro cannot be used in the singular to indicate a parent of unknown gender; one would say instead unu el la gepatroj, "one (out) of the parents".

There is a nonstandard suffix in Esperanto that means "male": -iĉo (see Gender reform in Esperanto). There is also an existing prefix, vir-, with the same meaning, used for animals.

A few exceptions exist in Ido's gender system as described above, which avoid its suffix system, for which it was decided that the feminine words were so much more recognizable to its source languages: viro ("man"), muliero ("woman"), patro ("father"), and matro ("mother"). Compare these with Esperanto viro, virino, patro, and patrino, respectively. Ido also has several other neutral-gender words, such as genitoro for "parent". Gepatri in Ido means the same as Esperanto gepatroj (i.e. "parents" of both genders); genitori means "parents" in the English sense, not making any implication of gender whatsoever.

Other words, such as amiko ("friend"), are neutral in Esperanto as well as Ido.

=== Unasenceso ===
Another principle of Ido is Unasenceso or "one sensedness." This means each Ido root is supposed to correspond to only one meaning. Ido proponents feel that this allows for more precise expression than in Esperanto.

=== Mal- ===
Ido claims the prefix mal- (creating a word with the exact opposite meaning) in Esperanto to be overused as a prefix, and also to be inappropriate since it has negative meanings in many languages, and introduces des- as an alternative in such cases. Ido also uses a series of opposite words in lieu of a prefix. For example, instead of malbona ("bad", the opposite of bona, "good"), Ido uses mala, or instead of mallonga ("short", the opposite of longa, "long"), kurta. Listening comprehension was also given as a reason: the primary Ido grammar book states that one reason for the adoption of the Latin-based sinistra for "left" instead of maldextra (mal- plus the word dextra, or dekstra for "right") is that often only the last one or two syllables can be heard when shouting commands. Esperanto has developed alternate forms for many of these words (such as liva for maldekstra), but most of these are rarely used.

An extreme example of overuse of the mal- suffix.

Esperanto	La malbela maljunulino mallaŭte malfermis la pordon al sia kelo kaj malrapide malsupreniris la ŝtuparon.
Ido	La leda olda muliero silence apertis la pordo di lua kelero e lente decensis per l'eskalero.
English	The ugly old woman quietly opened the door to her basement and slowly descended the stairs.

=== Correlatives ===
Esperanto adopts a regular scheme of correlatives organized as a table. Ido combines words together and changing word endings with some irregularities to show distinction, which is not as regular as that of Esperanto but is easier to distinguish by ear.

			Relative and interrogative		Demonstrative		Indeterminate		Most Indeterminate	Negative		Collective	
			Esperanto	Ido	Esperanto	Ido	Esperanto	Ido	Ido	Esperanto	Ido	Esperanto	Ido
			ki-	qua, ∅	ti-	ita, ∅	i-	ula, ∅	irga	neni-	nula	ĉi-	omna
Individual	Esperanto	-u	kiu		tiu		iu			neniu		ĉiu	
Individual	Ido	-u	qua		ita		ulu		irgu	nulu		omnu	
Thing	Esperanto	-o	kio		tio		io			nenio		ĉio	
Thing	Ido	-o	quo		ito		ulo		irgo	nulo		omno	
Plural	Esperanto	-j	kiuj/kioj		tiuj/tioj		iuj/ioj			neniuj/nenioj		ĉiuj/ĉioj	
Plural	Ido	-i	qui		iti		uli		irgi	nuli		omni	
Motive	Esperanto	-al	kial		tial		ial			nenial		ĉial	
Motive	Ido	pro	pro quo		pro to		pro ulo		pro irgo	pro nulo		pro omno	
Association	Esperanto	-es	kies		ties		ies			nenies		ĉies	
Association	Ido	di	di quo		di to		di ulo		di irgo	di nulo		di omno	
Adjective	Ido	-a	qua		ita		ula		irga	nula		omna	
Place	Esperanto	-e	kie		tie		ie			nenie		ĉie	
Place	Ido	loke	ube, qualoke		ibe		ulaloke		irgaloke	nulaloke		omnaloke	
Time	Esperanto	-am	kiam		tiam		iam			neniam		ĉiam	
Time	Ido	tempe	kande		lore, (i)tatempe		ulatempe		irgatempe	nulatempe		omnatempe, sempre	
Quality	Esperanto	-a	kia		tia		ia			nenia		ĉia	
Quality	Ido	-a, speca	quala		tala		ulaspeca		irgaspeca	nulaspeca		omnaspeca	
Manner	Esperanto	-el	kiel		tiel		iel			neniel		ĉiel	
Manner	Ido	-e, maniere	quale		tale		ule, ulamaniere		irge, irgamaniere	nule, nulamaniere		omnamaniere	
Quantity – adjective	Esperanto	-om	kiom		tiom		iom			neniom		ĉiom	
Quantity – adjective	Ido	quanta	quanta		tanta		ulaquanta		irgaquanta	nulaquanta		omnaquanta	

==== Example ====
The Ido correlatives were changed so they would be more distinct sounding:

Esperanto	Prenu ĉiujn tiujn,* kiujn vi volos, kaj lasu ĉiujn tiujn,* kiuj ne plaĉos al vi.
Ido	Prenez ti omna, quin vu volos, e lasez ti omna, qui ne plezos a vu.
English	Take all those, which you want, and leave all those, which you don't like.

* Note: ĉiujn tiujn, kiuj(n) (all those, which) is more commonly said as ĉiujn, kiuj(n) (all, which) in Esperanto.

=== Pronouns ===
The pronouns of Ido were revised to make them more acoustically distinct than those of Esperanto, which all end in i. Especially the singular and plural first-person pronouns mi and ni may be difficult to distinguish in a noisy environment, so Ido has me and ni instead. Ido also distinguishes between intimate (tu) and formal (vu) second-person singular pronouns as well as plural second-person pronouns (vi) not marked for intimacy. Furthermore, Ido has a pan-gender third-person pronoun lu (it can mean "he", "she", or "it", depending on the context) in addition to its masculine (il), feminine (el), and neuter (ol) third-person pronouns.

Pronouns
	singular							plural							common
	first	second		third				first	second	third					common
	first	familiar	formal	masculine	feminine	neuter	common	first	second	masculine	feminine	neuter	common	reflexive	common
Esperanto	mi	ci	vi	li	ŝi	ĝi	li	ni	vi				ili	si	oni
Ido	me	tu	vu	il(u)	el(u)	ol(u)	lu	ni	vi	ili	eli	oli	li	su	on(u)
Esperanto 1894	mi/mu	tu	vu	lu	elu	lu	–	nos	vos				ilu	su	on
English	I	thou	you	he	she	it	–	we	you				they		one

Ido pronouns ili, eli, and oli, are translatable to Esperanto respectively, though not grammatically, as liaro, ŝiaro, and ĝiaro. Ol, like English it and Esperanto ĝi, is not limited to inanimate objects, but can be used "for entities whose sex is indeterminate: babies, children, humans, youths, elders, people, individuals, horses, cows, cats, etc."

As Esperanto was created in the Russian Empire, "ci"/"tu" in Esperanto and Esperanto 1894 are used / to be used only in very familiar circles and towards children and intellectually inferior creatures/humans; its use faced to a colleague or outside of the family can be seen as outright insulting. Therefore, "ci" is omitted in most basic grammars, as many Esperantists will use their native tongue in situations where "ci"/„tu" were appropriate.

=== Proper nouns ===
Esperanto may or may not "Esperantize" names and proper nouns, depending on many factors. Most standard European names have equivalents, as do many major cities and all nations. Ido, on the other hand, treats most proper nouns as foreign words, and does not render them into Ido.

==== Personal names ====
Many common cross-culture European names have Esperanto equivalents, such as Johano (John, Johann, Juan, Jean, etc.), Aleksandro (Alexander, Aleksandr, Alessandro, etc.), Mario or Maria (Mary, Maria, Marie, etc.), among others. Some Esperanto speakers choose to take on a fully assimilated name, or to at least adjust the orthography of their name to the Esperanto alphabet. Others leave their name completely unmodified. This is regarded as a personal choice, and the Academy of Esperanto officially affirmed this proclaiming that "everyone has the right to keep their authentic name in its original orthography, as long as it is written in Latin letters."

Personal names in Ido, on the other hand, are always left unmodified.

==== Place names ====
Most countries have their own names in Esperanto. The system of derivation, though, is sometimes complex. Where the country is named after an ethnic group, the main root means a person of that group: anglo is an Englishman, franco is a Frenchman. Originally, names of countries were created by the addition of the suffix -ujo ("container"), hence England and France would be rendered Anglujo and Francujo respectively (literally "container for Englishmen/Frenchmen"). More recently, many Esperantists have adopted -io as the national suffix, thus creating names more in line with standard international practice (and less odd-looking): Anglio, Francio, nevertheless the suffix remains unofficial.

In the New World, where citizens are named for their country, the name of the country is the main word, and its inhabitants are derived from that: Kanado ("Canada"), kanadano ("Canadian").

Names of cities may or may not have an Esperanto equivalent: Londono for London, Nov-Jorko for New York. Place names which lack widespread recognition, or which would be mangled beyond recognition, usually remain in their native form: Cannes is usually rendered as Cannes.

In Ido, continents have their own names: Europa, Amerika (divided in Nord-Amerika and Sud-Amerika), Azia, Afrika, Oceania and Antarktika.

In Ido, country names must conform to the language's orthography but otherwise many are left unchanged: Peru, Portugal, Chad. Many other countries have their names translated, as Germania for Germany, Chili for Chile, Usa for the United States or Chinia for China.

City names are treated as foreign words (London), except when part of the name itself is a regular noun or adjective: Nov-York (Nov for nova, or "new", but the place name York is not changed as in Esperanto "Nov-Jorko"). This is not a hard and fast rule, however, and New York is also acceptable, which is similar to writing Köln in English for the city of Cologne in Germany. South Carolina becomes Sud-Karolina, much in the same way that a river called the "Schwarz River" is not transcribed as the "Black River" in English even though schwarz is the German word for black. However, less well-known place names are generally left alone, so a small town by the name of "Battle River" for example would be written the same way, and not transcribed as "Batalio-rivero". This is because transcribing a little-known place name would make it nearly impossible to find in the original language.

== Studies ==
One study conducted with 20 college students at Columbia University circa 1933 suggests that Esperanto's system of correlative words is easier to learn than Ido's. Two other studies by the same researchers suggest no significant overall difference in difficulty of learning between Esperanto and Ido for educated American adults, but the sample sizes were again small: in the two tests combined, only 32 test subjects studied Ido. The researchers concluded that additional comparative studies of Esperanto and Ido are needed.

Esperanto and Ido were compared in studies at Columbia University circa 1933:

A question which has been of interest to us is the comparative ease of learning of various artificial languages. The above records are all for Esperanto. Unfortunately we have been able to test only two groups learning Ido. Our test material is available to anyone who wishes to obtain further results. Of our two groups one comprised only four volunteer college students. The other consisted of twenty-eight educated adults who studied Ido for twenty hours as paid subjects in an experiment. We present here the outcome of our study.

Before any study of Ido the initial test scores are higher [than Esperanto], but the gains are less except in one function—aural understanding.

The final scores are practically the same. They are the same in vocabulary, 71.9; in terms of the sum of the three other tests, we have final scores of 44.1 for Esperanto and 45.2 for Ido. These results are, it must be remembered, for a limited number of subjects of able intellect who were working under more or less favorable conditions. Further experimentation, however, will probably bear out our conclusion that there is no great difference in difficulty in the learning of these two particular synthetic languages.

— International Auxiliary Language Association, 1933

== Number of speakers ==
Esperanto is estimated to have approximately 100,000 to 2 million fluent speakers. In the same manner estimates for the number of Ido speakers are far from accurate, but a few thousand is most likely. It is also important to note the distinction between the number of speakers compared to the number of supporters; the two languages resemble each other enough that a few weeks of study will enable one to understand the other with little difficulty, and there are a number of people that have learned Ido out of curiosity but prefer to support the larger Esperanto movement and vice versa. The number of participants at the respective international conferences is also much different: Esperanto conferences average 2000 to 3000 participants every year whereas Ido conferences have around 10 participants each year. Each language also has a number of regional conferences during the year on a much less formal basis, and with smaller numbers.

== Samples ==
The Lord's Prayer:

Esperanto

Patro nia, kiu estas en la ĉielo,
Via nomo estu sanktigita.
Venu Via regno,
plenumiĝu Via volo,
kiel en la ĉielo, tiel ankaŭ sur la tero.
Nian panon ĉiutagan donu al ni hodiaŭ.
Kaj pardonu al ni niajn ŝuldojn,
kiel ankaŭ ni pardonas al niaj ŝuldantoj.
Kaj ne konduku nin en tenton,
sed liberigu nin de la malbono.

Ido

Patro nia qua esas en la cieli,
Vua nomo santigesez;
Vua regno arivez;
Vua volo esez obediata,
Quale en la cielo, anke (tale) sur la tero.
Nia singladi’ panon donez a ni cadie,
E remisez a ni nia debaji,
Quale anke ni remisas a nia debanti,
E ne duktez ni aden la tento,
Ma liberigez ni de lo mala.

Esperanto 1894

Patro nose, kvu esten in ciele,
Sankte estan tue nomo.
Venan reksito tue,
estan vulo tue,
kom in cielo, sik anku sur tero.
Pano nose omnudie donan al nos hodiu
e pardonan al nos debi nose,
kom nos anku pardonen al nose debenti;
ne kondukan nos versu tento,
sed liberigan nos de malbono.

English

Our Father in heaven,
hallowed be your name.
Your kingdom come,
your will be done,
on earth as it is in heaven.
Give us this day our daily bread,
and forgive us our debts,
as we also have forgiven our debtors.
And lead us not into temptation,
but deliver us from evil.

Universal Declaration of Human Rights, Article 1

Esperanto

Ĉiuj homoj estas denaske liberaj
kaj egalaj laŭ digno kaj rajtoj.
Ili posedas racion kaj konsciencon,
kaj devus konduti unu al alia en spirito de frateco.

Ido

Omna homi naskas libera ed egala
relate digneso e yuri. Li es dotita
per raciono e koncienco e devas agar
la una vers l'altra en spirito di frateso.

English

All human beings are born free and equal
in dignity and rights. They are endowed
with reason and conscience and should act
towards one another in a spirit of brotherhood.

== See also ==
- Volapuk
- Esperanto 1894
- Novial
- Interlingua
