= Comparison between Ido and Interlingua =

Comparison article between IALs

Ido and Interlingua are two constructed languages created in the 20th century, Ido circa 1910 and Interlingua circa 1940. Both have had some measure of success, but Interlingua has enjoyed greater diffusion and acceptance by public and private institutions—it is taught in many high schools and universities, for example. Ido was developed by a small committee from Reformed Esperanto, whereas Interlingua was developed from scratch by an American organization, the IALA.

Ido is what is called schematic (easier to learn for speakers of very different languages), whereas Interlingua is what is called naturalistic (easier to understand for speakers of related languages).

== Neutrality of vocabulary ==
While both languages have majority Latin and Romance words in their lexicons, Ido has a somewhat larger number of Germanic and Slavic words, so it could be suggested that Ido is more internationally neutral. Germanic and Slavic words in Interlingua are often Romanized. When Interlingua adopts foreign words, however, they frequently retain their original form. By comparison, almost all words in Ido take on characteristic Ido finals and orthographies, except that Ido proper names have a greater degree of flexibility than other Ido words.

Interlingua Romanization and Ido finals
English	German	Interlingua	Ido
blockade	Blockade	blocada	blokuso

Both languages make use of an objective procedure to identify international words for their lexicons. Interlingua's procedure identifies a prototype that is common to the various forms of a word in its source languages, and its control languages are selected to increase the internationality of its vocabulary. Since their vocabularies are very similar, it is likely that both languages possess an internationality that extends beyond the Western language families.

Wordforms can enter the vocabulary of Interlingua by derivation from a small number of roots and affixes. Speakers who are familiar with these roots and affixes can understand words developed from them, a feature that facilitates learning for speakers of any language background.

== Orthography ==
Both languages use the Latin alphabet, but Ido orthography is such that based on the spelling of a word, you can pronounce it unambiguously. This is largely true of Interlingua as well.

Ido	IPA	Interlingua
A, a	a	A, a
B, b	b	B, b
C, c	ts	C, c before e, i, or y
Ch, ch	tʃ	Ch, ch
D, d	d	D, d
E, e	e or ɛ	E, e
F, f	f	F, f; Ph, ph
G, g	g	G, g
H, h	h	H, h
I, i	i	I, i
J, j	ʒ	J, j
K, k	k	C,c; Ch,ch Q,q; K,k (Q,q almost always appears before U,u)
L, l	l	L, l
M, m	m	M, m
N, n	n	N, n
O, o	o or ɒ	O, o
P, p	p	P, p
Qu,qu	kw or kv	Qu, qu
R, r	r	R, r
S, s	s	S, s; optionally C, c before i, e, y
Sh, sh	ʃ	Ch, ch; Sh, sh (Sh, sh is rare)
T, t	t	T, t; Th, th
U, u	u	U, u
V, v	v	V, v
W, w; U, u (before a vowel)	w	U, u; W, w (W, w is rare)
X,x	ks or gz	X, x
Y, y; I, i (before a vowel)	j	I,i; Y, y
Z, z	z	Z, z; S, s

== Sample text ==
The Lord's Prayer
Ido version	Interlingua version	Latin version	English version (traditional)
Patro nia, qua esas en la cielo, tua nomo santigesez; tua regno advenez; tua volo facesez quale en la cielo, tale anke sur la tero. Donez a ni cadie l'omnadiala pano, e pardonez a ni nia ofensi, quale anke ni pardonas a nia ofensanti, e ne duktez ni aden la tento, ma liberigez ni del malajo. Amen.	Patre nostre, qui es in le celos, que tu nomine sia sanctificate; que tu regno veni; que tu voluntate sia facite como in le celo, etiam super le terra. Da nos hodie nostre pan quotidian, e pardona a nos nostre debitas como etiam nos los pardona a nostre debitores. E non induce nos in tentation, sed libera nos del mal. Amen.	Pater noster, qui es in cælis, sanctificetur nomen tuum. Adveniat regnum tuum. Fiat voluntas tua, sicut in cælo, et in terra. Panem nostrum quotidianum da nobis hodie, et dimitte nobis debita nostra, sicut et nos dimittimus debitoribus nostris. Et ne nos inducas in tentationem, sed libera nos a malo. Amen.	Our Father, who art in heaven, hallowed be thy name; thy kingdom come, thy will be done. on earth, as it is in heaven. Give us this day our daily bread; and forgive us our debts as we have forgiven our debtors. And lead us not into temptation, but deliver us from evil. Amen.
