= Euclidean rhythm =

Maximally even rhythm

The Euclidean rhythm in music was discovered by Godfried Toussaint in 2004 and is described in a 2005 paper "The Euclidean Algorithm Generates Traditional Musical Rhythms". The greatest common divisor of two numbers is used rhythmically giving the number of beats and silences, generating almost all of the most important world music rhythms, except some Indian talas. The beats in the resulting rhythms are as equidistant as possible; the same results can be obtained from the Bresenham algorithm.

== Summary of algorithm ==
In Toussaint's paper the task of distributing $k$ beats within $n$ time steps is considered. It is given that $k < n$, so there are fewer beats than steps. The question arises of how to distribute these beats such that they are as equidistant as possible. This is easy when $n$ is divisible by $k$—in this case we distribute the beats such that they are $n/k$ steps away from their neighbour. As an example, below is a euclidean rhythm for $n = 16$ and $k = 4$. These beats are 4 steps away from each other because $n/k = 16/4 = 4$.

[ x . . . x . . . x . . . x . . . ]

Here "x" represents a beat and "." represents a silence.

The problem becomes more complicated when $k$ does not divide $n$. In this case the formula $n/k$ doesn't produce an integer, so some beats must be slightly closer to one neighbour than the other. Because of this the beats are no longer perfectly equidistant. As an example, take the case when $n = 13$ and $k = 5$. A naive algorithm may place the beats like this:

[ x . x . x . . x . . x . . ]

Although the beats are technically distributed with ideal spacing between the beats—they are either two steps apart or three—we still have a problem where the beats are "clumped" at the start and spaced out at the end. A more concrete definition of "equidistant" might ask that these spacings ("x ." and "x . .") are also distributed evenly.

Toussaint's observation is that Euclid's algorithm can be used to systematically find a solution for any $k$ and $n$ that minimizes "clumping". Taking the previous example where $n = 13$ and $k = 5$ we perform Euclid's algorithm:

$$\begin{align}
& & n = 13,\ k = 5 \\
n &= q_0 k + r_0 \implies&q_0 = 2,\ r_0 = 3 \\
k &= q_1 r_0 + r_1 \implies&q_1 = 1,\ r_1 = 2 \\
r_0 &= q_2 r_1 + r_2 \implies&q_2 = 1,\ r_2 = 1 \\
r_1 &= q_3 r_2 + r_3 \implies&q_3 = 2,\ r_3 = 0 \\
\end{align}$$

Toussaint's algorithm first constructs the following rhythm.

[ x x x x x . . . . . . . . ]

Then, using the sequence $t = k, r_0, r_1, r_2, ...$ we iteratively take $t_n$ columns off the right of the sequence and place them at the bottom. Starting with $t_0 = k = 5$, we get

[ x x x x x . . .
  . . . . .       ]

Next is $t_1 = r_0 = 3$:

[ x x x x x
  . . . . .
  . . .     ]

Next is $t_2 = r_1 = 2$:

[ x x x
  . . .
  . . .
  x x
  . .   ]

The process stops here because $t_3 < 2$, i.e. there is only one column to move. The final beat pattern is read out from top to bottom, left to right:

[ x . . x . x . . x . x . . ]

== Examples of euclidean rhythms ==
rhythm	n	k	pattern	notable works
Rock beat	4	2	x.x.	
Cumbia	4	3	x.xx	
Four on the floor	4	4	xxxx	I Feel Love
	5	2	x.x..	Take Five
	7	4	x.x.x.x	Râčenica (Bulgarian folk dance)
Tresillo	8	3	x..x..x.	
Cinquillo	8	5	x.xx.xx.	
Ewe drumming (shifted)	12	7	x.xx.x.xx.x.	
Bossa nova (shifted)	16	5	x..x..x..x..x...	

== Other uses of Euclid's algorithm in music ==
In the 17th century Conrad Henfling writing to Leibniz about music theory and the tuning of musical instruments makes use of the Euclidean algorithm in his reasoning. Viggo Brun investigated the use of Euclidean Algorithm in terms of constructing scales up to 4 different size intervals. Erv Wilson explored both using ratios and scale steps of which Kraig Grady applied to rhythms within long meters.

== See also ==
- Algorithmic composition
- Polyrhythm
