= Delegation for the Adoption of an International Auxiliary Language =

Body of academics the world language in 1901

The Delegation for the Adoption of an International Auxiliary Language (French: Délégation pour l'adoption d'une langue auxiliaire internationale) was a body of academics convened in the early part of the 1900s (decade) to decide on the issue of which international auxiliary language should be chosen for international use. The ultimate decision of the committee charged by the Delegation was to adopt the Esperanto language, but with certain reforms. The result became a distinct language known as Ido.

== Creation ==
The Delegation was founded in 1901 by French academics Louis Couturat and Léopold Leau, who had noted the language difficulties arising among international bodies convening during the 1900 World's Fair in Paris. Working with European esperantists, they gathered support for the Delegation from professional societies, companies, and universities.

Among the chief aims of the Delegation were to select a language to be taught alongside "natural languages" and allow written and spoken communication in an international environment. Three conditions were laid out for the language to be chosen:

1. It must be capable of serving the needs of science, in addition to everyday life, commerce and general communication,
2. It must be able to be easily learned by all people of average education, and especially those of the civilized nations of Europe, and
3. It must not be a living language.

In June 1907, the Delegation convened and refused to decide the ultimate issue, but rather, at Couturat's insistence, created a committee to make the decision.

== The Committee ==
The Delegation Committee arranged to meet in Paris starting on the 15th of October 1907. Supporters of Esperanto, including its author L. L. Zamenhof, warned Couturat that the committee had no authority to impose an international language, but they had received assurances from Couturat that Esperanto would be chosen anyway. The members of the committee were:

- Manuel Barrios, President of the Peruvian Senate
- Jan Baudouin de Courtenay, Professor of Linguistics, University of St. Petersburg
- Émile Boirac, University of Dijon, author and Esperanto supporter known for the phrase déjà vu
- Charles Jacques Bouchard, Professor, Paris College of Medicine
- Loránd Eötvös, Hungarian Academy of Sciences
- Wilhelm Förster, President of the International Committee for Weights and Measures
- Col. George Harvey, Esperanto supporter and editor of the North American Review
- Otto Jespersen, philologist, University of Copenhagen
- Spyridon Lambros, University of Athens
- Constantin Le Paige, University of Liege
- Wilhelm Ostwald, University of Leipzig, future Nobel Prize winner (chemistry)
- Hugo Schuchardt, University of Graz.

The committee heard from representatives of language projects, including Italian mathematician Giuseppe Peano in support of his own Latino sine flexione. Esperanto was represented by Louis de Beaufront, an active supporter of the language. Other languages, such as Bolak, Spokil and Idiom Neutral received the attention of the committee.

Towards the end of the committee's meeting, committee members received a proposal by an anonymous author identified as "Ido" (I.D. in Esperanto, possibly for Internacia Delegacio International Delegation, but also meaning "offspring" in Esperanto). The proposal reformed Esperanto in a number of ways, including removing circumflexed letters, dropping the mandatory accusative ending and reforming the plural. The reforms were endorsed by Esperanto's representative, de Beaufront.

The decision of the committee was to adopt Esperanto in principle, but with the reforms spelled out by Ido. A permanent commission was set up to see the implementation of the reforms. The anonymous "Ido", author of the reform project, was later revealed to be Louis de Beaufront, acting in concert with Louis Couturat.

== Aftermath ==
The commission delivered an ultimatum to the Esperanto Language Committee, the nearest approximate to a governing body of the Esperanto movement at the time. A response was demanded in one month, but this was logistically impossible as members of the Language Committee spread out all over Europe and beyond. After a month passed with no response, the commission broke relations with the Esperantists.

A number of Esperantists did migrate to the movement, including a number of influential leaders of the movement, but most ordinary speakers did not support the Ido reforms. This prompted the observation from outsiders that the Idists were generals without an army, and the Esperantists were an army with no generals. Less than a year later, the Universala Esperanto-Asocio was created to provide stronger leadership within the Esperanto movement, which had not received organizational guidance from its inventor, Dr. Zamenhof. While Esperantists have little regard for the Delegation and its decisions, partisans of Ido continue to insist that the Delegation Committee was legitimate. The Ido language even today still has a following.

The Encyclopedia of Esperanto summarizes the Esperantists' position as follows:

La "Delegitaro" estis unu-homa afero, sen kunvenoj aŭ difinita regularo. La unu klara regulo, ke aŭtoroj de lingvoprojekto ne rajtas partopreni, estis rompita. El la 12 membroj de la komitato nur du estis lingvistoj, kaj nur 4 partoprenis; oni aldonis nomojn de anstataŭantoj aŭ novaj membroj sen rajtigo. La fina rezolucio estis voĉdonita de nur tri el la 12 plus 4 anstataŭantaj kaj la sekretarioj. Oni sendis al la L. K. 25 kopiojn de la projekto, por disdoni ilin inter 100 membroj de la L. K. (loĝantaj ankaŭ ekster Eŭropo) kaj postulis respondon post unu monato.

The "Delegation" was a one-man enterprise, without meetings or a definitive set of rules. The one clear rule, that authors of language projects have no right to participate, was broken. Of the 12 members of the committee, only two were linguists, and only four participated; they added names of substitutes or new members without permission. The final resolution was voted upon by only three of the twelve plus four substitutes and the secretaries. They sent to the L.K. (Esperanto Language Committee) 25 copies of the project, to distribute among its 100 members (some of whom were living outside of Europe) and demanded a response in one month.

== See also ==
- Esperantido
- Comparison between Esperanto and Ido
