= Paul von Jankó =

Hungarian musician

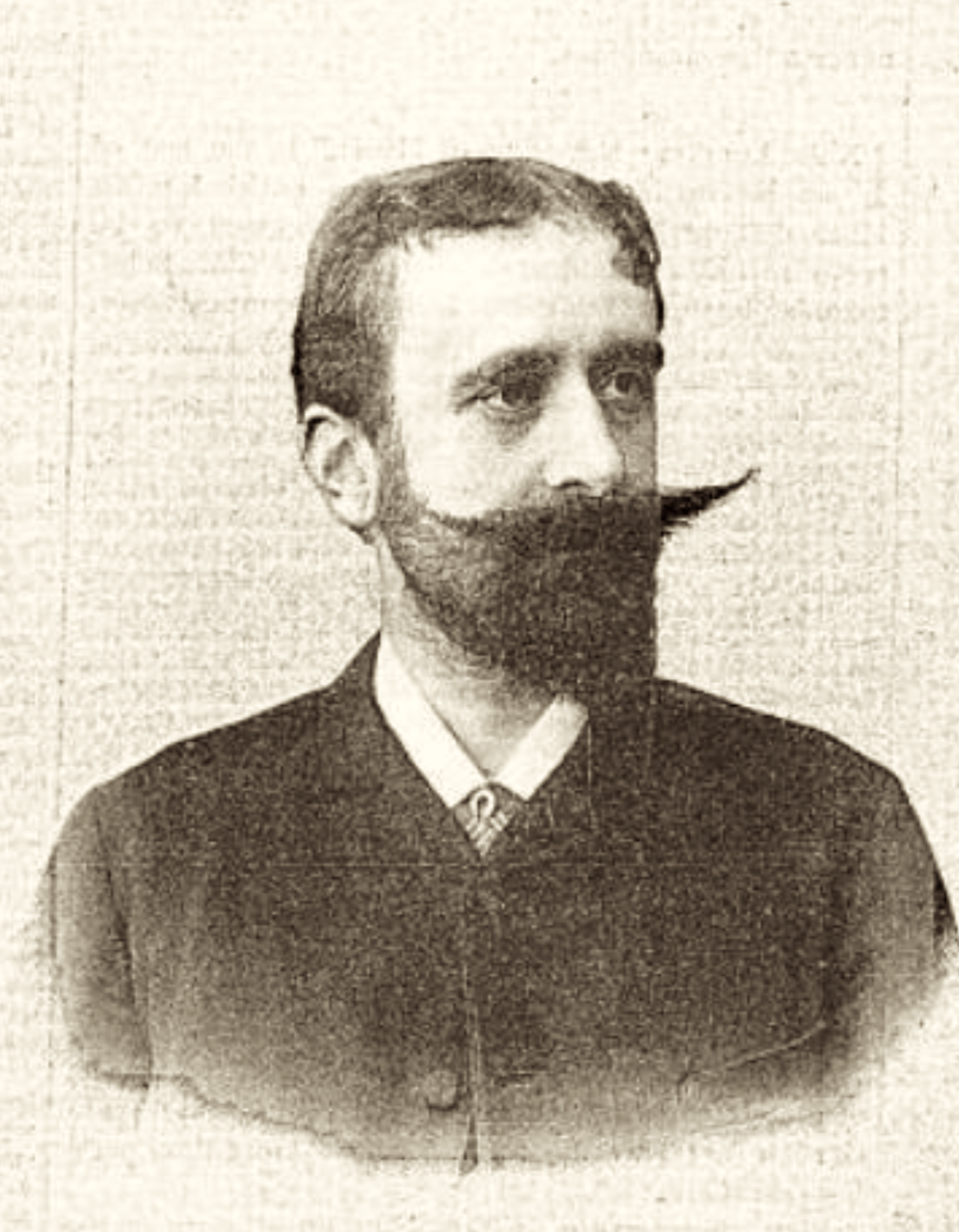
Paul von Jankó in 1890.

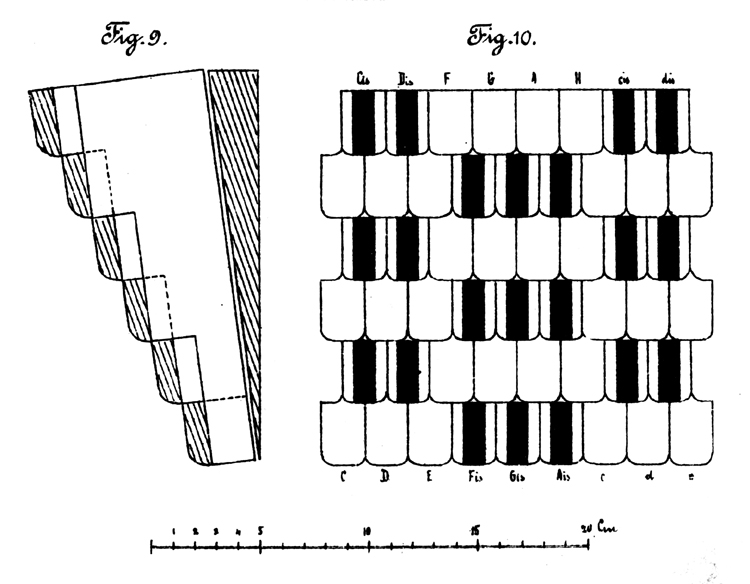

Paul von Jankó (2 June 1856 – 17 March 1919) was a Hungarian pianist, engineer and Idist.

He first studied mathematics and music in Vienna, where he was a pupil of H. Schmitt, J. Krenn and Anton Bruckner. He then moved to Berlin where he during the years 1881 and 1882 studied mathematics at the city's University, and piano with H. Erlich.

Jankó was also a proponent of the international auxiliary language Ido, though he had formerly been an Esperantist. On the 16th of August 1909, Jankó became a member of the Ido-Akademio, the predecessor to the ULI. He was secretary of the Academy from 1912 to 1913. Jankó also created the Ido-Stelo, the symbol of the Ido movement, modelled after the Verda Stelo.

In 1882 Jankó patented the Jankó keyboard, with six rows of keys, drawing upon earlier designs by Conrad Henfling (1708), Johann Rohleder (1791) and William Lunn (1843). From the year 1886 he used this instrument at his own concert journeys. The Norwegian pianist Tekla Nathan Bjerke was a pupil of Jankó, and played many concerts in Norway using this instrument. The Jankó keyboard wasn't used by many people as it was hard for them to relearn new fingering on a strange keyboard.
