= Rosa Junck =

Czech Esperantist (1850–1929)

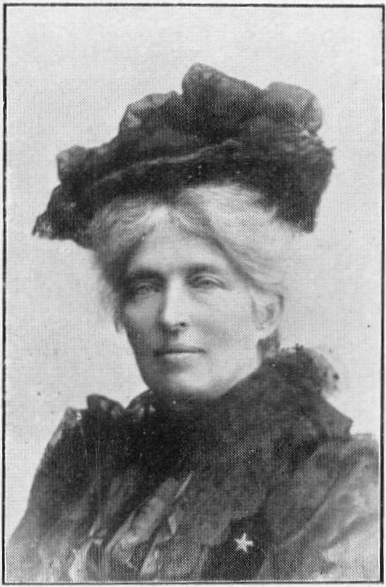
- Junck in 1906
- Born: Růžena Bílková; 24 May 1850; Tábor, Bohemia, Austrian Empire
- Died: 27 July 1929 (aged 79); Bordighera, Italy
- Education: Prague Conservatory
- Occupations: Esperantist, educator, translator and opera singer
- Employer: Provisional Theatre (Prague)

Rosa Junck (born Růžena Bílková; 24 May 1850 – 27 July 1929) was a Czech Esperantist, educator, translator and opera singer.

== Biography ==
Junck was born Růžena Bílková on 24 May 1850 in Tábor, Bohemia, Austrian Empire.

Bílková graduated from the singing department of the Prague Conservatory, and in 1871 she began singing opera at the Provisional Theatre in Prague. After moving to perform in Innsbruck, Tyrol, she met and married a violinist named Junck.

After moving to Bordighera in Italy as a widow around 1890, Junck learned the international auxiliary language Esperanto and became a "pioneer of Esperanto in Italy." She taught languages, was a member of the Esperanto Lingva Komitato (Language Committee) and became vice-president of the Bordighera Esperanto Club.

With her colleague Clarence Bicknell, Junck translated Italian works into Esperanto and vice versa, including Italian works by her friend Edmondo De Amicis and L. L. Zamenhof's Esperanto exercise book Ekzercaro de la lingvo internacia Esperanto.

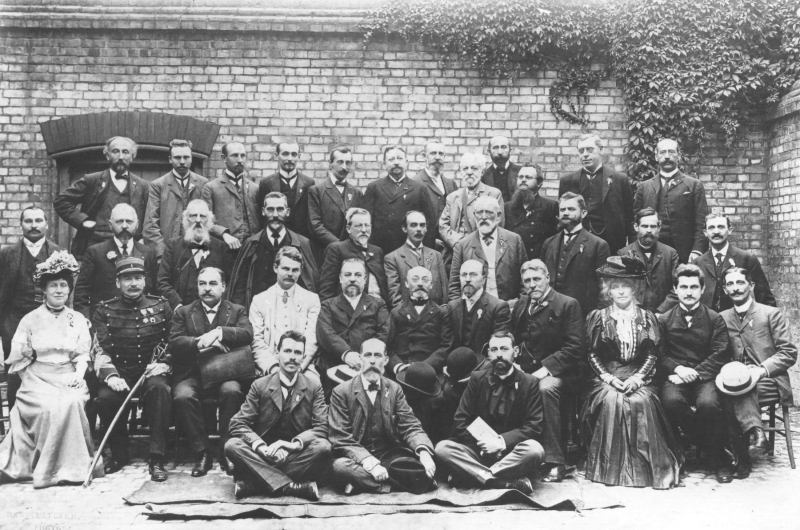
The Lingva Komitato in 1907, Junck is the woman sitting on the right and others pictured include Louis de Beaufront, Louisa Frederica Adela Schafer, and L. L. Zamenhof

Junck attended several early World Esperanto Congresses, including the 1905 Congress in Boulogne-sur-Mer, France, the 1906 Congress in Geneva, Switzerland, and the 1907 Congress in Cambridge, England. Junck was also an international model for the standardised pronunciation of the language, particularly vowel sounds, reciting poems at Esperanto events. Zamenhof described her pronunciation as "exemplary."

Junck died on 27 July 1929 in Bordighera, Italy.

== Publications ==
=== Translations into Esperanto ===
- La Floro De L' Pasinto (1906) and Kverko kaj Floro (1906), by Edmondo De Amicis
  Cover of Junck's Italian translation of L. L. Zamenhof's Esperanto exercise book Ekzercaro de la lingvo internacia Esperanto (1908)

=== Translations into Italian ===
- Ekzercaro de la lingvo internacia Esperanto (1908), by L. L. Zamenhof
- Fundamento de Esperanto (1907), as translation supervisor
