= Louis de Beaufront =

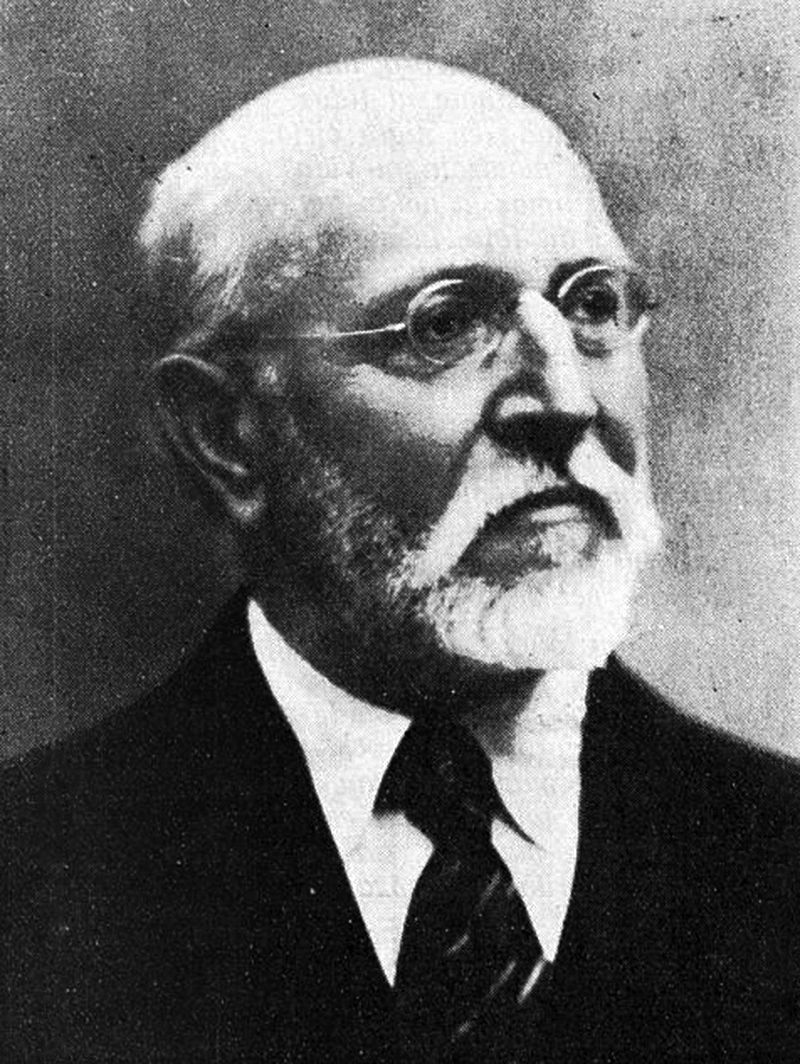
Louis de Beaufront

Louis Chevreux (3 October 1855, Paris – 8 January 1935, Thézy-Glimont), commonly known as Louis de Beaufront, was a major influence in the development of Ido, an international auxiliary language. Beaufront was initially an advocate of Esperanto and was largely responsible for its early diffusion in western Europe as well as one of its first French proponents.

== Work ==
Beaufront first discovered Esperanto in 1888 and in 1898 founded Société Pour la Propagation de l'Espéranto (SPPE). In 1900, he wrote the Commentaire sur la grammaire espéranto.

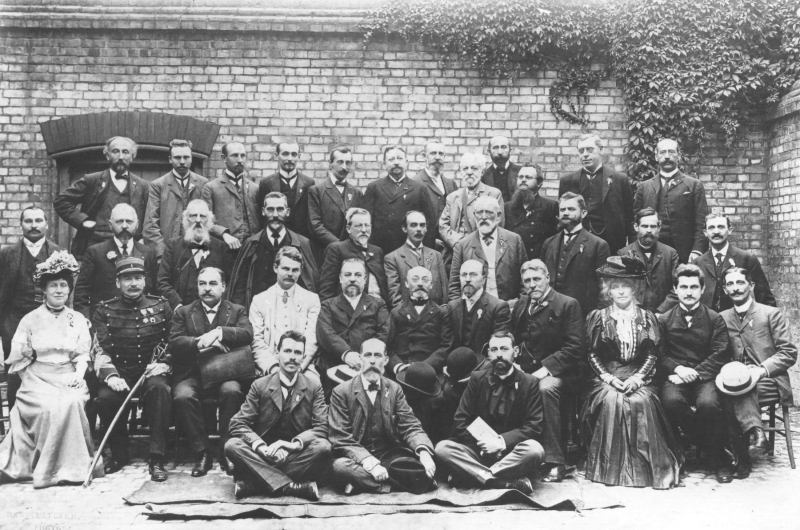
The Lingva Komitato in 1907, people pictured include Louis de Beaufront, Joseph Jamin, Rosa Junck, Louisa Frederica Adela Schafer and L. L. Zamenhof

He was chosen to represent unmodified Esperanto before the Committee of the Delegation for the Adoption of an International Auxiliary Language, attending the meetings of the Delegation Committee in October, 1907. While ostensibly representing Esperanto before the committee, he was secretly secondary author after Louis Couturat of the original Ido project which impressed the Delegation Committee and led to the reform of Esperanto by the committee's Permanent Commission. Letters that are kept in the Department of Planned Languages and Esperanto Museum in Vienna show that he denied any co-authorship of Ido. Beaufront remained a proponent of Ido thereafter, and wrote the influential Ido grammar Kompleta Gramatiko Detaloza, published in 1925.

His personality was an unusual one. He claimed to be a Marquis, and claimed to have had an English grandmother, but there is no evidence for either of these claims.

He appears as a character in Joseph Skibell's 2010 novel, A Curable Romantic.
