= Gender reform in Esperanto =

Planned modernization of gender in Esperanto

Gender asymmetry is an aspect of the constructed international auxiliary language Esperanto which has been challenged by numerous proposals seeking to regularize both grammatical and lexical gender.

In the text below, when a proposed word or usage is not grammatically correct according to the standard rules of Esperanto grammar, it will be marked with an asterisk (*).

== Gender in Esperanto ==
Esperanto does not have grammatical gender other than in the two personal pronouns li "he" and ŝi "she" and their derivatives. Nevertheless, lexical gender is sometimes an issue. In practical usage words formed with the suffix -ul "person" are ambiguous, sometimes used with a masculine meaning in the singular, but generally neutral in the plural. However, concepts of gender have changed over time, and many words that were once considered masculine are now neutral, especially words related to professions and animals. In older texts it is only context that disambiguates. For example, in the saying al feliĉulo eĉ koko donas ovojn "to a happy man, even a koko gives eggs" (Zamenhof), the word koko means "cockerel/rooster", not "chicken". However, this can be confusing to those who are not familiar with that saying, as the word koko has become more neutral over time.

In modern usage, most noun roots are lexically neutral, a couple of dozen are lexically masculine, and a smaller number lexically feminine. Most masculine roots may be made feminine through the addition of the suffix -ino and made to describe a group of both males and females with the addition of ge-. For example, patro means "father", patrino "mother", and gepatroj "parents", but gepatroj cannot traditionally be used in the singular for *gepatro "parent". For these gendered roots there is no easy way to make them gender-neutral in the singular. Often there is a separate root that acts like this, for example knabo "boy" → infano "child"; filo "son" → ido "offspring", etc. Some neutral counterparts can be made with word-building. The approximate meaning of "parent" can be achieved with gener-into "genitor" or ge-patr-ano "one of the parents". However, it is more common to simply say unu el la gepatroj "one of the parents" or patro aŭ patrino "father or mother".

The most common roots that are masculine unless specifically marked as feminine are:

- Kin terms: avo "grandfather", edzo "husband", fianĉo "fiancé", filo "son", frato "brother", nepo "grandson", nevo "nephew", onklo "uncle", patro "father", vidvo "widower", kuzo "(male) cousin"
- Words for boys and men: knabo "boy", viro "man"
- Titles: fraŭlo "bachelor" (a backformation from fraŭlino, derived from German Fräulein), grafo "count", princo "prince", reĝo "king", sinjoro "mister, sir"

Gender-neutral roots such as leono "lion" and kelnero "waiter" may be made feminine with a grammatical suffix (leonino "lioness", kelnerino "waitress"), but there is no comparable way to derive the masculine; there was not even originally a word for "male". Words without a feminine suffix may take a masculine reading, especially in the case of people and domestic animals; koko, for example, means "chicken", but is read as masculine in koko kaj kokino "rooster and hen". Zamenhof used the nominal root vir "man, human male" to make words for animals masculine. Originally this took the form of a suffix -viro, but in response to criticisms that the resulting words such as bovoviro "bull" were ambiguous with mythological man–animal hybrids such as minotaurs (also bovoviro), Zamenhof switched to using vir as a prefix in his translation of Genesis finished in 1915. This usage has spread, and vir- is now widely used as a prefix in the case of animals (virleono "man-lion", virhomo "man-human"), but as a separate adjective vira for professions (vira kelnero "man waiter"), with -viro now considered archaic, though neither of these conventions is as common as feminine -ino. Moreover, the prefix vir- is idiomatic, as virbovo (man-bovine) could still mean either "bull" or "minotaur/cherub"; it is only by convention that it is generally understood to mean "bull", and writers have coined words such as taŭro "bull" to bypass the issue.

== Common elements to regularizing Esperanto gender ==
Critics such as Dale Spender and Veronica Zundel feel that deriving feminine from masculine words causes women to be either "linguistically excluded… or else named negatively", while others are bothered by the lack of symmetry. Such sentiments have sparked numerous attempts at reform, none of which have been accepted by the Akademio de Esperanto.

Reforms tend to address a few key areas:

- A masculine suffix, parallel to the feminine -ino
- An epicene affix
- An epicene pronoun (like s/he or singular they in English)

Three specific proposals surface repeatedly, as they derive from the existing resources of the language. These are the masculine suffix *-iĉo, workarounds and expanded uses of the epicene prefix ge-, and the epicene pronoun *ŝli.

=== Masculine suffixes ===
The most popular proposal for a masculine grammatical suffix is *-iĉo.

While preparing his Reformed Esperanto of 1894, Zamenhof considered *-ir as a masculine grammatical suffix. He considered a male suffix logical but a complication for learners as it was against national customs. Other proposals have been suggested. *-uno was created through ablaut of -ino. (It is, in fact, the only such possibility, as -ano, -eno, and -ono already exist.) Similarly, *-olo was created through ablaut of -ulo "person". *-iĉo was created by analogy with the pet-name suffix -ĉjo, the only masculine suffix in the language, so that pet names and the gender suffixes would be symmetrical:

	Endearment	Gender
Feminine	-njo	-ino
Masculine	-ĉjo	*-iĉo

An element common to all such proposals is that the gender-changing nouns are to be reanalyzed as gender neutral when they occur without a gender suffix, as the names of professions and nationalities came to be treated in the mid twentieth century, such as policano "policeman" → "police officer" and anglo "Englishman" → "English person". This doesn't affect all words: Nouns that never changed gender to begin with, such as taŭro "bull", do not take gender suffixes in these reforms either. The resulting paradigms are as follows:

		Standard	Un-proposal	Iĉ-proposal	Endearment
Neutral	"parent"	gepatroj (plural only)	*patro		—
Feminine	"mother"	patrino			panjo "mama"
Masculine	"father"	patro	*patruno	*patriĉo	paĉjo "papa"

The most common objection to the *-iĉo proposal is the very analysis of words such as "patro" as gender neutral. The reason behind the objection is that the specifically masculine words are defined as such in the Fundamento, and it is felt that reanalyzing them as gender neutral violates the Fundamento. One proposed solution to this problem is to introduce new root words for the gender neutral concepts: parent, sibling, grandparent, grandchild, etc. As an example, the currently neologistic root word *parento (parent) can accept both *-iĉo to denote father and -ino to denote mother.

Though none of these are widespread, *-iĉo has appeared in books published by Jorge Camacho and Luiz Portella.

Proponents of one proposal often claim that a competing proposal is confusing because it resembles an existing suffix, for example that *patriĉo "father" resembles pejorative patraĉo "a bad father", or that *patruno "father" resembles patrino "mother", but there does not seem to be a problem in actual use: With the word stress on the suffix vowel, -iĉo/-aĉo and -uno/-ino are as distinct as many other pairs of Esperanto suffixes, such as -ilo/-ulo. One specific objection to the -iĉo proposal is that *nepiĉo "grandson" is homophonous with ne piĉo, piĉo being Esperanto slang for "pussy"; on the other hand, uno would mean not just "a male" but also "the UN".

=== Epicene prefixes ===
Various epicene affixes have also been proposed. They may be proposed instead of a masculine suffix—that is, gender derivation remains as in standard Esperanto, but the language gains a simple way of saying "a parent"—or in addition to a masculine suffix, often to avoid confusion between people speaking reformed and standard Esperanto. The only such affix commonly seen is the prefix ge-. In standard Esperanto, ge- means both sexes together, and is normally only seen in the plural. In conversation, however, singular ge- is not uncommonly extended to meanings such as *gepatro "a parent" when a speaker either doesn't know or doesn't wish to reveal the gender of the noun. Many gender-reform proposals would make such usage official.

Epicene ge-
		Without masculine	With masculine
Neutral	"parent"	*gepatro	
Feminine	"mother"	patrino	
Masculine	"father"	patro	*patriĉo

People who use *patriĉo for "father" may avoid the unaffixed noun patro "*parent" altogether as ambiguous, or may use it and switch to *gepatro only when they need to disambiguate.

=== Treatment of gendered words ===
Many of these proposals propose that all gender-changing words such as patro become neutral once a masculine suffix is in use, with the only remaining gendered words being those such as taŭro and damo that never changed gender to begin with. However, since viro has numerous masculine uses, and there are already dedicated words for the neutral and feminine equivalents (adolto "adult" or plenkreskulo "grownup", and femino "woman"), viro is also commonly retained as a masculine root.

The word eŭnuko "eunuch" has, through back-formation, given rise to the suffix *-uko for castrated people or animals, creating forms such as *bovuko "steer", from bovo "cattle", to replace okso "steer", though eks- "ex-" is sometimes seen in this context: eksvirkato "castrated cat" (lit. "ex-man-cat") vs. *katuko.

== Gender-neutral pronouns ==
As in English, Esperanto has a personal pronoun for "he", li, and "she", ŝi. Paraphrasing li aŭ ŝi "he or she" to avoid mentioning gender is, as in English, considered awkward, exclusive, and is avoided in conversation and literature. There are two general approaches to resolving this issue: modifying an existing pronoun, and creating a new pronoun.

=== Extending the range of an existing pronoun ===
The existing third-person pronouns are li "he" (the pronoun traditionally used when gender is not known), ŝi "she", ĝi "it", ili "they", oni "one", si (reflexive), tiu "that one".

Ĝi is used principally with animals and objects. Zamenhof also prescribed it to be the epicene pronoun for people when the gender of an individual is unknown, saying it was "completely correct grammatically". He most often used it for children, but also for adults with known gender:

La infano ploras, ĉar ĝi volas manĝi "the child is crying, because it wants to eat".
Ĝi estas la sinjoro de nia loko, sinjoro vicgrafo de ... "They are the lord of our place, lord viscount of ..."

The idea that ĝi cannot be used for people is due to its use as a neuter pronoun. In Zamenhof's day it was customary to specify gender whenever it was known. A shift from li and ŝi to ĝi would thus be a stylistic extension similar to the ongoing shift from copula-plus-adjective to verb (such as bluas for estas blua), and nothing so radical as the creation of a new pronoun would be required.

However, when gender becomes a problem it is much more common for people to use the demonstrative adjective and pronoun tiu (that one) as a work-around. Unfortunately, this remedy is not always available. For example, in the sentence,

Iu ĵus diris, ke li malsatas "Someone just said that he is hungry",

the pronoun li cannot easily be replaced with tiu, as that would normally be understood to refer to someone other than the person speaking:

Iu ĵus diris, ke *tiu malsatas "Someone just said that that person is hungry".

Similar problems of confusion arise with trying to use oni "one" in such situations:

Iu ĵus diris, ke *oni malsatas "Someone just said that one is hungry".

This could be used to express deference or other forms of indirectness, but would not be understood to refer to the person who made the statement.

It would be possible to extend the use of reflexive pronoun si, which officially cannot occur in subject position, to that of a logophoric pronoun:

Iu ĵus diris, ke *si malsatas "Someone just said that himself/herself is hungry".

Although not a full solution, as si refers to a previously mentioned person, this could be used in combination with tiu to introduce a subject. It also has the advantage of clarifying the sentence, since it is ambiguous in standard Esperanto whether li "he" refers to the someone who is speaking, or someone else. However, logophoric pronouns are alien to European languages, and this solution is rare.

Due to English influence, singular "they" has been reported:

Iu ĵus diris, ke *ili malsatas "Someone just said that they are hungry."

However this causes problems regarding Esperanto’s noun agreements and is not readily accepted by people of other language backgrounds.

A proposal is to hyphenate li (he) and ŝi (she) to li-ŝi or ŝi-li, similar to some other constructs in Esperanto, such as pli-malpli (more or less).

=== New pronouns ===
Existing Esperanto personal pronouns end in i, and only two proposals for a new pronoun are at all common: *ri and the blend *ŝli.

As of 2019, *ri is the most popular gender-neutral pronoun proposal.

Another proposal is the blend *ŝli, the reading pronunciation of the abbreviation ŝ/li "s/he". It is frequently seen in informal writing.

Gender-neutral pronoun proposals
Type	Traditional	ri	generic ri	ĝi	ŝli
Epicene	li	*ri	*ri	*ĝi	*ŝli
Masculine	li		*ri	li	
Feminine	ŝi		*ri	ŝi	
Neuter	ĝi				
Plural	ili				

=== Gender in plural pronouns ===
In addition to removing gender from the singular pronouns, proposals have also been made to add gender to the plural in order to better translate material (such as the Bible) that was written in a language that has plural gender.

Due to the symmetry between li "he" and ili "they", the obvious choice is to make ili masculine and to create an analogous feminine form, *iŝi. This was proposed by Kálmán Kalocsay and Gaston Waringhien in the third edition of their Plena Gramatiko de Esperanto (pp 72–73, note 1). They cited the biblical passage Matthew 28:10-11:

Tiam Jesuo diris al ili (la virinoj): Ne timu; iru, diru al miaj fratoj, ke ili foriru en Galileon, kaj tie ili min vidos. Kaj dum ili iris...
"Then Jesus said to them [the women], “Do not be afraid. Go and tell my brothers to go to Galilee. They will see me there.” While they were going, ..."

It is obvious from context that "They will see me there" refers to the brothers. However, the identity of the "they" in "While they were going" is completely opaque. Kalocsay and Waringhien proposed the following solution:

Tiam Jesuo diris al *iŝi: Ne timu, iru, diru al miaj fratoj, ke ili foriru en Galileon, kaj tie ili min vidos. Kaj dum *iŝi iris...

== See also ==
- Male as norm
- Modern evolution of Esperanto
