= Union for the International Language Ido =

Uniono por la Linguo Internaciona Ido
- Abbreviation: ULI
- Formation: 31 July 1910
- Headquarters: Amsterdam, Netherlands
- Website: http://en.ido.li/

Union for the International Language Ido (Ido: Uniono por la Linguo Internaciona Ido, ULI) is the official union of the Ido-language movement from 1910. Based in Amsterdam, Netherlands, its main functions are the propagation of the language, arranging the yearly conferences in which Ido speakers gather, and the publishing of the magazine Progreso (Progress), begun in 1908 by Louis Couturat, one of the founders of the movement who died in 1914. The ULI is to Ido as the Universal Esperanto Association is to Esperanto.

The current ULI-president is Gaël Richard.

== International Ido conventions ==
The ULI organises Ido conventions yearly.

- 2025: Atlantic City, USA
- 2024: Madrid, Spain
- 2023: Kassel, Germany
- 2022: Dessau, Germany
- 2019: Berlin, Germany, 15 participants from 2 countries (Information)
- 2018: Provins, France, 11 participants from 5 countries (Information)
- 2017: České Budějovice, Czech Republic, 8 participants from 5 countries (Information)
- 2016: Valencia, Spain, 10 participants from 7 countries (Information)
- 2015: Berlin, Germany, 14 participants (Information)
- 2014: Paris, France (Information)
- 2013: Ouroux-en-Morvan, France, 13 participants from 4 countries (Information)
- 2012: Dessau, Germany, 12 participants (Information)
- 2011: Echternach, Luxembourg (Information), 24 participants from 11 countries
- 2010: Tübingen, Germany (Information)
- 2009: Riga, Latvia, and Tallinn, Estonia, 14 participants from 7 countries (Information)
- 2008: Wuppertal-Neviges, Germany, 18 participants from 5 countries (Information)
- 2007: Paris, France, 14 participants from 9 countries (Information, Photos)
- 2006: Berlin, Germany, approx. 25 participants from 10 countries (Information)
- 2005: Toulouse, France, 13 participants from 4 countries (Information)
- 2004: Kyiv, Ukraine, 17 participants from 9 countries (Information)
- 2003: Großbothen, Germany, participants from 6 countries (Information)
- 2002: Kraków, Poland, 14 participants from 6 countries (Information)
- 2001: Nuremberg, Germany, 14 participants from 5 countries (Information)
- 2000: Nuremberg, Germany
- 1999: Waldkappel, Germany
- 1998: Białobrzegi, Poland, 15 participants from 6 countries
- 1997: Bakkum, Netherlands, 19 participants from 7 countries
- 1995: Elsnigk, Germany
- 1991: Ostend, Belgium, 21 participants
- 1990: Waldkappel, Germany
- 1989: Zürich-Thalwil, Switzerland
- 1987: Eschwege, Germany
- 1985: Antwerp, Belgium
- 1983: York, England
- 1981: Jongny, Switzerland
- 1980: Namur, Belgium, 35 participants
- 1979: Uppsala, Sweden
- 1978: Cambridge, England
- 1977: Tegel, Germany
- 1976: Saint-Nazaire, France
- 1975: Thun, Switzerland
- 1974: Kyiv, Ukraine
- 1973: Cardiff, Wales
- 1972: Chaux-de-Fonds, Switzerland
- 1971: Trollhättan, Sweden
- 1970: Luxembourg City, Luxembourg
- 1969: Zürich, Switzerland
- 1968: Berlin, Germany
- 1967: Bourges, France
- 1966: Biella, Italy
- 1965: Lons-le-Saunier, France
- 1964: Kiel, Germany
- 1963: Barcelona, Spain
- 1962: Thun, Switzerland
- 1961: Zürich, Switzerland, c. 50 participants
- 1960: Colmar, France
- 1959: Freiburg im Breisgau, Germany
- 1957: Luxembourg City, Luxembourg
- 1952: Berlin, Germany
- 1951: Turin, Italy
- 1950: Colmar, France
- 1939: St. Gallen, Switzerland
- 1937: Paris, France
- 1936: Szombathely, Hungary
- 1935: Fredericia, Denmark
- 1934: Oostduinkerke, Belgium
- 1933: Mondorf, Luxembourg
- 1931: Lauenburg/Elbe, Germany
- 1930: Sopron, Hungary
- 1929: Freiburg im Breisgau, Germany
- 1928: Zürich, Switzerland
- 1927: Paris, France
- 1926: Prague, Czechoslovakia
- 1925: Turin, Italy
- 1924: Luxembourg City, Luxembourg
- 1923: Kassel, Germany
- 1922: Dessau, Germany
- 1921: Vienna, Austria
