= Louisa Frederica Adela Schafer =

English Esperantist and singer (born 1865)

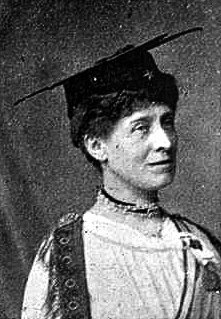
- Born: 11 February 1865; London, England
- Died: Unknown
- Other name: Ad. Ŝefer
- Occupations: Esperanto speaker, solo singer, translator and languages teacher
- Organization: British Esperanto Association
- Notable work: Tekstaro de bonkonataj britaj kantoj kompilita de Ad. Ŝefer (1905)

Louisa Frederica Adela Schafer (born 11 February 1865) was an English Esperanto speaker, solo singer, translator and languages teacher.

== Biography ==
Schafer was born in London, England, in 1865.

Schafer spoke Esperanto, the world's most widely spoken constructed international auxiliary language. She was elected to the London Esperanto Club, was secretary of the sub-committee of The British Esperantist journal from its inception in 1904, and was a member of the English Lingva Komitato (Linguistic Committee) from 1907.

Schafer gave lectures and talks on Esperanto to organisations around London, such as to the Finsbury and City Teachers Association in 1905. She also attended many early World Esperanto Congresses, including the first in Boulogne-sur-Mer, France, in 1905.

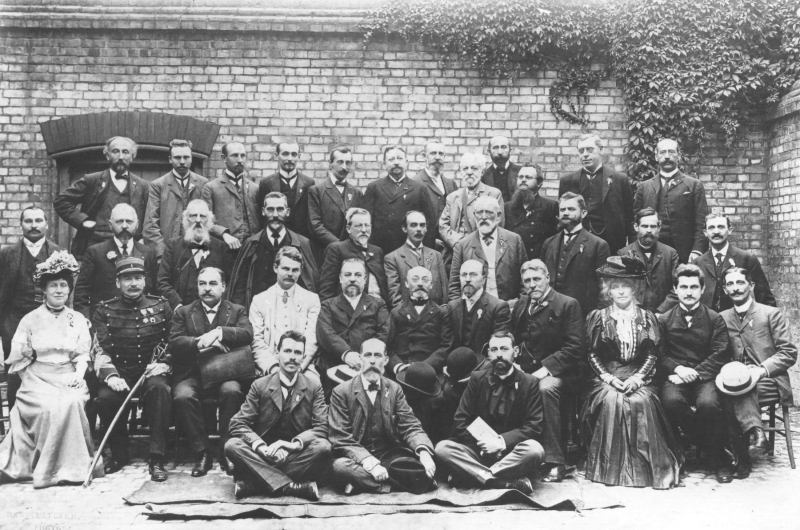
The Lingva Komitato in 1907, Schafer is the woman sitting on the bottom left and others pictured include Louis de Beaufront, Joseph Jamin, Rosa Junck and L. L. Zamenhof

Schafer translated secular songs and religious hymns (such as "How sweet the name of Jesus sounds") from English into Esperanto under the name "Ad. Ŝefer." She also wrote the songs "Antauen!" in Esperanto. She published a compilation of Esperanto songs and lyric translations in 1905 with the British Esperanto Association.

When William Shakespeare's play Hamlet was translated into Esperanto, Schafer noted 95 words used in the translation that did not appear in the Universala Vortaro (Universal Dictionary), published in 1894 by Esperanto creator L. L. Zamenhof.

When the play The Bear, translated by Vasily Devyatnin was performed at the 8th British Theatre in Kraków in 1912, Schafer played the role of Elena Ivanovna Popova, the widow of a landowner.

Her year of death is unknown.

== Publications ==
- Tekstaro de bonkonataj britaj kantoj kompilita de Ad. Ŝefer (Words of well-known British songs compiled by Adela Schafer), London: British Esperanto Association (1905)
