= English false friends in Ido =

Misleadingly similar terms in constructed language

This is a list of English false friends in the constructed language Ido.

== Words with different meaning ==
Ido word	means in English	whereas English word	is translated to Ido as
an	on, at, to (being in contact)	a / an	(always omitted)
angoro	anguish, agony	anger	iraco
avertar	to advertise, to warn	avert	eskartar, preventar
bruiso	noise	bruise	ekimoso
chapelo	hat	chapel	kapelo
demandar	to ask for, to request	to demand	postular
dextra	right (side, direction)	dexterous	habila
divenar	to become	divine	konjektar, predicar
do	therefore	to do	facar
domo	house	dome	kupolo
dronar	to drown	to drone	zumar
editar	to publish	to edit	redaktar
fendar	to split, cleave	to fend	defensar
fiera	proud	fiery	fairala, ardoroza
flarar	to smell	to flare (up)	flagrar
for	far from, away from	for	por
fundo	ground, river-/seabed, background	fund	kapitalo, kaso
gamo	gamut, scale	game	ludo (plaything), vildo (beasts)
glitar	glide, slip	to glitter	brilar
grapo	cluster (of fruits, flowers)	grape	vit-bero
graso	fat	grass	herbo, gazono
guto	drop (of liquid)	gut	intestino
halo	large covered space, hall	halo	halono, aureolo
hike	here	to hike	(~promenar)
hisar	raise flag or sail	to hiss	sisar
kapo	head	cap	kasqueto, kepio
kava	hollow, cavity	cave	kaverno
klamar	to shout, exclaim	to claim	postular, reklamacar, pretendar
klefo	key	cleft	fenduro, krevisuro
kompostar	to set up in type	to compost	(~facar dungo)
komprar	to buy	to compare	komparar
lego	law	leg	gambo
lejera	light, lightweight	lecherous	laciva
lektar	to read	lecture	diskursar, donar leciono, reprimandar
likar	to leak	to like	prizar
lore	at that time	lore	savajo, folklore
maro	sea	mare	kavalino
mentiar	to lie	to mention	mencionar
milito	war	militia	milico
momento	momentum	moment	instanto
mordar	to bite	to murder	ocidar
on	one, someone, they	on	sur (upon, above), an (at, to), enswichita (switched on)
or	now, but (in argument)	or	o / od
pago	payment	page	pagino (of book), pajo (occupation)
pano	bread	pan	padelo, kasrolo, tortuyo
parento	relative	parent	genitoro, patro/matro
pino	pine	pin	pinglo
plena	full	plain (adjective)	plana (level), simpla (simple)
postular	to demand	to postulate	postulatigar
razar	to shave	to raze	rezigar
regardar	to look	to regard	egardar, estimar
revar	to dream	to rave	delirar
ridar	to laugh	to ride	vehar, vetur-irar, biciklirar, kavalkar
sablo	sand	sable	zibelino
salo	salt	sale	vendo
salto	jump	salt	salo
sana	healthy	sane	mente sana
sat	enough	sat (past of sit)	sidis
sedo	bottom (of body)	seed	semino, grano
sentima	fearless	sentimental	sentimentala
shaki	chess	shah	sha
shaki	chess	to shake	sukusar, tremar
sika	dry	sick	malada, nauzeanta
singla	each	single	sola, unika
sinistra	left	sinister	malauguroza, maligna
sive	either (as in either..or)	sieve	sivo, kriblo
sizar	seize, gripe, grasp	to size up	evaluar
spegulo	mirror	speckle	makulo
standar	to be in a certain state	to stand	stacar
studio	learning	studio	studieyo
stripo	trouser-strap	strip	strio, bendo
superba	conceited, arrogant	superb	ecelanta
tala	of that kind	tall	alta
testo	witness	test	probo, exameno
time	fearing (adverb)	time	tempo
tirar	to pull	to tire	fatigar
tornar	turn in a lathe	to turn	turnar
trancho	cutting	trench	trancheo
trompar	deceive	to tramp(le)	fular
truo	hole	truth	verajo
varo	wares, goods	war	milito
vento	wind	vent	aerotruo, aperturo
volo	will	vole	kampomuso

== Ido words that have narrower meaning ==
Ido word	means in English	whereas English word with meaning	is translated to Ido as
disho	dish (food)	dish (plate)	plado
doktoro	doctor (holder of a degree)	doctor (healer)	mediko, kuracisto
glaso	glass (cup)	glass (material)	vitro
grosa	fat, wide	gross (repulsive)	repulsanta
hazardo	occasion, accident	hazard (risk)	risko
idiomo	language, dialect	idiom (expression)	idiotismo
kloko	o'clock	clock (timepiece)	horlojo
kordo	rope, string	chord (music)	harmonio
lando	country	land (ground)	tero
magazino	warehouse, firearm magazine ("clip")	magazine (publication)	jurnalo, revuo
olda	old (living beings only)	old (non-living)	anciena
rango	range (row, rank)	range (length between)	extenseso, porteo
spaco	space (in general)	outer space, cosmos	kosmos
standard	flag, banner	standard (of measures etc.)	normo
striko	strike (of workers)	strike (hit)	frapo
sturmo	storm (with lightning)	storming (military)	asalto
verko	work (e.g. literary)	work (labor)	laboro, travalio, faco

== Ido words that have broader meaning ==
Ido word	means in English not only	but also
desegnar	to design	to draw (make images)
hundo	hound	dog
krayono	crayon	pencil
ligo	league	link
me	me (accusative)	I
neta	net (price)	clean
obscura	obscured	dark, dim
redaktar	redact	edit
robo	robe	woman's dress
tablo	table	desk
