= Léopold Leau =

French mathematician

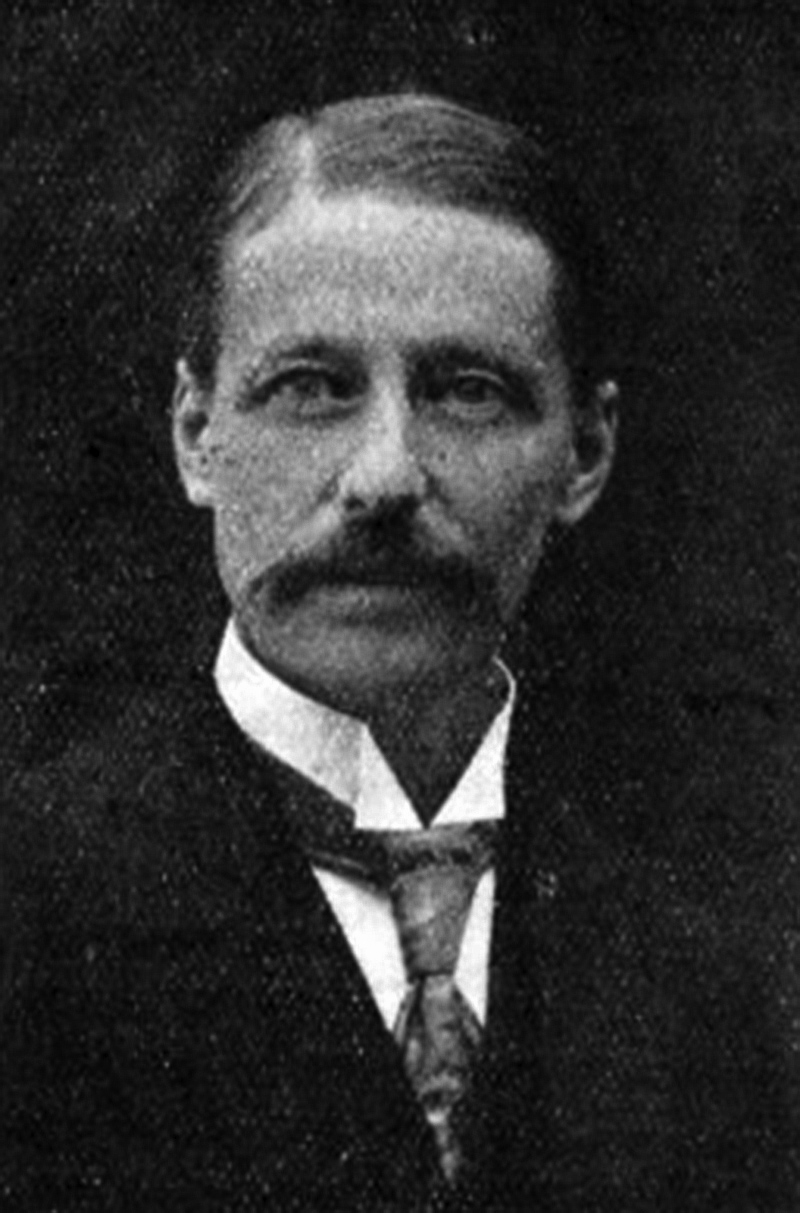
- Born: 1868
- Died: 1943 (aged 74–75)
- Scientific career
- Fields: Mathematics
- Thesis: Étude sur les équations fonctionnelles à une ou à plusieurs variables (1897)

Léopold Leau (1868-1943) was a French mathematician, primarily known for his ties to international auxiliary languages.

The Delegation for the Adoption of an International Auxiliary Language was founded on 7 January 1901 on Leau's initiative. He co-wrote with Prof. Louis Couturat the monumental Histoire de la Langue Universelle (1903) and its supplement Les Nouvelles Langues Internationales (1907).

Leau studied at the École normal supérieure in Paris and received his doctorate there in April 1897. Later he was a professor at the University of Nancy . There he was Dean of the Faculté des Sciences from 1931–34. In his dissertation, Leau examined, among other things, the iteration behavior of holomorphic functions in the environment of a rationally indifferent fixed point. His results are known today under the name (Leau-Fatou) Flower Theorem . They play an important role in the complex dynamics.
