= Conrad Henfling =

Conrad Henfling (1648–1716 Ansbach, Germany), musicologist, musician, mathematician and lawyer was an official and privy councilor (Hofrat) at the court of the Margrave of Ansbach, Germany. He also invented a new type of keyboard for organ and harpsichord, the design of which was extended by Paul von Janko in his 1882 patent for a keyboard layout.

In a letter dated 30 August 1706, he wrote to Gottfried Wilhelm Leibniz dealing with many issues of music theory he sets out detailed calculations for a method of musical temperament, using Euclid's algorithm in his reasoning. Leibniz had Henfling's work published as "Epistola de novo suo systemate musico" in Miscellanea berolinensia, in 1710.
