= International Association of Academies =

Education organisation, 1899 to 1913

- Abbreviation: IAA
- Formation: 1899–1913
- Type: Disestablished
- Official language: English
- Website: None

The International Association of Academies (1899–1913) was an academy designed for the purpose of linking the various Academies around the world, of which the first meeting was held in Paris, France, in 1900. The first president was M. J. de Goeje, a Dutch Orientalist.

== See also ==
- International Council for Science
