= Louis Couturat =

French logician, mathematician, philosopher, and linguist

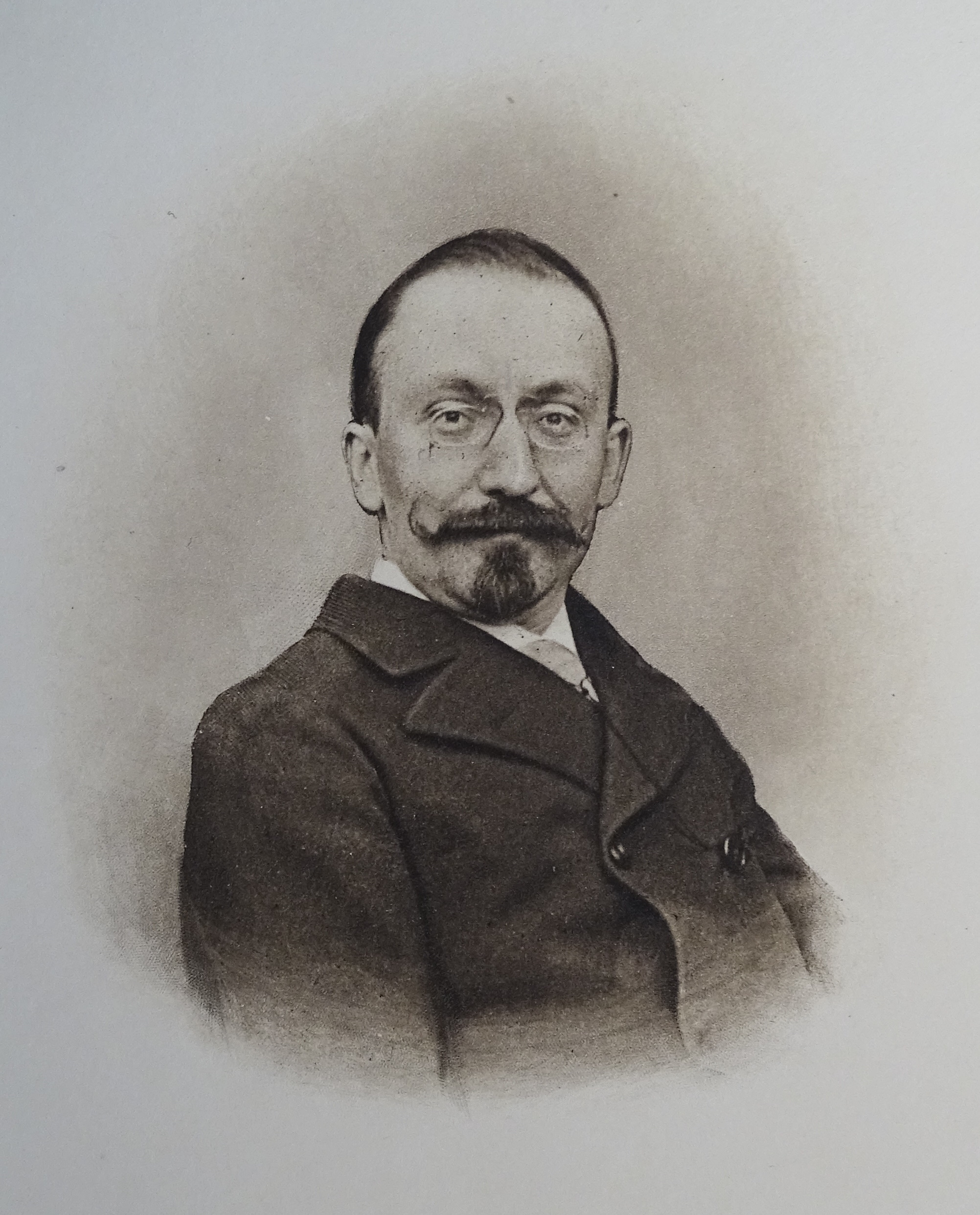
- Born: 17 January 1868; Paris, France
- Died: 3 August 1914 (aged 46); Ris-Orangis, Seine-et-Oise, France
- Education: École Normale Supérieure
- Occupations: Logician, philosopher, mathematician, linguist
- Known for: Ido

Louis Couturat (French: [kutyʁa]; 17 January 1868 – 3 August 1914) was a French logician, mathematician, philosopher, and linguist. Couturat was a pioneer of the constructed language Ido.

== Life and education ==
Born in Paris. In 1887 he entered École Normale Supérieure to study philosophy and mathematics. In 1895 he lectured in philosophy at the University of Toulouse and 1897 lectured in philosophy of mathematics at the University of Caen Normandy, taking a stand in favor of transfinite numbers. After a time in Hanover studying the writings of Leibniz, he became an assistant to Henri-Louis Bergson at the Collège de France in 1905.

== Career ==
He was the French advocate of the symbolic logic that emerged in the years before World War I, thanks to the writings of Charles Sanders Peirce, Giuseppe Peano and his school, and especially to The Principles of Mathematics by Couturat's friend and correspondent Bertrand Russell. Like Russell, Couturat saw symbolic logic as a tool to advance both mathematics and the philosophy of mathematics. In this, he was opposed by Henri Poincaré, who took considerable exception to Couturat's efforts to interest the French in symbolic logic. With the benefit of hindsight, we can see that Couturat was in broad agreement with the logicism of Russell, while Poincaré anticipated Brouwer's intuitionism.

His first major publication was De Platonicis mythis (1896). In 1901, he published La Logique de Leibniz, a detailed study of Leibniz the logician, based on his examination of the huge Leibniz Nachlass in Hanover. Even though Leibniz had died in 1716, his Nachlass was cataloged only in 1895. Only then was it possible to determine the extent of Leibniz's unpublished work on logic. In 1903, Couturat published much of that work in another large volume, his Opuscules et Fragments Inedits de Leibniz, containing many of the documents he had examined while writing La Logique. Couturat was thus the first to appreciate that Leibniz was the greatest logician during the more than 2000 years that separate Aristotle from George Boole and Augustus De Morgan. A significant part of the 20th century Leibniz revival is grounded in Couturat's editorial and exegetical efforts. This work on Leibniz attracted Russell, also the author of a 1900 book on Leibniz, and thus began their professional correspondence and friendship.

In 1905, Couturat published a work on logic and the foundations of mathematics (with an appendix on Kant's philosophy of mathematics) that was originally conceived as a translation of Russell's Principles of Mathematics. In the same year, he published L'Algèbre de la logique, a classic introduction to Boolean algebra and the works of C.S. Peirce and Ernst Schröder.

In 1907, Couturat helped found the constructed language Ido, an offshoot of Esperanto, and was Ido's principal advocate over the remainder of his life. By advocating a constructed international language, constructed along logical principles and with a vocabulary taken from existing European languages, Couturat was paralleling Peano's advocacy of Interlingua. By pushing Ido, Couturat walked in Leibniz's footsteps: Leibniz called for the creation a universal symbolic and conceptual language he named the characteristica universalis.

Couturat, a confirmed pacifist, was killed when his car was hit by a car carrying orders for the mobilization of the French Army, in the first stage of World War I.

He appears as a character in Joseph Skibell's 2010 novel, A Curable Romantic.

== Works ==
- 1896: De Platonicis mythis Thesim Facultati Litterarum Parisiensi proponebat Ludovicus Couturat, Scholae Normalae olim alumnus. Parisiis: Felix Alcan Bibliopola. 120 p.
- 1896: De l'Infini mathématique. Republished 1975, Georg Olms.
- 1901: La Logique de Leibniz. Republished 1961, Georg Olms. Donald Rutherford's English translation in progress.
- 1903: Opuscules et Fragments Inédits de Leibniz. Republished 1966, Georg Olms.
- 1903: (with Léopold Leau) Histoire de la langue universelle. Paris: Hachette. Republished 2001, Olms.
- 1905. Les Principes des Mathématiques: avec un appendice sur la philosophie des mathématiques de Kant. Republished 1965, Georg Olms.
- 1905: L'Algèbre de la logique. 1914: Lydia Gillingham Robinson (trans.), P. E. B. Jourdain (preface), The Algebra of Logic, Open Court, from Project Gutenberg.
- 1906: ¨Pour la langue internationale, Päris
- 1907: (with Léopold Leau) Les nouvelles langues internationales. Paris: Hachette, republished 2001, Olms.
- 1910: Étude sur la dérivation dans la langue internationale. Paris: Delagrave. 100 p.
- 1910: (with Otto Jespersen, R. Lorenz, Wilhelm Ostwald and L.Pfaundler) International Language and Science: Considerations on the Introduction of an International Language into Science, Constable and Company Limited, London.
- 1915: (with Louis de Beaufront) Dictionnari Français-Ido. Paris: Chaix, 586 p.

== Sources ==
- L'oeuvre de Louis Couturat. Presses de l'École Normale Supérieure. 1983. Proceedings of a conference.
- Grattan-Guinness, Ivor (2000). The Search for Mathematical Roots 1870-1940. Princeton University Press. Bibliography contains 27 items by Couturat.
