= Joseph Skibell =

American novelist

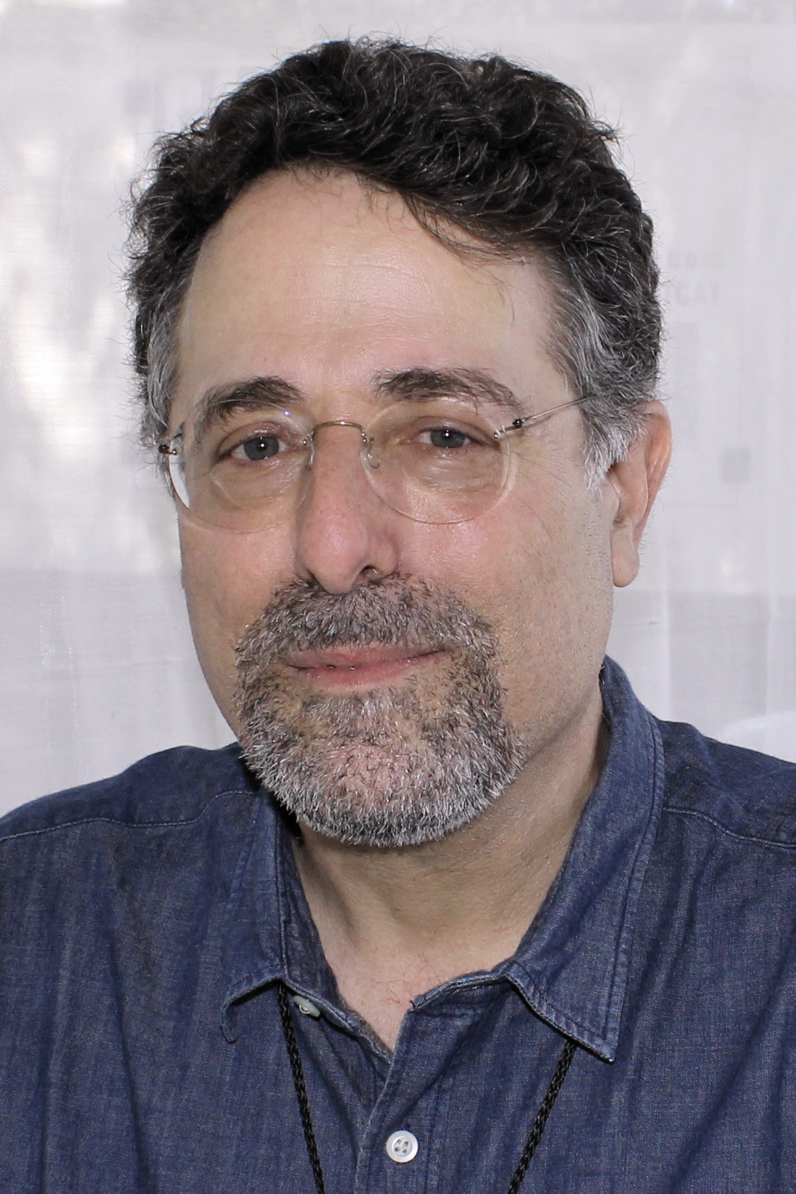
- Skibell at the 2015 Texas Book Festival
- Born: October 18, 1959 (age 66); Lubbock, Texas, U.S.
- Occupation: Author
- Website: www.josephskibell.com

Joseph Skibell (born October 18, 1959) is an American novelist and essayist living in Atlanta, Georgia, and Tesuque, New Mexico.

Skibell is the author of three novels, which use elements of history and fantasy, a collection of true stories, and a forthcoming mythopoetic study of the tales in the Talmud:

- A Blessing on the Moon (1997)
- The English Disease (2003)
- A Curable Romantic (2010)
- My Father's Guitar & Other Imaginary Things (2015)
- Six Memos from the Last Millennium: A Novelist Reads the Talmud (2016).

== Early life ==
Skibell was born in Lubbock, Texas. After graduating from the University of Texas at Austin in 1981, he took a Master of Fine Arts degree from the Texas Center of Writers (now the Michener Center for Writers) in 1996. His brother is actor Steven Skybell, with whom he studies in the Talmudic Daf Yomi program.

== Academic career ==
He was the Jay C. and Ruth Hall Fellow in Fiction at the Wisconsin Institute for Creative Writing at the University of Wisconsin in Madison during the academic year of 1996–97. In 2002, he received a National Endowment for the Arts grant.

Skibell has taught at the University of Wisconsin, the Humber School for Writers, the Taos Summer Writers Conference, and Bar-Ilan University. A recent Senior Fellow at the Bill & Carol Fox Center for Humanistic Inquiry (2014–15), he is currently the Winship Distinguished Research Professor in the Humanities at Emory University.

== Prizes and recognition ==
His work has been translated into a half-dozen languages, and he has won the Richard and Hinda Rosenthal Foundation Award from the American Academy of Arts and Letters, the Sami Rohr Award in Jewish Literature, the Turner Prize for First Fiction and the Jesse H. Jones Award for Best Book of Fiction from Texas Institute of Letters, and a fellowship in fiction for the National Endowment for the Arts. His novel A Blessing on the Moon was adapted into an opera by composer Andy Teirstein.

His essays and short fiction have appeared in Story, Tikkun, The New York Times, Poets & Writers, Maggid, and other periodicals, as well as in the anthologies Nothing Makes You Free: Writing from the Second Generation On, edited by Melvin Bukiet; Rules of Thumb: 73 Authors Reveal Their Fiction Writing Fixations, edited by Michael Martone and Susan Neville; and Letters to J. D. Salinger, edited by Chris Kubica.

His novel A Curable Romantic won the 2011 Sami Rohr Prize in Jewish Literature and was nominated for the 2012 Townsend Prize for Fiction.
