= 1894 Esperanto reform project =

Rejected reform of the Esperanto language

In 1894, L. L. Zamenhof, who was the original creator of the constructed language Esperanto, proposed a complete series of reforms to Esperanto (in other words, an Esperantido). It is notable as the only complete Esperantido to be authored by Zamenhof himself, and it was presented in response to various reforms that had been proposed by others since the language's publication in 1887. The project was eventually rejected by the language's speakers, and subsequently even by Zamenhof himself. Some of the proposed reforms were used in another constructed language, Ido, beginning in 1907.

== Background ==
Although Zamenhof's stated preference was to avoid any discussion of changes, he was put under considerable pressure, including financial, to respond to the diverse reforms proposed by others. Reluctantly he decided to present a reformed dialect himself and undertook to continue guiding the community, whether or not reforms were eventually agreed upon.

Although Zamenhof initially called his reform a systematic attempt to re-create the language in the light of more than six years of practical experience, scarcely any of the Esperanto community of the time accepted it as a whole. The majority voted to reject all changes. Zamenhof himself later rejected the whole project and referred to 1894 as "a wasted year". In 1907 he expressly refused permission to anyone wishing to re-publish the proposed reforms. In 1929 Johannes Dietterle cited this refusal as justification for omitting details of the reform project from his collection of Zamenhof's complete works, Originala Verkaro.

Some of the proposed reforms from 1894 such as replacing the -oj plural with -i, the removal of the diacritics and adjectival agreement were used in the language reform project Ido beginning in 1907, but these were not accepted by the Esperanto community either and Esperanto has changed relatively little since the publication of Zamenhof's Fundamento de Esperanto in 1905.

== Main proposed changes ==
1. The accented letters would disappear, together with most of their sounds.
2. The "c" would be pronounced like the old "ŝ"; "z" as the old "c", i.e. as /ts/.
3. The letters "ĝ" and "ĵ" would be usually replaced by "g" and "j" respectively.
4. The definite article would be eliminated.
5. The accusative would have the same form as the nominative and depend on position for clarity.
6. A plural noun would replace "-o" with "-i", instead of adding "-j".
7. Both adjectives and adverbs would take the ending "-e", be invariable, and depend on position for clarity.
8. The number of participles would be reduced from six to two.
9. The table of correlatives would be replaced with words or phrases taken from Romance languages.
10. The roots of the language would be changed to reflect the new alphabet.
11. The roots of the language not taken from Latin or Romance languages would be replaced by such.

== Alphabet ==
Esperanto 1894 alphabet
| Number | 1 | 2 | 3 | 4 | 5 | 6 | 8 | 8 | 9 | 10 | 11 | 12 | 13 | 14 | 15 | 16 | 17 | 18 | 19 | 20 | 21 | 22 |
|---|---|---|---|---|---|---|---|---|---|---|---|---|---|---|---|---|---|---|---|---|---|---|
| Upper case | A | B | C | D | E | F | G | H | I | J | K | L | M | N | O | P | R | S | T | U | V | Z |
| Lower case | a | b | c | d | e | f | g | h | i | j | k | l | m | n | o | p | r | s | t | u | v | z |
| IPA phoneme | a | b | ʃ | d | e | f | g | h | i | j | k | l | m | n | o | p | r | s | t | u | v | t͡s |

== Language samples for comparison ==
The Lord's Prayer in several Reformed versions and standard Esperanto for comparison:

| Standard Esperanto (1887) | Reformed Esperanto (1894) (early version) | Reformed Esperanto (1894) (with revised word roots) | Ido (1907) |
|---|---|---|---|
| Patro nia, kiu estas en la ĉielo, | Patro nue, kvu esten in cielo, | Patro nose, kvu esten in cielo, | Patro nia, qua esas en la cielo, |
| sankta estu Via nomo, | sankte estan tue nomo, | Sankte estan tue nomo. | tua nomo santigesez; |
| venu reĝeco Via, | venan regito tue, | Venan reksito tue, | tua regno advenez; |
| estu volo Via, | estan volo tue, | estan vulo tue, | tua volo facesez |
| kiel en la ĉielo, tiel ankaŭ sur la tero. | kom in cielo, sik anku sur tero. | kom in cielo, sik anku sur tero. | quale en la cielo tale anke sur la tero. |
| Panon nian ĉiutagan donu al ni hodiaŭ | Pano nue omnedie donan al nu hodiu | Pano nose omnudie donan al nos hodiu | Donez a ni cadie l'omnadia pano, |
| kaj pardonu al ni ŝuldojn niajn | e pardonan al nu debi nue, | e pardonan al nos debi nose, | e pardonez a ni nia ofensi, |
| kiel ni ankaŭ pardonas al niaj ŝuldantoj; | kom nu anku pardonen al nue debenti; | kom nos anku pardonen al nose debenti; | quale anke ni pardonas a nia ofensanti; |
| ne konduku nin en tenton, | ne kondukan nu in tento, | ne kondukan nos versu tento, | e ne duktez ni aden la tento, |
| sed liberigu nin de la malvera. | sed liberigan nu de malbono. | sed liberigan nos de malbono. | ma liberigez ni del malajo. |

== Sources ==
- https://web.archive.org/web/20160304080500/https://www.scribd.com/doc/288010765/Pri-Reformoj-en-Esperanto Pri Reformoj en Esperanto. Collection of the articles published by Zamenhof in 1894) (in Esperanto)
- Pri Reformoj en Esperanto (in Esperanto). The articles of L. Zamenhof 1894 from La Esperantista on archive.org.
- https://sites.google.com/site/esperanto1894/ (in Esperanto) Overview and list of changes made in Esperanto1894, incl. Vortaro of roots.
- Antaŭen al la laboro! Plena Verkaro de Zamenhof, kajero 3. Kyoto: Ludovikito, 1974. (in Esperanto)
- Washirei (2010). Esperanto 1894. Blogo por esperantologoj kaj ne nur!. (in Esperanto) Retrieved January 8, 2011.
