= Methyl blue =

Chemical compound

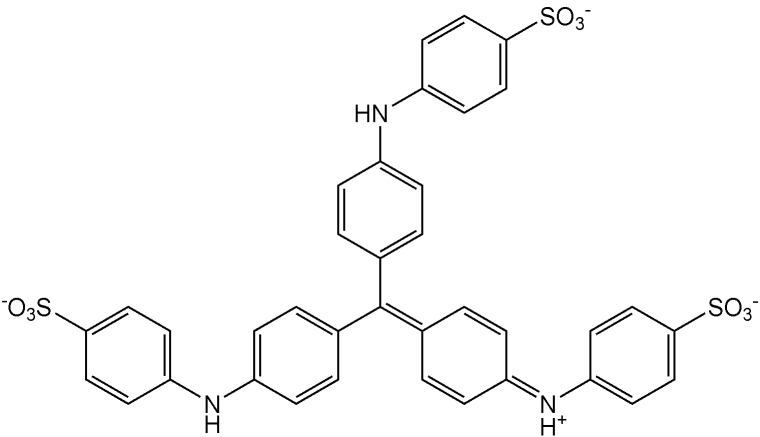

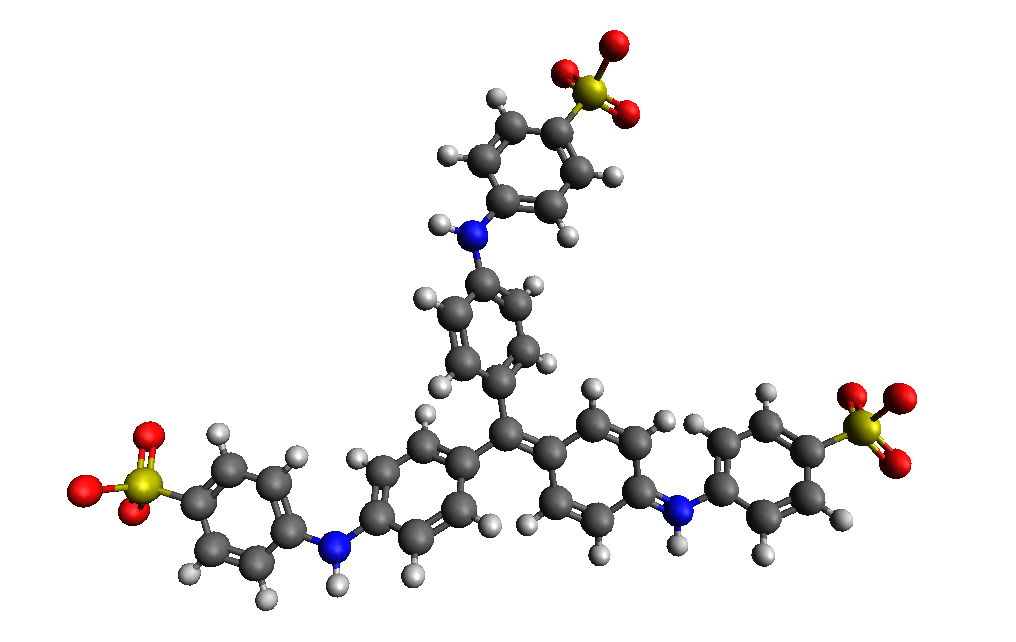

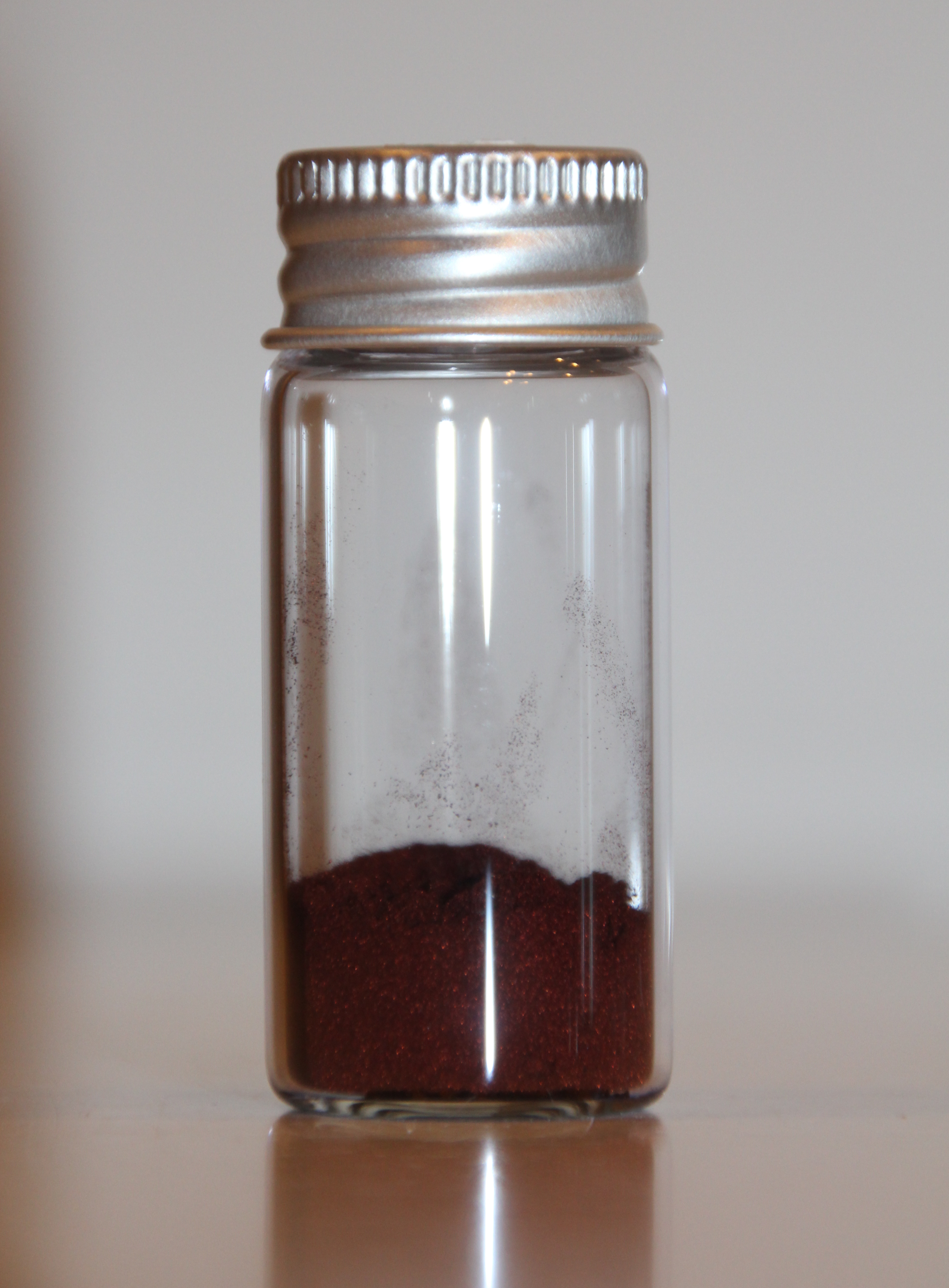
Solid methyl blue
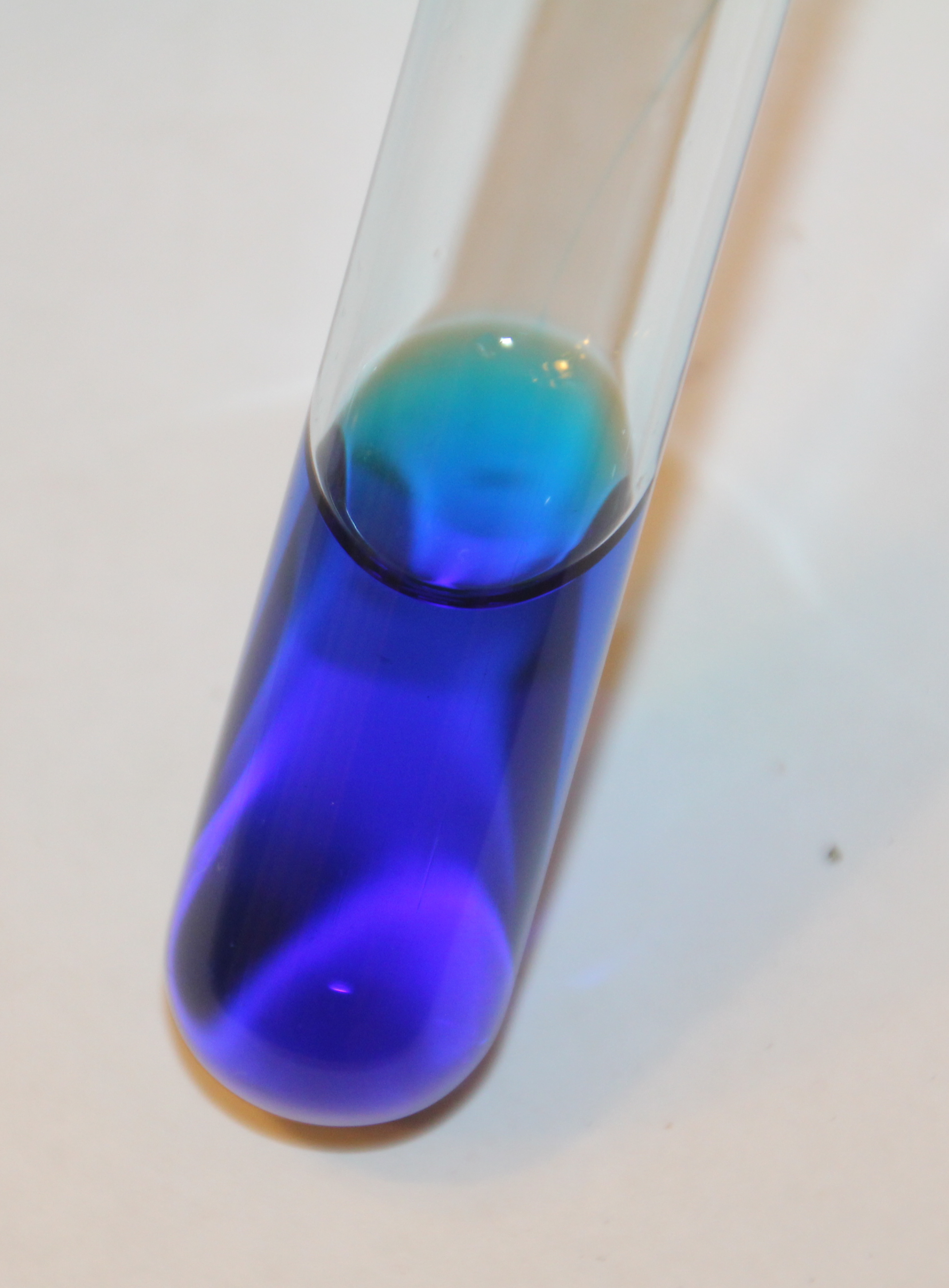
Methyl blue aqueous solution

Names
- Other names Cotton blue, Helvetia blue, Acid blue 93, C.I. 42780

Identifiers
CAS Number	28983-56-4
3D model (JSmol)	Interactive image
ChemSpider	8051359
ECHA InfoCard	100.044.852
PubChem CID	9875677
UNII	9ZI2A1BMBB
CompTox Dashboard (EPA)	DTXSID80214360 DTXSID90889705, DTXSID80214360
- InChI: InChI=1S/C37H29N3O9S3.2Na/c41-50(42,43)34-19-13-31(14-20-34)38-28-7-1-25(2-8-28)37(26-3-9-29(10-4-26)39-32-15-21-35(22-16-32)51(44,45)46)27-5-11-30(12-6-27)40-33-17-23-36(24-18-33)52(47,48)49;;/h1-24,38-39H,(H,41,42,43)(H,44,45,46)(H,47,48,49);;/q;2*+1/p-2 Key: MCPLVIGCWWTHFH-UHFFFAOYSA-L; InChI=1/C37H29N3O9S3.2Na/c41-50(42,43)34-19-13-31(14-20-34)38-28-7-1-25(2-8-28)37(26-3-9-29(10-4-26)39-32-15-21-35(22-16-32)51(44,45)46)27-5-11-30(12-6-27)40-33-17-23-36(24-18-33)52(47,48)49;;/h1-24,38-39H,(H,41,42,43)(H,44,45,46)(H,47,48,49);;/q;2*+1/p-2 Key: MCPLVIGCWWTHFH-NUQVWONBAI
- SMILES: [Na+].[Na+].[O-]S(=O)(=O)c1ccc(cc1)Nc2ccc(cc2)C(=C4C=CC(=[NH+]c3ccc(cc3)S([O-])(=O)=O)C=C4)c6ccc(Nc5ccc(cc5)S([O-])(=O)=O)cc6

Properties
Chemical formula	C_{37}H_{27}N_{3}Na_{2}O_{9}S_{3}
Molar mass	799.814 g/mol
Appearance	red solid
Solubility in water	Soluble in water, slightly soluble in ethanol

Hazards
NFPA 704 (fire diamond)	1 1 0
- Except where otherwise noted, data are given for materials in their standard state (at 25 °C [77 °F], 100 kPa). verify (what is ?) Infobox references

Methyl blue is a chemical compound with the molecular formula C_{37}H_{27}N_{3}Na_{2}O_{9}S_{3}. It is used as a stain in histology, and stains collagen blue in tissue sections. It can be used in some differential staining techniques such as Mallory's trichrome stain and Gömöri trichrome stain, and can be used to mediate electron transfer in microbial fuel cells. Fungal cell walls are also stained by methyl blue.

Methyl blue is also available in mixture with water blue, under name Aniline Blue WS, Aniline blue, China blue, or Soluble blue; and in a solution of phenol, glycerol, and lactic acid under the name Lactophenol cotton blue (LPCB), which is used for microscopic visualization of fungi.

== Chemistry ==
Methyl blue ([[4-[Bis[4-[(sulfophenyl)amino]phenyl]methylene]-2,5-cyclohexadien-1-ylidene]amino]-benzenesulfonic acid disodium salt) is distinctly different from methylene blue ([7-(dimethylamino)phenothiazin-3-ylidene]-dimethylazanium;chloride) in structure, function and uses, and must not be confused.

Its uses include staining histology samples for collagen, and for fungal structures.

== See also ==
- Potassium ferrocyanide
- Potassium ferricyanide
- Methylene blue
- Egyptian blue
- Han Purple
- Crystal violet
- Fluorescein
