= Wilhelm Ostwald =

German chemist and philosopher (1853–1932)

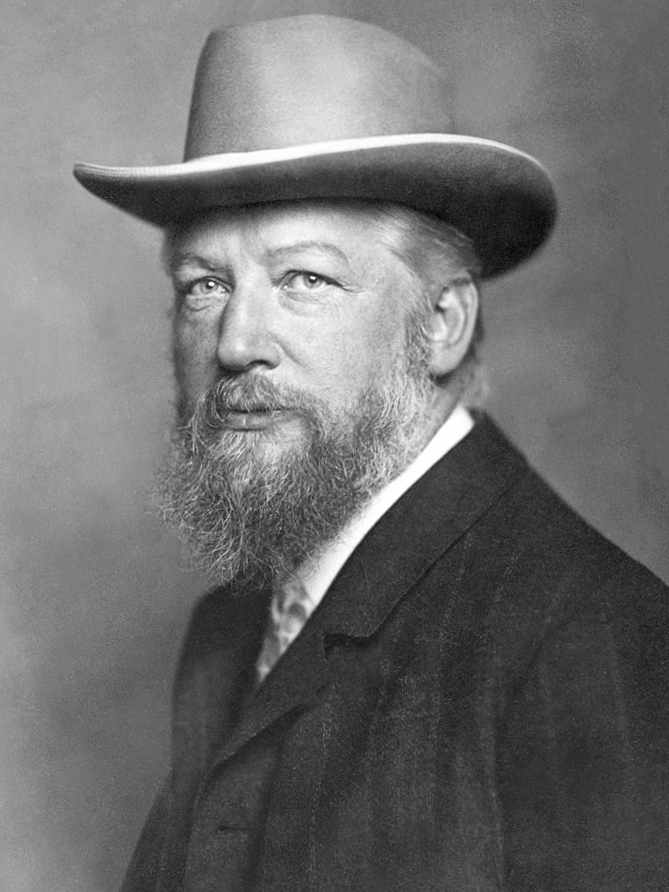
- Photograph of Ostwald c. 1913
- Born: Wilhelm Friedrich Ostwald; 2 September [O.S. 21 August] 1853; Riga, Governorate of Livonia, Russian Empire
- Died: 4 April 1932 (aged 78); Großbothen, Saxony, Weimar Republic
- Education: Imperial University of Dorpat
- Known for: See list: Founding of physical chemistry; Ostwald coefficient; Ostwald color system; Ostwald dilution law; Ostwald process; Ostwald ripening; Ostwald's rule; Ostwald viscometer; Ostwald–Freundlich equation; Ostwald–Folin pipette; Ostwald–de Waele relationship; Ostwald–Liesegang rings; Catalysis; Colligative properties; Energeticism; HSL and HSV; Coining the term mole
- Awards: Faraday Lectureship Prize (1904); Nobel Prize in Chemistry (1909); Wilhelm Exner Medal (1923)
- Scientific career
- Fields: Chemistry
- Workplaces: Imperial University of Dorpat; Riga Polytechnical Institution; Leipzig University
- Doctoral students: Arthur Amos Noyes; Georg Bredig; Paul Walden; Frederick G. Donnan; Louis Albrecht Kahlenberg; James Walker; Willis Rodney Whitney

Wilhelm Friedrich Ostwald (German: [ˈvɪlhɛlm ˈɔstvalt]; 2 September [O.S. 21 August] 1853 – 4 April 1932) was a Baltic German chemist and philosopher. Ostwald is credited with being one of the founders of the field of physical chemistry, with Jacobus Henricus van 't Hoff, Walther Nernst and Svante Arrhenius. He received the Nobel Prize in Chemistry in 1909 for his scientific contributions to the fields of catalysis, chemical equilibria and reaction velocities.

Following his 1906 retirement from academic life, Ostwald became much involved in philosophy, art, and politics. He made significant contributions to each of these fields. He has been described as a polymath.

== Early life and education ==
Ostwald was born ethnically Baltic German in Riga, Russian Empire (now Latvia) to master-cooper Gottfried Wilhelm Ostwald and Elisabeth Leuckel. He was the middle child of three, born after Eugen and before Gottfried. Ostwald developed an interest in science as a child and conducted experiments at his home, particularly related to fireworks and photography.

Ostwald entered the Imperial University of Dorpat (now the University of Tartu, Estonia) in 1872. He completed his Kandidatenschrift examinations there in 1875. During his time at Dorpat, Ostwald had significant exposure to the humanities, the arts, and philosophy, which became a focus of his endeavors after his 1906 retirement from academia.

== Academic career ==
Ostwald began his career as an independent unpaid investigator at the University of Dorpat in 1875. He worked in the laboratory of Carl Schmidt, along with his contemporary Johann Lemberg. Lemberg taught Ostwald many of the basics of the analysis of inorganic compounds and measurements of equilibria and chemical reaction rates. Lemberg also taught Ostwald the chemical basis of many geologic phenomena. These endeavors formed part of the subjects of Ostwald's later research efforts. In addition to his work in Carl Schmidt's laboratory, Ostwald also studied in the university's physics institute with Arthur von Oettingen.

Around 1877, still continuing his work as an unpaid investigator in the Chemistry Laboratory at the University of Dorpat, Ostwald became a paid assistant in the Physics Institute, after Oettingen's assistant moved to Riga. He also supported himself for a time by teaching mathematics and science at a Dorpat high school.

Ostwald was deeply interested in questions of chemical affinity and the reactions that formed chemical compounds. This was the central theoretical question facing chemists at the time. As part of his early work, Ostwald developed a three-dimensional affinity table that took into account the effects of temperature as well as the affinity constants of acids and bases. Ostwald also investigated mass action, electrochemistry, and chemical dynamics.

Ostwald completed his Magisterial degree at the University of Dorpat in 1877, enabling him to give lectures and charge for teaching. Ostwald published his doctoral dissertation at the University of Dorpat in 1878, with Carl Schmidt as his thesis advisor. His doctoral thesis was entitled Volumchemische und Optisch-Chemische Studien ("Volumetric and Optical-Chemical Studies"). In 1879, he became a paid assistant to Carl Schmidt.

In 1881, Ostwald became a Professor of Chemistry at the Riga Polytechnicum (now Riga Technical University). In 1887, he moved to Leipzig University where he became the world's first appointed specialized Professor of Physical Chemistry. Ostwald remained on the faculty at Leipzig University until his retirement in 1906.

He also served as the first "exchange professor" at Harvard University in 1904 and 1905.

During Ostwald's academic career, he had many research students who became accomplished scientists in their own right. These included future Nobel Laureates Svante Arrhenius, Jacobus Henricus van 't Hoff, and Walther Nernst. Other students included Arthur Noyes, Willis Rodney Whitney and Kikunae Ikeda. All of these students became notable for their contributions to physical chemistry.

In 1901, Albert Einstein applied for a research position in Ostwald's laboratory. This was four years before Einstein's publication on special relativity. Ostwald rejected Einstein's application, although later the two developed strong mutual respect. Subsequently, Ostwald nominated Einstein for the Nobel Prize in 1910 and again in 1913.

Following his 1906 retirement, Ostwald became active in philosophy, politics, and other humanities.

During the course of his academic career, Ostwald published more than 500 original research papers for the scientific literature and approximately 45 books.

== Scientific contributions ==
=== Nitric acid process ===
Ostwald invented a process for the inexpensive manufacture of nitric acid by oxidation of ammonia. He was awarded patents for this process. Ostwald's patent made use of a catalyst and described conditions under which the yield of nitric acid was near the theoretical limit. Aspects of the basic process had also been patented some 64 years earlier by Kuhlmann. Kuhlmann's process did not become industrially significant, likely due to the lack of an inexpensive source of ammonia. Shortly after Ostwald's finding, inexpensive ammonia became available as a result of Haber and Bosch's invention of a process for nitrogen fixing process (completed by 1911 or 1913) for ammonia synthesis. The combination of these two breakthroughs soon led to more economical and larger-scale production of fertilizers and explosives, of which Germany was in short supply during World War I. The process is often referred to as the Ostwald Process. The process remains in widespread use in contemporary times for manufacture of nitric acid.

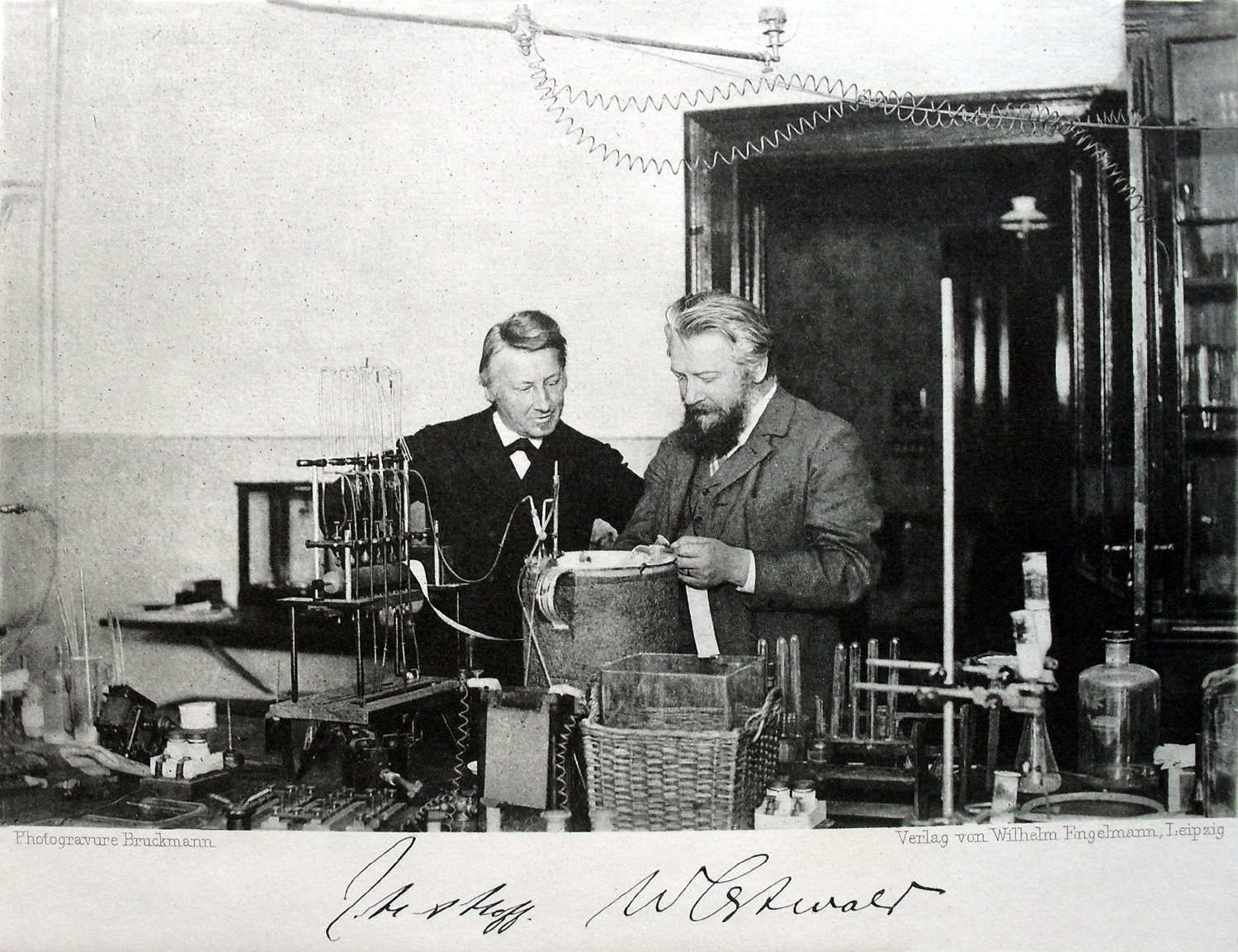
Jacobus van 't Hoff (left) and Wilhelm Ostwald

=== Ostwald's dilution law ===
Ostwald also conducted significant research on dilution theory leading to his conceptualization of the law of dilution which at times is referred to as "Ostwald's Dilution Law". This theory holds that the behavior of a weak electrolyte follows the principles of mass action, being extensively dissociated at infinite dilution. This characteristic of weak electrolytes can be observed experimentally, such as by electrochemical determinations.

=== Catalysis ===
Through his research on chemical reaction rates and velocities and his studies of acids and bases, Ostwald found that the concentration of acid or the concentration of base in a solution of certain chemical reactants can have a strong influence of the rate of chemical processes. He realized that this is manifestation of the concept of chemical catalysis first articulated by Berzelius. Ostwald articulated the idea that a catalyst is a substance that accelerates the rate of a chemical reaction without being a part of either the reactants or the products. Ostwald's advances in the understanding of chemical catalysis were widely applicable in biological processes such as enzymatic catalysis and also in many industrial processes. A catalyst is used in the nitric acid process that Ostwald invented.

=== Crystallization ===
Ostwald studied the crystallization behavior of solids, especially those solids that are capable of crystallizing in different forms, in the phenomenon known as polymorphism. He discovered that solids do not necessarily crystallize in their most thermodynamically stable form but instead sometimes crystallize preferentially in other forms dependent on the relative rates of crystallization of each polymorphic form. Ostwald found that the relative rates were dependent on the surface tension between the solid polymorph and the liquid form. Many common materials exhibit this type of behavior, including minerals and various organic compounds. This finding came to be known as Ostwald's rule.

Ostwald realized that solid or liquid solutions can continue to evolve over time. While the a non-thermodynamically preferred polymorph may crystallize first, more thermodynamically stable forms can continue to develop as the solution ages. Often this results in large crystals forming, since they are more thermodynamically stable than are large numbers of small crystals. This phenomenon came to be known as Ostwald Ripening and is observed in many situations. An everyday example is the gritty texture that ice cream develops as it ages. On a geologic timescale, many minerals exhibit Ostwald Ripening as their crystal forms evolve as the mineral ages.

Related to solubility and crystallization was Ostwald's finding that dissolution of a solid depends on the size of the crystal. When the crystals are small, typically less than a micron, the solubility of the solid in the solution phase is increased. Ostwald quantified this effect mathematically in a relationship that became known as the Ostwald-Freundlich equation. Ostwald first published his finding in 1900, and his mathematical equation was refined by German chemist Herbert Freundlich in 1909. This mathematical relationship also applies to the partial pressure of substance in the system. The Ostwald-Freundlich equation takes into account the surface tension of the particle in the system, in addition to curvature and temperature. The size dependence of solubility is sometimes utilized in the formulation of pharmaceuticals that have low solubility so as to enhance their uptake by the patient. The size dependence also has a role in Ostwald Ripening.

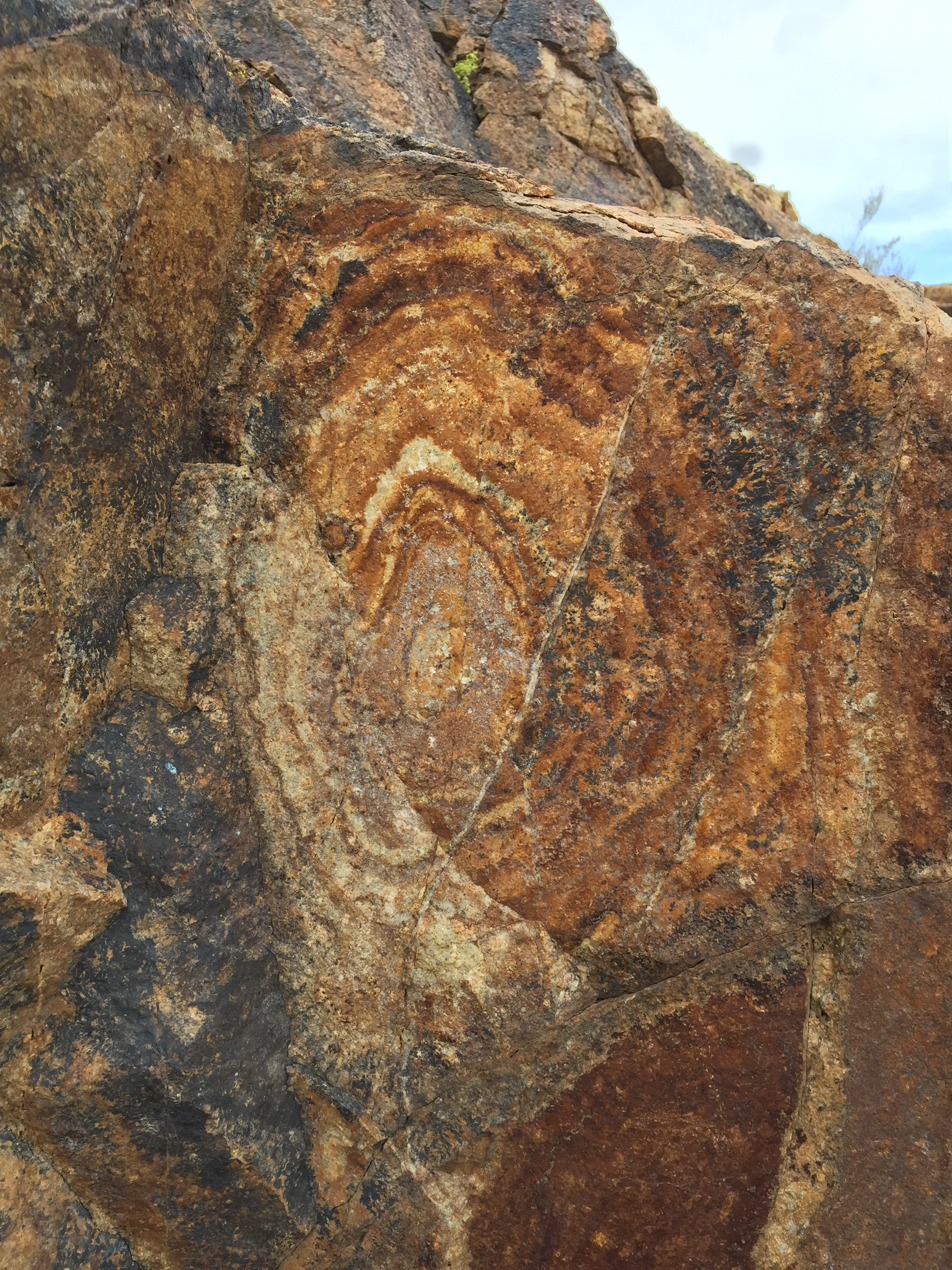
Liesegang rings at Saginaw Hill, Arizona, USA

Collaborating with German chemist Raphael E. Liesegang, Ostwald recognized that substances can crystallize in a periodic fashion wherein the crystallization behavior follows a spatial or temporal pattern. In certain circumstances, the result of this periodic crystallization behavior is easily visually observed, for example, in various geologic formations. Liesegang had previously investigated this phenomenon in specific laboratory experiments, showing his results to Ostwald. Ostwald then developed a mathematical model for the phenomenon that served to explain the observations and realized how widespread is the periodic crystallization behavior. These observations came to be known as Liesegang rings.

=== Atomic theory ===
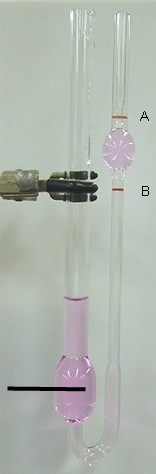
Ostwald viscometer

Ostwald introduced the word mole into the lexicon of chemistry around 1900. He defined one mole as the molecular weight of a substance in units of mass grams. The concept was linked to the ideal gas, according to Ostwald. Ironically, Ostwald's development of the mole concept was directly related to his theory of energeticism, in philosophical opposition to atomic theory, against which he (along with Ernst Mach) was one of the last holdouts. He explained in a conversation with Arnold Sommerfeld that he was convinced by Jean Perrin's experiments on Brownian motion.

In 1906 Ostwald was elected a member of the International Committee on Atomic Weights. As a consequence of World War I, this membership ended in 1917 and was not resumed after the war. The 1917 Annual Report of the committee ended with the unusual note: "Because of the European war the Committee has had much difficulty in the way of correspondence. The German member, Professor Ostwald, has not been heard from in connection with this report. Possibly the censorship of letters, either in Germany or en route, has led to a miscarriage".

=== Scientific measurements ===
As part of Ostwald's investigations in to chemical equilibria, chemical affinity, and acid-base interactions, he recognized that many established analytical methods disturb the chemical systems under investigation. He therefore turned to physical measurements as surrogate methods to understand these important basic phenomena. One such physical measurement is the measurement of the viscosity, or resistance to flow, of a liquid. Ostwald invented a device for this purpose consisting of bulbs that act as reservoirs for a liquid with a capillary, or thin tube, in between the reservoirs. The time that it takes for the liquid to flow through the capillary from one reservoir to the other is an indication of the viscosity of the liquid. Using a reference solution, the viscosity of the liquid can be quantified. Ostwald typically used this device to study the behavior of solutes in water solutions. These devices came to be known as Ostwald viscometers and are in widespread use in contemporary times for research and quality control purposes.

Ostwald designed a pipette that could be used to transfer and measure liquids, especially serous fluids. This design was later improved by Otto Folin. This type of pipette has a bulb at the lower end as a particular design feature. It became known as the Ostwald-Folin pipette and is widely used in contemporary times.

=== Color science ===
Following his 1906 retirement from academia, Ostwald became interested in the systematization of colors, which could be useful both scientifically and in the arts. He published The Color Primer and also The Color Atlas during the period of 1916–8. These publications established relationships between the various visual colors.

The Color Primer,
page 33

The Color Primer,
page 44

The Color Primer,
page 50

The Color Primer,
page 56

Ostwald represented these as a three dimensional representation of color space that is a topological solid consisting of two cones. One apex of the cone is pure white while the other is pure black. The eight primary colors are represented along the circumference or curved surfaces of the two cones. In this representation, each color is a mixture of white, black, and the eight primary colors. In this way, there are three degrees of freedom that represent each color.

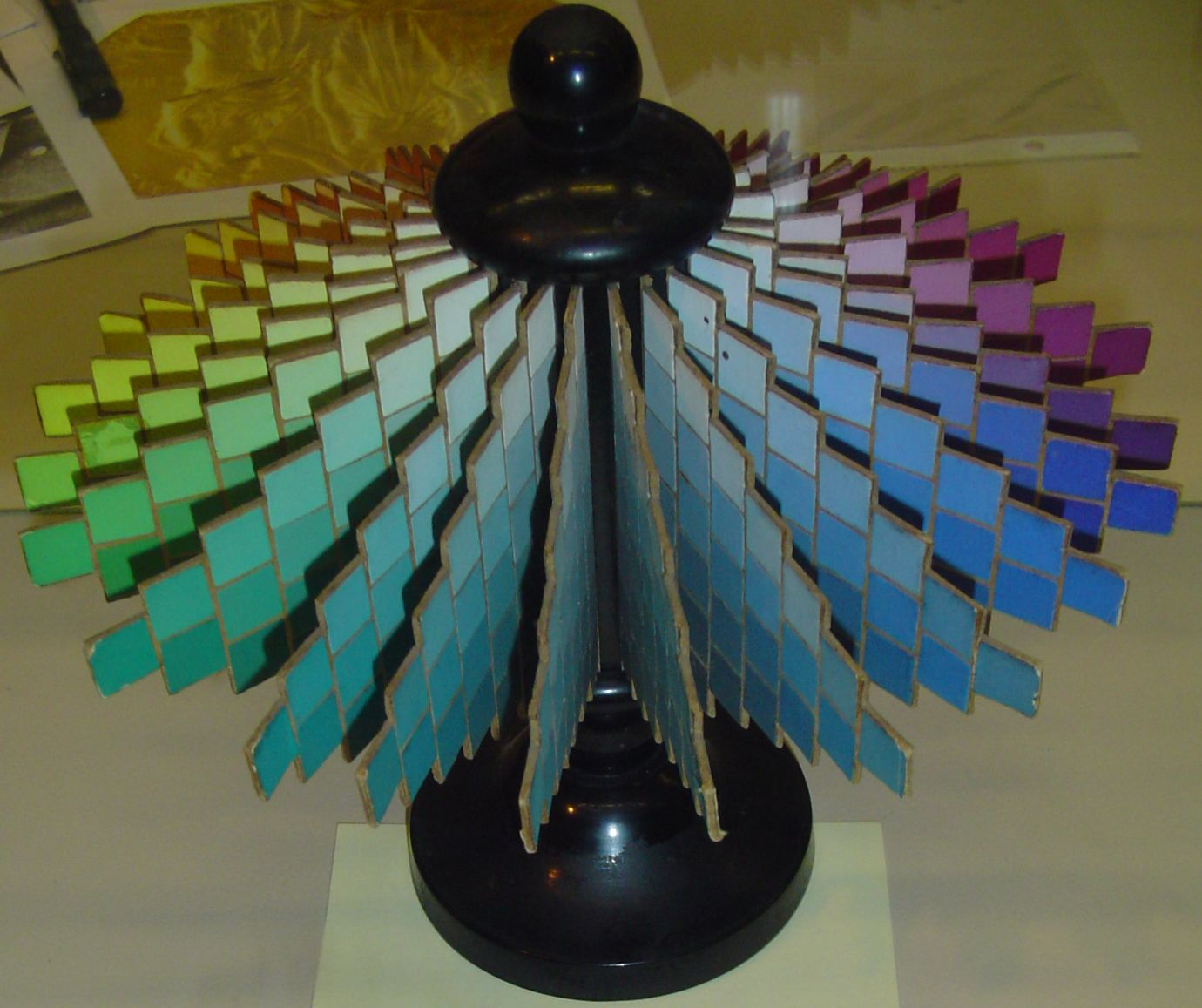
Ostwald color solid

This representation of colors was an important early step toward their systematization, replacing color perception by the human eye with an objective system. Much of Ostwald's work on systematization of color was done in collaboration with Deutscher Werkbund, which was an association of painters and architects.

== Scholarly journals and societies ==
In 1887, Ostwald founded the peer-reviewed scientific journal Zeitschrift für Physikalische Chemie, specializing in original research in the field of physical chemistry. He served as its editor-in-chief until 1922. In 1894, Ostwald formed the German Electrochemical Society which ultimately became the Deutsche Bunsen-Gesellschaft für angewandte physikalische Chemie [German Bunsen-Society for Applied Physical Chemistry]. He created the journal Klassiker der exakten Wissenschaften in 1889, of which more than 250 volumes have been published.

As part of his interest in philosophy, in 1902 Ostwald started the journal Annalen der Naturphilosophie (Annales of Natural Philosophy), today remembered also for having published in 1921 for the first time, in german, the then unknown Wittgenstein's Tractatus logico-philosophicus.

In 1927, he initiated the journal Die Farbe (Colour).

Ostwald was one of the directors of the Die Brücke institute in Munich, and he played a role in its founding in 1911. The institute was sponsored, significantly, from Ostwald's Nobel Prize money. Through the institute, Ostwald's intention was to develop a standardized system for scholarly publications. In 1911, Ostwald founded the Association of Chemical Societies, which sought to organize and improve the efficiency of various chemical societies. The association is an example of a scientific society. Ostwald served as the first president of the Association of Chemical Societies.

== Scholarly contributions to humanities and politics ==
In addition to his research in chemistry, Wilhelm Ostwald was productive in a broad range of fields. His published work, which includes numerous philosophical writings, contains about forty thousand pages. Ostwald was also engaged in the peace movement of Berta von Suttner.

Among his other interests, Ostwald was a painter who made his own pigments. He left more than 1,000 paintings along with 3,000 pastels and color studies. For Ostwald, science and the arts were mutually supportive areas of engagement.

"Poetry, music and painting have given me refreshment and new courage, when exhausted by scientific work I have been obliged to lay my tools aside."–Ostwald

Ostwald regarded science and the arts as having a common aim, that of "coping with the infinite diversity of appearances through the formation of appropriate concepts"... Towards this aim, science builds "intellectual ideas; art constructs visual ones."

Ostwald developed a strong interest in color theory in the later decades of his life. He wrote several publications in the field, such as his Malerbriefe (Letters to a Painter, 1904) and Die Farbenfibel (The Color Primer, 1916). His work in color theory was influenced by that of Albert Henry Munsell, and in turn influenced Piet Mondrian and other members of De Stijl and Paul Klee and other members of the Bauhaus school. Ostwald's theories also influenced Americans Faber Birren and Egbert Jacobson.

He was also interested in the international language movement, first learning Esperanto, then later supporting Ido. He was a member of a Committee of the Delegation for the Adoption of an International Auxiliary Language. Ostwald donated half the proceedings of his 1909 Nobel prize to the Ido movement, funding the Ido magazine Progreso which he had proposed in 1908. Ostwald later went on to create his own language Weltdeutsch in a period of extreme nationalism during the First World War.

One of Ostwald's continuing interests was unification through systematization. In particular, Ostwald perceived that energy efficiency was a unifying theme in all facets of society and culture. In political matters, Ostwald's interest in energy efficiency extended to such political matters as the need for organization of labor.

Ostwald's interest in unification through systematization led to his adaptation of the philosophy of Monism. Initially, Monism was liberal, pacifist, and international, seeking in science a basis of values to support social and political reforms. Ostwald himself developed a system of ethics based on science, around the core idea that one should "not waste energy, but convert it into its most useful form."

in 1911, Ostwald became President of the Deutscher Monistenbund (Monist Association), founded by Ernst Haeckel. Ostwald (and other Monists) promoted eugenics and euthanasia, but only as voluntary choices with the intention of preventing suffering. Monist promotion of such ideas is suggested to have indirectly facilitated acceptance of the later Social Darwinism of the National Socialists. Ostwald died before the Nazis adopted and enforced the use of eugenics and euthanasia as involuntary government policies, to support their racist ideological positions. Ostwald's Monism also influenced Carl G. Jung's identification of psychological types.

== Honours and awards ==
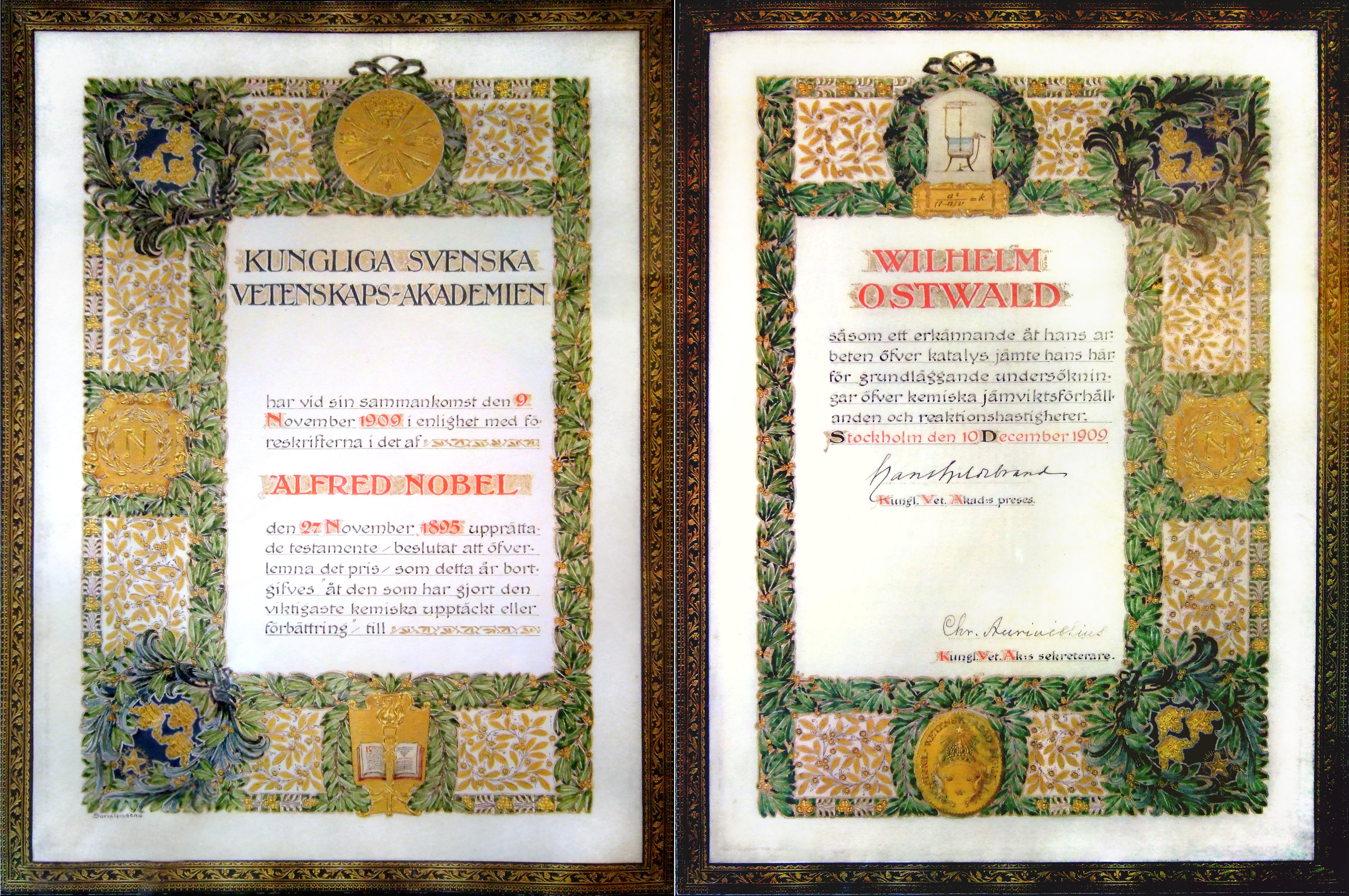
Nobel Prize certificate for Wilhelm Ostwald

Ostwald, during his time in Leipzig was elected to honorary membership of the Manchester Literary and Philosophical Society, in 1894. He was elected an International Honorary Member of the American Academy of Arts and Sciences in 1905 and an International Member of the United States National Academy of Sciences in 1906. He received the 1909 Nobel Prize for Chemistry for his contributions to understanding catalysis and for his investigations of the fundamental principles underlying chemical equilibria and reaction rates. He was nominated for the Nobel Prize 20 times, beginning in 1904, and submitted nine nominations for other scientists for the Nobel Prize following his own award. This included two nominations of Albert Einstein. Ostwald donated more than US$40,000 of his Nobel Prize award money to advance the cause of the Ido language. He was elected an International Member of the American Philosophical Society in 1912.

In 1923, Ostwald was awarded the Wilhelm Exner Medal, which recognized the economic impact of Ostwald's scientific contributions.

In 1904 he was elected a foreign member of the Royal Netherlands Academy of Arts and Sciences. He became an honorary member of scientific societies in Germany, Sweden, Norway, the Netherlands, Russia, Great Britain, and the United States. Ostwald received honorary doctorates from various universities in Germany, the United Kingdom, and the United States. In 1899, he was made a Geheimrat by the King of Saxony, which by that time was a recognition of Ostwald's scholarly contributions.

There is a Wilhelm Ostwald Park and Museum in Grimma, Germany, at the site of Ostwald's vacation home. This institution also houses many of Ostwald's scholarly works.

Ostwald crater, which is on the far side of the Earth's moon, was named in honor of Wilhelm Ostwald.

== Personal life ==
On 24 April 1880 Ostwald married Helene von Reyher (1854–1946), with whom he had five children. These were: Grete, (1882–1960) born in Riga and died in Großbothen; Wolfgang (1883–1943) born 1883 in Riga and died in Dresden; Elisabeth (1884– 1968) born in Riga and died in Großbothen; Walter (1886–1958) born in Riga and died in Freiburg im Breisgau; and Carl Otto (1890–1958) born in Leipzig and died in Leipzig. Wolfgang Ostwald became a notable scientist in the area of colloid chemistry.

Ostwald was initiated to the Scottish Rite Masonry and became Grand Master of the Grand Lodge "Zur Aufgehenden Sonne" in Bayreuth.

In 1887, he moved to Leipzig where he worked for the rest of his life. At the time of his retirement, he moved to a country estate near Groβbothen, Saxony, which he named "Landhaus Energie". He lived at the country estate for most of the remainder of his life.

On his religious views, Ostwald was an atheist. Ostwald died in a hospital in Leipzig on 4 April 1932, and was buried at his country estate in Großbothen, near Leipzig

== In fiction ==
Ostwald appears as a character in Joseph Skibell's 2010 novel, A Curable Romantic.

He is also mentioned in Italo Svevo's 1923 novel, La coscienza di Zeno, translated as Zeno's Conscience.

== Representative publications ==
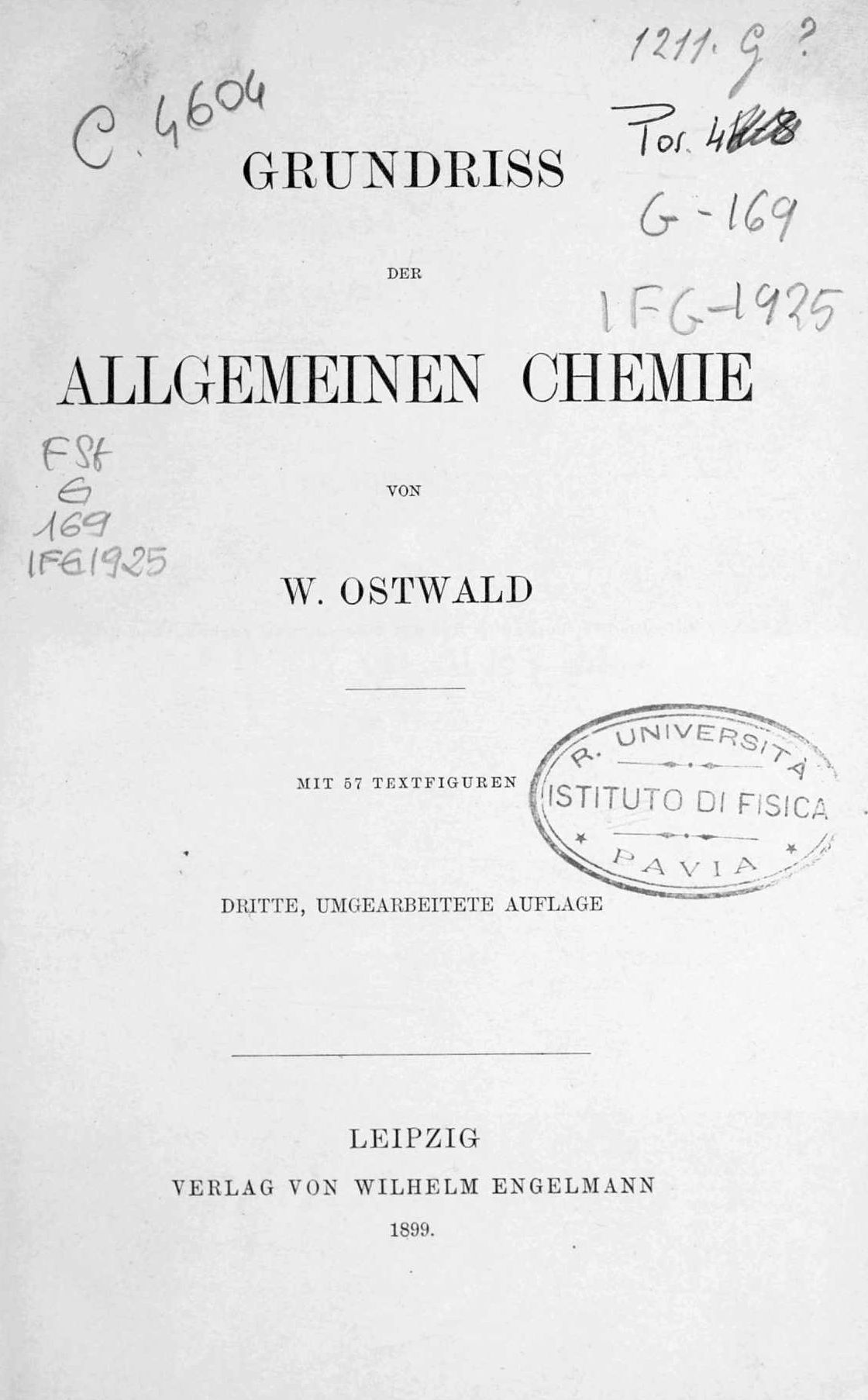
Grundriss der allgemeinen Chemie, 1899

- Grundriss der allgemeinen Chemie (in German). Leipzig: Wilhelm Engelmann. 1899.
- Ostwald, W. (1906). Process of manufacturing nitric acid. Patent.
- Ostwald, W. (1909). Energetische Grundlagen der Kulturwissenschaft (1st ed.). Leipzig: Leipzig, W. Klinkhardt.
- Couturat, L.; Jespersen O.; Lorenz R.; Ostwald W.; Pfaundler L. (1910). International language and science: Considerations on the introduction of an international language into science. London: Constable and Company Limited.
- Entwicklung der Elektrochemie (in French). Paris: Alcan. 1912.
- Ostwald, W. (1917). Grundriss der allgemeinen Chemie (5th ed.). Dresden: Steinkopff.

== Books ==
- Lehrbuch der allgemeinen Chemie. Leipzig: W. Engelmann, 1896–1903. (2 vols.)
- Leitlinien der Chemie: 7 gemeinverständliche Vorträge aus der Geschichte der Chemie. Leipzig : Akad. Verl.-Ges., 1906. Digital edition of the University and State Library Düsseldorf.
- The Scientific foundations of analytical chemistry London: Macmillan, 1908. OCLC 35430378
- Colour science, London: Winsor & Newton, 1933. OCLC 499690961
- The color primer: A basic treatise on the color system of Wilhelm Ostwald, New York, N.Y.: Van Nostrand Reinhold, 1969. OCLC 760593331
- Electrochemistry: History and theory : Elektrochemie: Ihre Geschichte und Lehre. New Delhi: Amerind Publishing Co. 1980. OCLC 702695546
- Lebenslinien. Eine Selbstbiographie von Wilhelm Ostwald. Zweiter Teil, Leipzig 1887–1905 (3 vols). (Klasing & Co., g.m.b.H., Berlin 1927.) Translated as Wilhelm Ostwald: The Autobiography by Robert Jack. Springer, 2017.

== See also ==
- Colligative properties
- Electrode potential
- Energeticism
- List of Baltic Germans § Scientists
- Timeline of hydrogen technologies
- Wilhelm Ostwald Institute
