= Rungiah =

Indian botanical artist

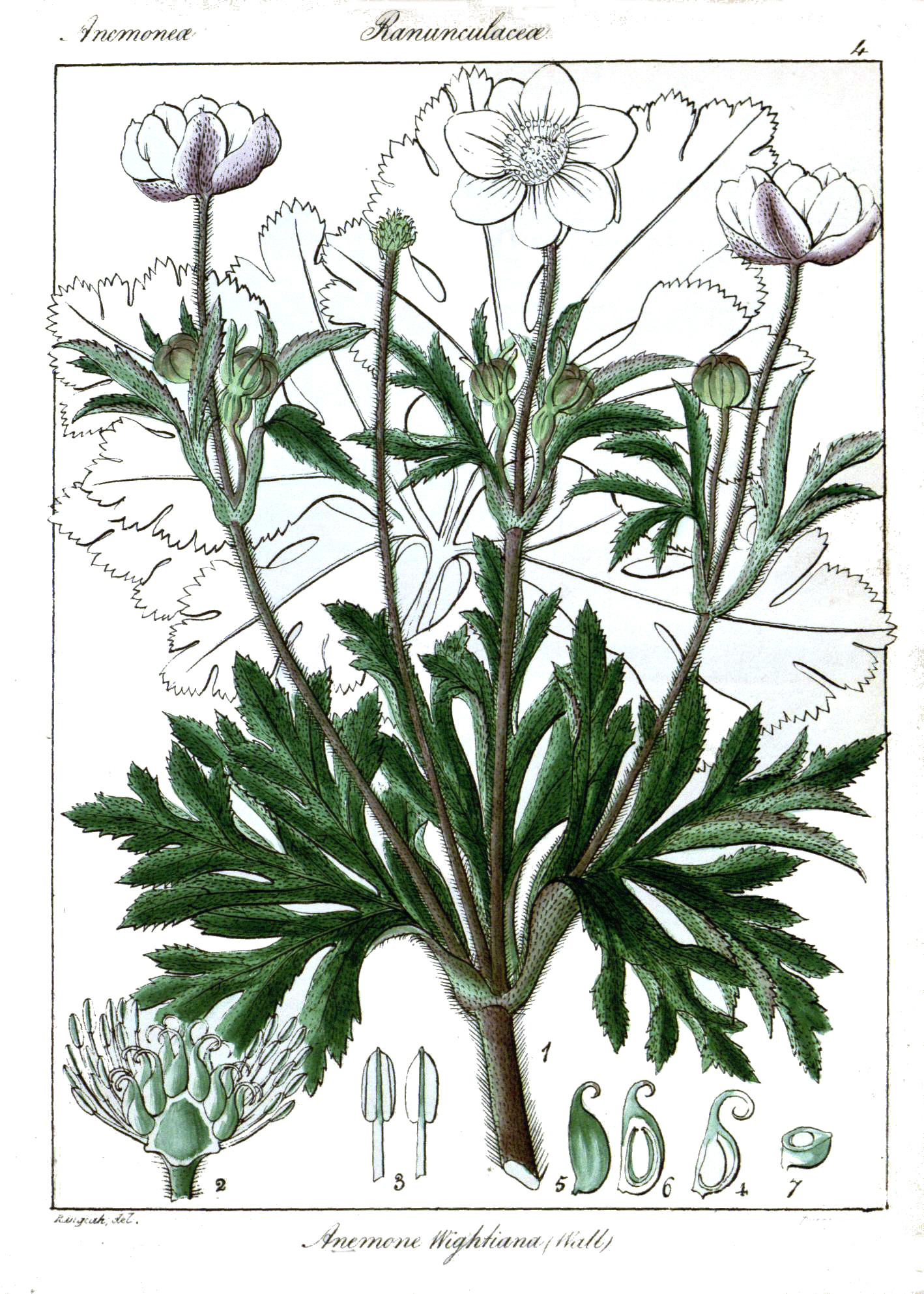
Anemone wightiana

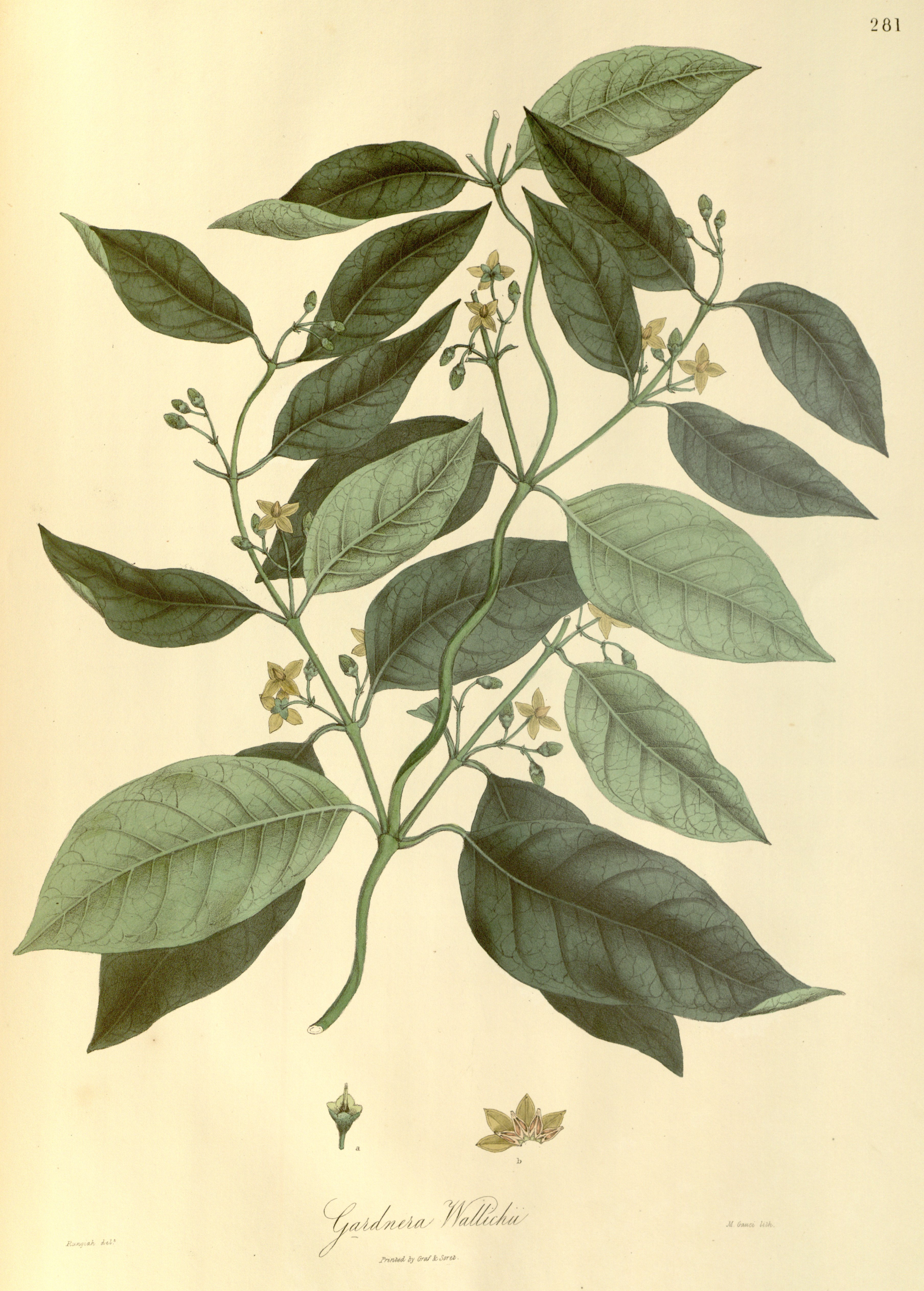
Gardneria ovata from Nathaniel Wallich's 'Plantae Asiaticae Rariores' (1832)

Rungiah aka Rungia or Rungia Raju was a 19th-century Indian botanical illustrator, noted for producing a large number of images for Robert Wight's books on Indian flora. The Raju family were painters of the Kshatriya caste of Tanjore, and were originally from the Telugu-speaking region in the state of Andhra Pradesh.

Robert Wight took up a post in India in 1819 as first assistant surgeon and later full surgeon of the 33rd Regiment of Bengal Native Infantry in the East India Company's service. His interest in botany was evident so that he was transferred to Madras and placed in charge of the Botanic Gardens there, later taking up the position of naturalist to the East India Company. Wight commissioned the artist Rungiah from about 1826 to around 1845, after which he used another illustrator, Govindoo, likely from the same ethnic origins. Wight greatly valued the artists' talents, and, unusually for the time, credited them in the publications of their work, which included the six-volume 'Icones Plantarum Indiae Orientalis' (1838–53), two hand-coloured, two-volume works, the 'Illustrations of Indian Botany' (1838–50) and 'Spicilegium Neilgherrense' (1845–51). Remarkably 711 of their original plates have survived in the library of the Royal Botanic Garden Edinburgh.

Nathaniel Wallich also published illustrations by Rungiah (see Gardneria ovata on this page) (in 1832, he named the genus Rungia in Acanthaceae, which is not in Rungiah's honour, but after Friedlieb Ferdinand Runge (1794-1867), a German professor of analytical chemistry at the University of Breslau).
