= Azan =

Azan may refer to:

== People ==
- Ivan Asen I of Bulgaria r. 1189–1196 or his sons
- Ivan Asen II of Bulgaria r. 1218–1241
- Azan (Star Trek), Star Trek character
- Azan (mythology), character in Greek mythology
- Azan, nickname of American Twitch streamer and political commentator Hasan Piker (born 1991)
- Richard Azan (born 1964), Jamaican politician

== Other ==
- Adhan, also written as Azan, the Islamic call to prayer
- Aazaan, a 2011 Indian Hindi-language action spy film
- Azaan Akbar, fictional Indian Army sniper and R&AW agent in the 2017 film Tiger Zinda Hai
- Azan (Az: Azocarmine and An: Aniline Blue WS), used in histology to distinguish cells from the extracellular matrix
