= Water blue =

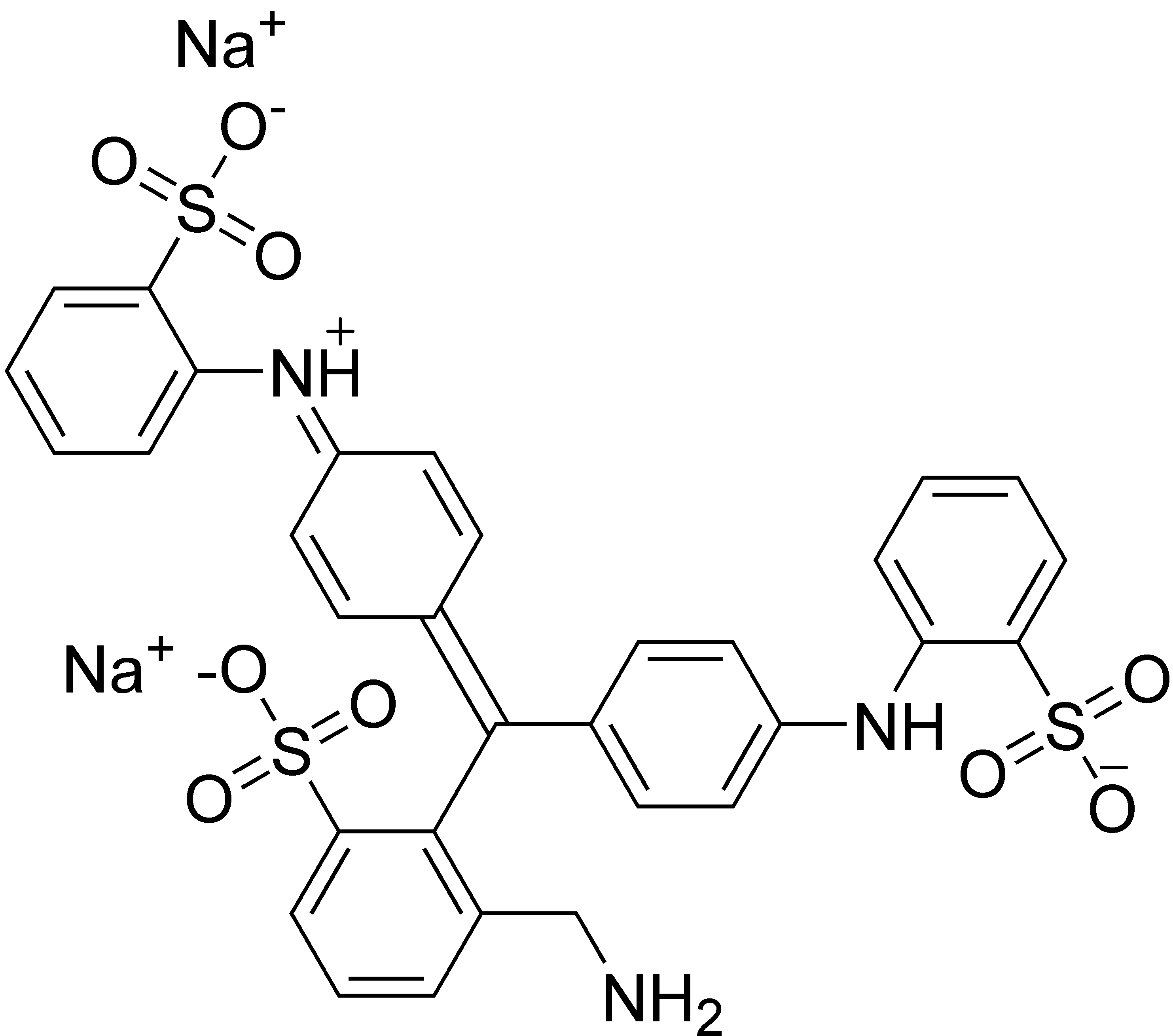

Identifiers
CAS Number	28631-66-5
3D model (JSmol)	Interactive image
ChemSpider	21173243
ECHA InfoCard	100.044.634
EC Number	249-113-9
PubChem CID	139030972
UNII	44D829LK4D
CompTox Dashboard (EPA)	DTXSID9044904
- InChI: InChI=1S/C32H27N3O9S3.2Na/c33-20-26-25(6-5-11-29(26)45(36,37)38)32(21-12-16-23(17-13-21)34-27-7-1-3-9-30(27)46(39,40)41)22-14-18-24(19-15-22)35-28-8-2-4-10-31(28)47(42,43)44;;/h1-19,34H,20,33H2,(H,36,37,38)(H,39,40,41)(H,42,43,44);;/q;2*+1/p-2 Key: WJHQBPPQVMBLSW-UHFFFAOYSA-L
- SMILES: [H+].c1ccc(c(c1)Nc2ccc(cc2)C(=C3C=CC(=Nc4ccccc4S(=O)(=O)[O-])C=C3)c5cccc(c5CN)S(=O)(=O)[O-])S(=O)(=O)[O-].[Na+].[Na+]

Properties
Chemical formula	C_{32}H_{25}N_{3}O_{9}S_{3}Na_{2}
Molar mass	737.72374 g/mol

Hazards
- GHS labelling
Pictograms	(GHS07: Exclamation mark)
Signal word	Warning
Hazard statements	H315, H317, H319, H335
- Except where otherwise noted, data are given for materials in their standard state (at 25 °C [77 °F], 100 kPa). verify (what is ?) Infobox references

Water blue, also known as aniline blue, Acid blue 22, Soluble Blue 3M, Marine Blue V, or C.I. 42755, is a chemical compound used as a stain in histology. Water supply blue stains collagen blue in tissue sections. It is soluble in water and slightly soluble in ethanol.

Water blue is also available in mixture with methyl blue, under the names Aniline Blue WS, Aniline blue, China blue, or Soluble blue.

It can be used in the Mallory's trichrome stain of connective tissue and Gömöri trichrome stain of muscle tissue. It is used in differential staining.

Water blue was first discovered in 1834 when German chemist Friedlieb Ferdinand Runge isolated it from coal tar using chloride of lime. Runge named the dye kyanol or cyanol. Water blue was the first coal tar dye ever to be discovered.

== See also ==
- RAL 5021 Water blue
