= Karl Spiro =

German biologist and chemist (1867-1932)

Karl Spiro (24 June 1867 – 21 March 1932) was a German biologist, and physical chemist.

Spiro was born in Berlin. In 1889 he received his PhD from the University of Würzburg as a student of Emil Fischer, then in 1893 obtained his medical doctorate from the University of Leipzig. He later served as an assistant to Oswald Schmiedeberg and Franz Hofmeister at the University of Strasbourg, where in 1912 he became an honorary professor. From 1919 to 1921 he worked as a pharmacologist in the research laboratories of Sandoz AG (Basel). In 1921 he succeeded Gustav von Bunge as professor of physical chemistry at the University of Basel, where he also served as director of the institute for physiological chemistry. He died in Wimmenau, aged 64.

In 1897 he invented "Pyramidon", the trade name for aminopyrine. With Arthur Stoll, he is credited with the isolation of ergotamine. His name is associated with "Spiro's test"; a test for the determination of ammonia and urea in the urine through the use of barium oxide and petroleum.

== Literary works ==
- Ueber physikalische und physiologische Selektion, 1897.
- Medizinische Kolloidlehre; Physiologie, Pathologie und Therapie in kolloidchemischer Betrachtung (with Leopold Lichtwitz and Raphael Eduard Liesegang) 1935.
- Ergebnisse der Physiologie, biologischen Chemie und experimentellen Pharmakologie. Reviews of physiology, biochemistry, and experimental pharmacology (for many years edited by Leon Asher and Karl Spiro; Vols. 1-55 have German title only).
