= Hantz reactions =

Class of precipitation reactions in gels

Hantz reactions are a class of pattern-forming precipitation reactions in gels implementing a reaction–diffusion system. The precipitation patterns are forming as a reaction of two electrolytes: a highly concentrated "outer" one diffuses into a hydrogel, while the "inner" one is dissolved in the gel itself. The colloidal precipitate which builds up the patterns is trapped by the gel and kept at the location where it is formed, similar to Liesegang rings.

The first representative of this class of reactions was the NaOH (outer electrolyte)+CuCl_{2} (inner electrolyte). Later the NaOH+AgNO_{3}, the CuCl_{2}+K_{3}[Fe(CN)_{6}], the NaOH+AlCl_{3}, and the NH_{3}+AgNO_{3} reactions in several hydrogels have also proved to show similar behavior. Precipitate patterns forming in these reactions are exceptionally rich. Besides the macroscopic shapes like layered structures, helices and cardioids, regular sheets of colloidal precipitate may also emerge with a periodicity even less than 20 micrometers (microscopic patterns).

== Macroscopic patterns ==
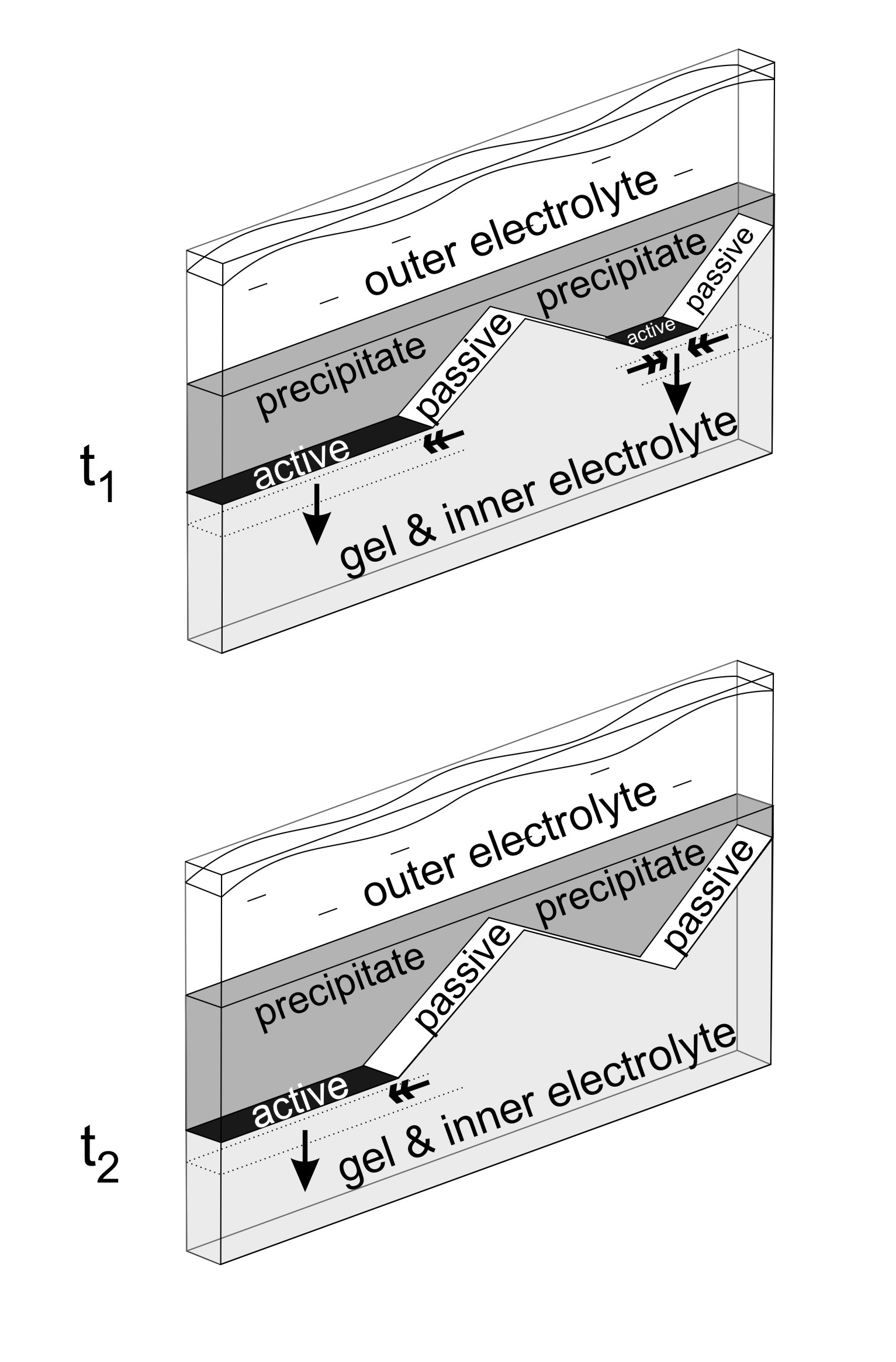
Sequence of formation of macroscopic patterns. Two consecutive snapshots are shown. Dark grey represents the precipitate, light grey the hydrogel with the inner electrolyte, white the semipermeable "passive", while black the traveling "active" borders. Simple arrows indicate the growing (traveling) direction of the active precipitate borders, while double arrows their directions of shrinking.

The arrangement that best shows the sequence of events leading to the formation of macroscopic patters is the one in which the outer electrolyte penetrates in a thin gel sheet located between two glass plates. In this case, the diffusion front has a quasi-one-dimensional shape. If there are some impurities or obstacles in the gel, the precipitation may cease at these points, and the traveling precipitation front following the diffusion front will split. As the broken precipitation front advances, its active segments are getting shorter, resulting in triangle-like regions free of precipitate behind the front. The reason why the precipitation temporarily or permanently stops in these regions is that the oblique, passive edges of the precipitate act as a semipermeable membrane, blocking the diffusion of the outer electrolyte.

The mechanism behind the regression of the active front segments is not fully understood. It is believed that a diffusive intermediate compound forms at the active segments having reduced concentration at the sides, and a critical concentration is required for the precipitation to occur.

When the outer electrolyte is poured onto the top of a gel column in a glass tube, the diffusion front takes roughly the form of a disk. In this case, the precipitation fronts involved in pattern formation can perform more complicated motions, leading to more complex patterns that depend on the outer and inner electrolyte concentration. These include the formation of multi-armed helices, intermingled cardioids, Voronoi tessellations, so-called target patterns and other, even more complex shapes.

== Microscopic patterns ==
In certain conditions, for example when the cation of the inner electrolyte is Cu^{2+} or Ag^{2+}, regular sheets consisting of colloidal grains are formed. This phenomenon is especially striking when the reactions run in poly(vinyl)alcohol gels, and the speed of the precipitation front falls below about 0.3 μm/s. The finest microscopic patterns have been observed in the NaOH+AgNO_{3} reactions, where the periodicity dropped below 10 μm. The chemical mechanism of this pattern formation is not fully understood, but computer simulations based on phase separation described by the Cahn–Hilliard equation with a moving source front exhibit the most important properties of the building of the microscopic patterns. Defects may also be present in the regular microscopic sheets, which can even interact during the front propagation. These microscopic patterns have raised interest in different fields of micro and nanotechnology as well

== See also ==
- Diffusion-controlled reaction
- Turing pattern
- Belousov–Zhabotinsky reaction
