= Leopold Lichtwitz =

Leopold Lichtwitz (9 December 1876 in Ohlau – 16 March 1943 in New Rochelle, New York) was a German-American internist.

He studied medicine in several German universities, receiving his doctorate in 1901 from the University of Leipzig. In 1906/07 he studied chemistry at Leipzig, and during the following year, obtained his habilitation for medicine at the University of Göttingen. In 1910 he was named head of the medical polyclinic in Göttingen, where in 1913 he became an associate professor.

In 1916 he was appointed director of the department of internal medicine at the municipal hospital in Altona. In 1931 he relocated to Berlin as director of the Rudolf Virchow Hospital. Because of his Jewish heritage, he was dismissed from his post at the hospital by the Nazi regime in 1933. He then emigrated to the United States, where he subsequently found employment as director of the department of internal medicine at Montefiore Hospital in New York. In New York, he was also a professor at Columbia University.

The "Leopold-Lichtwitz-Medaille" is an award offered by the Deutschen Gesellschaft für Innere Medizin (DGIM) to those who distinguish themselves through their work and commitment in the interests of internal medicine.

== Published works ==
- Über die Bildung der Harn-und Gallensteine, 1914.
- Klinische chemie, 1918.
- Die Praxis der Nierenkrankheiten, 1921.
- Medizinische Kolloidlehre: Physiologie, Pathologie und Therapie in kolloidchemischer Betrachtung, (Part 1, with Raphael Eduard Liesegang and Karl Spiro), 1935.
- Pathologie der funktionen und regulationen, 1936.
- "Functional pathology", 1941.
- "Nephritis", 1942.
- "Pathology and therapy of rheumatic fever", 1944.
