= Aniline Blue WS =

Chemical compound

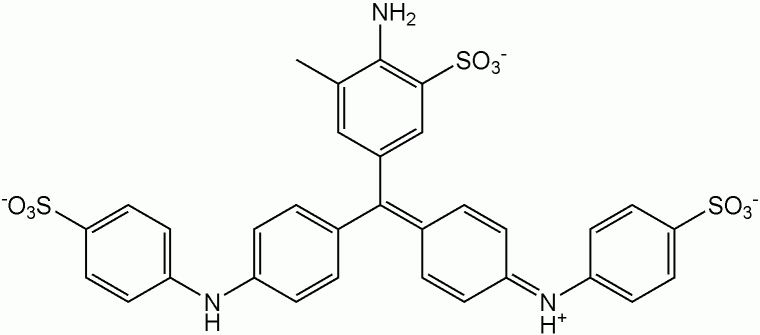
Water blue

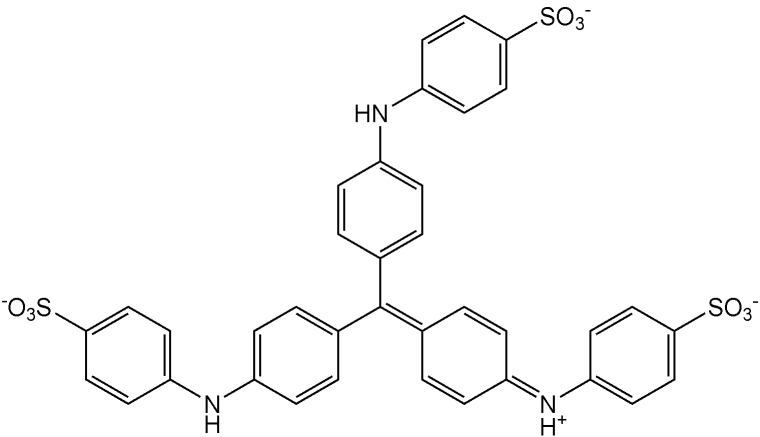
Methyl blue

Aniline Blue WS, also called aniline blue, diphenylamine blue, China blue, or Soluble blue, is a mixture of methyl blue and water blue. It may also be either one of them. It is a soluble dye used as a biological dye, in fluorescence microscopy, appearing a yellow-green colour after excitation with violet light. It is a mixture of the trisulfonates of triphenyl rosaniline and of diphenyl rosaniline.

Aniline blue or its constituents are used to stain collagen, as the fibre stain in Masson's trichrome, as well as to reveal callose structures in plant tissues.

It can also be used in other connective tissue stains, such as Mallory's stain, Gömöri trichrome stain, and Carstair's Method. It is used in differential staining.
