= Louis Kahlenberg =

American chemist (1870–1941)

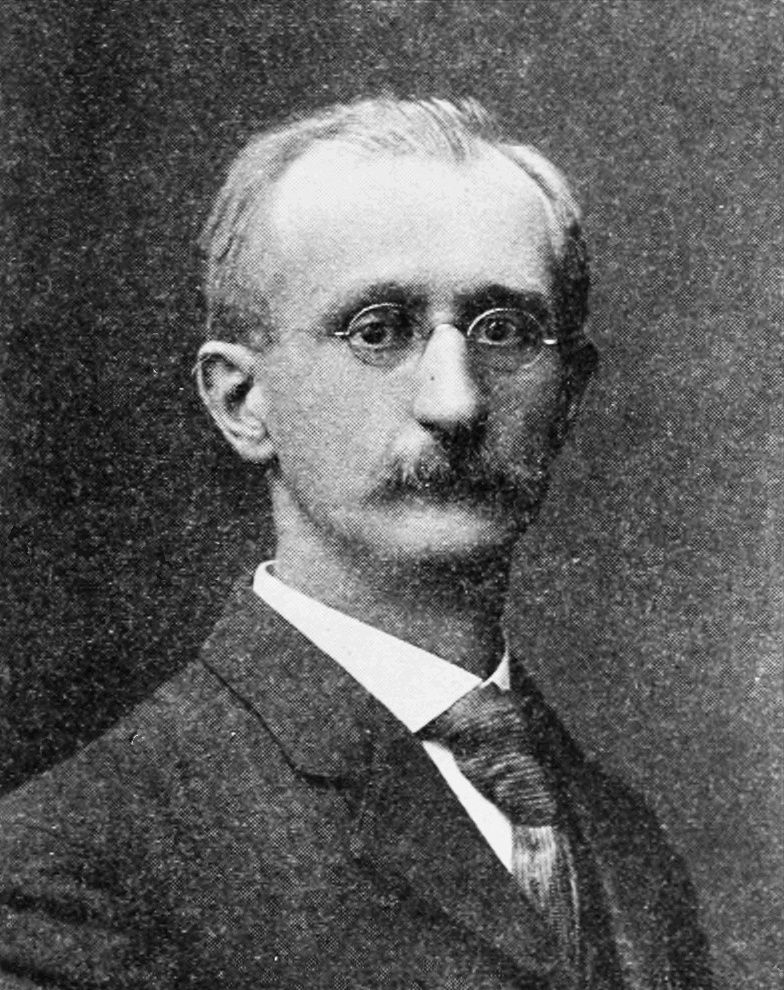
Louis Kahlenberg as published in The Popular Science Monthly, 1909. Here, he is a Professor of Physical Chemistry at the University of Wisconsin.

Louis Albrecht Kahlenberg (20 January 1870 – 18 March 1941) was an American chemist known for his contributions in the field of electrochemistry; in particular, ionic compounds, electrolytic disassociation of salts and pharmaceutical chemistry. He served as a professor at the University of Wisconsin.

== Early life and education ==
Kahlenberg was born in Two Rivers, Wisconsin, the son of German immigrants Albert Kahlenberg and Bertha Kahlenberg (née Albrecht). He attended the local Lutheran school, the Two Rivers High School, before training at the Oshkosh Normal School to become a teacher. He then attended the Milwaukee Normal School, before receiving a Bachelor of Science degree from the University of Wisconsin in 1892 and a Master of Science degree the following year. He then went on to study under Wilhelm Ostwald at the University of Leipzig, receiving a Ph.D. in 1895 for his work on the solubility of copper and lead tartarates.

Kahlenberg returned to the US and became an instructor in physical chemistry and later moved to the pharmacy school. He became a full professor in 1901. During World War I, he was opposed to the American involvement leading to his demotion in the chemistry department from the position of head in 1919. He was considered a great teacher. In 1930, he was elected head of the American Electrochemical Society.

== Personal life ==
Kahlenberg married Lillan Belle Heald in 1896 and they had three children, including Herman who also studied chemistry under his father and began the Kahlenberg Laboratories where he produced a suturing material called "Equisetene".

== Inventions ==
Kahlenberg is credited with the inventing and developing Equisetene suture thread.
