= Ostwald color system =

Color space invented by Wilhelm Ostwald

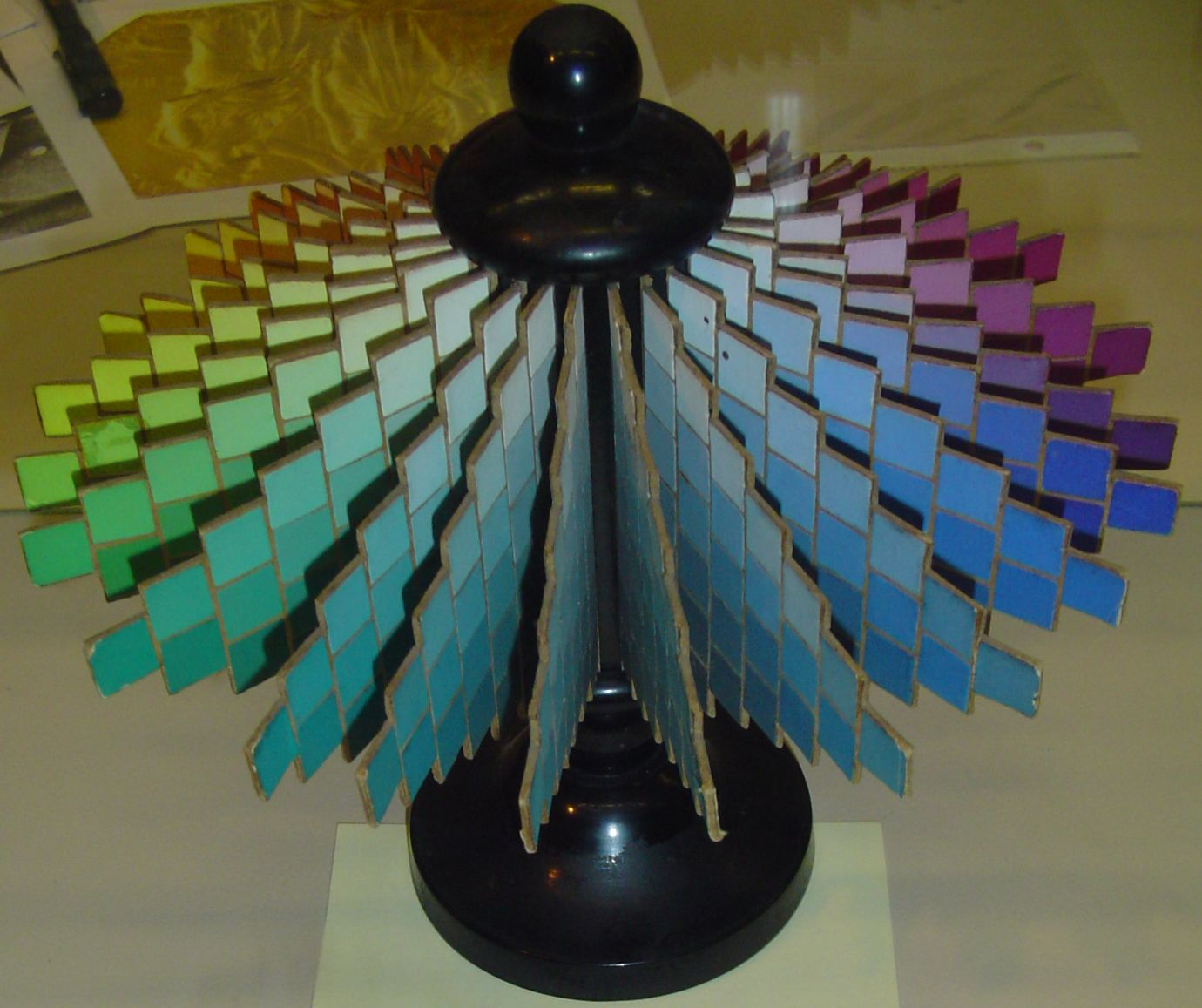
Ostwald color solid

A three-dimensional drawing of Wilhelm Ostwald’s color system

In colorimetry, the Ostwald color system is a color space that was invented by the Baltic German chemist Wilhelm Ostwald. Associated with The Color Harmony Manual, it comprises a set of paint chips representing the Ostwald color space. There are four different editions of the Color Harmony Manual. Each manual is made up of charts, with each chart being a different color space.

== Ostwald ==
Ostwald recommended a systematic arrangement of colors and a standardization of colors used. Ostwald believed colors should only be used and selected from a finite collection. He acknowledged that his system left out some intermediate colors between the ones he selected, but he did not work to include them in his color space.

Ostwald's system provides a single, midpoint interpolation between adjacent colors. It does not have an easy way of recording millions of colors.

== The charts ==
The Color Harmony Manual is made up of charts of colored chips representing a color space. Ostwald proposed his theory in a 3-dimensional double cone shape. This spinning top solid shape comprised 24 triangles or charts (up to the manual's first two editions). The overall shape of a chart is an equilateral triangle array made up of 28 samples. Each chart is made up of samples of approximately the same hue. Each chart has one sample with the greatest purity. This sample is the far point of the triangle. A series of five samples with increasing reflectance and decreasing purity are on the upper edge of the triangle. It ends with an almost-gray modification of the original pure hue. A series of five samples with decreasing reflectance and decreasing purity are on the lower edge of the triangle. It ends with an almost-black modification of the original hue. Between these light and dark series are other samples of intermediate reflectance and purity.

Ostwald's colour theory categorized colours into three groups: neutral colours (combinations of black and white), pure “full colours” (containing no black or white) and mixed colours (combinations of colours with black and/or white). Hence, each triangle or chart (representing a particular hue) contained 28 monochromatic colour samples arranged in a pattern of neutral, full, and mixed colours.

All color samples on the same chart have almost the same dominant wavelength. All color samples in the same vertical row have almost the same dominant wavelength and purity, making the only difference the reflectances.

Color samples were made from clear cellulose acetate sheets with one side coated with an opaque colored lacquer. This ensured that both sides are the same color while one side is glossy and the other is matte.

== History of editions ==
The Color Harmony Manuals were published beginning in 1942, and have been out of print since 1972.

Ostwald's first Color Harmony Manual was a set of 12 handbooks showing complementary hues. The first edition was published in 1942. It contained 680 color chips. Each color chip was a 5/8 inch square and had a tab where the Ostwald notation was written.

A Color Harmony Index was also produced. It used larger 1 inch square color chips. But, due to its price only a few were sold.

In 1945, Walter C. Granville was asked to produce a second edition. The second edition used the chips from the Color Harmony Index but was formatted up the same way as the first edition. The second edition is also called the large chip edition. By 1948 all copies of both the first and second edition had sold.

The third edition was published in February 1949. A different colorimetric base was used for the third edition, so the colors are approximate matches to the colors of the first and second editions. The samples in the third edition were hexagons about 22mm wide. Third edition also had more charts than in previous editions (28 complete charts and some partial charts). There was also a second production of the third edition to reuse batches of the liquors used to make the color chip stock.

The fourth edition was published in 1958. It was sold until 1972. A different base lacquer formula was used in the fourth edition, and there was a substitute of some pigments, most notably in one of the yellows. In 1971, Granville was asked to compare the colors of the third and fourth editions. He found that the fourth edition did not meet the third edition's standards. Colors between the fourth edition did not match the colors of the first edition as closely as the third edition had. This was confirmed by W. N. Hale and the fourth edition was discontinued.

The overproduction of color chips for the third and fourth editions lead to sales of individual chips.

Edition	Copyright Date	Discontinued Date	Copies Made	Number of Colors	Price
First	1942	1946	750	680	$50
Index	1942	1946	10	680	$325
Second (Large Chip)	1946	1948	250	680	$125
Third (1st Production)	1948	1954	1750	944	$113-$125
Third (2nd Production)	1954	1958	1750	944	$150
Fourth	1958	1972	3000+ (est)	949	$250

== The first and second editions ==
For the first and second editions, the color chips were made from the same stock. So the colors between these two editions are identical. Carl E. Foss made the chip stock using disc mixtures. A modification was needed to show the colors of maximum purity between the full color and white. The disc mixtures of the full color and white gave colors less saturated than the pigmented lacquers could. To fix this, Foss substituted the pigment for the disc mixture. This substitute included colors that would have been left out if the Ostwald color theory had been followed directly.

== See also ==
- HSL and HSV
- Color model
- Natural Color System
- Munsell color system
