= Großbothen =

- Stadtteil of Grimma
- Interactive map of Großbothen
- Location within Germany Location within Saxony
- Coordinates: 51°12′N 12°45′E
- Country: Germany
- State: Saxony
- District: Leipzig
- Town: Grimma

Area
  - Total: 33.45 km^{2} (12.92 sq mi)
- Elevation: 133 m (436 ft)

Population (2009-12-31)
  - Total: 3,453
  - Density: 103.2/km^{2} (267.4/sq mi)
- Time zone: UTC+01:00 (CET)
  - Summer (DST): UTC+02:00 (CEST)
- Postal codes: 04668
- Dialling codes: 034384
- Vehicle registration: L
- Website: www.grossbothen.de

Großbothen is a village and a former municipality in the Leipzig district in Saxony, Germany. Großbothen had an area of 33.45 km^{2} and a population of 3,453 (as of December 31, 2009). At a local government reform on 1 January 2011, the municipality was split up and divided over the towns Grimma and Colditz. The village Großbothen is now part of Grimma. Großbothen was the death place of Wilhelm Wundt.
