= Liesegang rings =

Banding resulting from chemical reactions

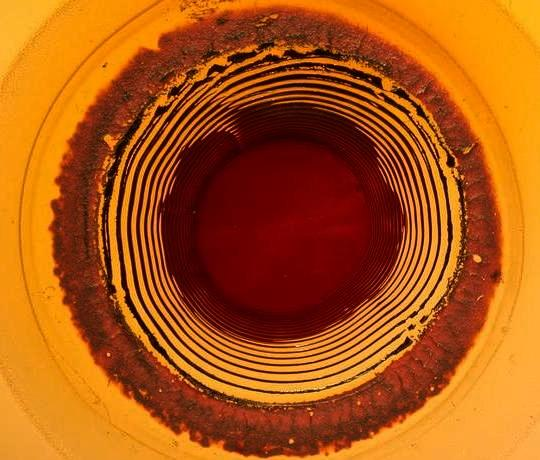
Liesegang rings - Silver-chromate precipitate pattern in a layer of gelatine

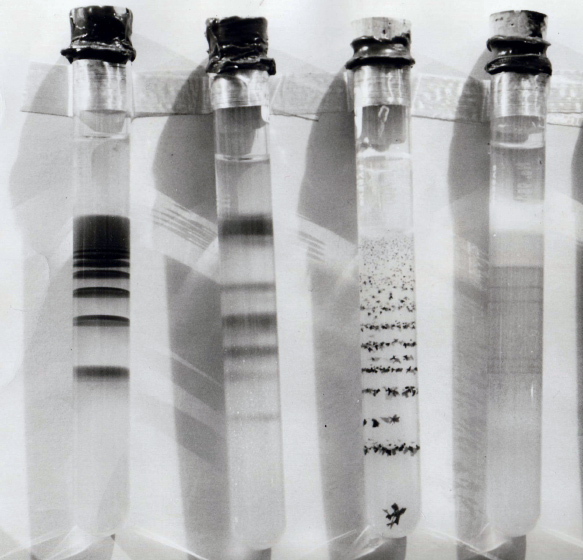
Some Liesegang Rings

Liesegang rings (/ˈliːzəɡɑːŋ/) are a phenomenon seen in many, if not most, chemical systems undergoing a precipitation reaction under certain conditions of concentration and in the absence of convection. Rings are formed when weakly soluble salts are produced from reaction of two soluble substances, one of which is dissolved in a gel medium. The phenomenon is most commonly seen as rings in a Petri dish or bands in a test tube; however, more complex patterns have been observed, such as dislocations of the ring structure in a Petri dish, helices, and "Saturn rings" in a test tube. Despite continuous investigation since rediscovery of the rings in 1896, the mechanism for the formation of Liesegang rings is still unclear.

== History ==
The phenomenon was first noticed in 1855 by the German chemist Friedlieb Ferdinand Runge. He observed them in the course of experiments on the precipitation of reagents in blotting paper. In 1896 the German chemist Raphael E. Liesegang noted the phenomenon when he dropped a solution of silver nitrate onto a thin layer of gel containing potassium dichromate. After a few hours, sharp concentric rings of insoluble silver dichromate formed. It has aroused the curiosity of chemists for many years. When formed in a test tube by diffusing one component from the top, layers or bands of precipitate form, rather than rings.

== Silver nitrate–potassium dichromate reaction ==
The reactions are most usually carried out in test tubes into which a gel is formed that contains a dilute solution of one of the reactants.

If a hot solution of agar gel also containing a dilute solution of potassium dichromate is poured in a test tube, and after the gel solidifies a more concentrated solution of silver nitrate is poured on top of the gel, the silver nitrate will begin to diffuse into the gel. It will then encounter the potassium dichromate and will form a continuous region of precipitate at the top of the tube.

After some hours, the continuous region of precipitation is followed by a clear region with no sensible precipitate, followed by a short region of precipitate further down the tube. This process continues down the tube forming several, up to perhaps a couple dozen, alternating regions of clear gel and precipitate rings.

== Some general observations ==
Liesegang band experiment. Red material is gelatin with Mg sulfate (MgSO_{4}) and a drop of red food coloring; clear material above it is concentrated ammonium hydroxide. Diffusion of NH_{4}OH into the gelatin causes discontinuous precipitation of Mg hydroxide ( Mg(OH)_{2}

Over the decades huge number of precipitation reactions have been used to study the phenomenon, and it seems quite general. Chromates, metal hydroxides, carbonates, and sulfides, formed with lead, copper, silver, mercury and cobalt salts are sometimes favored by investigators, perhaps because of the pretty, colored precipitates formed.

The gels used are usually gelatin, agar or silicic acid gel.

The concentration ranges over which the rings form in a given gel for a precipitating system can usually be found for any system by a little systematic empirical experimentation in a few hours. Often the concentration of the component in the agar gel should be substantially less concentrated (perhaps an order of magnitude or more) than the one placed on top of the gel.

The first feature usually noted is that the bands which form farther away from the liquid-gel interface are generally farther apart. Some investigators measure this distance and report in some systems, at least, a systematic formula for the distance that they form at. The most frequent observation is that the distance apart that the rings form is proportional to the distance from the liquid-gel interface. This is by no means universal, however, and sometimes they form at essentially random, irreproducible distances.

Another feature often noted is that the bands themselves do not move with time, but rather form in place and stay there.

For very many systems the precipitate that forms is not the fine coagulant or flocs seen on mixing the two solutions in the absence of the gel, but rather coarse, crystalline dispersions. Sometimes the crystals are well separated from one another, and only a few form in each band.

The precipitate that forms a band is not always a binary insoluble compound, but may be even a pure metal. Water glass of density 1.06 made acidic by sufficient acetic acid to make it gel, with 0.05 N copper sulfate in it, covered by a 1 percent solution of hydroxylamine hydrochloride produces large tetrahedrons of metallic copper in the bands.

It is not possible to make any general statement of the effect of the composition of the gel. A system that forms nicely for one set of components, might fail altogether and require a different set of conditions if the gel is switched, say, from agar to gelatin. The essential feature of the gel required is that thermal convection in the tube be prevented altogether.

Most systems will form rings in the absence of the gelling system if the experiment is carried out in a capillary, where convection does not disturb their formation. In fact, the system does not have to even be liquid. A tube plugged with cotton with a little ammonium hydroxide at one end, and a solution of hydrochloric acid at the other will show rings of deposited ammonium chloride where the two gases meet, if the conditions are chosen correctly. Ring formation has also been observed in solid glasses containing a reducible species. For example, bands of silver have been generated by immersing silicate glass in molten AgNO_{3} for extended periods of time (Pask and Parmelee, 1943).

== Theories ==
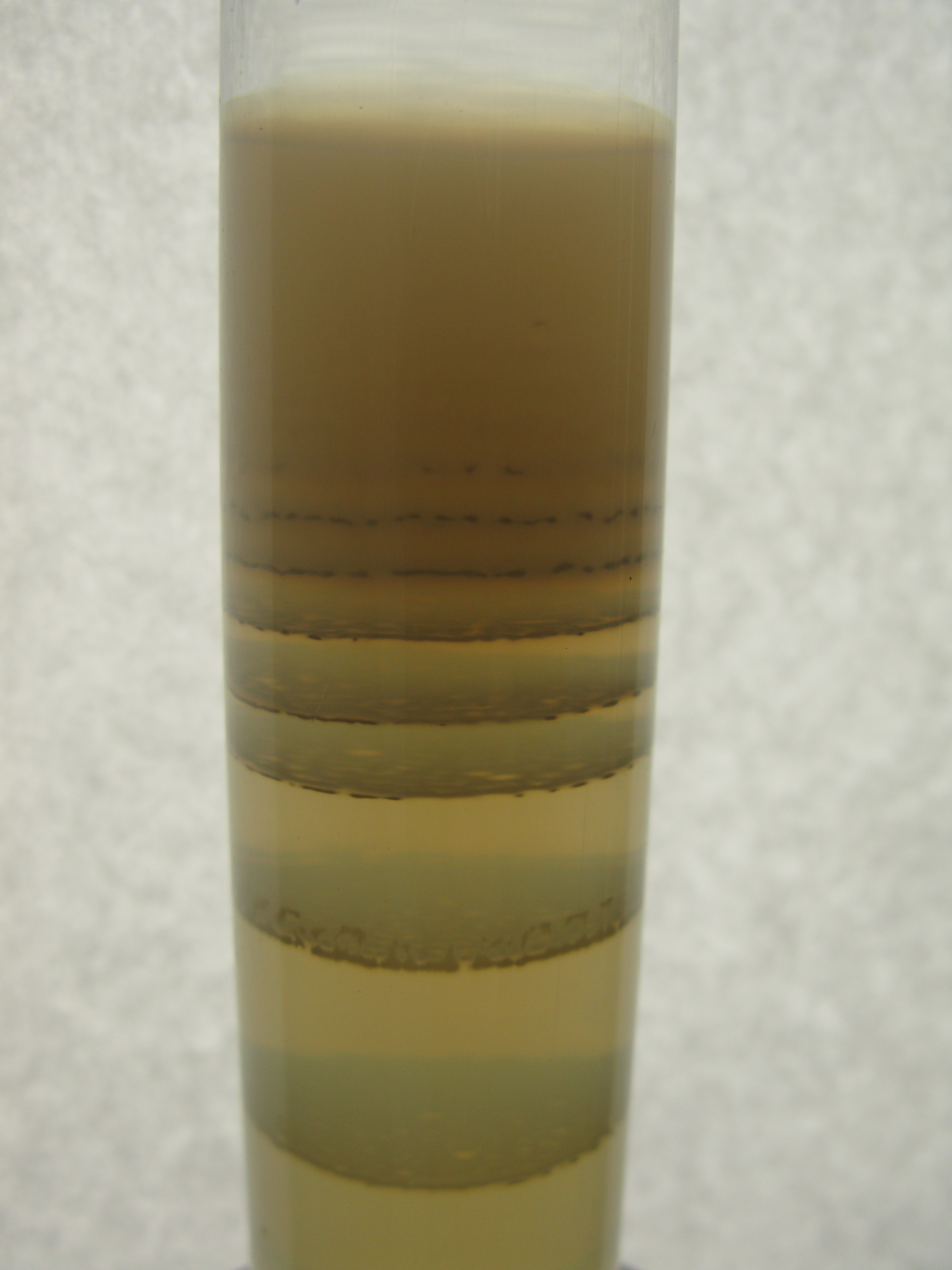
Liesegang rings of magnesium hydroxide in agar gel made by diffusing ammonium hydroxide into an agar gel containing magnesium chloride.

Several different theories have been proposed to explain the formation of Liesegang rings. The chemist Wilhelm Ostwald in 1897 proposed a theory based on the idea that a precipitate is not formed immediately upon the concentration of the ions exceeding a solubility product, but a region of supersaturation occurs first. When the limit of stability of the supersaturation is reached, the precipitate forms, and a clear region forms ahead of the diffusion front because the precipitate that is below the solubility limit diffuses into the precipitate. This was argued to be a critically flawed theory when it was shown that seeding the gel with a colloidal dispersion of the precipitate (which would arguably prevent any significant region of supersaturation) did not prevent the formation of the rings.

Another theory focuses on the adsorption of one or the other of the precipitating ions onto the colloidal particles of the precipitate which forms. If the particles are small, the absorption is large, diffusion is "hindered" and this somehow results in the formation of the rings.

Still another proposal, the "coagulation theory" states that the precipitate first forms as a fine colloidal dispersion, which then undergoes coagulation by an excess of the diffusing electrolyte and this somehow results in the formation of the rings.

Some more recent theories invoke an auto-catalytic step in the reaction that results in the formation of the precipitate. This would seem to contradict the notion that auto-catalytic reactions are, actually, quite rare in nature.

The solution of the diffusion equation with proper boundary conditions, and a set of good assumptions on supersaturation, adsorption, auto-catalysis, and coagulation alone, or in some combination, has not been done yet, it appears, at least in a way that makes a quantitative comparison with experiment possible. However, a theoretical approach for the Matalon-Packter law predicting the position of the precipitate bands when the experiments are performed in a test tube, has been provided

A general theory based on Ostwald's 1897 theory has recently been proposed. It can account for several important features sometimes seen, such as revert and helical banding.
