= Friedlieb Ferdinand Runge =

German analytical chemist (1794 – 1867)

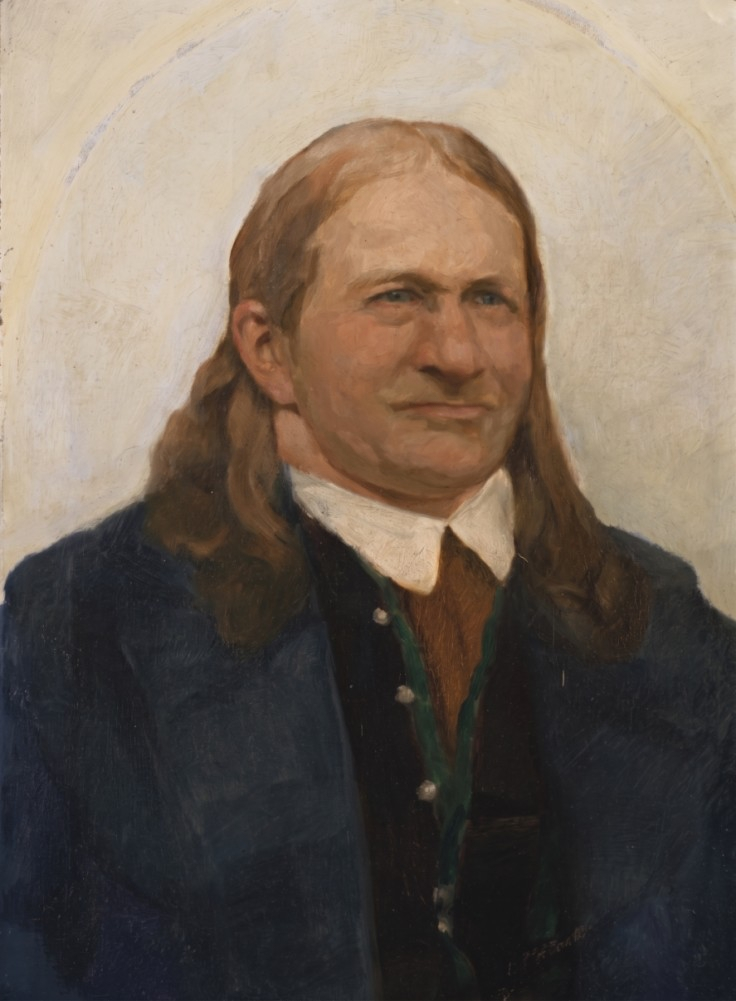
- Born: 8 February 1794; Hamburg, Holy Roman Empire
- Died: 25 March 1867 (aged 73); Oranienburg, Prussia
- Education: University of Jena; University of Berlin (PhD)
- Scientific career
- Workplaces: University of Berlin; University of Breslau
- Doctoral advisor: Johann Wolfgang Döbereiner

Friedlieb Ferdinand Runge (8 February 1794 – 25 March 1867) was a German analytical chemist. Runge identified the mydriatic (pupil dilating) effects of belladonna (deadly nightshade) extract, identified caffeine, and discovered the first coal tar dye (aniline blue).

== Early life ==
Friedlieb Ferdinand Runge was born near Hamburg on 8 February 1794. From a young age, Runge conducted chemical experiments, serendipitously identifying the mydriatic (pupil dilating) effects of belladonna (deadly nightshade) extract.

== Career ==
In 1819, Runge was invited to show Goethe how belladonna caused dilation of the pupil, which Runge did, using a cat as an experimental subject. Goethe was so impressed with the demonstration that

"Nachdem Goethe mir seine größte Zufriedenheit sowol über die Erzählung des durch scheinbaren schwarzen Staar Geretteten, wie auch über das andere ausgesprochen, übergab er mir noch eine Schachtel mit Kaffeebohnen, die ein Grieche ihm als etwas Vorzügliches gesandt. "Auch diese können sie zu Ihren Untersuchungen brauchen," sagte Goethe. Er hatte recht; denn bald darauf entdeckte ich darin das, wegen seines großen Stickstoffgehaltes so berühmt gewordene Coffein."

"After Goethe had expressed to me his greatest satisfaction regarding the account of the man whom I'd rescued [from serving in Napoleon's army] by apparent "black star" [i.e., amaurosis, blindness] as well as the other, he handed me a carton of coffee beans, which a Greek had sent him as a delicacy. "You can also use these in your investigations," said Goethe. He was right; for soon thereafter I discovered therein caffeine, which became so famous on account of its high nitrogen content."

A few months later, Runge identified caffeine.

Runge studied chemistry in Jena and Berlin, where he obtained his doctorate. After touring Europe for three years, he taught chemistry at the University of Breslau until 1831. From then on he worked for a state-owned chemical company in Oranienburg near Berlin, but was dismissed at the age of 58 when the company was privatised in 1852. He lost his pension and company flat in 1855 due to a dispute over intellectual property with the new management of the company. He died twelve years later in Oranienburg. He is commemorated by the plant genus Rungia named after him in 1832 by the botanist Nathaniel Wallich.

== Discoveries ==
His chemical work included purine chemistry, the identification of caffeine, the discovery of the first coal tar dye (aniline blue), (Runge called aniline "Kyanol" (blue-oil)) coal tar products (and a large number of substances that derive from coal tar), initial oxidation of aniline in 1834, paper chromatography, pyrrole, chinoline, phenol, thymol and atropine. Runge placed drops of reactant solutions on blotting paper and then added a drop of a second reactant solution on top of the first drop. The solutions would react as they spread through the blotting paper, often producing colored patterns. His results were published in two books, Farbenchemie. Musterbilder für Freunde des Schönen und zum Gebrauch für Zeichner, Maler, Verzierer und Zeugdrucker, dargestellt durch chemische Wechselwirkung and Der Bildungstrieb der Stoffe, veranschaulicht in selbstständig gewachsenen Bilder.

In 1855, he was the first to notice the phenomenon of Liesegang rings, observing them in the course of experiments on the precipitation of reagents in blotting paper.

== Honours ==
In 1832 botanist Christian Gottfried Daniel Nees von Esenbeck published Rungia, a genus of flowering plants belonging to the family Acanthaceae (about 82 species worldwide), with its name honouring Friedlieb Ferdinand Runge.

On February 8, 2019, Google celebrated his 225th birthday with a Google Doodle.

== Gallery ==
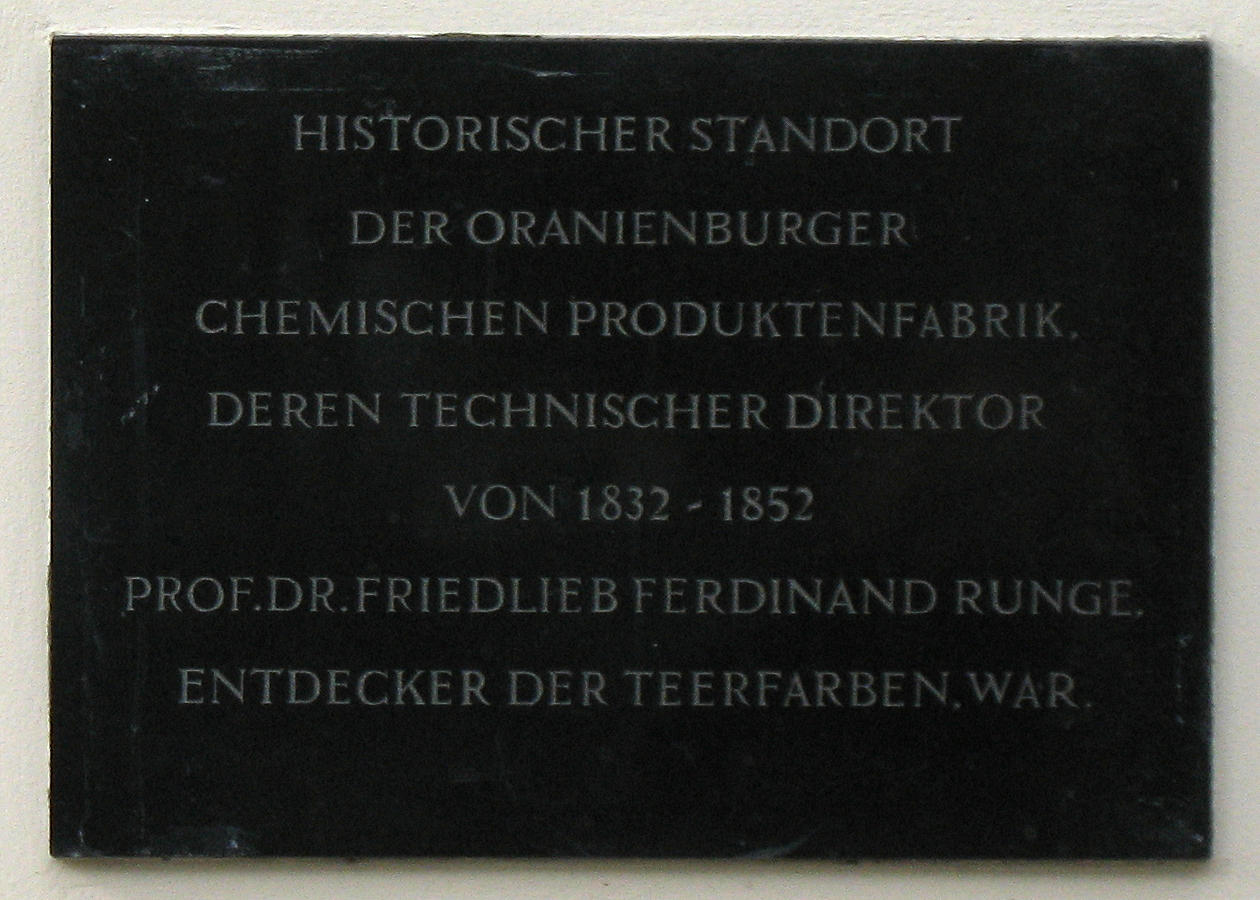
Commemorative plaque in Oranienburg. It reads: Historical site of the Oranienburg chemical product factory, whose technical director from 1832 to 1852 was Prof. Dr. Friedlieb Ferdinand Runge, discoverer of coal tar dyes.

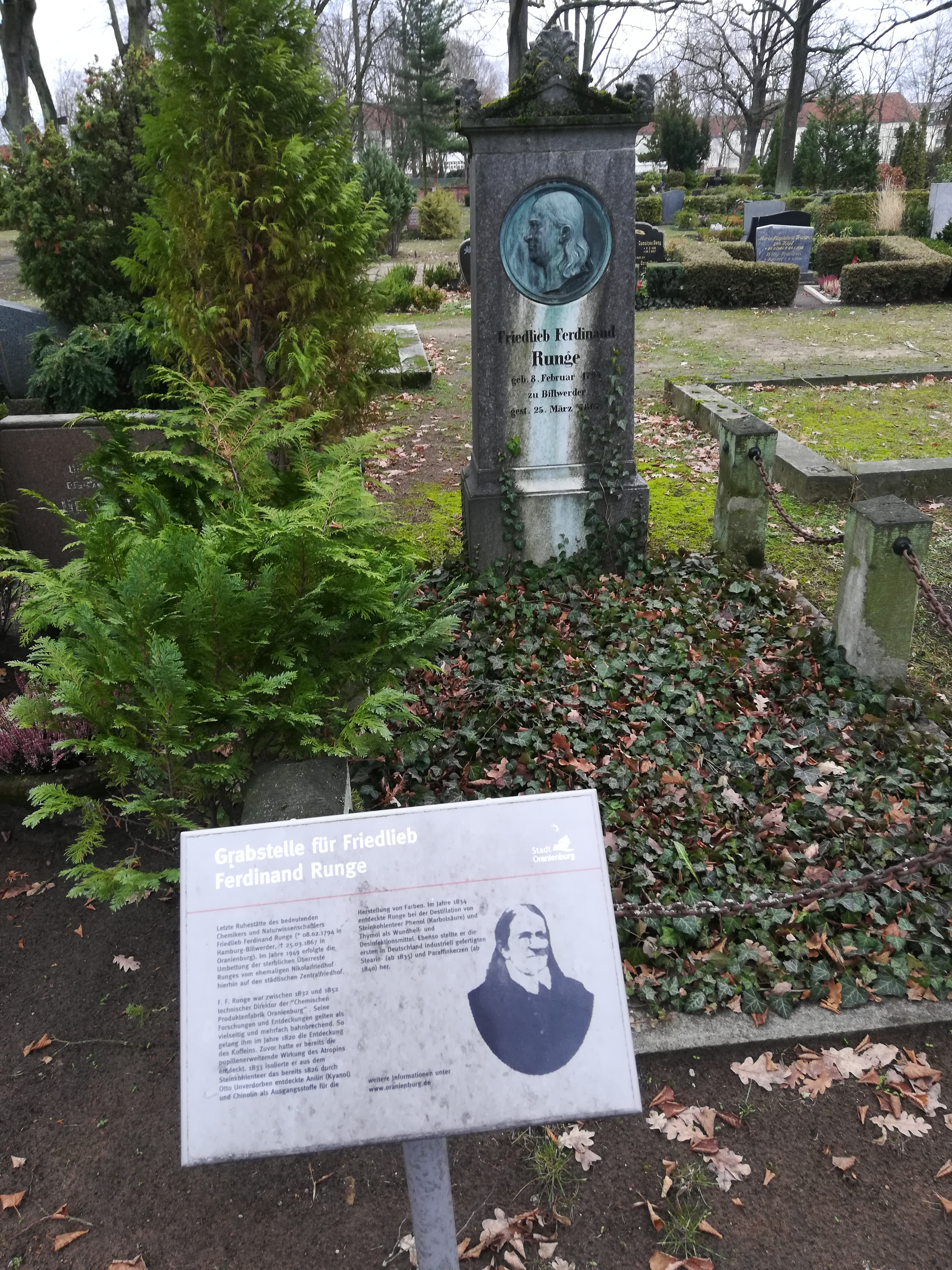
Grave in Oranienburg

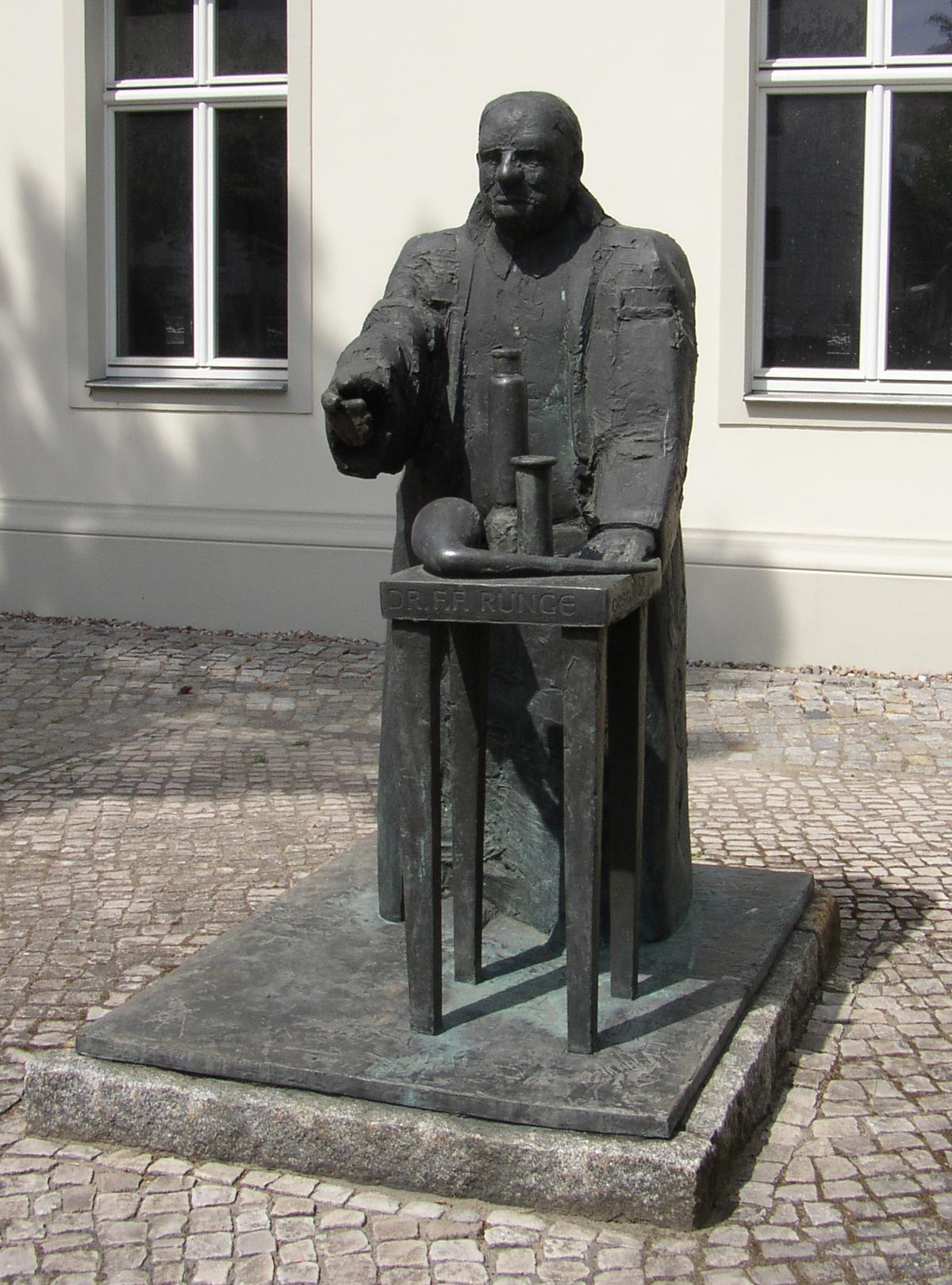
Memorial in Oranienburg

== Sources ==
- Weinberg, BA; Bealer, BA (2001). The world of caffeine. New York & London: Routledge. ISBN 0-415-92722-6.
- Kränzlein, G. (1935). "Zum 100 jährigen Gedächtnis der Arbeiten von F. F. Runge". Angewandte Chemie. 48 (1): 1–3. Bibcode:1935AngCh..48....1K. doi:10.1002/ange.19350480103.
- Bussemas, H. H.; Harsch, G.; Ettre, L. S. (1994). "Friedlieb Ferdinand Runge (1794–1867): "Self-grown pictures" as precursors of paper chromatography". Chromatographia. 38 (3–4): 243–254. doi:10.1007/BF02290345. S2CID 94297466.
