= Mallory's trichrome stain =

Stain utilized in histology

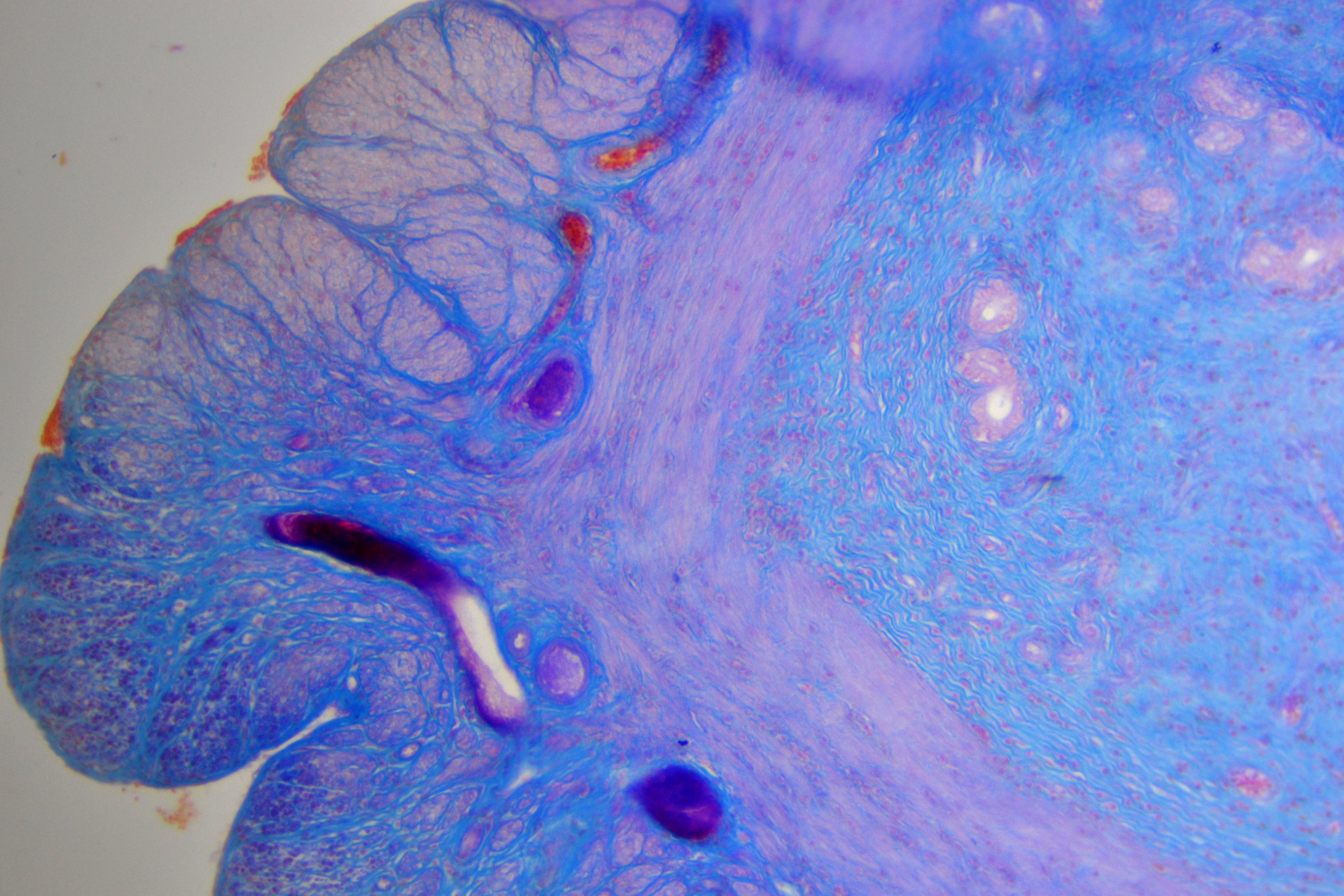
Uterus of a rat stained with Mallory's stain.

Mallory's trichrome stain also called Mallory's Triple Stain is a stain utilized in histology to aid in revealing different macromolecules that make up the cell. It uses the three stains: aniline blue, acid fuchsin, and orange G. As a result, this staining technique can reveal collagen, ordinary cytoplasm, and red blood cells. It is used in examining the collagen of connective tissue.

For tissues that are not directly acidic or basic, it can be difficult to use only one stain to reveal the necessary structures of interest. A combination of the three different stains in precise amounts applied in the correct order reveals the details selectively. This is the result of more than just electrostatic interactions of stain with the tissue and the stain not being washed out after each step. Collectively the stains complement one another.

The staining technique was first published in 1900 by Frank Burr Mallory, then a histologist at Harvard University Medical School. Many variants of the method exist to simplify or speed processing or to stain other materials. Mallory's and other polychrome stains developed in the early 20th century led to Papanicolaou stain and other popular polychrome staining methods.

The primary application when the stain was introduced was differentiation of structures in connective tissue, and this remains its most common use. Some work however has indicated the stain can highlight differential RNA synthesis. This has been used in identifying ectopic endometrial tissue.
