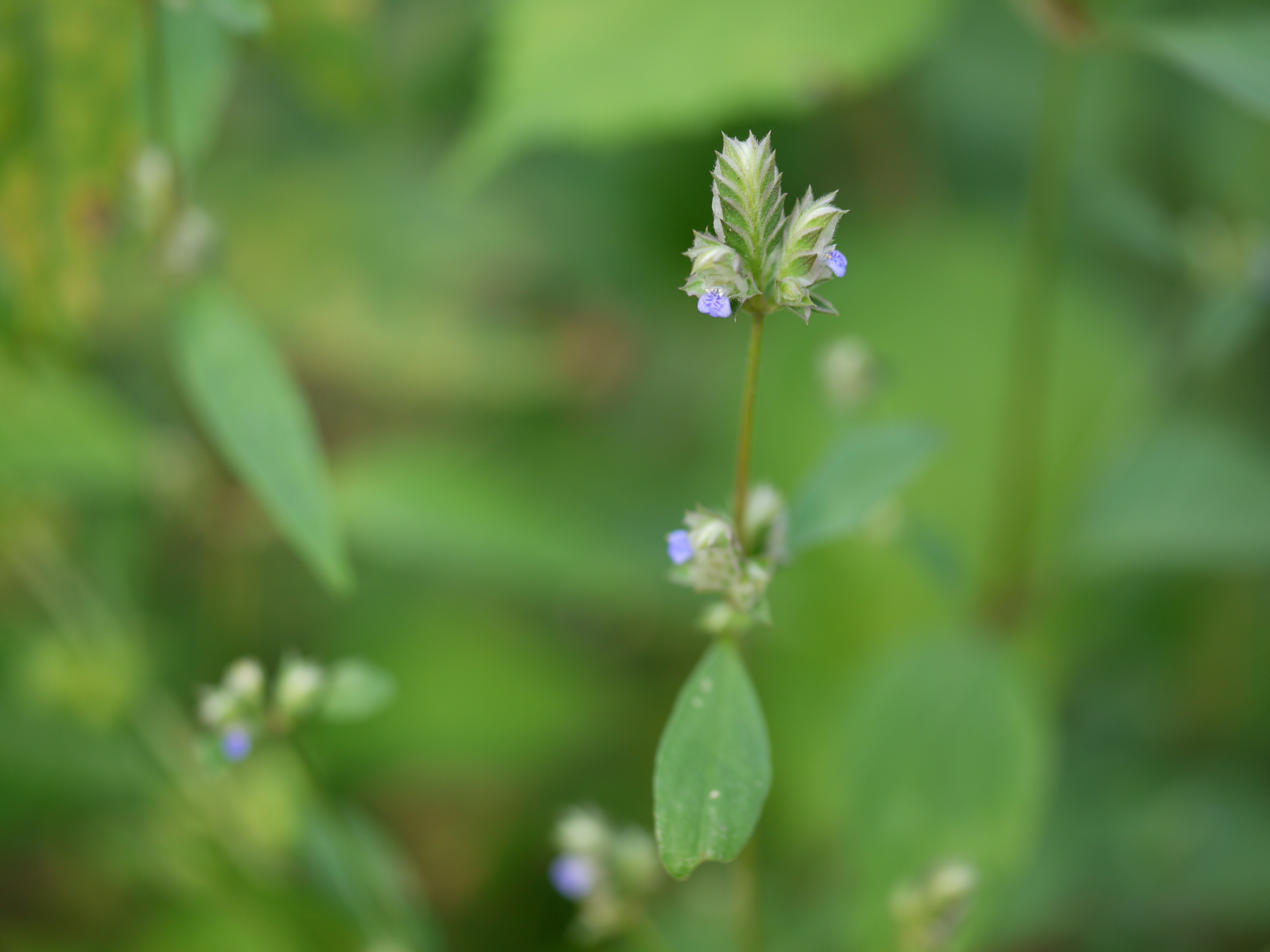
- Rungia pectinata

Scientific classification
- Kingdom: Plantae
- Clade: Tracheophytes
- Clade: Angiosperms
- Clade: Eudicots
- Clade: Asterids
- Order: Lamiales
- Family: Acanthaceae
- Genus: Rungia; Nees

= Rungia =

Genus of plants

Rungia is a genus of flowering plants belonging to the family Acanthaceae.

Its native range is Tropical Africa (within Angola, Benin, Burundi, Cameroon, Central African Republic, Congo, Ethiopia, Gabon, Ghana, Guinea, Gulf of Guinea Islands, Guinea-Bissau, Ivory Coast, Liberia, Mali, Nigeria, Senegal, Sierra Leone, Sudan, Tanzania, Uganda and Democratic Republic of the Congo), southern Arabian Peninsula (within Oman and Yemen), Tropical and Subtropical Asia (within the Andaman Islands, Assam, Bangladesh, Cambodia, China, East Himalaya, Hainan, India, Java, Laccadive Islands, Laos, Lesser Sunda Islands, Malaya, Maldives, Myanmar, Nepal, New Guinea, Philippines, Sri Lanka, Sulawesi, Sumatera, Taiwan, Thailand, Tibet, Vietnam and West Himalaya ).

The genus name of Rungia is in honour of Friedlieb Ferdinand Runge (1794–1867), a German analytical chemist. It was first described and published in N.Wallich, Pl. Asiat. Rar. Vol.3 on page 77 in 1832.

== Known species ==
According to Kew:

- Rungia adnata (J.B.Imlay) B.Hansen
- Rungia apiculata Bedd.
- Rungia axilliflora H.S.Lo
- Rungia beddomei C.B.Clarke
- Rungia bisaccata D.Fang & H.S.Lo
- Rungia blumeana Valeton
- Rungia brandisii C.B.Clarke
- Rungia burmanica (C.B.Clarke) B.Hansen
- Rungia caespitosa Lindau
- Rungia camerunensis Champl.
- Rungia chamaedryoides Bremek.
- Rungia chinensis Benth.
- Rungia clauda (Benoist) B.Hansen
- Rungia congoensis C.B.Clarke
- Rungia crenata T.Anderson
- Rungia daklakensis D.V.Hai, Y.F.Deng & Joongku Lee
- Rungia densiflora H.S.Lo
- Rungia dimorpha S.Moore
- Rungia diversibracteata J.B.Imlay
- Rungia diversiformis Nees
- Rungia eberhardtii (Benoist) B.Hansen
- Rungia elegans Dalzell & A.Gibson
- Rungia eriostachya Hua
- Rungia evrardii Benoist
- Rungia flaviflora Z.L.Lin & Y.F.Deng
- Rungia grandis T.Anderson
- Rungia guangxiensis H.S.Lo & D.Fang
- Rungia guineensis Heine
- Rungia heterophylla Bremek.
- Rungia himalayensis C.B.Clarke
- Rungia hirpex Benoist
- Rungia incompta Bremek.
- Rungia khasiana T.Anderson
- Rungia khoii D.V.Hai, Y.F.Deng & Joongku Lee
- Rungia klossii S.Moore
- Rungia laeta C.B.Clarke
- Rungia latior Nees
- Rungia lepida C.B.Clarke
- Rungia letestui Benoist
- Rungia linifolia Nees
- Rungia longifolia Nees
- Rungia longipes D.Fang & H.S.Lo
- Rungia maculata Craib
- Rungia mastersii T.Anderson
- Rungia membranacea Merr.
- Rungia mina H.S.Lo
- Rungia minutiflora C.B.Clarke
- Rungia monetaria (Benoist) B.Hansen
- Rungia naoensis B.Hansen
- Rungia napoensis D.Fang & H.S.Lo
- Rungia oligoneura (J.B.Imlay) B.Hansen
- Rungia paxiana (Lindau) C.B.Clarke
- Rungia pectinata (L.) Nees
- Rungia philippinensis C.B.Clarke
- Rungia pierrei Benoist
- Rungia pinpienensis H.S.Lo
- Rungia podostachya Bremek.
- Rungia punduana Nees
- Rungia pungens D.Fang & H.S.Lo
- Rungia purpurascens (Ridl.) B.Hansen
- Rungia repens (L.) Nees
- Rungia rivicola Craib
- Rungia rungioides (Kuntze) Backer
- Rungia salaccensis Valeton
- Rungia saranganensis Bremek.
- Rungia schliebenii Mildbr.
- Rungia selangorensis (C.B.Clarke) B.Hansen
- Rungia silvatica Hochr.
- Rungia sinothailandica Z.L.Lin & Y.F.Deng
- Rungia sisparensis T.Anderson ex C.B.Clarke
- Rungia smeruensis Bremek.
- Rungia stolonifera C.B.Clarke
- Rungia subtilifolia (J.B.Imlay) B.Hansen
- Rungia sumatrana Miq.
- Rungia taiwanensis T.Yamaz.
- Rungia tenuissima J.B.Imlay
- Rungia tonkinensis Benoist
- Rungia tristichantha Bremek.
- Rungia vegeta (Ridl.) B.Hansen
- Rungia wightiana Nees
- Rungia yunnanensis H.S.Lo
