= Differential staining =

Differential staining is a staining process which uses more than one chemical stain. Using multiple stains can better differentiate between different microorganisms or structures/cellular components of a single organism.

Differential staining is used to detect abnormalities in the proportion of different white blood cells in the blood. The process or results are called a WBC differential. This test is useful because many diseases alter the proportion of certain white blood cells. By analyzing these differences in combination with a clinical exam and other lab tests, medical professionals can diagnose disease.

One commonly recognizable use of differential staining is the Gram stain. Gram staining uses two dyes: Crystal violet and Fuchsin or Safranin (the counterstain) to differentiate between Gram-positive bacteria (large Peptidoglycan layer on outer surface of cell) and Gram-negative bacteria.

Acid-fast stains are also differential stains.
