= Raphael Eduard Liesegang =

German chemist and photographer (1869–1947)

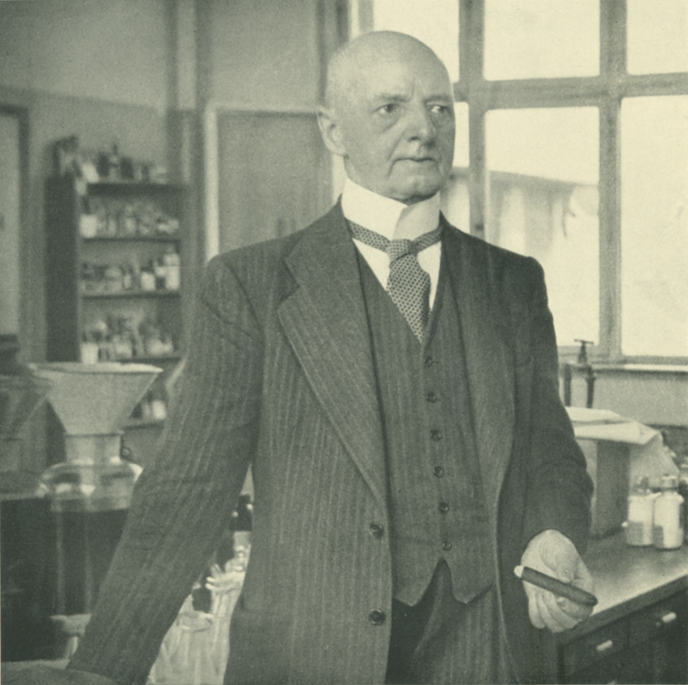
- Raphael Eduard Liesegang (1869–1947)
- Born: 1 November 1869; Elberfeld, Germany
- Died: 13 November 1947 (aged 78); Bad Homburg vor der Höhe Germany
- Scientific career
- Workplaces: Ed. Liesegang oHG

Raphael Eduard Liesegang (/ˈliːzəɡɑːŋ/) (1 November 1869 – 13 November 1947) was a German chemist, photographer and entrepreneur born in Elberfeld.

He is known for his work on Liesegang rings. He also helped develop the methods of capillary analysis, a precursor to paper chromatography, published a paper on the possibility of television (years before the discovery of the electron), contributed to chromosome theory, worked on properties of aerosols and gelatins, the origins of silicosis, the role of carbon dioxide in plant life and the mechanism of both black and white and colour photographic processes.

The son of a painter (and eventual photographer), Liesegang longed for an artistic career but lacked the ability to draw or paint. His father would later invent a camera and photography would go on to be one of Liesegangs passions. Research into photographic emulsions led to his personal discovery of Liesegang rings. He was not the first person to observe the effect, but they bear his name, as he devoted so much time to researching them.

As an heir to the founder of Ed. Liesegang oHG, Düsseldorf, he also owned a factory producing photographic paper and chemicals. Ed. Liesegang oHG later expanded into optics manufacturing, and sold its photochemical interests.

He has published the first German brochure on television : Beiträge zu Problem des elektrischen Fernsehen, 1st edition 1891, 2nd edition 1899
