= Comparison between Ido and Novial =

Comparison article on two main IALs

Novial was created as an international auxiliary language by Danish linguist Otto Jespersen, who introduced it to the world in 1928. Jespersen had previously been a co-author of Ido, which started to take form around 1907. Both languages base their vocabularies primarily on prominent Germanic and Romance languages, but differ grammatically in several important respects. Novial is more analytic in its grammar than Ido, and, in Jespersen's view, more natural.

Comparisons among Ido, Novial, and other notable international auxiliary languages have formed an important part of interlinguistic studies. For example, both Ido and Novial were among the languages investigated by the International Auxiliary Language Association (IALA), which developed Interlingua.

== Alphabets and pronunciation ==
Both Ido and Novial are written using the modern Latin alphabet (a.k.a. the English alphabet), with no diacritics. The letters w and z are not used in Novial (except in proper names and international symbols); c and q are (besides proper names and international symbols) only used in digraphs: ch and qu.

In the Phonetic Novial spelling system (1928, 1930) the main differences between the Novial vocabulary and those of other systems come from the suppression of the letters c and z. The letter s plays an important part but tends to distort the visual appearance of some words (sientie = science, sesa = cease, sivil(i) = civil).

Ido	IPA	Novial
A, a	/a/	A, a
B, b	/b/	B, b
C, c	/ts/	TS, ts
CH, ch	/tʃ/	CH, ch
D, d	/d/	D, d
E, e	/e/ or /ɛ/	E, e
F, f	/f/	F, f
G, g	/ɡ/	G, g
H, h	/h/	H, h
I, i	/i/	I, i
J, j	/ʒ/	J, j
Dj, dj	/dʒ/	J, j
K, k	/k/	K, k
L, l	/l/	L, l
M, m	/m/	M, m
N, n	/n/	N, n
O, o	/o/ or /ɒ/	O, o
P, p	/p/	P, p
QU, qu	/kw/ or /kv/	QU, qu
R, r	/r/	R, r
S, s	/s/	S, s
SH, sh	/ʃ/	SH, sh
T, t	/t/	T, t
U, u	/u/	U, u
V, v	/v/	V, v
W, w	/w/	U, u (after a vowel)
X, x	/ks/ or /ɡz/	X, x
Y, y	/j/	Y, y
Z, z	/z/	S, s

== Personal pronouns ==
Pronouns
	singular							plural							indef.
	1st	2nd		3rd				1st	2nd	3rd					indef.
	1st	familiar	formal	m.	f.	n.	pan-gender	1st	2nd	m.	f.	n.	pan-gender	Reflexive	indef.
English	I	you (thou)	you	he	she	it	he/it	we	you				they		one
Ido	me	tu	vu	il(u)	el(u)	ol(u)	lu	ni	vi	ili	eli	oli	li	su	on(u)
Novial	me	vu	vu	lo	la	lu(m)	le	nus	vus	los	las	lus	les	se	on

== Verbal systems ==
The grammars of Novial and Ido differ substantially in the way that the various tenses, moods and voices of verbs are expressed. Both use a combination of auxiliary verbs and verb endings. However, Novial uses many more auxiliary verbs and few endings, while Ido uses only one auxiliary verb and a greater number of verb endings.

As with most international auxiliary languages, all verb forms in Ido and Novial are independent of person (1st, 2nd or 3rd persons) and number (singular or plural).

== Language sample for comparison ==
Here is the Lord's Prayer in both languages:

Ido version: Patro nia, qua esas en la cielo, tua nomo santigesez; tua regno advenez; tua volo facesez quale en la cielo tale anke sur la tero. Donez a ni cadie l'omnidiala pano, e pardonez a ni nia ofensi, quale anke ni pardonas a nia ofensanti, e ne duktez ni aden la tento, ma liberigez ni del malajo.	Novial version: Nusen Patre, kel es in siele, mey vun nome bli sanktifika, mey vun regno veni; mey on fa vun volio kom in siele anke sur tere. Dona a nus disidi li omnidiali pane, e pardona a nus nusen ofensos, kom anke nus pardona a nusen ofensantes, e non dukte nus en tentatione, ma liberisa nus fro malu.
