= Comparison between Esperanto and Novial =

Comparison between two constructed languages

Esperanto and Novial are two different constructed international auxiliary languages. Their main difference is that while Esperanto is a schematic language, with an unvarying grammar, Novial is a naturalistic language, whose grammar and vocabulary varies to try to retain a "natural" sound. Demographically, Esperanto has thousands of times more speakers than Novial.

== Alphabet and pronunciation ==
Both Esperanto and Novial are written using versions of the Latin alphabet. The Esperanto alphabet has 28 letters: 22 without diacritics and 6 with diacritics unique to Esperanto: ĉ, ĝ, ĥ, ĵ, ŝ and ŭ. Novial uses 24 standard letters of the Latin alphabet with no diacritics. The letters w and z are not used in Novial (except in proper names and international symbols); c and q are (besides proper names and international symbols) only used in digraphs: ch and qu.

Esperanto	IPA	Novial
A, a	[a]	A, a
B, b	[b]	B, b
C, c	[ts]	Ts, ts; S, s
Ĉ, ĉ	[tʃ]	Ch, ch; Sh, sh
D, d	[d]	D, d
E, e	[e] or [ɛ]	E, e
F, f	[f]	F, f
G, g	[ɡ]	G, g
Ĝ, ĝ	[dʒ]	J, j
H, h	[h]	H, h
Ĥ, ĥ	[x]	K, k
I, i	[i]	I, i
J, j	[j]	Y, y
Ĵ, ĵ	[ʒ]	J, j
K, k	[k]	K, k
L, l	[l]	L, l
M, m	[m]	M, m
N, n	[n]	N, n
O, o	[o] or [ɔ]	O, o
P, p	[p]	P, p
Kv kv	[kv]	Qu, qu
R, r	[r]	R, r
S, s	[s]	S, s
Ŝ, ŝ	[ʃ]	Sh, sh; Ch, ch
T, t	[t]	T, t
U, u	[u]	U, u
Ŭ, ŭ	[u̯]	U, u (after a vowel)
V, v	[v]	V, v
Ks, ks; kz	[ks], [ɡz]	X, x
Z, z	[z]	S, s

In Esperanto one letter corresponds to one phoneme and one phoneme to one letter: there are no digraphs. Novial has 3 digraphs: ch, sh and qu; c and q are unique to these digraphs (except in foreign proper nouns) and permit no ambiguity; when s and h are separate phonemes this is indicated by separating with a hyphen: s-h. Novial permits some 2-vowel combinations to be pronounced either as 2 separate vowels or as diphthongs; for example, au, eu and oi may be pronounced as a + w, e + w and o + y, respectively, and ie, io and ia as y + e, y + o and y + a, respectively.

In handwriting neither Esperanto nor Novial presents any problem. However, the diacritics of Esperanto require special methods for typing and printing. The original method was a set of digraphs now known as the "h-system", but with the rise of computer word processing a so-called "x-system" has become equally popular. These systems are described in the article Esperanto orthography. However, with the advent of Unicode, the need for such work-arounds has lessened.

== Personal pronouns ==
The personal pronouns of Esperanto all end in i and some may be difficult to distinguish in a noisy environment (especially mi and ni). The personal pronouns of Novial use various vowels making them more distinct, although some differ only in the initial consonant (e.g. nus, vus and lus). A later form of nus – nos, more distinct from vus – has sometimes been used. Novial does not distinguish familiar and polite forms of “you” (e.g. French tu and vous). Novial's inventor argued that such a distinction has no place in a language intended solely for international use. The distinction is available in Esperanto but is little used in practice.

Pronouns
	singular							plural						indef.
	1st	2nd		3rd				1st	2nd	3rd				indef.
	1st	familiar	formal	m.	f.	n.	pan-gender	1st	2nd	m.	f.	n.	pan-gender	indef.
English	I	thou¹	you¹	he	she	it	they/it	we	you				they	one
Esperanto	mi	ci¹	vi¹	li	ŝi	ĝi	-/ri²/ĝi²/gi	ni	vi		iŝi³	iĝi³	ili/iri³	oni
Novial	me	vu	vu	lo	la	lu	le	nus	vus	los	las	lus	les	on

¹ ci and thou, while technically the familiar form of the word "you" in Esperanto and English, respectively, are almost never used. Results on Google have shown that ci is used less than half of one percent of the amount vi is in Esperanto. Zamenhof himself did not include the pronoun in the first book on Esperanto and only later reluctantly; later he recommended against using ci on the grounds that different cultures have conflicting traditions regarding the use of the familiar and formal forms of "you", and that a universal language should avoid the problem by simply using the formal form in all situations. Novial uses only vu as the singular "you".

² tiu, "that person", is usually used in this circumstance, because a number of people find it unnatural to use "it" referring to humans.
Apart from Ĝiism and Giism, Hiism and Riism as proposed reforms replace "Fundamento"-pronouns (ri instead of "li, ŝi, ĝi"; or "li" as utrum and hi instead of Fundamento "li"). Other proposals are variations of those four.

³iŝi, iĝi and by extension iri are proposed neologisms

The Novial system displays a systematic correspondence between singular and corresponding plural forms (i.e. vu, vus; lo, los; la, las; lu, lus; le, les). Strictly speaking "we" is not the plural of "I", because "many I’s" is nonsensical. Jespersen suggested that nu, the singular of nus, could be used as a "royal we". The optional marking of sex in Novial, especially in the third person plural, permits greater flexibility than in Esperanto, at least in this case. Exactly the same system is applied to other pronouns and to nouns with natural sex differences.

== Marking gender ==
The system of sex marking for Esperanto nouns is frequently criticised for being asymmetric and male-biased. In contrast Novial has one symmetric, unbiased system for both nouns and pronouns which marks either male, female, epicene or inanimate.

== Verbal systems ==
The grammars of Novial and Esperanto differ greatly in the way that the various tenses, moods and voices of verbs are expressed. Both use a combination of auxiliary verbs and verb endings. However, Novial uses many more auxiliary verbs and few endings, while Esperanto uses only one auxiliary verb and a greater number of verb endings.

In Novial all verb forms are independent of person (1st, 2nd or 3rd persons) and number (singular or plural). In Esperanto verb forms are independent of the person but compound tenses, with participles, require the participle (which is an adjective) to agree with the subject of the verb in number (singular or plural).

The continuous tenses are less common in both Esperanto and Novial than in English.

In the following table endings are separated from stems by hyphens. Alternative forms with the same meaning are in brackets. In the Esperanto forms (j) indicates agreement when the subject of the verb is plural.

=== Active voice ===
Active Voice
	English	Esperanto	Novial
Infinitive	(to) love	am-i	ama
Simple present	love(s)	am-as	ama
Future	will (shall) love	am-os	sal ama
Simple past	loved	am-is	did ama (ama-d)
Present perfect	have (has) loved	est-as am-int-a(j)	ha ama
Pluperfect	had loved	est-is am-int-a(j)	ha-d ama
Future perfect	will (shall) have loved	est-os am-int-a(j)	sal ha ama
Future in the past	was going to (would, should) love	est-is am-ont-a(j)	sal-ed ama
Conditional	would (should) love	am-us	vud ama
Conditional perfect	would (should) have loved	est-us am-int-a(j)	vud ha ama
First imperative	let us love!	ni am-u!	let nus ama!
Second imperative	love!	am-u!	ama!
Third imperative	let him love!	li am-u!	let lo ama!
Present continuous	is (am, are) loving	est-as am-ant-a(j)	es ama-nt
Future continuous	shall (will) be loving	est-os am-ant-a(j)	sal es ama-nt
Past continuous	was (were) loving	est-is am-ant-a(j)	did es (es-ed) ama-nt

=== Passive voice ===
The difference between the passive of becoming and the passive of being is not always immediately obvious to English speakers because their forms can often be the same. However, in English the passive of becoming is often expressed with the verb get in the sense of become as well as with the verb be.

==== Passive voice of becoming ====
Esperanto uses an appropriate form of the auxiliary verb esti (to be) followed by a passive participle (present, past or future according to sense). With many verbs Esperanto may, instead of the passive voice, use the suffix -iĝ- to form an intransitive verb of becoming, which is conjugated in the active voice (see table below).

Novial uses the auxiliary verb bli (to get, become, be from the equivalent auxiliary verb bli in Scandinavian languages) followed by the root form of the verb. The various tenses and moods are expressed regularly using the other auxiliary verbs ha, had, sal, saled and vud, the word order corresponding to the English.

Passive Voice of Becoming
	English	Esperanto	Novial
Infinitive	(to) get absorbed	est-i absorb-at-a(j) (absorb-iĝ-i)	bli absorba
Simple present	get(s) absorbed	est-as absorb-at-a(j) (absorb-iĝ-as)	bli absorba
Future	will (shall) get absorbed	est-os absorb-at-a(j) (absorb-iĝ-os)	sal bli absorba
Simple past	got absorbed	est-is absorb-at-a(j) (absorb-iĝ-is)	bli-d absorba
Past perfect	have (has) got absorbed	est-as absorb-it-a(j) (est-as absorb-iĝ-ant-a(j))	ha bli absorba
Pluperfect	had got absorbed	est-is absorb-it-a(j) (est-is absorb-iĝ-ant-a(j))	ha-d bli absorba
Future perfect	will (shall) have got absorbed	est-os absorb-it-a(j) (est-os absorb-iĝ-ant-a(j))	sal ha bli absorba
Future in the past	was going to (would, should) get absorbed	est-is absorb-ot-a(j) (est-is absorb-iĝ-ont-a(j))	sal-ed bli absorba
Conditional	would (should) get absorbed	est-us absorb-at-a(j) (absorb-iĝ-us)	vud bli absorba
Conditional perfect	would (should) have got absorbed	est-us absorb-it-a(j) (est-us absorb-iĝ-ant-a(j))	vud ha bli absorba
First imperative	let us get absorbed!	ni est-u absorb-ataj! (ni absorb-iĝ-u!)	let nus bli absorba!
Second imperative	get absorbed!	est-u absorb-at-a(j)! (absorb-iĝ-u!)	bli absorba!
Third imperative	let him get absorbed!	li est-u absorb-at-a! (li absorb-iĝ-u)	let lo bli absorba!
Present continuous	is (am, are) getting absorbed	est-as absorb-at-a(j) (est-as absorb-iĝ-ant-a(j))	es bli-nt absorba
Future continuous	shall (will) be getting absorbed	est-os absorb-at-a(j) (est-os absorb-iĝ-ant-a(j))	sal es bli-nt absorba
Past continuous	was (were) getting absorbed	est-is absorb-at-a(j) (est-is absorb-iĝ-ant-a(j))	did es (es-ed) bli-nt absorba

==== Passive voice of being ====
The passive voice of being is generally expressed in English with an appropriate form of the verb to be followed by the past participle. It is formed in the same way in Esperanto and Novial. Note that in contrast to the passive of becoming, in the Novial passive of being the auxiliary verb is followed by the past participle, which ends in -t.

Passive Voice of Being
	English	Esperanto	Novial
Infinitive	(to) be absorbed	est-i absorb-at-a(j)	es absorba-t
Simple present	is (am, are) absorbed	est-as absorb-at-a(j)	es absorba-t
Future	will (shall) be absorbed	est-os absorb-at-a(j)	sal es absorba-t
Simple past	was absorbed	est-is absorb-at-a(j)	did es (es-ed) absorba-t
Past perfect	have (has) been absorbed	est-as absorb-it-a(j)	ha es absorba-t
Pluperfect	had been absorbed	est-is absorb-it-a(j)	ha-d es absorba-t
Future perfect	will (shall) have been absorbed	est-os absorb-it-a(j)	sal ha es absorba-t
Future in the past	was going to (would, should) be absorbed	est-is absorb-ot-a(j)	sal-ed es absorba-t
Conditional	would (should) be absorbed	est-us absorb-at-a(j)	vud es absorba-t
Conditional perfect	would (should) have been absorbed	est-us absorb-it-a(j)	vud ha es absorba-t
First imperative	let us be absorbed!	ni est-u absorb-ataj!	let nus es absorba-t!
Second imperative	be absorbed!	est-u absorb-at-a(j)!	es absorba-t!
Third imperative	let him be absorbed!	li est-u absorb-at-a!	let lo es absorba-t!

== Word formation ==
In Esperanto, most words are created from a set number of roots, endings, and affixes. This allows for a comparatively low number of words to be extended to a described vocabulary, resulting in easy learning. However, some argue that results in heavy reliance on common affixes. For example, Esperanto notoriously relies heavily on the prefix mal- to form the opposite of an adjective or verb. The equivalent prefix in Novial, des-, is used to a much lesser degree.

== Language sample for comparison ==
Here is the Lord's Prayer in both languages:

Esperanto version: Patro nia, kiu estas en la ĉielo, Via nomo estu sanktigita. Venu Via regno, plenumiĝu Via volo, kiel en la ĉielo, tiel ankaŭ sur la tero. Nian panon ĉiutagan donu al ni hodiaŭ. Kaj pardonu al ni niajn ŝuldojn, kiel ankaŭ ni pardonas al niaj ŝuldantoj. Kaj ne konduku nin en tenton, sed liberigu nin de la malbono. Amen.	Novial version: Nusen Patre, kel es in siele, mey vun nome bli sanktifika, mey vun regno veni; mey on fa vun volio kom in siele anke sur tere. Dona a nus disidi li omnidiali pane, e pardona a nus nusen ofensos, kom anke nus pardona a nusen ofensantes, e non dukte nus en tentatione, ma liberisa nus fro malu. Amen.

== See also ==
- List of constructed languages
