= Lingwa de Planeta =

Constructed language based on the most widely spoken languages

- Lidepla
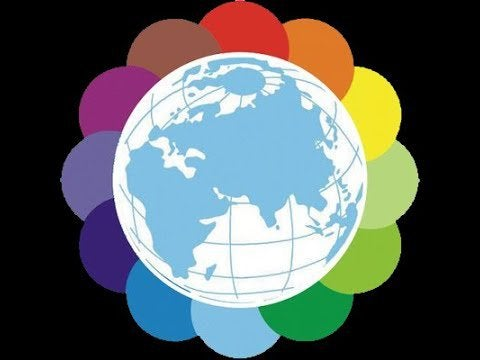
- Logo of Lingwa de Planeta
- Created by: Dimitri Ivanov, Anastasia Lysenko, etc.
- Date: 2010
- Setting and usage: International auxiliary language
- Users: 25+ (2012)
- Purpose: Constructed language: International auxiliary language; Lingwa de Planeta
- Writing system: Latin
- Sources: Vocabulary from ten representative languages, namely Arabic, Chinese, English, French, German, Hindi, Persian, Portuguese, Russian, and Spanish.

Language codes
- ISO 639-3: None (mis)
- Glottolog: None
- IETF: art-x-planeta

Lingwa de Planeta (also Lidepla or LdP) is a constructed international auxiliary language based on widely spoken languages of the world, including Arabic, Mandarin, English, French, German, Hindi, Persian, Portuguese, Russian, and Spanish.

The main idea of Lidepla is a harmonious whole on the base of the most widespread and influential national languages. The intention is also for it to have something in common with the native languages of most people. With the various source languages from across the globe, it is one of the a posteriori languages.

Development of the language began in 2006 in Saint Petersburg, Russia, by a group of enthusiasts, with Dmitri Ivanov being the project leader. The basic version of the language was published in June 2010.

== Alphabet and pronunciation ==
The official Lidepla alphabet is based on the Latin script and contains the following 25 letters, and their upper case equivalents:

Lingwa de Planeta alphabet
Letter	a	b	ch	d	e	f	g	h	i	j	k	l	m	n	o	p	r	s	t	u	v	w	x	y	z
IPA phonemes	a	b	t͡ʃ	d	e	f	g	x~h	i	d͡ʒ	k	l	m	n	o	p	r (Note: There is no preferred sound for /r/; any rhotic sound is equally acceptable.)	s	t	u	v (w)	w	k͡s~ɡ͡z (s)	i	d͡z
Name	a	be	che	de	e	ef	ge	ha	i	ja	ka	el	em	en	o	pe	er	es	te	u	ve	wa	ix (iks)	ye	ze

The letter q is not used, and c occurs only in the digraph “ch”. The letter y represents the same vowel as “i”, but is never stressed. The following digraphs and letters are pronounced as follows, with examples:

- ch – /t͡ʃ/ as in “cheese”: chay — tea
- -ng, at the end of a word – /ŋ/ as in sing: feng — wind
- sh – /ʃ/ as in “shoes”: shi — ten
- j – /d͡ʒ/ as in “Jack”: jan — to know
- z – /d͡z/: zun — to go in for
- x – /ks/ as in “extra”: examen — exam

-ng- in the middle of a word is pronounced /ŋg/ (as is “ng” in finger). v and ending -ng may alternatively be pronounced as /w/ (as in wood) and /n/ (nose), respectively. x between two vowels may be pronounced as /gs/, and x before a consonant and at the start of words may be pronounced as /s/.

Some learning material uses /h/ for the letter h. The grammar allows that pronunciation, but gives /x/ as ch in German Fach as the primary.

For more details on the phonology, see the section Phonology below.

=== Stress ===
The general rule regarding the stress is:

- the vowel before the last consonant (or “y”) is stressed: máta (mother), família (family), akshám (evening), ruchéy (brook)

Lidepla tries to preserve the original sounding of the international words, though, so there are some exceptions, as follows, in short:

- some endings (-um, -us, -er, -en; -ik-, -ul-, and most but not all suffixes) are never stressed
- the doubled vowel is always stressed (like in adyoo, “bye”)

== Description and grammar ==
The main idea behind Lidepla was to create a harmonious whole on the base of the most widespread and influential national languages of the planet. That results in the Lidepla vocabulary containing a fairly significant amount of non-European words, which makes Lidepla a world language. A general design principle for Lidepla was to have something in common with the native languages of most of the people on Earth.

The Lidepla grammar is based on three rules, the rule of the constant form, the rule of belonging to a word class, and the rule of direct word order.

=== Rule of the constant form ===
The word form never changes. Special particles are used to express the grammatical meanings, for example:

- me lubi – I love
- li lubi – they love
- yu ve lubi – you will love
- me wud lubi – I would love
- lubi (ba) – love!

The only two exceptions are:

- the plural of nouns, which is made by adding the suffix -s: kitaba (book) — kitabas (books), flor (flower) — flores (flowers), and
- the verb to be, which has its own forms:
  - bi for the indefinite
  - es for the present
  - bin for the past

=== Rule of belonging to a word class ===
Every Lidepla word belongs to a word class – noun, verb, adjective, adverb, etc. Derivation takes place by means of affixes and particles:

- lubi – to love (verb)
- luba – love (noun)
- lubi-she – loving (adjective)
- lubi-shem – lovingly, with love (adverb)

There are no fixed endings for the word classes; there are preferable ones, though. Thus, most verbs end in i, but there are some exceptions (for example: jan – to know, shwo – to talk, etc).

==== Derivation ====
By means of affixes and particles, new words can be made up, both of the same class and of the other. For example:

somni – to sleep	somni-she – sleeping
en-somni – to fall asleep	somni-shem – sleepingly, as if while asleep
somni-ki – to doze	somnishil – sleepy
gro-somni – to be dead to the world	somnilok – sleeping place
ek-somni-ki – to take a nap	somninik – sleepyhead

Affixes
Affix	Productive	Hyphenated	Stressed	Type	Added to	Creates	Meaning	Example
-ney	yes	yes		suffix	pronoun, noun	adjective	creates adjectives	mata-ney (mother's)
-ge	yes	yes		suffix	noun	noun	piece, single item	doga-ge (a single dog)
(e)s	yes	no		suffix	noun	noun	plurality (in a countable sense. Not needed if preceded by a plural quantifier like "mucho")	lingwas (languages) akshames (evenings)
man-	yes	yes		prefix	noun	noun	masculine	man-doga (male dog)
gin-	yes	yes		prefix	noun	noun	feminine	gin-doga (female dog)
o	yes	no		suffix	noun	noun	masculine	dogo (male dog)
ina	yes	no		suffix	noun	noun	feminine	dogina (female dog)
(s)a	yes	no		suffix	verb	noun	Act and its manifestation/instance/result/resulting state	ada (addition)
ing	yes	no		suffix	verb	noun	The very action as process; repeated action; occupation, hobby, sport	swiming (swimming)
(i)ka	yes	no (with monosyllabic i-verbs, -ika is added with a hyphen)	no	suffix	verb	noun	object, thing, something concrete	novika (something new, novelty) ski-ika, pi-ika
tura	yes	no		suffix	verb	noun	end result/product of action	mixtura (mixture)
wat	yes	no		suffix	verb	noun	object of action	piwat (beverage)
er	yes	no		suffix	verb, noun	noun	both doer (person) and tool/ device/appliance	zwoer (doer) politiker (politician)
or, ator	no	no		suffix			doer or tool	
-sha	yes	yes		suffix	verb	noun	doing person (noun form of the active participle marker -she)	lekti-sha (reader person)
tul	no	no		suffix	verb	noun		vintitul (screwdriver)
ista	yes	no		suffix	noun	noun	person in relation to a certain doctrine (‘ism’) or profession	dentista (dentist)

==== Principle of necessity ====
The use of a special particle is optional if its meaning is clear from the context. For example:

- Yeri me miti ela – "Yesterday, I met her", and
- Manya me miti ela – "Tomorrow, I'll meet her"

both lack particles indicating time, because it is already obvious from "yesterday" and "tomorrow". In the same manner:

- Me vidi mucho kinda – "I see a lot of children"

lacks the plural indicating ending -s, because the plural is already indicated by mucho, in contrast to:

- Me vidi kindas – "I see children"

that uses the plural "-s" ending.

=== Rule of direct word order ===
The word order in a sentence is usually direct; that is, subject — predicate — object, attribute goes before the noun, prepositions are before the noun group they refer to.

If the word order is changed, it is shown by the use of special particles. For example, den is put before the object, like this:

- Ela lubi lu – “She loves him”, versus
- Den lu ela lubi, with the same meaning (literally “Him she loves”) – where the object lu is marked by placing den before it.

=== Personal pronouns ===
The basic personal pronouns of Lidepla are:

person	singular	plural
1	me	nu
2	yu	yu
3	ta	li
3	it	li

There is a distinction in third person singular between animate and inanimate: ta is used for humans and animals (corresponding to he/him, she/her, and it when used about an animal), and it about things and objects. If the speaker wishes to distinguish gender, there is also third person singular ela (she, her) and lu (he, him).

Just as in English, second person plural (you, you all) and singular (you) are both the same word: yu. Lidepla also has an indefinite personal pronoun: oni (one, they as in “they say that...”, and “one does not...”).

==== Possessive forms ====
The short form of the possessive pronouns looks like this:

person	singular	plural
1	may	nuy
2	yur	yur
3	suy	ley

The third person singular suy is universal and can be used as the possessive form for both ta, it, ela and lu – for ela and lu, there are also the forms elay and luy.

The suffix -ney is used to form adjectives from nouns. Therefore, it is also possible to form longer possessive pronouns with the base form and the suffix -ney: mi-ney, yu-ney, etc.

=== Verbs ===
Verb roots never change in Lidepla. Verbs belong to one of two types:

Verb Types
	Type	Description	Examples
1	i-verbs	end in consonant+i	vidi — to see dumi — to think fobisi — to frighten pri — to like chi — to eat pi — to drink.
1.1	monosyllabic i-verbs	subtype, in derivation their -i is always preserved	chi — chier, chiing pi — pier, piing
2	other	Ending in anything other than consonant+i. Verbs with prefixes fa- and mah-, which contain adjectives, are type 2 verbs too: fa-syao — to diminish, become smaller (syao small) fa-muhim — to become more important (muhim important) mah-hao — make better, improve (hao good).	jan — to know gun — to work go — to go yao — to want lwo — to fall krai — to cry prei — to pray joi — to rejoice, be happy jui — to enjoy, revel in emploi — to employ kontinu — to continue.

Tense are formed by particles, or by suffixes.

Verb Forms
Tense		Formation	Meaning	Example
Present	Simple	verb		vidi (see) chi (eat) gun (work)
Present	Continuous	zai + verb		zai chi (is eating)
Present	Passive	gei + verb		gei chi (is being eaten)
Present	Conditional	wud + verb		wud chi (would eat)
Present	Perfect	he + verb		he vidi (have seen) he chi (have eaten) he gun (have worked)
Past	Simple	verb-te		vidi-te (saw) chi-te (ate) gun-te (worked)
Past	Perfect	he + verb-te		he kuki-te (had cooked)
Past	Remote	gwo + verb	some time ago, earlier in life, have been to somewhere or used to do something	
Past	Immediate	yus + verb	have just done something (the word yus means just)	
Past	Continuous	zai + verb-te		zai chi-te (was eating)
Future	Simple	ve + verb	will do something, going to do something	ve shwo (will speak)
Future	Immediate	sal + verb	to be about to do something	sal go (about to go) sal chifan (about to have a meal)
Future	Perfect	ve he + verb		ve he chi (will have eaten)
Future	Continuous	ve zai + verb		ve zai chi (will be eating)

== Vocabulary ==
Lidepla sources its vocabulary from major world languages, including among its officially declared source languages Arabic, Mandarin, English, French, German, Hindi, Persian, Portuguese, Russian, and Spanish, though words are also taken from a variety of other world languages from Turkish to Estonian. The most frequent words, though, are of English, Russian, Chinese, Arabic and Hindi origin. There are not definite endings for different parts of speech, so nearly any word can be easily incorporated. The words are adapted to Lidepla phonology and do not preserve original orthography – preserving pronunciation is prioritized over spelling.

As of 2014, the Lidepla vocabulary had about 4,000 entries, meaning about 10,000 individual words, with an increasing number. For a word to be incorporated, the following principles are taken into account:

- short words without consonant clusters are preferred
- the word has to be widespread and/or phonetically familiar for speakers of at least a few different national languages. For example, the word darba (strike), of Arabic origin, is close to Russian "удар" (udar; strike), Chinese "打" (dǎ; to strike), and even marginally to English "strike" and Hindi "प्रहार" (prāhar).

=== Similarity examples ===
Whole Lidepla phrases sometimes sound very close to national languages ones, with the same meaning:

- Brata snova dumi om to is similar to its equivalent in Russian Брат снова думает об этом (transcription: brat snova dumayet ob etom, "The brother is thinking about it again"),
- Ta bu yao shwo to Chinese 他不要说 (transliteration: "tā bù yào shuō", "They don't want to talk"),
- Way yu go bak? to English "Why do you go back?" or "Why are you going back?",
- Me jan ke mata pri pi chay to Hindi ("I know that mother likes to drink tea"), and
- Pa sabah me safari is similar to Arabic في الصباح أسافر (transcription: fi'ṣ-ṣabāḥ usāfir, "In the morning I travel").

== Phonology ==
There are 17 basic consonants (b, d, g; p, t, k; w, f; s, ʃ; x; d͡ʒ, d͡z; m, n, r, l) and 3 optional ones (v; t͡ʃ; ŋ) in Lidepla.

Distinction of the sounds w — v, d͡ʒ — t͡ʃ is not obligatory, that is they may be pronounced in the same way, as there are no minimal pairs for them. The ŋ sound is the same as in English (in -ing ending).

	Labial		Alveolar		Postalveolar		Velar	
Nasal	m		n				(ŋ)	
Stop	pʰ	b	tʰ	d			kʰ	ɡ
Affricate			d͡z		t͡ʃ	d͡ʒ		
Fricative	f	(v)	s		ʃ		x	
Approximant	w		l					
Rhotic			r					

There are 5 vowels (a, e, i, o, u) in the language.

	Front	Back
Close	i	u
Mid	e	o
Open	a	

== Development and use ==
The project is led by the psychologist Dmitri Ivanov. He laid the foundation of the language, using mainly the ideas of Otto Jespersen on the Novial language, and also the facts of Creole language development and structure, while linguists A. Vinogradova and E. Ivanova helped a lot during the early period of development. In 2007 A. Lysenko joined and became the main linguist of the project.

From the very beginning the project was open and widely discussed in a number of conlanger groups. As of 2014, more than 15 people contributed to the language considerably (that is, worked on vocabulary and grammar, translated and wrote original texts, including songs), not speaking about those who participated in discussions.

The basic version of the language was published on June 1, 2010. In some sources, the date of creation of Lidepla is stated to be 2006. It is thus important to clarify that the "basic version" of the language – that is, the version after which the basics of the language is not to be changed – was not published until 2010.

At the moment, the language is used mainly on the Internet, when it comes to direct communication. About 10–15 people have mastered the language, and about 50 can use it in communication. A lot of texts have been translated, including rather spacious texts like Alice's Adventures in Wonderland by Lewis Carroll, and Sailor Ruterford in Maori captivity by Nikolay Chukovsky (son of Korney Chukovsky; translated from Russian), and also some tales. There are songs both written and translated, including an album by musician Jonny M, and subtitles made for cartoons and movies (like the popular Russian film Ivan Vasilievich: Back to the Future).

In 2017, a request was sent to the International Organization for Standardization as an attempt to obtain an ISO 639-3 language code for Lingwa de planeta, which was rejected the next year for the language "not appearing to be used in a variety of domains nor for communication within a community that includes all ages."

== Sample text ==
Pater Noster in Lingwa de planeta:

Nuy Patra kel es pa swarga,
hay Yur nam fa-sante,
hay Yur reging lai,
hay Yur vola fulfil
i pa arda i pa swarga.

Dai ba a nu nuy pan fo jivi sedey
e pardoni ba a nu nuy deba,
kom nu pardoni toy-las kel debi a nu.
Bye dukti nu inu temta
e protekti nu fon bada.

Translation:

Our Father, which art in heaven,
Hallowed be your name,
Your kingdom come,
Your will be done
in earth, as it is in heaven.

Give us this day our daily bread
And forgive us our trespasses,
as we forgive them that trespass against us.
And lead us not into temptation
But deliver us from evil.

== Literature ==
- В. Кириллов (2012). "Лингва де планета (всепланетный language)". Журнал СПбГУ (in Russian). 13 (3855): 23–24.
- Alan Reed Libert (2013). "The Representation of Uralic Languages in Artificial International Auxiliary Languages" (PDF). Journal of Universal Language. 1 (14): 128–130. Archived from the original (PDF) on 2014-05-13.
- Alan Reed Libert (2012). "The Representation of Korean and Other Altaic Languages in Artificial International Auxiliary Languages" (PDF). Journal of Universal Language. 1 (13): 142–145. Archived from the original (PDF) on 2014-05-19.
- http://ifapcom.ru/files/Documents/multiling_eng.pdf#page=112
- Libert, Alan Reed; Moskovsky, Christo (2011). Aspects of the Grammar and Lexica of Artificial Languages (PDF). Frankfurt am Main, Berlin, Bern, Bruxelles, New York, Oxford, Wien. p. 180. ISBN 978-3-631-59678-4. Archived from the original (PDF) on 2015-09-24.
- Silvano La Lacerto Auclair (2011). "Lingwa de Planeta, ĉu hodiaŭa Esperanto?" (PDF). Riverego (in Esperanto) (105): 17–20.

=== Mass media ===
- "Вы говорите на лидепла?". Костер. январь. 2013.
- Язык будущего. Аргументы и Факты (in Russian). 40 (1665). 2012.
- О лидепла (radio report) (Петербурское радио ed.)
