= Sambahsa =

International auxiliary language

- Sambahsa-Mundialect
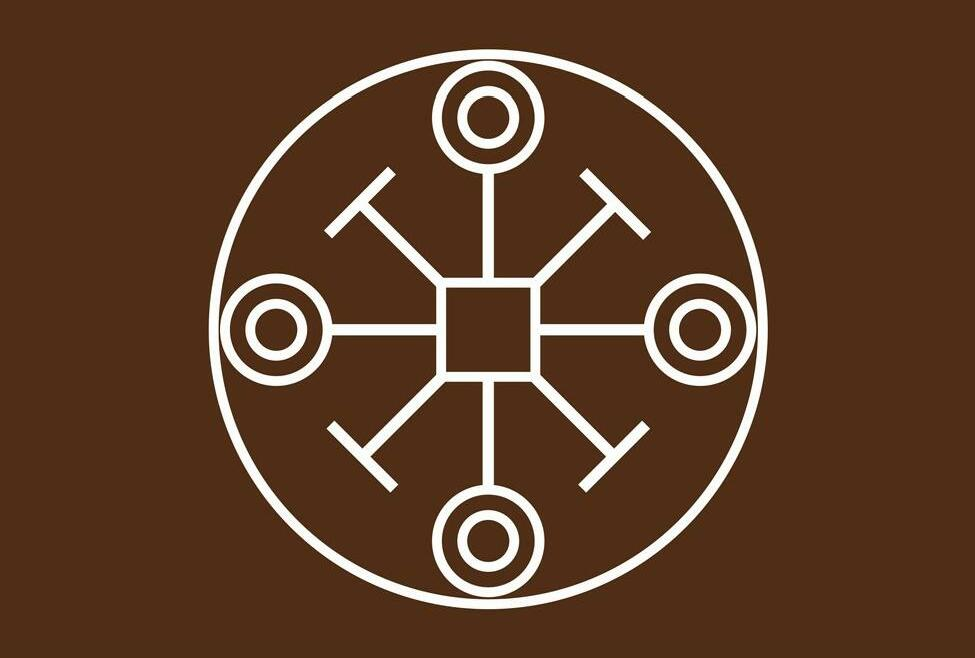
- Created by: Olivier Simon
- Date: 2007
- Purpose: Constructed language: Sambahsa

Language codes
- ISO 639-3: (sph code proposal was rejected in 2018)
- Glottolog: None
- IETF: art-x-sambahsa

Sambahsa (constructed pronunciation: [samˈbaːsa]) or Sambahsa-Mundialect is an international auxiliary language (IAL) and worldlang devised by French linguist Olivier Simon. It is based on the Proto-Indo-European language (PIE) and has a complex grammar. The language was first released on the Internet in July 2007; prior to that, the creator claims to have worked on it for eight years. According to a study addressing recent auxiliary languages, "Sambahsa has an extensive vocabulary and a large amount of learning and reference material".

The first part of the name of the language, Sambahsa, is composed of two words from the language itself, sam and bahsa, which mean 'same' and 'language', respectively. Mundialect, on the other hand, is a fusion of mundial 'worldwide' and dialect 'dialect'.

Sambahsa tries to preserve the original spellings of words as much as possible and this makes its orthography complex, though still kept regular. There are four grammatical cases: nominative, accusative, dative and genitive.

Though based on PIE, Sambahsa borrows a good proportion of its vocabulary from other language families, such as Arabic, Chinese, Indonesian, Swahili and Turkish.

== Phonology ==
Sambahsa's phonology has little to do with Proto-Indo-European phonology, though the majority of its vocabulary comes from PIE. The changes from PIE are not regular, since the creator of Sambahsa has tried to avoid homophones, which would have become common after the elimination of some PIE sounds like laryngeals or some aspirated consonants. Unlike some auxlangs like Esperanto, the orthography of Sambahsa is complex yet regular and consists only of the 26 letters of the basic Latin alphabet. This system was chosen to preserve the recognizability of words taken from West-European languages, where orthography plays a key role. For example, according to the rules of Sambahsa, bureau is pronounced as in French, and point as in English.

Sambahsa's phonemic inventory has 22 consonants and nine vowels (excluding the lengthened forms of these vowels). To help language learners, and because IPA symbols cannot be written with all keyboards, a special simpler system has been developed, called Sambahsa Phonetic Transcription, or SPT.

Compared to other conlangs, Sambahsa words are short, often as short as English words, and highly consonantic. This latter point is in accordance with the PIE background of Sambahsa, where roots have often a consonant-vocal-consonant structure.

=== Consonants ===
Consonant phonemes of Sambahsa
		Bilabial	Dental	Alveolar	Post- alveolar	Palatal	Velar	Uvular	Glottal
Nasal		m		n					
Stop	voiceless	p		t			k		
Stop	voiced	b		d			ɡ		
Affricate	voiceless			t͡s	t͡ʃ				
Affricate	voiced			d͡z	d͡ʒ				
Fricative	voiceless	f	θ	s	ʃ	ç	x		h
Fricative	voiced	v		z	ʒ			ʁ	
Approximant		w		l		j	(w)		
Trill				r					

=== Vowels ===
Vowel phonemes of Sambahsa
	Front		Central	Back
Close	i(ː)	y(ː)		u(ː)
Mid	e(ː)	ø(ː)	ə	o(ː)
Open	ɛ(ː)		a(ː)	

=== Stress ===
Sambahsa's stress rules are complex but regular, and tend to follow what is often found in German or Italian. This predictability implies that all words with the same orthography are pronounced and stressed the same way as each other. Thus, for example, while German Präsident and Italian presidente are stressed on the "ent" syllable, Sambahsa president is stressed on the "i", since president can also mean "they preside", and a final "ent" never bears the stress. This regularity of accentuation can be compared with English president and to preside, two words that bear the stress on different syllables, though they share the same origin.

== Grammar ==
=== Declensions ===
In Sambahsa, declensions are only compulsory for pronouns. The declensions of these pronouns (demonstrative/interrogative and relative/personal) are mostly parallel, and often show similarities with their Proto-Indo-European ancestors. Thus, in all Sambahsa declensions, the neuter nominative and accusative are identical, as it was the case in PIE. There are identical forms for the relative and interrogative pronouns, as well as for the third person pronoun and the definite article (the in English).

Sambahsa has two numbers (singular and plural; the dual number of PIE has not been preserved) and four grammatical genders: masculine, feminine, neuter, and undetermined. This last gender, which is an innovation from PIE, is used when a noun of uncertain or unknown gender is referred to, and, in the plural, for groups containing elements of different genders. The creator of Sambahsa introduced this non-PIE element to avoid the "gender" dispute found in Esperanto.

Gender is attributed in Sambahsa according to the "true nature" of the noun referred to, as English speakers do with he, she and it.

Sambahsa has four grammatical cases: nominative, accusative, dative and genitive; however, their attribution tries to be as logical as possible, and not arbitrary as in many modern Indo-European languages. The nominative is the case of the subject, and the form under which words are given in dictionaries. Except for verbs describing a movement or a position (where the appropriate prepositions ought to be used), all transitive verbs must introduce the accusative case in the first place, before an eventual dative case. However, the dependent clause of indirect speech is considered as a direct object, leading to verbs introducing an indirect object, even if there is no visible direct object.

Compare:

- Is mi antwehrdt od is ne gwehmsiet cras, 'He answers (to) me that he won't come tomorrow'
- Is ne mi hat antwohrden, 'He hasn't answered (to) me'

In Sambahsa, all prepositions trigger the accusative.

The genitive indicates possession, and is used after adjectives that can introduce a dependent clause.

Compare:

- Som yakin od is ghehdsiet kwehre to, 'I'm sure that he'll be able to do that'
- Som yakin eysen (genitive plural) imkans, 'I'm sure of his abilities'

For substantives and adjectives, there are declined "free endings" (i.e. non-compulsory) used most often in literary context for euphonics or poetry. This system is inspired by the euphonic endings (ʾiʿrāb) found in Modern Standard Arabic.

=== Conjugation ===
In Sambahsa, all verbs are regular, except ses ('to be'), habe ('to have'), and woide ('to know', in the meaning of French savoir or German wissen). Sambahsa verbs are indicated in dictionaries not under their infinitive form, but their bare stem, because the whole conjugation can be deduced from the form of this stem. The main tenses of Sambahsa are present and past, but many other tenses can be obtained through the use of affixes or auxiliary verbs. Sambahsa uses the following endings, which are close to those found in many Indo-European languages.

Person	Present and other tenses	Past tense only
First-person singular	-o, -m (if the verb ends with a stressed vocalic sound) or nothing (if the last vowel of the verb is unstressed)	-im
Second-person singular	-s	-(i)st(a)
Third-person singular	-t	-it
First-person plural	-m(o)s	-am
Second-person plural	-t(e)	-at
Third-person plural	-e(nt) ("-nt" is compulsory if the verb ends with a stressed vocalic sound)	-(ee)r

Sambahsa is unusual among auxlangs because of its use of a predictable ablaut system for the past tense and passive past participles. For example, eh within a verbal stem turns to oh. Other verbs that cannot use ablaut can drop their nasal infix, or use an improved version of the De Wahl's rules. Finally, the remaining verbs simply add the past tense endings, which are optional for verbs of the categories described above.

Therefore, this system qualifies Sambahsa as a language belonging to the Indo-European family of languages, though it remains a constructed language.

== Vocabulary ==
Because of its rather large vocabulary for an auxlang (as of April 2021, the full Sambahsa-English dictionary contained more than 19,500 entries), it is difficult to assess the share of each language in Sambahsa's eclectic wordstock. However, the main layers are (either reconstructed or extrapolated) Indo-European vocabulary, Greco-Roman scientific and technical vocabulary (which is not discussed below, as it is more or less comparable to what is found in English) and multiple sources extending from Western Europe to Eastern Asia.

=== Indo-European vocabulary ===
The core of Sambahsa's vocabulary is undoubtedly of Indo-European origin. Only a few Sambahsa words can be traced back to pre-Indo-European times (like kamwns, 'chamois', cf. Basque: ahuntz). Many basic Sambahsa words are thus very close to their reconstructed Indo-European counterparts. See (Sambahsa/Proto-Indo-European): eghi/*H₁eghis ('hedgehog'), ghelgh/*ghelghe- ('gland'), pehk/*pek ('to comb'), skand/*skand ('to jump'), peungst/*pn̥kʷsti- ('fist'), wobhel/*wobhel- ('weevil'), gwah/*gweH₂ ('to go'), tox/*tòksom ('yew wood' in Sambahsa; 'yew' in PIE), treb/*trêbs ('dwelling'), oit/*H₁òitos ('oath'), poti/*potis ('Sir, lord'). But less attested Indo-European vocabulary is found in Sambahsa too. For example, the common Sambahsa word for person is anghen, as in semanghen, 'someone, somebody', and can be derived from PIE *?*H₂enH₁ǵh, only found in Old Armenian anjn ('person') and Old Norse angi ('smell'). And motic ('hoe') may be a cognate of Old Church Slavonic motyka and English mattock.

=== Further development from the Indo-European background ===
Though Sambahsa, like any other conlang, has derivation rules, it sometimes uses backformation too. For example, the relation between Lithuanian bendras ('companion'), Old Greek pentheros ('father-in-law') and Sanskrit bandhu- ('companion') is uncertain; however Sambahsa "reconstructs" this root as behndwr from behnd 'to bind'. PIE has *dhéǵhom 'earth' and *dhinéǵh- (with nasal infix) 'to shape, to make pottery'; accordingly, Sambahsa has (di)ghom and dinegh, but the latter can be understood as "to put earth on" if we refer to yug ('yoke') and yuneg ('to join'), both from PIE *yugom and *yunég-.

The Sambahsa word for 'ice pellet' is kersnit; it rests on the word kersen 'frozen snow', itself from Old Norse hjarn, Lithuanian šarma ('frost') and Russian serën. But the suffix -it was abstracted from PIE words like *sepit 'grain of wheat' and *H₂elbit 'grain of barley'; thus kersnit can be understood as 'a grain of frozen snow'.

=== Words common to different language families ===
A characteristic of Sambahsa is to include words found in different language families, while the most famous auxiliary languages tend to limit themselves to a compilation of Romance vocabulary with some borrowings from the Germanic languages. For example:

- Schkaf ('cupboard') has cognates both in Germanic and Slavic languages: Russian шкаф, Polish szafa, Ukrainian шафа, Danish skab, Icelandic skápur, Franconian dialect schaaf and Swedish skåp.
- Graf ('count', as a nobility title) is a German word from Greek grapheùs that has been borrowed into many languages including Azerbaijani qraf, Bulgarian граф, Czech hrabě, Danish greve, Estonian krahv, Croatian grof, Hungarian gróf, Finnish kreivi, Lithuanian grafas, Icelandic greifi and Russian граф.
- Bicair ('mug') is found in German Becher and many other Germanic languages. It comes from Low Latin bicarium and is at the origin of Hungarian pohár, Italian bicchiere and Romanian pahar, all meaning 'glass'.
- Saray means 'big hall, palace' and has the same Turkish and Persian origin as English seraglio but with a meaning closer to its etymology and to Russian сарай ('barn').

=== The Balkan sprachbund ===
Though they belong to different language families, the languages spoken in Southeast Europe share a number of common grammatical features and of loanwords due to their historical background. That is why Sambahsa includes words from this region.

- Schut ('hornless') corresponds to Romanian șut, Bulgarian/Serbo-Croatian šut; also Albanian shut 'hornless'.
- Potire ('pitcher') comes from Old Greek ποτήρ, like Serbo-Croatian путир, Russian потир, Romanian and Albanian potir.
- Keramide ('coating') comes from Greek κεραμίδα, which has given, among others, Romanian cărămidă ('brick') and Arabic قرميدة qirmîda(t) 'tile'.

=== Words from Arabic and Persian ===
A significant part of Sambahsa's vocabulary comes from Arabic and Persian. Both languages have extensively provided loanwords to a lexical continuum ranging from the Atlantic Ocean to Indonesia because, respectively, of the spread of Islam and the brilliance of the former Persian civilization. Sambahsa learning materials often call this stratum "Muslim".

- Amlak ('assets') comes from Arabic أملاك and is found in Turkish emlak ('estate') and Persian املاک.
- Zina ('adultery') comes from Arabic زنا and is found in Persian and many other languages spoken by a majority of Muslims.
- Adarb ('merlon') comes from Spanish adarve and Portuguese adarve from Arabic درب and ultimately Persian در which has its origin in PIE *dʰwer- like Sambahsa dwer ('door').

=== Sinitic vocabulary ===
Classical Chinese has heavily influenced the wordstock of neighbouring languages, mostly Japanese, Korean and Vietnamese. As a result, Sambahsa incorporates some Sinitic vocabulary, but the phonetic differences between these various languages can be high.

- Kjingyow ('goldfish') corresponds to 金魚, which is read jīnyú in Mandarin Pinyin and kingyo in Japanese.
- Geong ('fortified palace') corresponds to the Han character 城 read chéng in Mandarin Pinyin, jō in Japanese Go-on reading, seong in Korean, and thành in Vietnamese.
- Rjienrlwey ('humankind') in an attempt to balance Mandarin rénlèi, Japanese jinrui, Korean illyu, and other renderings of 人類. This word showcases some seeming flaws of the language's approach to be reminiscent of all targeted languages at once.

Not all Sambahsa Sinitic words come from Classical Chinese. The Min Nan language of Southern China provided loanwords to some South-East Asian languages, and some of these borrowings are, in turn, found in Sambahsa.

- Sambahsa pangsit ('wonton') is an Indonesian word from Min Nan pian sit, while Mandarin Chinese (Pinyin) has húndùn.
- Likewise, Sambahsa loteng ('attic') comes from Min Nan lauteng through Indonesian loteng.

== Sample phrases ==
Sambahsa	English
Sellamat!	Hello!
Kam leitte yu?	How are you?
Leito.	Fine.
Bahte yu Sambahsa?	Do you speak Sambahsa?
No, ne bahm Sambahsa.	No, I don't speak Sambahsa.
Marba!	Pleased to meet you!

== Literature ==
Since its creation and launch on the internet in July 2007, Sambahsa-Mundialect has grown from an ambitious auxiliary language project into a medium capable of supporting a diverse literary corpus. Because the language incorporates flexible, optional literary endings and euphonic devices inspired by its Proto-Indo-European roots and Arabic-style i'rab, it provides authors and translators with the stylistic tools necessary for complex poetry and prose.

=== Early translations of classics and sacred texts ===
The initial phase of Sambahsa literature heavily emphasized translating canonical European prose, poetry, and religious works to test and showcase the language's expressive range. Early milestones included translations of Pierre Louÿs' The Songs of Bilitis (Ia Songvs as Bilitis), Hermann Hesse’s psychological novel Demian, Albert Camus' The Stranger (Is Gospoti), and Antoine de Saint-Exupéry’s philosophical classic The Little Prince (Is Lytil Prince). Translators also tackled sacred literature, producing a Sambahsa edition of The Gospel of Matthew (Id Euanghelio sekwent Matyah), alongside 19th-century realism like Gustave Flaubert’s Un Cœur simple (Un simple kerd) and Arthur Conan Doyle's detective fiction A Scandal in Bohemia (Un Scandal in Chekhia).

=== Professional publishing and genre fiction expansion ===
A major turning point in the timeline of Sambahsa publishing occurred when specialized publishing houses began issuing professional editions in the language. Most notably, Evertype published Lewis Carroll’s Alice's Adventures in Wonderland (Ia Aventures as Alice in Daumsenland) and its sequel Through the Looking-Glass in 2013, followed by Robert Louis Stevenson’s gothic masterpiece The Strange Case of Doctor Jekyll and Mister Hyde (Id Stragno Fall om Doctor Jekyll ed Poti Hyde). Building on this institutional support, community translators expanded rapidly into genre fiction, adapting weird tales and cosmic horror by H.P. Lovecraft (The Call of Cthulhu and The Moon-Bog) as well as an extensive series of sword-and-sorcery adventures by Robert E. Howard, including The Tower of the Elephant, The Scarlet Citadel, The Devil in Iron, and Black Colossus.

=== Original works and modern development ===
As the language matured, the Sambahsa literary landscape expanded beyond translation to include original works written directly by conlang enthusiasts and authors. Significant contributions to this native body of work include original books by Vicente Costalago, such as Anidros and Brens, which mark Sambahsa's transition into a living artistic medium with its own independent literary tradition.

=== Literary works translated into Sambahsa ===
- The Songs of Bilitis by Pierre Louÿs : Ia Songvs as Bilitis
- Demian by Hermann Hesse : Demian
- The Stranger by Albert Camus : Is Gospoti
- The Little Prince by Antoine de Saint-Exupéry : Is Lytil Prince
- The Gospel of Matthew : Id Euanghelio sekwent Matyah
- Alice's Adventures in Wonderland : Ia Aventures as Alice in Daumsenland and Through the Looking-Glass published by Evertype
- The Strange Case of Doctor Jekyll and Mister Hyde : Id Stragno Fall om Doctor Jekyll ed Poti Hyde published by Evertype
- Un Coeur simple by Gustave Flaubert : Un simple kerd
- The Tower of the Elephant, The Scarlet Citadel, The Devil in Iron, A Witch Shall Be Born, Jewels of Gwahlur, Shadows in Zamboula and Black Colossus by Robert E. Howard : Id Tor ios Elephant, Id Scarlato Citadell, Diabel ex Sider, Gnahsiet un Yasa, Ia Dents os Gwahlur, Zamboulas Anthropophags, Kyehrsen Coloss
- A Scandal in Bohemia by Arthur Conan Doyle : Un Scandal in Chekhia
- The Call of Cthulhu and the Moon-Bog by H. P. Lovecraft : Kal os Cthulhu, Luna-moor
- Anidros, by Vicente Costalago
- Brens, by Vicente Costalago

== Movies with Sambahsa subtitles ==
- Revelations (a fan-made movie based on Star Wars): Revelations
- The Hunt for Gollum (a fan-made prequel to the Lord of the Rings) : Sayd po Gollum
- Born of Hope (a fan-made prequel to the Lord of the Rings) : Gnaht Speh
- Home (a French movie by Yann Arthus-Bertrand about environmental threats) : Ghom
- Kaydara (a fan-made movie based on The Matrix) : Kaydara
