= Kotava =

Artificial language created in 1978

- Kotava
- Created by: Staren Fetcey
- Date: 1978
- Setting and usage: International auxiliary language
- Purpose: Constructed language: International auxiliary language; Kotava
- Sources: a priori language

Official status
- Regulated by: Linguistic committee (Kotava Avaneda)

Language codes
- ISO 639-3: avk
- Glottolog: kota1280

Kotava (sometimes also spelled Kodava) is an international auxiliary language (IAL) created by Staren Fetcey in 1978 that focuses on the principle of cultural neutrality. The name means "the language of one and all", and the Kotava community has adopted the slogan "a project humanistic and universal, utopian and realistic". The language is mainly known in French-speaking countries and most learning materials for it are in French.

== History ==
Kotava was invented by Staren Fetcey, a Canadian traveler and linguist, who began the project in the summer of 1975, on the basis of her study of previous IAL projects. The language was first made available to the public in 1978, and two major revisions were made in 1988 and 1993. Since then, the language has stabilized, with a lexicon of more than 17,000 basic roots. In 2005, a committee of seven members was established with the responsibility of guiding the future evolution of the language.

The overall goal was to create a potential IAL that was not based on a particular cultural substrate. To do this, a number of subgoals were established:

- A simple and limited phonetic system that can be pronounced easily by the majority of people.
- A simple and totally regular grammar that reflects the grammars of the majority of languages in the world.
- A clear morphology, with each morpheme having a well-defined and exclusive function.
- An a priori lexicon that does not favor any language.
- A collection of basic roots that are clearly defined and homonym-free. They are completely invented and absolutely independent of any existing language (Staren Fetcey considers the Western origin of Esperanto as a disadvantage).
- Mechanisms for productive derivation and composition to allow for maximum expressiveness, from the most general to the most subtle and precise.

== Properties ==
=== Classification ===
As an a priori constructed language, Kotava is not related to any other language, natural or constructed. The word order is very free, but current practice leans toward object–subject–verb. All objects and other complements must be introduced by prepositions. There are also innovations involving conjunctions and prepositions (its system of locative prepositions).

=== Alphabet ===
Kotava is written with the Latin alphabet but does not use the letters H or Q. The letter H, which was used only to palatalize a preceding L, M, or N, was eliminated and replaced by the letter Y in all cases. The only diacritic is an acute accent indicating stress on the final vowel in the first person of verbs. Like in French, a space is added between text and exclamation or question marks.

=== Phonology ===
In Kotava, there are no irregular pronunciations; the sound is always predictable from the spelling and vice versa.

Most consonants are pronounced as in the IPA, except for ⟨c⟩, pronounced [ʃ]; ⟨j⟩, pronounced [ʒ]; and ⟨y⟩, pronounced [j].

The consonants (in IPA form) are:

	Labial		Alveolar		Post- alveolar		Velar	
Nasal	m		n					
Plosive	p	b	t	d			k	ɡ
Fricative	f	v	s	z	ʃ	ʒ	x	
Trill			r					
Approximant			l		j		w	

The vowels are pronounced as in Spanish, Swahili, or Tahitian, with no differences of length and no nasalization.

	Front	Back
Close	i	u
Mid	e	o
Open	a	

There are five diphthongs: ay, ey, iy (very rare), oy, and uy (very rare).

The stress rule in Kotava is regular for all polysyllabic words: on the last syllable (ultima) if the word has a final consonant; on the second-last syllable (penult) if the word has a final vowel except for the first person of conjugated verbs, which is stressed on the last syllable and marked with an acute accent.

=== Morphology ===
Kotava has strict morphological rules, which are outlined in a table that prescribes order and interaction. All parts of speech are marked and so there is no ambiguity. Nouns and pronouns are invariable, and there is no system of declensions. There are no affixes of gender or plurality, both of which can be indicated with particles or other words if necessary. One unusual feature of Kotava is the "euphonic" principle, which matches endings of adjectives and other modifiers with their nouns.

=== Grammar ===
==== Pronouns ====
The main personal pronouns are the following:

	singular			plural			
	1st	2nd	3rd	1st	2nd	3rd	4th
Kotava	jin	rin	in	min	win	sin	cin
English	I	you	he/she/it	we (incl.)	you	they	we (excl.)

The reflexive pronoun is int, and the reciprocal pronoun is sint. Possessives are created by adding -af to the personal pronoun.

Other pronouns include coba (thing), tan (unknown person), tel (known person), and tol (one of two).

==== Verbs ====
Verbs are conjugated into three tenses (present, past, and future) and four moods (realis, imperative, conditional, and relative). In addition, there are mechanisms for voices, aspects, modalities and other nuances, which permit a great deal of subtlety in expression. There are seven persons for verbs, including an inclusive and exclusive first-person plural.

The first person singular is used as the verb's lemma. Suffixes to the root indicate person and tense. The following table exemplifies that with the verbs tí (to be) and estú (to eat):

singular			plural			
1st	2nd	3rd	1st incl.	2nd	3rd	1st excl.
´	-l	-r	-t	-c	-d	-v
tí ("I am")	til ("you are")	tir ("he/she/it is")	tit ("we (inclusive) are")	tic ("you are")	tid ("they are")	tiv ("we (exclusive) are")
estú ("I eat")	estul ("you eat")	estur ("he/she/it eats")	estut ("we (inclusive) eat")	estuc ("you eat")	estud ("they eat")	estuv ("we (exclusive) eat")

The following modifiers can be used before the verb:

Name	Function	Example
en	emphasis	en estú ("I do eat")
rotir	possibility	in rotir estur ("he possibly eats")
me	negative	me estú ("I don't eat")
men	pre-fact negative	koe Paris men irubá ("I don't live in Paris yet")
mea	post-fact negative	koe Paris mea irubá ("I don't live in Paris any more")

The past tense is indicated by a -y- interfix before the verb's final vowel:

- danká ("I sing") → dankayá ("I sang")

Similarly, the future tense is indicated by a -t- interfix:

- estul ("you eat") → estutul ("you will eat")

==== Nouns ====
There is no grammatical gender. To indicate the sex or gender of a person or animal, -ya is used for females and -ye for males.

none	-ya	-ye
krapol ("lion of either sex")	krapolya ("lioness")	krapolye ("male lion")
ayik ("human")	ayikya ("woman")	ayikye ("man")

=== Voice ===
Kotava has five grammatical voices:

1. active - doalié (I fight)
2. passive - zo doalié (I am fought)
3. reflexive - va int tcaté (I wash myself)
4. reciprocal - va sint disuked (they look at each other)
5. complementary - va lupa mbi zilí (I am given a cake)

=== Numbers ===
Numbers take the form of radical prefixes, which can be suffixed with certain attributes:

- 0 ned-
- 1 tan-
- 2 tol-
- 3 bar-
- 4 balem-
- 5 alub-
- 6 tev-
- 7 per-
- 8 anyust-
- 9 lerd-
- 10 san-
- 100 decem-
- 1000 decit-
- 10 000 kun-
- 100 000 vunt-
- 1 000 000 celem-
- 1 000 000 000 felem-
- 10^{12} tung-
- 10^{15} pung-
- 10^{18} eung-
- 10^{21} zung-
- 10^{24} yung-

Suffixes:

- -oy (cardinal numbers)
- -eaf (ordinal numbers)
- -da (years)
- -ka (days)
- jon- ... -af (multiplied by)
- fuxe- ... -af (divided by)
- vol- (negative numbers)

Mathematical signs:

- = dum (equals)
- + do (plus)
- - bas (minus)
- × jon (times)
- / fuxe (divided by)

== Literature ==
Literature has an important place in the Kotava-speaking community. There are hundreds of translations of novels (Leo Tolstoy, Émile Zola, Guy de Maupassant, Octave Mirbeau, Albert Camus, Molière, Mikhail Sholokhov, Antoine de Saint-Exupéry, Victor Hugo, etc.), tales (La Fontaine, Charles Perrault, Brothers Grimm, Hans Christian Andersen, legends of the world) and other literary texts (Machiavelli, etc.).

== In popular culture ==
In Les Tétraèdres ("The Tetrahedra", a novel in French by Yurani Andergan, Verintuva, ISBN 978-2-9536310-0-5, 1274 p.), a wide historical and fantastic fresco, Kotava is the spoken language that Neanderthals transmitted in secret to their descendants for many generations and is recited by some heroines as long oracles. There are additional translations at the end.

== Sample texts ==
From "The Princess and the Pea" by Hans Christian Andersen:

Lekeon tiyir sersikye djukurese va sersikya, va sersanyikya. Ta da vaon trasir, va tawava anamelapiyir vexe kotviele koncoba me dojeniayar; sersikya, jontika tiyid, vexe kas tiyid sersanyikya ? Batcoba tiyir voldrikafa karolara, kotviele koncoba ok arcoba nuvelayad mekotunafa. Gabenapaf in dimdenlapiyir, va sersanyikya loeke co-djudiyir.

Once upon a time there was a prince who wanted to marry a princess; but she would have to be a real princess. He travelled all over the world to find one, but nowhere could he get what he wanted. There were princesses enough, but it was difficult to find out whether they were real ones. There was always something about them that was not as it should be. So he came home again and was sad, for he would have liked very much to have a real princess.

The Lord's Prayer:

Kotava	English
Cinaf Gadik koe kelt tigis,	Our Father who is in heaven,
Rinaf yolt zo tutumtar,	Hallowed be your name,
Rinafa gazara artfir,	Your kingdom come,
Rinafa kuranira	Your will be done
moe tawava lidam kelt zo askir.	On Earth, as it is in heaven.
Va vieleaf beg pu cin re zilil	Give us today our daily bread
va kota cinafa kantara ixel	and forgive us our debts,
dum pu bagesik dere ixev.	as we also have forgiven our debtors.
Ise gu zoenuca va cin me levplekul,	And do not bring us into temptation
Volse gu rote va cin tunuyal.	but rescue us from the evil.

The Universal Declaration of Human Rights:
Kot ayik sokoblir nuyaf is miltaf gu bagaliuca is rokeem. Va ova is jiluca sodir isen kottan is artan va sint beron gotegid.

All human beings are born free and equal in dignity and rights. They are endowed with reason and conscience and should act towards one another in a spirit of brotherhood.

== Sources ==
- Fetcey, Staren (1979). Kotava, langue internationale neutre. Québec, Canada : Ed. Univers des langues T.B. INC. 148 p.
- Kotava Avaneda (Kotava linguistic committee). Official grammar of Kotava {PDF}; Official grammar of Kotava (French) {PDF}. Kotava Organisation (March 2007, version III.8, 49 p.; March 2013, v.III–14, 59 p.)
- Christo Moskovsky & Alan Reed Libert (2011). Aspects of the Grammar and Lexica of Artificial Languages. Peter Lang GmbH. ISBN 978-3631596784
