= The Moon-Bog =

1921 short story by H. P. Lovecraft

- Short story by H. P. Lovecraft
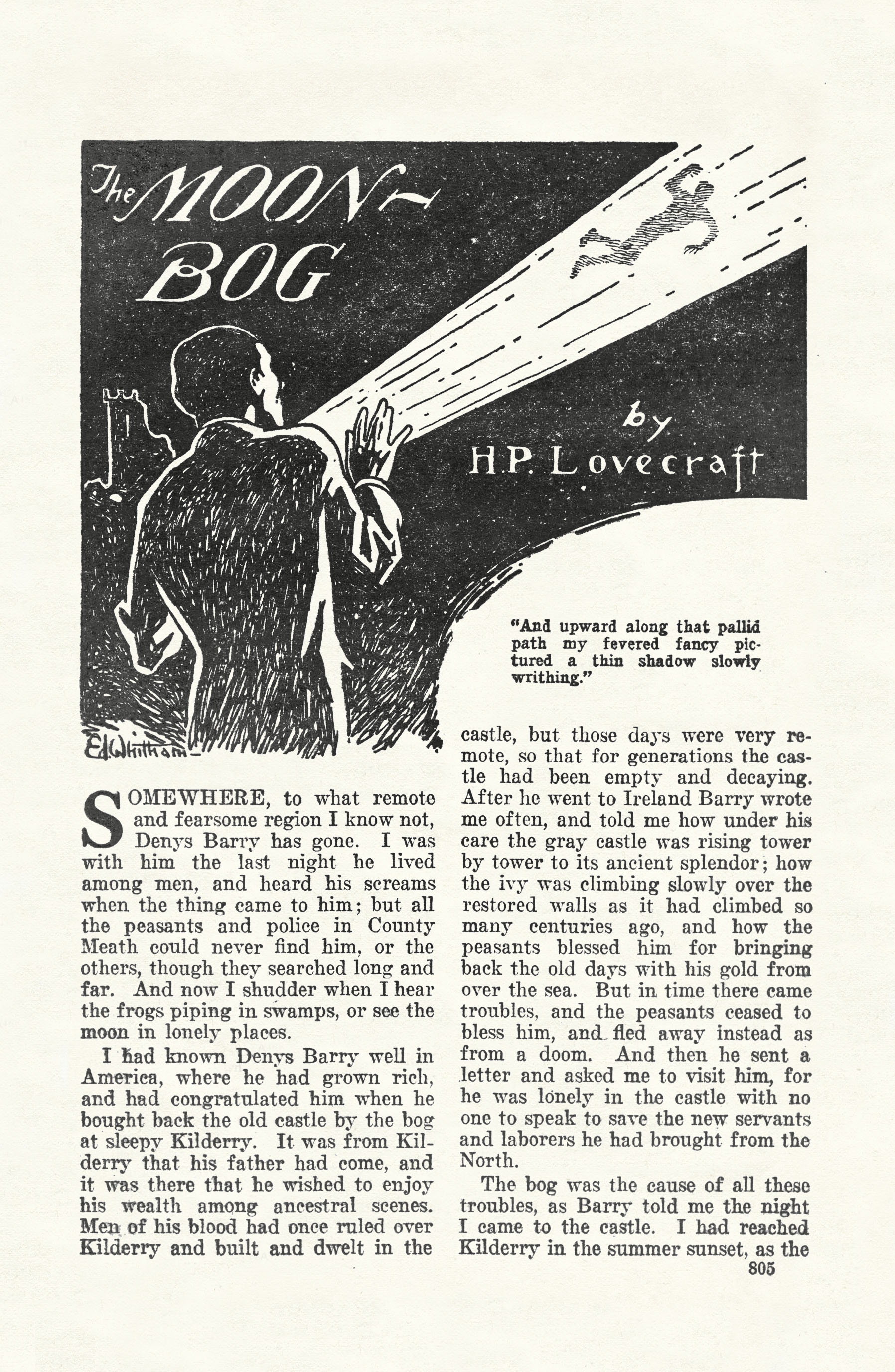
- Title page of "The Moon-Bog" as it appeared in Weird Tales, June 1926. Illustration by Ed Whitham.

Text available at Wikisource
- Country: United States
- Language: English
- Genre: Horror

Publication
- Published in: Weird Tales
- Media type: Print (magazine)
- Publication date: June 1926

"The Moon-Bog" is a short story by American horror fiction writer H. P. Lovecraft, written in or before March 1921. The story was first published in the June 1926 issue of the pulp magazine Weird Tales.

== Plot summary ==
In the story, the unnamed narrator describes the final fate of his good friend, Denys Barry, an Irish-American who reclaims an ancestral estate in Kilderry, a fictional village in Ireland. Barry ignores pleas from the superstitious local peasantry not to drain the nearby bog, with unfortunate supernatural consequences.

== Background ==
The story was written at speed and to order, for oral delivery as an after-supper "shocker" for a Hub Club gathering of amateur journalists in Boston on March 10, 1921. The meeting had a St. Patrick's Day theme, and so required an Irish setting. "The Moon-Bog" is described by S. T. Joshi and David E. Schultz as "one of the most conventionally supernatural in HPL's oeuvre."

As with many of Lovecraft's stories, "The Moon-Bog" has strong elements of his own autobiography woven into it. Like Barry, Lovecraft had dreams of buying back his ancestors' home in England, and of reclaiming his standing among the landed gentry. The same theme is treated with greater depth in Lovecraft's more substantial story "The Rats in the Walls" (1923). There is also a further autobiographical element in "The Moon-Bog" – Lovecraft had seen his boyhood haunt of Cat Swamp purchased by the city authorities with the declared aim of protecting it from developers. But instead the city allowed it to be drained for development, and 200 new houses were erected on the site in 1919.

In his story Lovecraft leans on authentic Irish legend, that of the first invaders of Ireland, the Partholonians – and the sudden plague that wiped them out in around 1200 BC. He also leans on the belief, then very common and persistent among the Irish, of the Mediterranean origins of the Irish race and that the Partholonians had "originally come from Greece".

The story bears a similarity in its theme and approach to Lord Dunsany's later Irish novel The Curse of the Wise Woman (1933), although S. T. Joshi discounts the possibility of any influence of Lovecraft on Dunsany.

In 2022, a short subject documentary about the story and Lovecraft's relationship to Ireland entitled "H.P. Lovecraft and the Moon Bog" received its premiere at the HP Lovecraft Film Festival in Portland, Oregon.

== See also ==
- The Book of Invaders
- Tallaght
- Nemed
