= Novial =

Constructed language

- novial
- Created by: Otto Jespersen
- Date: 1928
- Setting and usage: International auxiliary language
- Purpose: Constructed language: International auxiliary language; Novial
- Sources: Romance and Germanic languages; also Interlingue and Ido

Language codes
- ISO 639-3: nov
- Glottolog: novi1234
- Linguasphere: 51-AAB-dc

Novial is an international auxiliary language (IAL) created by Danish linguist Otto Jespersen in 1928. It was designed to facilitate communication between speakers of different native languages. The name of the language is an acronymic compound of the Novial word novi (meaning 'new') and IAL.

Jespersen had been an early supporter of another international auxiliary language, Ido, a reformed version of Esperanto, before leaving to create his own language in 1928.

Novial's vocabulary is borrowed largely from the Romance and Germanic languages, while its analytic grammar is influenced by English.

Novial was introduced in Jespersen's book An International Language in 1928. It was updated in his dictionary Novial Lexike in 1930, and further modifications were proposed in the 1930s, but the language became dormant with Jespersen's death in 1943.

== Phonology ==
=== Consonants ===
| | Labial | | Coronal | | Palatal | | Velar | | Glottal |
|---|---|---|---|---|---|---|---|---|---|
| Nasal | m | | n | | | | (ŋ) | | |
| Plosive/ Affricate | p | b | t | d | tʃ | dʒ | k | ɡ | |
| Fricative | f | v | s | | ʃ | (ʒ) | | | h |
| Approximant | (w) | | l | | j | | | | |
| Rhotic | | | r | | | | | | |

=== Vowels ===
| | Front | Back |
|---|---|---|
| Close | i | u |
| Mid | e | o |
| Open | a | |

=== Stress ===
The basic rule is: stress the vowel before the last consonant. However, consonantal flexional endings (ie. -d, -m, -n, -s) do not count for this (e.g. bóni but bónim, not boním; apérta but apértad, not apertád), so perhaps it is better to say that the vowel before the final consonant of the stem takes the stress.

== Orthography ==
Novial alphabet
| Upper case | A | B | C | D | E | F | G | H | I | J | K | L | M | N | O | P | Q | R | S | T | U | V | X | Y | Z |
| Lower case | a | b | c | d | e | f | g | h | i | j | k | l | m | n | o | p | q | r | s | t | u | v | x | y | z |
| IPA phonemes | a | b | k, s et al. (Note: Only used in proper names and international symbols.) | d | e | f | g | h | i | dʒ, ʒ | k | l | m | n | o | p | k (Note: Only used in the qu digraph.) | r | s | t | u | v | ks, gz | j, ʝ | ts, z et al. |

The digraphs ch and sh represent [t͡ʃ] or [ʃ], depending on the speaker. For example, chokolate would be pronounced either /t͡ʃokoˈlate/ or /ʃokoˈlate/. w is not used.

== Grammar ==
Like many constructed IALs, Novial has a simple and regular grammar. The main word order is SVO, which removes the need for marking the object of a sentence with accusative case (since the position normally tells what word is the object). There is however a way to mark accusative. There is no grammatical gender (but the sex or gender of referents can be marked). Verbs are conjugated regularly, without agreement (according to person or number).

Nouns mainly end in e, a, o, u or um in the singular. There are definite forms of nouns marked with an article, and singular and plural forms, where the plural is marked with the suffix -s after vowels or -es after consonants. There is also a form for indefinite number (as in Mandarin Chinese and Japanese), expressed by removing the ending of the noun in the singular (leone – lion, leon es kruel – 'a/the lion is cruel', or 'lions are cruel').

If a noun refers to a living being, then the form ending in -e is neutral with regard to sex, feminine when ending in -a, and masculine when ending in -o. If based on an adjective, a noun referring to a living being can be made with the previously mentioned rule, and furthermore nouns referring to concrete objects with -u, and abstractions with -um. The third-person pronouns follow the same rule, together with the definite article.

Referring to an instrument – a tool or a means – a word that ends in -e is the tool or the means itself, a word that ends in -a is a verb describing usage of the tool and so on, and a word that ends in -o is a noun describing the act of using it:

rule – rula – rulo
roll – {(to) roll} – {(a) rolling}

mesure – mesura – mesuro
{measure (the tool)} – {(to measure)} – measurement

=== Personal pronouns ===
| Person | | Singular | Plural |
|---|---|---|---|
| 1st | | me | nus |
| 2nd | | vu | vus |
| 3rd | Common | le | les |
| 3rd | Masculine | lo | los |
| 3rd | Feminine | la | las |
| 3rd | Neuter | lu | lus |

The standard word order in Novial is subject–verb–object, as in English. Therefore, the object need not be marked to distinguish it from the subject, and nominative (corresponding to I, he, she and so on) and accusative (corresponding to me, him, us, etc.) pronouns are identical:

me observa vu
I observe you

vu observa me
you observe me

The accusative (direct object) is therefore most often identical to the nominative (subject). However, for avoiding ambiguity, an optional accusative ending, -m (-em after a consonant), is available; it is rarely used. The preposition em is equivalent to this ending.

The genitive personal pronouns – whether dependent or independent (corresponding to my, their, etc., or to mine, theirs, etc., respectively) – are formed by adding -n or after a consonant -en:

Men hunde
My dog

Li hunde es men
The dog is mine

The genitive pronouns are thus men, vun, len, etc., lun and nusen, vusen, lesen etc. and lusen. Such a relationship may also be expressed with the preposition de: de me, de vu, and so on.

The reflexive pronoun is se: lo admira se – 'he admires himself'. The generic personal pronoun (similar to the English one) is on, with the genitive form onen.

=== Verbs ===
Verb forms never change with person or number. Most verb tenses, moods and voices are expressed with auxiliary verbs preceding the root form of the main verb. The auxiliaries follow the same word order as the English equivalent. The following are examples of the verb forms:

| Grammar | English | Novial |
|---|---|---|
| Infinitive | to protect | protekte |
| Present | I protect | me protekte |
| Present Perfect | I have protected | me ha protekte |
| Past Simple | I protected | me did protekte or me protekted |
| Past Perfect | I had protected | me had protekte |
| Future | I shall protect or I will protect | me sal protekte or me ve protekte |
| Future Perfect | I shall have protected or I will have protected | me sal ha protekte or me ve ha protekte |
| Future in the Past | I was going to protect | me saled protekte |
| Conditional | I would protect | me vud protekte |
| Conditional Perfect | I would have protected | me vud ha protekte |
| First-person Jussive | Let me protect! | Let me protekte! |
| Second-person Imperative | Protect! | protekte! |

- Present active participle: protektent – 'protecting'
- Past passive participle: protektet – 'protected'

Novial clearly distinguishes the passive of becoming and the passive of being. In English, the forms are often the same, using the auxiliary verb be followed by the past participle. However, the passive of becoming is also often expressed with the verb get, which is used in the examples below.

The passive voice of becoming is formed with the auxiliary bli followed by the root verb form. It can then be conjugated into the previously mentioned forms, for example:

| Grammar | English | Novial |
|---|---|---|
| Infinitive | to get protected | bli protekte |
| Present | I get protected | me bli protekte |
| Present Perfect | I have got protected | me ha bli protekte |
| Past Simple | I got protected | me blid protekte |
| Past Perfect | I had got protected | me had bli protekte |
| Future | I shall get protected or I will get protected | me sal bli protekte or me ve bli protekte |
| Conditional | I would get protected | me vud bli protekte |

The passive voice of being is formed with the auxiliary es followed by the past passive participle (stem + -t). For example:

| Grammar | English | Novial |
|---|---|---|
| Infinitive | to be protected | es protektet |
| Present | I am protected | me es protektet |
| Present Perfect | I have been protected | me ha es protektet |
| Past Simple | I was protected | me did es protektet or me esed protektet |
| Past Perfect | I had been protected | me had es protektet |
| Future | I shall be protected or I will be protected | me sal es protektet or me ve es protektet |
| Conditional | I would be protected | me vud es protektet |

=== Articles ===
The definite article is li, which is invariant. It is used as in English.

There is no indefinite article, although un ('one') can be used.

=== Nouns ===
The plural noun is formed by adding –s to the singular (-es after a consonant).

The accusative case is generally identical to the nominative but can optionally be marked with the ending -m (-em after a consonant) with the plural being -sem (-esem after a consonant) or with the preposition em.

The genitive is formed with the ending -n (-en after a consonant) with the plural being -sen (-esen after a consonant) or with the preposition de.

Other cases are formed with prepositions.

=== Adjectives ===
All adjectives end in -i, but this may be dropped if it is easy enough to pronounce and no confusion will be caused. Adjectives precede the noun qualified. Adjectives do not agree with the noun, but may be given noun endings if there is no noun present to receive them.

Comparative adjectives are formed by placing various particles (plu, tam, and min) in front of the adjective receiving the comparison. Likewise, the superlative particles (maxim and minim) precede the adjective. The adjective does not receive an inflection to its ending.

=== Adverbs ===
An adjective is converted to a corresponding adverb by adding -m after the -i ending of the adjective.

Comparative and superlative adverbs are formed in the same manner as comparative and superlative adjectives: by placing a specific particle before the adverb receiving the comparison.

== Vocabulary ==
=== Affixes ===
See the Table of Prefixes and Table of Suffixes at the Novial Wikibook.

== Novial compared to Esperanto and Ido ==
Jespersen was a professional linguist, unlike Esperanto's creator. He disliked the arbitrary and artificial character that he found in Esperanto and Ido. Additionally, he objected to those languages' inflectional systems, which he found needlessly complex. He sought to make Novial at once euphonious and regular, while also preserving useful structures from natural languages.

In Novial:

- Syntax is largely a matter of word order, as in English and modern Scandinavian languages. There is no obligatory accusative marker as in Esperanto, but the accusative may optionally be marked with either an accusative ending or a preposition.
- A genitive (or "possessive") case is available as an alternative to the preposition de. This is based on Jespersen's observation that many modern languages have lost complex noun inflections, yet retain a genitive form.
- Auxiliary particles express most verb tenses. An inflectional ending is available as a shorthand for the simple past tense.

A major difference between Novial and Esperanto/Ido concerns noun endings. Jespersen rejected a single vowel to terminate all nouns (-o in Esperanto/Ido), finding it unnatural and potentially confusing. Instead, Novial nouns may end in -o, -a, -e, or -u or -um. These endings may be taken to indicate natural sex according to the custom in Romance languages, though there is no grammatical gender or requirement for adjectives to agree with nouns.

== Language sample for comparison ==
Here is the Lord's Prayer in Novial and several related languages:

| Novial version: | Esperanto version: | Ido version: | Latin version: |
|---|---|---|---|
| Nusen Patre, kel es in siele, mey vun nome bli sanktifika, mey vun regno veni; mey on fa vun volio kom in siele anke sur tere. Dona a nus disdi li omnidiali pane, e pardona a nus nusen ofensos, kom anke nus pardona a nusen ofensantes, e non dukte nus en tentatione, ma liberisa nus fro malu. Amen. | Patro nia, kiu estas en la ĉielo, Via nomo estu sanktigita. Venu Via regno, plenumiĝu Via volo, kiel en la ĉielo, tiel ankaŭ sur la tero. Nian panon ĉiutagan donu al ni hodiaŭ. Kaj pardonu al ni niajn ŝuldojn, kiel ankaŭ ni pardonas al niaj ŝuldantoj. Kaj ne konduku nin en tenton, sed liberigu nin de la malbono. Amen. | Patro nia, qua esas en la cielo, tua nomo santigesez; tua regno advenez; tua volo facesez quale en la cielo tale anke sur la tero. Donez a ni cadie l'omnadia pano, e pardonez a ni nia ofensi, quale anke ni pardonas a nia ofensanti, e ne duktez ni aden la tento, ma liberigez ni del malajo. Amen. | Pater noster, qui es in caelis: sanctificetur Nomen Tuum; adveniat Regnum Tuum; fiat voluntas Tua, sicut in caelo, et in terra. Panem nostrum cotidianum da nobis hodie; et dimitte nobis debita nostra, Sicut et nos dimittimus debitoribus nostris; et ne nos inducas in tentationem; sed libera nos a Malo. Amen. |

== Criticism ==
As Jespersen relates in his autobiography, in 1934 he proposed an orthographic reform to Novial, which displeased a faction of the users. Jespersen abandoned the essential principle of one sound, one letter:

I proposed some not inconsiderable amendments, especially by introducing an "orthographic" Novial alongside the original phonetically written language. (...) Thus the sound [k], besides being represented by the letters k and q and the first part of x, also acquired the new sign c (before a, o, u and consonants), a practice with which nearly all Europeans, Americans, and Australians are familiar from childhood. (...) I know that this orthographic form has displeased several of Novial's old and faithful friends, but it is my impression that many others have applauded it.

Some of Jespersen's colleagues among philologists jokingly referred to Novial as Jesperanto, combining his surname with Esperanto, the prototypical auxiliary language.

== See also ==
- Comparison between Esperanto and Novial
- Comparison between Ido and Novial
