= International auxiliary language =

Constructed language meant to facilitate communication

An international auxiliary language (Note: The term was used at least as early as 1908, by Otto Jespersen.) (sometimes acronymized as IAL or contracted as auxlang) is a language meant for communication between people from different nations who do not share a common first language. An auxiliary language is primarily a second language and often a constructed language. The concept is related to but separate from the idea of a lingua franca (or dominant language) that people must use to communicate. The study of international auxiliary languages is interlinguistics.

The term "auxiliary" implies that it is intended to be an additional language for communication between the people of the world, rather than to replace their native languages. Often, the term is used specifically to refer to planned or constructed languages proposed to ease international communication, such as Esperanto, Ido and Interlingua. It usually takes words from widely spoken languages. However, it can also refer to the concept of such a language being determined by international consensus, including even a standardized natural language (e.g., International English), and has also been connected to the project of constructing a universal language.

Languages of dominant societies over the centuries have served as lingua francas that have sometimes approached the international level. Latin, Greek, Sanskrit, Persian, Tamil, and the Mediterranean Lingua Franca were used in the past. In recent times, Standard Arabic, Standard Chinese, English, French, German, Italian, Portuguese, Russian, and Spanish have been used as such in many parts of the world. However, as lingua francas are traditionally associated with the very dominance—cultural, political, and economic—that made them popular, they are often also met with resistance. For this and other reasons, some have turned to the idea of promoting a constructed language as a possible solution, by way of an "auxiliary" language, such as Esperanto.

== History ==
The use of an intermediary auxiliary language (also called a "working language", "bridge language", "vehicular language", or "unifying language") to make communication possible between people not sharing a first language, in particular when it is a third language, distinct from both mother tongues, may be almost as old as language itself. Certainly they have existed since antiquity. Latin and Greek (or Koine Greek) were the intermediary language of all areas of the Mediterranean; Akkadian, and then Aramaic, remained the common languages of a large part of Western Asia through several earlier empires. Such natural languages used for communication between people not sharing the same mother tongue are called lingua francas.

=== Lingua francas (natural international languages) ===
Lingua francas have arisen around the globe throughout human history, sometimes for commercial reasons (so-called "trade languages") but also for diplomatic and administrative convenience, and as a means of exchanging information between scientists and other scholars of different nationalities. The term originates with one such language, Mediterranean Lingua Franca, a pidgin language used as a trade language in the Mediterranean area from the 11th to the 19th century. Examples of lingua francas remain numerous, and exist on every continent. The most obvious example as of the early 21st century is English. Moreover, a special case of English is that of Basic English, a simplified version of English which shares the same grammar (though simplified) and a reduced vocabulary of only 1,000 words, with the intention that anyone with a basic knowledge of English should be able to understand even quite complex texts.

=== Constructed languages ===
Since all natural languages display a number of irregularities in grammar that make them more difficult to learn, and they are also associated with the national and cultural dominance of the nation that speaks it as its mother tongue, attention began to focus on the idea of creating an artificial or constructed language as a possible solution. The concept of simplifying an existing language to make it an auxiliary language was already in the Encyclopédie of the 18th century, where Joachim Faiguet de Villeneuve, in the article on Langue, wrote a short proposition of a "laconic" or regularized grammar of French.

Some of the philosophical languages of the 17th–18th centuries could be regarded as proto-auxlangs, as they were intended by their creators to serve as bridges among people of different languages as well as to disambiguate and clarify thought. However, most or all of these languages were, as far as can be told from the surviving publications about them, too incomplete and unfinished to serve as auxlangs (or for any other practical purpose). The first fully developed constructed languages we know of, as well as the first constructed languages devised primarily as auxlangs, originated in the 19th century; Solresol by François Sudre, a language based on musical notes, was the first to gain widespread attention although not, apparently, fluent speakers.

==== Volapük ====
A bewildering variety of IAL's were proposed in the 19th century; Louis Couturat and Léopold Leau in Histoire de la langue universelle (1903) reviewed 38 such projects.

Volapük, first described in an article in 1879 by Johann Martin Schleyer and in book form the following year, was the first to garner a widespread international speaker community. Three major Volapük conventions were held, in 1884, 1887, and 1889; the last of them used Volapük as its working language. André Cherpillod writes of the third Volapük convention,

In August 1889 the third convention was held in Paris. About two hundred people from many countries attended. And, unlike in the first two conventions, people spoke only Volapük. For the first time in the history of mankind, sixteen years before the Boulogne convention, an international convention spoke an international language.

However, not long after, the Volapük speaker community broke up due to various factors including controversies between Schleyer and other prominent Volapük speakers, and the appearance of newer, easier-to-learn constructed languages, primarily Esperanto.

==== Idiom Neutral and Latino sine flexione ====
Answering the needs of the first successful artificial language community, the Volapükists established the regulatory body of their language, under the name International Volapük Academy (Kadem bevünetik volapüka) at the second Volapük congress in Munich in August 1887. The Academy was set up to conserve and perfect the auxiliary language Volapük, but soon conflicts arose between conservative Volapükists and those who wanted to reform Volapük to make it a more naturalistic language based on the grammar and vocabulary of major world languages. In 1890 Schleyer himself left the original Academy and created a new Volapük Academy with the same name, from people completely loyal to him, which continues to this day.

Under Waldemar Rosenberger, who became the director in 1892, the original Academy began to make considerable changes in the grammar and vocabulary of Volapük. The vocabulary and the grammatical forms unfamiliar to Western Europeans were completely discarded, so that the changes effectively resulted in the creation of a new language, which was named "Idiom Neutral". The name of the Academy was changed to Akademi Internasional de Lingu Universal in 1898 and the circulars of the Academy were written in the new language from that year.

In 1903, the mathematician Giuseppe Peano published his completely new approach to language construction. Inspired by the idea of philosopher Gottfried Wilhelm Leibniz, instead of inventing schematic structures and an a priori language, he chose to simplify an existing and once widely used international language, Latin. This simplified Latin, devoid of inflections and declensions, was named Interlingua by Peano but is usually referred to as "Latino sine flexione".

Impressed by Peano's Interlingua, the Akademi Internasional de Lingu Universal effectively chose to abandon Idiom Neutral in favor of Peano's Interlingua in 1908, and it elected Peano as its director. The name of the group was subsequently changed to Academia pro Interlingua (where Interlingua stands for Peano's language). The Academia pro Interlingua survived until about 1939. It was Peano's Interlingua that partly inspired the better-known Interlingua presented in 1951 by the International Auxiliary Language Association (IALA).

==== Esperanto ====
After the emergence of Volapük, a wide variety of other auxiliary languages were devised and proposed in the 1880s–1900s, but none except Esperanto gathered a significant speaker community. Esperanto was developed from about 1873–1887 (a first version was ready in 1878), and finally published in 1887, by L. L. Zamenhof, as a primarily schematic language; the word-stems are borrowed from Romance, West Germanic and Slavic languages. The key to the relative success of Esperanto was probably the highly productive and elastic system of derivational word formation which allowed speakers to derive hundreds of other words by learning one word root. Moreover, Esperanto is quicker to learn than other languages, usually in a third up to a fifth of the time. From early on, Esperantists created their own culture which helped to form the Esperanto language community.

Within a few years this language had thousands of fluent speakers, primarily in eastern Europe. In 1905 its first world convention was held in Boulogne-sur-Mer. Since then world congresses have been held in different countries every year, except during the two World Wars. Esperanto has become "the most outlandishly successful invented language ever" and the most widely spoken constructed international auxiliary language. Esperanto is probably among the fifty languages which are most used internationally.

In 1922 a proposal by Iran and several other countries in the League of Nations to have Esperanto taught in member nations' schools failed. Esperanto speakers were subject to persecution under Stalin's regime. In Germany under Hitler, in Spain under Franco for about a decade, in Portugal under Salazar, in Romania under Ceaușescu, and in half a dozen Eastern European countries during the late forties and part of the fifties, Esperanto activities and the formation of Esperanto associations were forbidden. In spite of these factors more people continued to learn Esperanto, and significant literary work (both poetry and novels) appeared in Esperanto in the period between the World Wars and after them. Esperanto is spoken today in a growing number of countries and it has multiple generations of native speakers, although it is primarily used as a second language. Of the various constructed language projects, it is Esperanto that has so far come closest to becoming an officially recognized international auxiliary language; China publishes daily news in Esperanto.

==== Ido and the Esperantidos ====
The Delegation for the Adoption of an International Auxiliary Language was founded in 1900 by Louis Couturat and others; it tried to get the International Association of Academies to take up the question of an international auxiliary language, study the existing ones and pick one or design a new one. However, when the meta-academy declined to do so, the Delegation decided to do the job itself. Among Esperanto speakers there was a general impression that the Delegation would of course choose Esperanto, as it was the only auxlang with a sizable speaker community at the time; it was felt as a betrayal by many Esperanto speakers when in 1907 the Delegation came up with its own reformed version of Esperanto, Ido. Ido drew a significant number of speakers away from Esperanto in the short term, but in the longer term most of these either returned to Esperanto or moved on to other new auxlangs. Besides Ido, a great number of simplified Esperantos, called Esperantidos, emerged as concurrent language projects; still, Ido remains today one of the more widely spoken auxlangs.

==== Interlingue (Occidental) ====
Edgar de Wahl's Occidental of 1922 was in reaction against the perceived artificiality of some earlier auxlangs, particularly Esperanto. Inspired by Idiom Neutral and Latino sine flexione, de Wahl created a language whose words, including compound words, would have a high degree of recognizability for those who already know a Romance language. However, this design criterion was in conflict with the ease of coining new compound or derived words on the fly while speaking. Occidental was most active from the 1920s to the 1950s, and supported some 80 publications by the 1930s, but had almost entirely died out by the 1980s. Its name was officially changed to Interlingue in 1949. More recently Interlingue has been revived on the Internet.

==== Novial ====
In 1928 Ido's major intellectual supporter, the Danish linguist Otto Jespersen, abandoned Ido, and published his own planned language, Novial. It was mostly inspired by Idiom Neutral and Occidental, yet it attempted a derivational formalism and schematism sought by Esperanto and Ido. The notability of its creator helped the growth of this auxiliary language, but a reform of the language was proposed by Jespersen in 1934 and not long after this Europe entered World War II, and its creator died in 1943 before Europe was at peace again.

==== Interlingua ====
The International Auxiliary Language Association (IALA) was founded in 1924 by Alice Vanderbilt Morris; like the earlier Delegation for the Adoption of an International Auxiliary Language, its mission was to study language problems and the existing auxlangs and proposals for auxlangs, and to negotiate some consensus between the supporters of various auxlangs. However, like the Delegation, it finally decided to create its own auxlang. Interlingua, published in 1951, was primarily the work of Alexander Gode, though he built on preliminary work by earlier IALA linguists including André Martinet, and relied on elements from previous naturalistic auxlang projects, like Peano's Interlingua (Latino sine flexione), Jespersen's Novial, de Wahl's Interlingue, and the Academy's Idiom Neutral. Like Interlingue, Interlingua was designed to have words recognizable at sight by those who already know a Romance language or a language like English with much vocabulary borrowed from Romance languages; to attain this end the IALA accepted a degree of grammatical and orthographic complexity considerably greater than in Esperanto or Interlingue, though still less than in any natural language.

The theory underlying Interlingua posits an international vocabulary, a large number of words and affixes that are present in a wide range of languages. This already existing international vocabulary was shaped by social forces, science and technology, to "all corners of the world". The goal of the International Auxiliary Language Association was to accept into Interlingua every widely international word in whatever languages it occurred. They conducted studies to identify "the most generally international vocabulary possible", while still maintaining the unity of the language. This scientific approach of generating a language from selected source languages (called control languages) resulted in a vocabulary and grammar that can be called the highest common factor of each major European language.

Interlingua gained a significant speaker community, perhaps roughly the same size as that of Ido (considerably less than the size of Esperanto). Interlingua's success can be explained by the fact that it is the most widely understood international auxiliary language by virtue of its naturalistic (as opposed to schematic) grammar and vocabulary, allowing those familiar with a Romance language, and educated speakers of English, to read and understand it without prior study. Interlingua has some active speakers currently on all continents, and the language is propagated by the Union Mundial pro Interlingua (UMI), and Interlingua is presented on CDs, radio, and television.

After the creation of Interlingua, the enthusiasm for constructed languages gradually decreased in the years between 1960 and 1990.

=== Internet age ===
All of the auxlangs with a surviving speaker community seem to have benefited from the advent of the Internet, Esperanto more than most. The CONLANG mailing list was founded in 1991; in its early years discussion focused on international auxiliary languages. As people interested in artistic languages and engineered languages grew to be the majority of the list members, and flame-wars between proponents of particular auxlangs irritated these members, the separate AUXLANG mailing list was created in 1997, which has been the primary venue for discussion of auxlangs since then. Besides giving the existing auxlangs with speaker communities a chance to interact rapidly online as well as slowly through postal mail or more rarely in personal meetings, the Internet has also made it easier to publicize new auxlang projects, and a handful of these have gained a small speaker community, including Kotava (published in 1978), Lingua Franca Nova (1998), Slovio (1999), Interslavic (2006), Pandunia (2007), Sambahsa (2007), Lingwa de Planeta (2010), and Globasa (2019).

=== Zonal auxiliary languages ===
Not every international auxiliary language is necessarily intended to be used on a global scale. A special subgroup are languages created to facilitate communication between speakers of related languages. The oldest known example is a Pan-Slavic language written in 1665 by the Croatian priest Juraj Križanić. He named this language Ruski jezik ("Russian language"), although in reality it was a mixture of the Russian edition of Church Slavonic, his own Southern Chakavian dialect of Serbo-Croatian, and, to a lesser degree, Polish.

Most zonal auxiliary languages were created during the period of romantic nationalism at the end of the 19th century; some were created later. Particularly numerous are the Pan-Slavic language projects. However, similar efforts at creating umbrella languages have been made for other language families as well: Tutonish (1902), Folkspraak (1995) and other pan-Germanic languages for the Germanic languages; Romanid (1956) and several other pan-Romance languages for the Romance languages; and Afrihili (1973) for the African continent.

Notable among modern examples is Interslavic, a project first published in 2006 as Slovianski and then established in its current form in 2011 after the merger of several other projects. In 2012 it was reported to have several hundred users.

== Scholarly study ==
In the early 1900s auxlangs were already becoming a subject of academic study. Louis Couturat et al. described the controversy in the preface to their book International Language and Science:

The question of a so-called world-language, or better expressed, an international auxiliary language, was during the now past Volapük period, and is still in the present Esperanto movement, so much in the hands of Utopians, fanatics and enthusiasts, that it is difficult to form an unbiased opinion concerning it, although a good idea lies at its basis. (1910, p. v).

Leopold Pfaundler wrote that an IAL was needed for more effective communication among scientists:

All who are occupied with the reading or writing of scientific literature have assuredly very often felt the want of a common scientific language, and regretted the great loss of time and trouble caused by the multiplicity of languages employed in scientific literature.

For Couturat et al., Volapükists and Esperantists confounded the linguistic aspect of the question with many side issues, and they considered this a main reason why discussion about the idea of an international auxiliary language has appeared unpractical.

Some contemporaries of Couturat, notably Edward Sapir, saw the challenge of an auxiliary language not as much as that of identifying a descriptive linguistic answer (of grammar and vocabulary) to global communicative concerns, but rather as one of promoting the notion of a linguistic platform for lasting international understanding. Though interest among scholars, and linguists in particular, waned greatly throughout the 20th century, such differences of approach persist today. Some scholars and interested laymen make concrete language proposals. By contrast, Mario Pei and others place the broader societal issue first. Yet others argue in favor of a particular language while seeking to establish its social integration.

== Writing systems ==
Whilst most IALs use the Latin script, some of them also offer an alternative in the Cyrillic script.

=== Latin script ===
The vast majority of IALs use the Latin script. Several sounds, e.g. /n/, /m/, /t/, /f/ are written with the same letter as in IPA.

Some consonant sounds found in several Latin-script IAL alphabets are not represented by an ISO 646 letter in IPA. Three have a single letter in IPA, one has a widespread alternative taken from ISO 646:

- /ʃ/ (U+0283, IPA 134)
- /ʒ/ (U+0292, IPA 135)
- /ɡ/ (U+0261, IPA 110, single storey g) = g (U+0067, double storey g)

Four are affricates, each represented in IPA by two letters and a combining marker. They are often written decomposed:

- /t͡s/ = /ts/
- /t͡ʃ/ = /tʃ/ (Note: Polish distinguishes between these.)
- /d͡z/ = /dz/
- /d͡ʒ/ = /dʒ/

That means that two sounds that are one character in IPA and are not ISO 646, also have no common alternative in ISO 646: ʃ, ʒ.

ISO 639-3 code	Alphabet name	Non ISO 646 letters	Diacritics	Multigraphs	Sound, which in IPA is described by ISO 646 letter(s), is described by different letter(s)	Sound, which in IPA is described by non-ISO 646 letter(s), is described by different letter(s)
vol	Volapük	Yes (ꞛ, ꞝ, ꞟ)	Yes (ä, ö, ü)	No	Yes (x /ks/, z /ts~dz/)	Yes (c /tʃ~dʒ/, j /ʃ~ʒ/)
lfn	Lingua Franca Nova	No	No	No	Yes (c /k/)	Yes (j /ʒ/, x /ʃ/)
rmv	Romanova alphabet	No	No	No	Yes (c /k/)	Yes (j /ʃ/)
ina	Interlingua	No	No	Yes (ch /ʃ/ or /k/ or /tʃ/, qu /kw/ or /k/)	Yes (c /k/)	Yes (g /ʒ/, j /ʒ/)
ido	Ido	No	No	Yes (ch /tʃ/, qu /kw/, sh /ʃ/)	Yes (c /ts/, q /k/, x /ks/ or /ɡz/)	Yes (j /ʒ/, sh /ʃ/)
nov	Novial	No	No	Yes (ch /tʃ/, sh /ʃ/, y /j/)	Yes (q /k/, x /ks/)	Yes (j /ʒ/, sh /ʃ/)
igs	Interglossa	No	No	Yes (ph /f/, th /t/, ch /k/, rh /r/)	Yes (c /k/, q /k/, x /ks/, z /ts/)	No
avk	Kotava	No	No	No	Yes (y /j/)	Yes (c /ʃ/, j /ʒ/)
epo	Esperanto	No	Yes (ĉ, ĝ, ĥ, ĵ, ŝ, ŭ)	No	Yes (c /ts/)	No
–	Mundolinco	No	No	No	Yes (c /k/)	No
–	Glosa	No	No	Yes (sc /ʃ/)	Yes (q /kw/, x /ks/)	Yes (c /tʃ/, sc /ʃ/)
–	Sambahsa	No	No	Yes (ch /tʃ/, sch /ʃ/, and more)	Yes (y, as a semi-vowel /j/, x /ks, gz/, and more)	Yes (j /ʒ/, ch /tʃ/, sh /ʃ/, sh /ç/, and more)
–	Idiom Neutral	No	No	Yes (sh /ʃ/)	Yes (y /j/)	Yes (c /tʃ/, j /ʒ/, sh /ʃ/)
–	Lingwa de Planeta	No	No	Yes (ch /tʃ/, sh /ʃ/)	Yes (x /gz/, z /dz/)	Yes (c in ch /tʃ/, j /dʒ/)
ile	Interlingue	No	No	Yes		
	Latino sine flexione	No	No	Yes		
isv	Interslavic	No	Yes (č, ě, š, ž)	dž, but similar to or same as d+ž	Yes (c /ts/, y /i ~ ɪ/)	Yes (č /tʃ/, š /ʃ/, ž /ʒ/)
–	Uropi	Yes (ʒ /ʒ/)	No	No	No	Yes (c /ʃ/)

== Classification ==
The following classification of auxiliary languages was developed by Pierre Janton in 1993:

- A priori languages are characterized by largely artificial morphemes (not borrowed from natural languages), schematic derivation, simple phonology, grammar, and morphology. Some a priori languages are called philosophical languages, referring to their basis in philosophical ideas about thought and language. These include some of the earliest efforts at auxiliary language in the 17th century. Some more specific subcategories:
  - Taxonomic languages form their words using a taxonomic hierarchy, with each phoneme of a word helping specify its position in a semantic hierarchy of some kind; for example, Solresol.
  - Pasigraphies are purely written languages without a spoken form, or with a spoken form left at the discretion of the reader; many of the 17th–18th century philosophical languages and auxlangs were pasigraphies. This set historically tends to overlap with taxonomic languages, though there is no inherent reason a pasigraphy needs to be taxonomic.
- A posteriori languages are based on existing natural languages. Nearly all the auxiliary languages with fluent speakers are in this category. Most of the a posteriori auxiliary languages borrow their vocabulary primarily or solely from European languages, and base their grammar more or less on European models. (Sometimes these European-based languages are referred to as "euroclones", although this term has negative connotations and is not used in the academic literature.) Interlingua was drawn originally from international scientific vocabulary, in turn based primarily on Greek and Latin roots. Glosa did likewise, with a stronger dependence of Greek roots. Although a posteriori languages have been based on most of the families of European languages, the most successful of these (notably Esperanto, Ido, and Interlingua) have been based largely on Romance elements.
  - Schematic (or "mixed") languages have some a priori qualities. Some have ethnic morphemes but alter them significantly to fit a simplified phonotactic pattern (e.g., Volapük) or both artificial and natural morphemes (e.g., Perio). Partly schematic languages have partly schematic and partly naturalistic derivation (e.g. Esperanto and Ido). Natural morphemes of languages in this group are rarely altered greatly from their source-language form, but compound and derived words are generally not recognizable at sight by people familiar with the source languages.
  - Naturalistic languages resemble existing natural languages. For example, Interlingue, Interlingua, and Lingua Franca Nova were developed so that not only the root words but their compounds and derivations will often be immediately recognized by large numbers of people. Some naturalistic languages do have a limited number of artificial morphemes or invented grammatical devices (e.g. Novial). (Note: The term "naturalistic" as used in auxiliary languages does not mean the same thing as the homophonous term used for describing artistic languages.)
  - Simplified, or controlled versions of natural languages reduce the full extent of the vocabulary and partially regularize the grammar of a natural language (e.g. Basic English and Special English).

=== Comparison of sample texts ===
Some examples of the best known international auxiliary languages are shown below for comparative purposes, using the Lord's Prayer (a core Christian prayer, the translated text of which is regularly used for linguistic comparisons).

As a reference for comparison, one can find the Latin, English, French, and Spanish versions here:

==== Natural languages ====
Latin version	English version (KJV)	French version	Spanish version
Pater noster, qui es in cælis, sanctificetur nomen tuum. Adveniat regnum tuum. Fiat voluntas tua, sicut in cælo, et in terra. Panem nostrum quotidianum da nobis hodie, et dimitte nobis debita nostra, sicut et nos dimittimus debitoribus nostris. Et ne nos inducas in tentationem, sed libera nos a malo. Amen.	Our Father, who art in heaven, hallowed be thy name; thy kingdom come, thy will be done. on earth, as it is in heaven. Give us this day our daily bread; and forgive us our debts as we have forgiven our debtors. And lead us not into temptation, but deliver us from evil. Amen.	Notre Père, qui es aux cieux, que ton nom soit sanctifié, que ton règne vienne, que ta volonté soit faite sur la terre comme au ciel. Donne-nous aujourd’hui notre pain de ce jour. Pardonne-nous nos offenses, comme nous pardonnons aussi à ceux qui nous ont offensés. Et ne nous laisse pas entrer en tentation mais délivre-nous du Mal. Amen.	Padre nuestro, que estás en los cielos, santificado sea tu nombre; venga a nosotros tu reino; hágase tu voluntad así en la Tierra como en el cielo. El pan nuestro de cada día dánosle hoy; y perdónanos nuestras deudas así como nosotros perdonamos a nuestros deudores; no nos dejes caer en la tentación, mas líbranos del mal. Amén.

==== Schematic languages ====
Esperanto version	Ido version	Idiom Neutral version	Novial version
Patro Nia, kiu estas en la ĉielo, via nomo estu sanktigita. Venu via regno, plenumiĝu via volo, kiel en la ĉielo, tiel ankaŭ sur la tero. Nian panon ĉiutagan donu al ni hodiaŭ. Kaj pardonu al ni niajn ŝuldojn, kiel ankaŭ ni pardonas al niaj ŝuldantoj. Kaj ne konduku nin en tenton, sed liberigu nin de la malbono. Amen.	Patro nia, qua esas en la cielo, tua nomo santigesez; tua regno advenez; tua volo facesez quale en la cielo, tale anke sur la tero. Donez a ni cadie l'omnadiala pano, e pardonez a ni nia ofensi, quale anke ni pardonas a nia ofensanti, e ne duktez ni aden la tento, ma liberigez ni del malajo. Amen.	Nostr patr kel es in sieli! Ke votr nom es sanktifiked; ke votr regnia veni; ke votr volu es fasied, kuale in siel, tale et su ter. Dona sidiurne a noi nostr pan omnidiurnik; e pardona a noi nostr debti, kuale et noi pardon a nostr debtatori; e no induka noi in tentasion, ma librifika noi da it mal. Amen.	Nusen Patre, kel es in siele, mey vun nome bli sanktifika, mey vun regno veni; mey on fa vun volio kom in siele anke sur tere. Dona a nus dissidi li omnidiali pane, e pardona a nus nusen ofensos, kom anke nus pardona a nusen ofensantes, e non dukte nus en tentatione, ma liberisa nus fro malu. Amen.

==== Naturalistic languages ====
Latino sine flexione version	Interlingue version	Interlingua version	Lingua Franca Nova version
Patre nostro, qui es in caelos, que tuo nomine fi sanctificato; que tuo regno adveni; que tuo voluntate es facto sicut in celo et in terra. Da hodie ad nos nostro pane quotidiano, et remitte ad nos nostro debitos, sicut et nos remitte ad nostro debitores. Et non induce nos in tentatione, sed libera nos ab malo. Amen.	Patre nor, qui es in li cieles, mey tui nómine esser sanctificat, mey tui regnia venir, mey tui vole esser fat, qualmen in li cieles talmen anc sur li terre. Da nos hodie nor pan omnidial, e pardona nor débites, qualmen anc noi pardona nor debitores. E ne inducte nos in tentation, ma libera nos de lu mal. Amen.	Patre nostre, qui es in le celos, que tu nomine sia sanctificate; que tu regno veni; que tu voluntate sia facite como in le celo, etiam super le terra. Da nos hodie nostre pan quotidian, e pardona a nos nostre debitas como etiam nos los pardona a nostre debitores. E non induce nos in tentation, sed libera nos del mal. Amen.	Nosa Padre, ci es en la sielo, ta ce tua nom es santida; ta ce tua rena veni; ta ce tua vole es fada, sur tera como en sielo. Dona nosa pan dial a nos, e pardona nosa detas como nos pardona nosa detores. E no indui nos en tenta, ma libri nos de mal. Amen.

==== Other examples ====
Volapük version	Glosa version	Kotava version	Toki Pona version
O Fat obas, kel binol in süls, paisaludomöz nem ola! Kömomöd monargän ola! Jenomöz vil olik, äs in sül, i su tal! Bodi obsik vädeliki givolös obes adelo! E pardolös obes debis obsik, äs id obs aipardobs debeles obas. E no obis nindukolös in tentadi; sod aidalivolös obis de bad. Jenosöd!	Na patri in urani: na volu; tu nomina gene honora, tu krati veni e tu tende gene akti epi geo homo in urani. Place don a na nu-di na di-pani e tu pardo na plu Mali akti; metri na pardo mu; qi akti Mali a na. E ne direkti na a u proba; sed libe na ab Mali. Amen.	Minaf Gadik dan koe kelt til, Rinaf yolt zo tutumtar, Rinafa gazara pir, Rinafa baltanira zo askir moe tawava dum koe kelt. Va vielaf beg pu min batvielon zilil! Va minafa kantara se ixel dum pu tel va min al ixes dere ixet! Ise van zoenilu va min me levplekul, Volse sol rote va min tunuyal! Amen	mama pi mi mute o, sina lon sewi kon. nimi sina li sewi. ma sina o kama. jan o pali e wile sina lon sewi kon en lon ma. o pana e moku pi tenpo suno ni tawa mi mute. o weka e pali ike mi. sama la mi weka e pali ike pi jan ante. o lawa ala e mi tawa ike. o lawa e mi tan ike. Amen.

== Methods of propagation ==
As has been pointed out, the issue of an international language is not so much which, but how. Several approaches exist toward the eventual full expansion and consolidation of an international auxiliary language.

1. Laissez-faire. This approach is taken in the belief that one language will eventually and inevitably "win out" as a world auxiliary language (e.g. International English) without any need for specific action.
2. Institutional sponsorship and grass-roots promotion of language programs. This approach has taken various forms, depending on the language and language type, ranging from government promotion of a particular language to one-on-one encouragement to learn the language to instructional or marketing programs.
3. National legislation. This approach seeks to have individual countries (or even localities) progressively endorse a given language as an official language (or to promote the concept of international legislation).
4. International legislation. This approach involves promotion of the future holding of a binding international convention (perhaps to be under the auspices of such international organizations as the United Nations or Inter-Parliamentary Union) to formally agree upon an official international auxiliary language which would then be taught in all schools around the world, beginning at the primary level. This approach, an official principle of the Baháʼí Faith, seeks to put a combination of international opinion, linguistic expertise, and law behind a to-be-selected language and thus expand or consolidate it as a full official world language, to be used in addition to local languages. This approach could either give more credibility to a natural language already serving this purpose to a certain degree (e.g. if English were chosen) or to give a greatly enhanced chance for a constructed language to take root. For constructed languages particularly, this approach has been seen by various individuals in the IAL movement as holding the most promise of ensuring that promotion of studies in the language would not be met with skepticism at its practicality by its would-be learners.

== Pictorial languages ==
There have been a number of proposals for using pictures, ideograms, diagrams, and other pictorial representations for international communications. Examples range from the original Characteristica Universalis proposed by the philosopher Leibniz in the 17th century, to recent inventions such as Blissymbol, first published in 1949.

Within the scientific community, there is already considerable agreement in the form of the schematics used to represent electronic circuits, chemical symbols, mathematical symbols, and the Energy Systems Language of systems ecology. Internationally regularized symbols are further used to regulate traffic, to indicate resources for tourists, and in maps. Some symbols have become nearly universal through their consistent use in computers and on the Internet.

== Sign languages ==
An international auxiliary sign language has been developed by deaf people who meet regularly at international forums such as sporting events or in political organisations. Previously referred to as Gestuno but now more commonly known simply as 'international sign', the language has continued to develop since the first signs were standardised in 1973, and it is now in widespread use. International sign is distinct in many ways from spoken IALs; many signs are iconic, and signers tend to insert these signs into the grammar of their own sign language, with an emphasis on visually intuitive gestures and mime. A simple sign language called Plains Indian Sign Language was used by indigenous peoples of the Americas.

Gestuno is not to be confused with the separate and unrelated sign language Signuno, which is essentially a Signed Exact Esperanto. Signuno is not in any significant use, and is based on the Esperanto community rather than based on the international Deaf community.

== Criticism ==
There has been considerable criticism of individual proposed IALs, of types of proposals, and of the concept of international auxiliary languages in general.

Much criticism has been focused either on the artificiality of international auxiliary languages, or on the argumentativeness of proponents and their failure to agree on one language, or even on objective criteria by which to judge them. However, probably the most common criticism is that a constructed auxlang is unnecessary because natural languages such as English are already in wide use as auxlangs.

One criticism already prevalent in the late 19th century, and still sometimes heard today, is that an international language might hasten the extinction of minority languages.

Although referred to as international languages, most of these languages have historically been constructed on the basis of Western European languages. Esperanto and other languages such as Interlingua and Ido have been criticized for being too European and not global enough. The term "Euroclone" was coined to refer to such languages in contrast to "worldlangs" with global vocabulary sources.

== See also ==
See List of constructed languages § Auxiliary languages for a list of designed international auxiliary languages.

- Interlinguistics
- International Language Review
- Language education
- Language planning
- Lingua franca
- Living Latin
- Pidgin
- Baháʼí Faith and auxiliary language
- Zonal constructed languages
- Global language system
- Universal language
