= Linguistics in science fiction =

How science fiction has used the science of language as a subject

Linguistics has an intrinsic connection to science fiction stories given the nature of the genre and its frequent use of alien settings and cultures. As mentioned in Aliens and Linguists: Language Study and Science Fiction by Walter E. Meyers, science fiction is almost always concerned with the idea of communication, such as communication with aliens and machines, or communication using dead languages and evolved languages of the future. Authors at times use linguistics and its theories as a tool for storytelling, as in Jack Vance's 1958 novel Languages of Pao, although technical terms are rarely used, and authors only go into as much detail as the average reader will understand.

While linguistics is used by science fiction authors, not all uses are accurate to actual linguistics and its theories. Nevertheless, there still exists the lingering presence and use of linguistics (even if inaccurate) in such cases. As mentioned by Walter E. Meyers, the ability to make a story seem more unfamiliar and exotic, and an alien seem less of a costumed human who merely differs in physical appearance, is only possible through the use of language. It is this ability that appears to draw the boundary between great works of science fiction and those lesser so. As such, linguistics, the scientific study of language, comes to hold an important role in the genre of science fiction.

== History ==
=== The Lord of the Rings and linguistics ===
Since the mid-19th century, science fiction works using language as the heart of the plot, rather than just a convenient means to advance the story, have reflected the history of linguistics. One such case of the history of linguistics being intertwined with the makings of science fiction involves the author J. R. R. Tolkien, who is known for fantasy works such as The Lord of the Rings.

This history begins with the Oxford English Dictionary (OED), which was 70 years in the making and aimed at "...exhibiting the history and significance of English words now in use, or known to have been in use since the middle of the 12th century". William Craigie, one of the editors of the OED, tutored undergraduates at Oxford including Tolkien, whom he later invited to work as a junior editor of the OED. According to Daniel Grotta-Kurska, Tolkien’s biographer, it was Craigie who provided "Tolkien’s greatest impetus to transform Elvish from an experiment to a life-long pursuit".

As Tolkien built the Elvish language, his fantasy works were aimed at providing a setting for it. The Silmarillion, which covered the First and Second Age (a period of time before The Lord of the Rings), was said by Tolkien as having been:

"...primarily linguistic in inspiration and was begun in order to provide the necessary background of ‘history’ for Elvish tongues."

As Walter E. Meyers pointed out,

"...Tolkien would shape his narrative to fit not just one language at a particular time, but a whole world of languages in earlier and later stages, some related and some not, all molded by principles of historic change."

True to this, Paul Kocher noticed that the evolution of the languages of Middle-Earth was similar to that of the Indo-European languages.

As Meyers noted, the rich linguistic details encapsulated within The Lord of the Rings made reading it feel:

"... more like reading history, during which we know that the author has not exhausted the subject in the discussion of it."

Meyers attributes most of this feeling to the languages of The Lord of the Rings, explaining,

"We know the existence of a realm of perception beyond our experience when we travel to a country whose language we do not speak. All around us we hear unknown yet articulate sounds, and we know that a culture lies behind them, a culture to which we can be admitted with patience and study. It is much the same with LR; yet there we do not travel not in a foreign country, but in a foreign world, for the languages we encounter are many."

In The Lord of the Rings, all the different beings (dwarves, elves, humans and orcs) spoke different languages and dialects, with only the hobbits speaking English. The riders of Rohan (Middle-earth) spoke Rohirric, illustrated by Tolkien using slightly disguised Old English (especially since the language was archaic compared to that of the hobbits). The orcs even had a language with different dialects while the language of the elves had history narrated into it.

The efforts employed by Tolkien to fully create the languages of The Lord of the Rings and the importance he gives them are obvious from his attention to linguistic detail. This attention to linguistic detail was so great, Meyers in his work Aliens and Linguists: Language Study and Science Fiction was able to conduct a linguistic analysis on Tolkien’s Elvish languages (Middle-earth). Although the full analysis will not be provided, the following content are some conclusions he derived from the analysis.

With regards to Elvish, there are two forms: Quenya and Sindarin. These two forms are somehow related, with both being derived from an older form of language, although Quenya was more similar to that older form and retained certain features of it. The word order of Quenya poetry is flexible, as the suffixes on the words showed their relationships, similar to many inflected languages in the real world, such as Latin. Quenya appeared to be like Indo-European languages in its structure, where, for example, a verb consists of a prefix (if any), a root and an ending that show grammatical tense, grammatical aspect and number.

As Meyers concludes from this analysis,

"Tolkien’s great trilogy, together with The Hobbit and The Silmarillion, is a full embodiment of historical linguistics’ highest aims."

With Tolkien’s efforts in his works, science fiction authors have honoured him by referencing his creations in their own works. One example of such a case is Hal Clement’s Mission of Gravity, in which the protagonist, Barlennan, sails a ship named ‘’Bree’’, referencing Tolkien’s Barliman Butterbur, the owner of the inn ‘The Prancing Pony’ The Prancing Pony in the town of Bree (Middle-earth). In James Tiptree Jr.’s Your Haploid Heart, Mordor, a fictional realm in Tolkien’s works, was used as a common obscenity, similar to how we use ‘Hell’. A. Bertram Chandler’s To Keep the Ship even mentioned a constellation named ‘The Hobbit’.

Several books also went into depth about the languages in The Lord of the Rings trilogy. One example of this is the Parma Eldalamberon (see: Elvish Linguistic Fellowship), a special interest group of the Mythopoeic Society. Another example is A Glossary of the Eldarin Tongues written by James D. Allan in 1972, before it was replaced by An Introduction to Elvish, which discussed the languages in Middle-earth, in 1978.

=== Whorf and science fiction ===
Franz Boas was a self-taught linguist who focused on the aboriginal languages of North America. His field experience led to the realisation that using the traditional method of analyzing Western European languages would not work for other languages. Boas wrote the Handbook of American Indian Languages in 1911, justifying his methods in the book by saying:

"It is important at this point to emphasize the fact that the group of ideas expressed by specific phonetic groups show material differences in different languages, and do not conform by any means to the same principles of classification."

Edward Sapir met Boas in 1904, and was inspired to begin analysing American Indian languages. Sapir then became Benjamin Lee Whorf’s mentor. Some parts of Whorf’s later ideas can be found in Sapir’s works, such as in linguistic relativity, which is sometimes referred to as the Sapir-Whorf hypothesis.

In 1924, Whorf wrote a science fiction novel called The Ruler of the Universe, which remained unpublished. It narrated the destruction of Earth by a horrific chain reaction caused by the military's research on atomic fission. According to Peter C. Rollins, it was during the writing of this work that Whorf began to consider the relation between Language and Thought, resulting in the principle of linguistic relativity.

As summarised by Meyers,

"The central question of linguistic relativity is this: does our perception of reality constrain our language or does our language constrain our perception of reality?"

This came to suggest that language influenced the naming of places (similar to gender assignments seen in Spanish nouns), an example of language constraining our perception of reality.

In ‘’Science and Linguistics’’, Whorf stated that:

"All observers are not led by the same physical evidence to the same picture of the universe, unless their linguistic backgrounds are similar, or can in some way be calibrated."

Whorf’s principle of linguistic relativity was very much used as material for science fiction novels. For example, it appeared in Philip José Farmer’s Prometheus, in which the protagonist, at one point, suggested teaching different groups of aliens different languages, to test the Whorf hypothesis.

As pointed out by Meyers,

"The Whorf hypothesis has a corollary: if it is true that our language determines our perception of reality, then whoever controls language controls the perceptions of reality as well. If language can be controlled. Then would-be despots have available a subtle and efficient means of restricting thought."

This is explored in George Orwell’s work, Nineteen Eighty-four. The novel tells the story of a government that practises totalitarianism, where even thoughts could be considered an offence (see: Thoughtcrime). Newspeak was created by the government, which was a much narrower form of English, to limit freedom of thought. The list of vocabulary grew smaller each year, and the meanings of the words were reduced as well, all to fit into the political goals of the ruling party.

"Don’t you see that the whole aim of Newspeak is to narrow the range of thought? In the end we shall make thoughtcrime literally impossible, because there will be no words in which to express it. … Every year fewer and fewer words, and the range of consciousness always a little smaller. … The Revolution will be complete when the language is perfect."

However, the Whorf hypothesis could also work to the advantage of human beings. This was seen in Jack Vance’s The Languages of Pao, in which the planet Pao was invaded by another planet and the son of the Emperor of Pao was placed on the throne as the invaders’ puppet. The son, Beran Panasper, sought the help of a scientist, Palafox, from another planet, Breakness, to free Pao. As one of Palafox’s sons said:

"Think of a language as the contour of a watershed, stopping flow in certain directions, channeling it into others. Language controls the mechanism of your mind. When people speak different languages, their minds work differently and they act differently."

Linguistic Relativity continues to play a large role in the story, where language constrains world-views of the speaker and can be used as a tool to control or liberate the people.

=== After WWII ===
Science fiction works after WWII were influenced by the beliefs behind Alfred Korzybski’s General Semantics. When Korzybski launched General Semantics as a self-improvement program, John W. Campbell Jr. promoted its belief system to many widely read science fiction authors and encouraged people to write about it in works of science fiction. This is in spite of the fact that General Semantics has nothing to do with linguistics. As such, science fiction works of this era often contradict actual psycholinguistic theories. For example, in The World of Null-A by A. E. van Vogt describes language as having the ability to physically alter the human brain in the sense that if a language portrays reality untruthfully, "brain damage (in the form of sub-microscopic colloidal lesions) results". This contradicts any and all psycholinguistic descriptions of aphasia, the only language related brain damage. Even in aphasia, language is not the cause, although the loss of language is an effect.

General semantics has also inspired Babel-17 by Samuel R. Delany. In this story, Delany described a character as being incapable of pronouncing /b/ but capable of pronouncing /p/ due to the presence of fangs. This is not a speech impediment that can be caused by having fangs because the two phonemes share the same method of articulation, they are both bilabial stops. The only thing that is distinct between the two is voicedness; /b/ is voiced while /p/ is unvoiced. Therefore, the only thing that can cause such a speech impediment is damage to the vocal cords. Even if there is damage to the vocal cords it only makes sense if the resulting speech impediment was an inability to produce a voiced sound due to the inability for the damaged vocal cords to vibrate properly. Babel-17, despite its linguistic errors, was positively received by its readers. In the same book, Delany confuses between grammatical gender and sex. He has a character lament over how a "sex" can be assigned in some languages but not others. This is incongruent with grammatical gender because it is not about sex and it is not a matter of choice whether or not a speaker uses grammatical gender in a language with grammatical gender.

Because general semantics has language as a core concern, it was not uncommon for science fiction authors of its time to adopt it as a basis for the different ways they might imagine language to affect the human mind. This can be seen in Gulf by Robert A. Heinlein where Speedtalk is described to "[make] thought processes enormously faster". In Gulf, Heinlein described Speedtalk as being able to express whole sentences in a word. Together, these features were supposed to make the characters of his book more efficient by means of language. Here, science fiction contradicts linguistics for it has been proven that the speed of thought is independent of the length of a verbal utterance. Heinlein also made Speedtalk to have no real distinction between nouns and verbs because he believed that they were not necessary to be logical. In short, Speedtalk is yet another product of subscription to the Sapir-Whorf hypothesis; Heinlein believed that providing his characters with a language he claimed was logical would make them incapable of illogical thought.

In The Languages of Pao, Jack Vance managed to avoid the mistakes that a lot of other science fiction authors have made. At the same time, Vance employs the Sapir-Whorf hypothesis in his work; he describes the languages of the Paonese people as being capable of altering their minds.

The Embedding by Ian Watson, however, contains detailed descriptions of many linguistics concepts and theories, with the language experiments Watson wrote about in his book also receiving praise from Meyers. One criticism Meyers had for it was that it was wrong of Watson to think of American English as "a totally nonexistent dialect"

Many works are often well received despite their erroneous portrayal linguistics. As a result, readers of these works of science fiction are likely to be misinformed of linguistic facts. Despite this, linguistic concepts and theories are used as a tool in science fiction to "[give readers] important insights into man and his world". Even in works that try to be as linguistically accurate as possible, there is still a chance of the author making the Sapir-Whorf hypothesis its central argument in the language of their fictional world.

== Alien communication ==
When dealing with fictional alien languages, the general practice for science fiction, as described by Meyers, was to "mine earlier stories for themes and approaches, frequently making references to what they regard as flaws or virtues in the works of their predecessors". As such, it is common for science fiction works to be inspired by one another in terms of linguistics endeavours.

To have alien language involved in works of science fiction, there has to be contact between humans and extraterrestrial life forms. This is argued by Meyers to be a "staple" of science fiction. Despite the linguistic nature of such a task, Meyers laments that "the job of a linguist is handled by some other specialist" and in the works he examined, the characters seem to have no qualms with such a choice. There are several works of science fiction that have professionals with no linguistic training to undertake the attempts at communication with aliens. Such examples include professionals like astronomers, geologists and poets. To some of these choices, Meyers suggests that the success of science fiction communications "might be the result of sheer good luck" for characters are often unfamiliar not only with the alien language they are faced, but linguistics as a whole.

In science fiction, the success in communication with extraterrestrial life forms often involve no attempt at solving the issue of the language barrier between the human characters and the alien characters. Meyers expresses his distaste for such writing in Aliens and Linguists: Language Study and Science Fiction with:

"One does not resolve a contradiction by asserting it"

Generally, science fiction authors still use such a non-method. One such example is the translation circuit built into the TARDIS (see: Automatic Translators) that automatically resolves any language barrier characters face in their space travel.

At the same time, science fiction is not completely devoid of attempts at solving the issue of language barriers between the different species of science fiction.

In Tetrahedra of Space, author P. Schuyler Miller employs sign language as a means of communication between aliens and humans. This is, however, not before having considered other methods such as drawings. A notable attempt from the novel is that the human in the story draws a diagram of the Solar System to explain to the alien its heliocentric nature. This method is susceptible to the arbitrariness of images. This is similar to the criticisms often applied to the Pioneer plaque that Frank Drake and Carl Sagan placed on board the Pioneer 10 spacecraft. The diagram in the story, much like the diagrams on the Pioneer plaque, can be easily misunderstood by any nonhuman life form that comes across it. In short, the strategy of using images to communicate with aliens in science fiction is not linguistically robust.

Another point of discussion brought up by Meyers is the question of whether or not aliens even have the sense of sight. The strategy of using images to communicate with aliens would not even be possible, regardless of its arbitrariness, if the intended recipient is not even capable of seeing it. For example, in Old Faithful by Raymond Z. Gallun, a Martian astronomer detects a morse code message from Earth. Unfortunately for the Martian, not only can he not understand the message, he is deaf and mute and is therefore familiar with neither the concept that sounds are put together to represent meanings in human language, nor that these strings of sound are represented by an orthography that can be encoded into signals. Throughout the book, Gallun made the Martian learn the messages he receives from Earth despite his disability.

In Swords of Mars of the Barsoom series, an example praised by Meyers, author Edgar Rice Burroughs documented a method with which his alien character learns human language that is similar to that used by linguists. In one of the books, the alien character ignores the attempts of communication made by a human character for being too ambiguous. Instead, he points to things in his surroundings and asks the human for a name. This way, he slowly learns some words in English.

In The Winds of Time by Chad Oliver, Oliver not only addressed the issue of there being language barrier but also described a method similar to those a linguist might employ when trying to document an unfamiliar language. The alien even goes on to look for minimal pairs and with his findings, builds an alien equivalent of the International Phonetic Alphabet (IPA). The alien also learns human languages other than English, the majority language of where his ship landed. Oliver, however, glossed over the morphology (linguistics) and syntax part of learning a language and chose to summarise the entire process instead. Overall, Meyers praised this book as having "[set] a high standard of excellence for the use of linguistics".

The minority of its kind, Story of Your Life by Ted Chiang actually has a linguist attempt communication with an alien species that entered the Earth’s atmosphere. The linguistic concept used in the novella was the Sapir-Whorf hypothesis. The novella is the source material for the 2016 film, Arrival (film).

== Deciphering languages ==
The concept of unknown languages appears as a recurring theme in many science fiction books that contain alien languages. In some science fiction works, the deciphering of these unknown languages by protagonists of the story follow the linguistic method similar to that used in the decipherment of ancient Egyptian scripts using the Rosetta Stone. This method involves comparing between translations of the same text, where at least one translation is in a known text. As Meyers puts it,

"...to decipher a dead language one must have some way of getting into the circle, of finding a connection between something inside the system and something outside it."

This method can be seen in science fiction works such as Arrival (film) in which a part of the deciphering process involved acquiring translations of English sentences in the alien language to compare and decipher meanings. Another method used in the movie was learning the language one word at a time, see: Alien Communication. This is not a recent phenomenon in science fiction, with such ideas appearing even earlier such as in This Perfect Day by Ira Levin. In the story, the world is unified under an oppressive rule with only one language. The protagonist, a nonconformist, later finds books in other languages and attempts to decipher them with limited success, until he finds a book (in French) with an essay by the founder of the unified world; an essay which already has a translated version available to him in the language he knows. This, in the same way as the Rosetta Stone, helps him decipher the language (French). Some other works involve lesser accidental Rosetta Stones but rather deliberate clues with the explicit intention of helping future populations decipher the language. In such cases, since there is no way of knowing what future communication is like, there is a preference to use illustrations and other instructional material to help future populations learn the unknown language. Such methods can be found in works such as The Retreat to Mars by Cecil B. White.

Other works of science fiction involving language decipherment are Expedition by Anthony Boucher, Resurrection/The Monster (short story) by A. E. van Vogt, Surface Tension (short story) by James Blish, The Star by Arthur C. Clarke, and Omnilingual by H. Beam Piper.

Works that contain more futile efforts of the decipherment of unknown languages include The Pastel City (Viriconium Book 1), No Jokes on Mars by James Blish, and Patron of the Arts by William Rotsler.

== Language change ==
=== Historical change ===
"Science fiction as a genre, then, has a special relationship within the field of language within the field of language studies to historical linguistics."

As mentioned by Walter E. Meyers, science fiction is the only genre that enables writers to either foresee the future of the language or the older forms of language, depending on the context of the story. Despite this, many authors failed to realise the importance of linguistics in science fiction, even those with good knowledge of the field. As noted by John Krueger:

"...in perhaps one-third or thereabouts of s-f stories, problems of language and communication raise their head, though not always playing a major role."

One example of this can be viewed in the portrayal of historical linguistics. Historical linguistics entails the study of the older forms of language, and unfortunately, has been one of the lowest priorities in accuracy for science-fiction authors. In some instances linguistic facts were disregarded such as in Harvey Jacobs’s The Egg of the Glak, where the Great Vowel Shift was said to be caused by the Norman Conquest. In other instances, linguistic changes were misinterpreted such as in Larry Niven’s The Fourth Profession.

However, there are authors who have employed linguistic change in their works fairly well. Philip José Farmer, for instance, conducted extensive research on the forms of English in different historical periods for his series Riverworld, resulting in consistent accuracies with language change in English. As Meyers points out,

"In general the treatment of linguistic change in science fiction is like the sky on a hazy night: a few bright spots seen through an obfuscating fog."

=== Evolutionary change ===
Science fiction authors have had differing views on how language will change in the future. Some believe English will become incomprehensible such as in H. G. Wells’s The Time Machine. Others hypothesize English will be influenced by other languages, as seen in the Nadsat jargon of A Clockwork Orange by Anthony Burgess. There are, however, science fiction authors who choose neither and proclaim English as the "interstellar lingua franca as it had on Earth" such as in Robert Silverberg’s Schwartz Between the Galaxies and in Arthur C. Clarke’s Childhood's End, in which English is spoken by everyone. In his Visions of Tomorrow, David Samuelson noted that many science-fiction authors prefer English as the universal spoken language in their stories. For written English on the other hand, many science-fiction authors perceive a bleak future. This is seen in works such as Walter Miller, Jr.’s A Canticle for Leibowitz, in which the people are reduced to illiteracy due to nuclear war. In Algis Budrys’s For Love, it is not nuclear war but rather alien invasion that causes this. In other works such as Samuel R. Delaney’s Time Considered as a Helix of Semi-Precious Stones and Robert Sheckley’s Mindswap, written English is not completely wiped out but instead reduced to basic English.

"most science fiction writers have …. the habit of being extremely slipshod about language… The time travelers hop three thousand years into the future and find people still speaking idiomatic New York English. (How many people today speak any language that was used in 1000 B.C.?)"

As from the quote by Fletcher Pratt, the future of the language appears to be a topic brushed over by some science-fiction writers, where time-travellers into the future still find themselves being able to communicate perfectly in the same English regardless of the year from which the characters originate. Glottochronology assumes that a certain amount of basic words in a language will be lost after a thousand years and subsequently. This would mean that the language as we know it now would not be fully similar in the far future. Although, certain writers believed sound recordings would hinder language change, as seen in Arthur C. Clarke’s The City and the Stars.

However, not all writers give a lackluster effort into the future of the language. Science-fiction writers mostly use two methods to demonstrate English of the future: some difference in pronunciation, and the insertion of a few words. The former can be seen in Bruce McAllister’s Benji’s Pencil, where English is described as sounding like "nasalised English, chopped but softer than German" 200 years into the future. The inclusion of new words consists of either forming new words, such as "goffin" in James Blish’s A Work of Art, or using old words in a new sense such as in Samuel R. Delaney’s The Star Pit, in which the word "golden" is used as a term referring to the only ones capable of withstanding the mental stress of piloting an intergalactic craft.

Such assumptions on the evolution of language in science fiction might be helpful in predicting the future of language in reality as seen in an undertaking by Peter Stockwell.

All in all, the state of language change in science fiction may be summarized well by the following excerpt from Aliens and Linguists: Language Study and Science Fiction by Walter E. Meyers:

"...science fiction is a window not into the future but into the present: in its stories we see what the writers know about language in general and historical linguistics in particular."

== Learning alien language ==
Although works of science fiction throughout history have employed different methods of learning alien language, their methods of language learning are not the standard. According to Walter E. Meyers in Aliens and Linguists: Language Study and Science Fiction, short stories were common in science fiction works of the time. This meant that for the sake of storytelling, authors usually had no room for extended descriptions on the process of language learning. When that process is described, it is usually not a central concern; some authors might try to document the process but most others would ignore it altogether. As Beverly Friend pointed out, having aliens learn human language rather than the opposite was a popular strategy. When human characters do learn alien languages, it is commonly done through the strategies listed below:

Method of learning	Description	Appears in works
Hypnosis	Popular method after WWII.	The Coming Race (1871) by Edward Bulwer-Lytton
Neural changes	Language skills treated as encoded data.	The Linguist (1975) by Tak Hallus
Sleep-learning	Characters learn an unfamiliar language in their sleep.	Sweet Helen by Charles W. Runyon (character wakes up knowing 2000 words of Eutrian vocabulary)
Electric shocks	Different outcomes in different works; some good for language learning, while others bad.	Eutopia by Poul Anderson
Chemicals	Use of drugs and other chemical substances.	Eutopia by Poul Anderson
Genetic alteration	Similar to viruses being used as vectors in gene therapy.	Rammer by Larry Niven
Genetic alteration	Drugs are used to alter either DNA or RNA.	Transit to Scorpio by Alan Burt Akers

When it comes to details in language learning, Meyers claims that some information "may have been extracted from professional and academic journals, [but] they are more likely to have come from general sources". Sources, from which journals are found, include National Geographic, Science Magazine, and Science News-letter, under the categories of learning and memory, rather than linguistics journals.

Some authors might make it such that a character required to learn a language is naturally skilled at doing so. Such characters are usually super-humanly efficient language learners. One such example is John Carter, a character in Edgar Rice Burrough’s Barsoom series. Similar to this strategy, other authors make the unfamiliar language simple to learn; one such example can be seen in Across the Zodiac by Percy Greg. Despite Greg’s description of the language as simple, the structure of the language is still that of an Indo-European language. This makes the language only simple to the author whose very own language is Indo-European. When languages are simple, John Krueger argues that authors cannot resist the temptation of making it difficult in some aspect of language. Although, difficulty in phonology can be justified considering alien anatomy.

There are still authors who do away with the need for language learning altogether. For example, in Doorway in the Sand by Roger Zelazny, Zelazny introduced an interpreter to resolve the language barrier between his human and alien characters . This way, he circumvented the need for any language learning process. (Related to: Alien Communication)

In his book, Meyers wrote that authors have a preconceived notion that language learning is hard and even labelled Childhood’s End by Arthur C. Clarke as being overrated for equating language learning to the construction of the pyramids.

It is also noted in Ria Cheyne's article, Created Languages in Science Fiction, in the journal of Science Fiction Studies, that:

"In this way, the encounter with the alien language is the encounter with the alien: the created language is both the means by which information about the alien is communicated and the form that brings these beings into life."

The difficulty of learning a truly Alien language is a main theme in Suzette Haden Elgin's novel Native Tongue.

== Language medium ==
With invented species, aliens, and other such characters in science fiction comes not only constructed languages but also new mediums using which these characters speak. As Meyers points out:

"... the science fiction writer frequently invents both the message and the medium."

=== Auditory ===
A common medium of communication employed by science fiction authors is the familiar one of vocal-auditory used by humans. In order to make this more exotic and suited to the alien theme of the story, some writers choose to tweak the method of producing this medium of communication. This could come in the form of a difference in physiology or structure of the alien as seen in Isaac Asimov’s Hostess. In his story, Asimov’s alien is described as having a different mouth structure to a human, although his speech sounds similar to that of a human on Earth:

"The construction of his mouth, combined with an absence of incisors, gave a whistling sound to the sibilants. Aside from that, he might have been born on Earth for all the accent his speech showed."

Gordon R. Dickson describes just as much in his work The Christmas Present (see: The Star Road), with the jellyfish-like alien described as having a voice that was:

"...croaky and unbeautiful, for a constricted air-sac is not built for the manufacture of human words."

John Brunner also goes into detail about the method of sound production of his aliens in his work The Dramaturges of Yan, writing that the aliens had lungs at their sides,

"...drawing in air directly through spiracles between the ribs; like bagpipes, they had continual through-put. Sound to talk with was generated by a tympanal membrane and relayed through resonating chambers in the gullet, giving a rather pleasant, if not monotonous, timbre; in Kaydad’s case, resembling a cello droning away on a single note…"

Cyril M. Kornbluth uses a rather different method from these in his work Friend to Man (see: The Explorers (collection)), in which the alien resembles a cello in the way it produces sound and not just in the way it sounds. This method of producing sound is described in the following excerpt of an interaction between the alien and a man named Smith who was rescued by the alien:

""Salt?" asked Smith, his voice thin in the thin air. "I need salt with water."

The thing rubbed two appendages together and he saw a drop of amber exude and spread on them. It was, he realised a moment later, rosining the bow, for the appendages drew across each other and he heard a whining, vibrating cricket voice say: "S-s-z-z-aw-w?"

It did better the next time. The amber drop spread, and "S-z-aw-t?" was sounded, with a little tap of the bow for the final phoneme."

This theme of aliens producing sound in a way similar to a musical instrument (and perhaps physically resembling one as well) is continued by James Blish in his work This Earth of Hours. In the story, the aliens are known as "Callëans" and the character, 12-UpJohn, discovers how they speak, saying:

"... the sounds issued at low volume from a multitude of spiracles or breath-holes all along the body, each hole producing only one pure tone, the words and intonations being formed in mid-air by intermodulation - a miracle of co-ordination among a multitude of organs obviously unsuitable for sound-forming at all."

The theme of musical communication has appeared in science fiction as early as 1638 in Francis Godwin’s work The Man in the Moone. It also appeared in Winfred P. Lehmann’s Decoding of the Martian Language. Since W. P. Lehmann is a linguist, his story was explained in far greater scientific detail than most other science fiction authors. One of the central characters of the 2021 novel Project Hail Mary by Andy Weir is an alien whose language is musical. The novel circumvents the issue of communication by having the responsible scientist map (using a computer) each unique sound in the alien language to a word in English. The computer containing this "dictionary" records and translates the alien's words. This musical language is part of the score of the 2026 film adaptation of the novel.

When it comes to the auditory medium, however, there is also communication at frequencies above and below that of what is audible to humans. For example, in Henry Kuttner’s The Big Night, the aliens communicate using frequencies below what is audible to humans (subsonics) and wear a device to increase this frequency to one that is audible to humans when communicating with them. In Mission of Gravity by Hal Clement, the alien is able to communicate in both a frequency higher than what is perceived by humans and a frequency perceivable by humans. The aliens in In a Good Cause— by Isaac Asimov had similar abilities, having a specialised organ for the higher frequencies and a separate one for frequencies audible to humans.

More science fiction stories involving the vocal-auditory medium as a means of communication include Proxima Centauri (short story) by Murray Leinster, Arrival (film) (although the aliens in Arrival had two mediums of communication, one vocal-auditory and the other through visuals), and in Star Trek, where alien communication is prevalent.

=== Visual ===
The second most popular choice of language medium in science fiction is the visual medium or sight. One such story using this medium is Venus on the Half-Shell by Kilgore Trout (Philip José Farmer), in which the aliens used their limbs to make signs in order to communicate:

""What do they talk with?" Simon said to Chworktap.

"They use their fingers, just like deaf-and-dumb people."

… Their arms came out, the fingers wriggling and crossing and bending as they asked each other what in the hell these strangers were and what did they mean to do?"

James Blish also explored the use of visual medium in communication in his work VOR. In the story, the alien communicated using colour-shifts in the light spectrum (displayed colours on the front of its head). Similar to this was the aliens in Rex Gordon’s First on Mars/No Man Friday, in which the aliens (as big as freight trains) also communicated using light with the main character remarking "...there simply has not been on Earth such a colloquy of light.". In What Is This Thing Called Love? by Isaac Asimov, the aliens also communicated through colour, using colour patches that changed hue to communicate. In Death and Designation Among the Asadi by Michael Bishop (author), Bishop describes in detail a similar form of communication:

"As for the staring matches, they’re of brief duration and involve fierce gesticulation and mane-shaking. In these head-to-head confrontations the eyes change colour with astonishing rapidity, flashing through the entire visible spectrum -and maybe beyond- in a matter of seconds. I am now prepared to say that these instantaneous changes of eye color are the Asadi equivalent of speech…"

=== Olfactory ===
Although much more challenging to employ, smell has also been used as a medium of communication by science fiction authors. In Doomship by Frederik Pohl and Jack Williamson, the aliens (T’worlies) communicate through smells. As noticed by a human character in the story,

"The vinegary smell deepened. It was a sign of polite cogitation in a T’worlie, like a human being’s hmmm"

Similar to this method of communication is one employed the alien species in Cabin Boy (see Far Out (book)) by Damon Knight. In this story, two humans attempt to communicate with the alien that uses scent, although this proves rather difficult:

"...there had been a series of separate odors, all unfamiliar and all overpoweringly strong. At least a dozen of them, Roget thought; they had gone past too quickly to count."

As Meyers points out, however, the challenge in "...using air-borne scents for communication is that even a casual breeze becomes "noise" in the system, blending odors and distorting their original sequence.". Then again, Colin Kapp overcomes this problem in his work The Old King’s Answers, in which the one character describes the aliens as having:

"...scent glands in the pads of their feet… They’ve settled on the flat faces of the crystal rocks when they really want to leave a message for the world."

The character further goes on to explain:

"Using chromatography, I’ve managed to identify three individual scent products, all of them remarkably persistent. They are combined together on the crystal faces in an amazing spectrum of complexity. In their scent-writing they have the capacity -though I’m not sure how much of it they utilize- to compress more bits of information in a given space than we humans can in our optical writing."

This medium of smell was also utilised by John Norman in his work Priest-Kings of Gor (Book 3 of Gor), in which the medium is not only described but the advantages and disadvantages of it is also discussed. In the story, the narrator describes the medium, saying:

"What in the passageways I had taken to be the scent of Priest-Kings had actually been the residue of odor-signals which Priest-Kings, like certain social insects of our world, use in communicating with one another."

The narrator then goes on to discuss in length the advantageous and disadvantageous of such a medium:

"Communication by odor-signals can in certain circumstances be extremely efficient, though it can be disadvantageous in others. For example, an odor can carry… much farther than can the shout or cry of a man to another man. Moreover, if not too much time is allowed to elapse, a Priest-King may leave a message in his chamber or in a corridor for another Priest-King, and the other may arrive later and interpret. A disadvantage of this mode of communication, of course, is that the message may be understood by strangers or by others for whom it is not intended. One must be careful of what one says in the tunnels of the Priest-Kings for one’s words may linger after one, until they sufficiently dissipate to be little more than a meaningless blur of scent."

Since Norman placed his setting in "tunnels", he rid himself of any problems posed by winds. A similar approach was taken by Hal Clement in his work Uncommon Sense, in which he had gotten rid of air altogether by assuming his setting to be an airless planet.

=== Kinesics ===
As explained by Meyers, gestures

"...are as arbitrary in their meanings as any spoken word: they depend for their intelligibility on the prior agreement by the members of the community."

This code-like aspect of gestures is seen in science fiction stories involving kinesics as a medium for language. One such example of this is seen in Orn (Book 2 of Of Man and Manta) by Piers Anthony. In this story, "manta-shaped flying fungoids" used kinesics for communication in that they snapped their tails once for ‘yes’ and twice for ‘no’ when communicating with humans. This code eventually evolved and allowed the fungoids to initiate conversation, "with that combination of gesture and tail snaps they had gradually worked out as their code".

In some cases, however, kinesics was not employed as a medium of communication on its own but together with other mediums. For example, in The Dance of the Changer and the Three by Terry Carr, the aliens called "Loarrans" communicated via "wave-dancing", which seemed in part an art form rather than just communication:

"The dance he went through to give the description was intricate and even imaginative… It used motion and color and sound and another sense something like smell."

In the case of the "Nildoror", aliens in Downward to the Earth by Robert Silverberg, they had no limbs that they were able to use to gesture (having walked on all fours). Hence, they had other appendages to do so. As the narrator explains:

"The spiny crest down the middle of the alien’s broad skull began to twitch… The nildoror had a rich language of gesture, employing not only the spines but also their long ropy trunks and their many-pleated ears,"

There are also some science fiction works that include tactile (touch) as a medium of communication. These include works such as The Persistence of Vision by John Varley, Memoirs of a Spacewoman by Naomi Mitchison, and The Word for World is Forest by Ursula K. Le Guin.

== Machine language ==
=== Machine speech ===
Machines have been another popular theme in science fiction works, appearing in works like I, Robot, Ex Machina, Chappie, 2001: A Space Odyssey, and even much older works such as The Moon is a Harsh Mistress by Robert A. Heinlein. In such works, machines are portrayed with the ability to speak just as well or even better than humans. This ability is almost always explained from the perspective of computer programming as was done in The Moon is a Harsh Mistress, although it has just as much to do with linguistics, especially in order to sound natural enough to be indistinguishable from a regular human.

Speech synthesis occurring in science fiction works can be categorised into two forms. The first form is synthesised speech, which is completely produced by the machine itself and is the form of speech synthesis portrayed by Robert A. Heinlein in The Moon is a Harsh Mistress. The second form appearing in science fiction works is one in which stored pre-recorded bits of human speech are assembled by the machine to form speech. This form of machine-generated speech appeared in works such as Autofac by Philip K. Dick, in which speech produced by the machine is void of any intonations or other prosody.

In more recent works, such as I, Robot, 2001: A Space Odyssey, and even the Iron Man trilogy (J.A.R.V.I.S.), machines are portrayed as having speech that sounds just as natural as that of a regular human. In The Machine by John W. Campbell (from The Best of John W. Campbell), the machine-produced voice was described as being "...peculiarly commanding, a superhuman voice of perfect clarity and perfect resonance. It was commanding, attracting, yet pleasant.". This manner of human-like speech can also be seen in You’ll take the High Road by John Brunner (from Three Trips in Time and Space) and Galactic Pot-Healer by Philip K. Dick. Ira Levin has also utilised the idea of fluent human-like speech in his science fiction work The Stepford Wives, in which human-like androids are made to replace men's wives after they have been murdered by their husbands. The androids, needing to be perfect copies of the women, use machine-generated voices that gain their vocabulary from recordings of the women’s actual voices.

However, in many other works, machine speech was used to portray "human depersonalisation". In Promises to Keep: A Science Fiction Drama from Alien Horizons by William F. Nolan, Nolan described the computerised ship’s voice as "metallic, emotionless". This portrayal could be traced back to even older works such as The Last Evolution by John W. Campbell in which machine speech is described as

"...the vibrationally correct, emotionless tones of all the race of machines."

Other work involving this theme of depersonalisation includes works such as It's Such a Beautiful Day by Isaac Asimov, The Quest for Saint Aquin by Anthony Boucher, The Hawks of Arcturus by Cecil Snyder, I, the Unspeakable by Walter J. Sheldon, and The Ship Who Sang by Anne McCaffrey.

Given the scientific capabilities to add prosody to machine-generated speech, Walter E. Meyers was critical of this use of emotionless machine speech in science fiction works, as shown from the following excerpt:

"...the problems of adding pitch, stress, and juncture (the transitions between words and phrases) to machine-produced speech were mastered well before William F. Nolan wrote the passage… Writers who now speak of emotionless mechanical voices do so either through ignorance or, more probably, because they value the symbolism involved more highly than scientific accuracy."

More works utilising the general theme of machine speech are Jamboree by Jack Williamson, Becalmed in Hell by Larry Niven, Starchild by Frederik Pohl and Jack Williamson (part of the Starchild Trilogy), Evane (1973) by E. C. Tubb, and Stranger Station by Damon Knight.

=== Automatic translators ===
In many works of science fiction with language as part of the plot, the idea of automatic translators has been frequently brought up. These translators can be split into two main types: translators translating from a known language to another known language, and those translating from an unknown language to a known language.

Walter E. Meyers noted that translators of the first kind (known-to-known) were usually small devices, "...typically worn as a pendent or pinned to the shirt". This can be seen in Jackal’s Meal (collected in The Star Road) by Gordon R. Dickson. Such a device also appeared in A Little Knowledge by Poul Anderson, in which a small device worn on the chest and called a ‘Vocalizer’ translated English into the known language of aliens. More works involving this type of automatic translators include The Brains of Earth by Jack Vance.

The second type of translator (unknown-to-known) seems to appear more often in science fiction works and can be alternatively known as a "Universal Translator". In I’ll Be Waiting for You When the Swimming Pool is Empty by James Tiptree Jr., the protagonist uses a universal translator called the ‘Omniglot Mark Eight Vocoder’ that instantly translates whatever is being said to the necessary alien language although the characters themselves do not know what language that is.

The universal translator also makes multiple appearances in science fiction movies and shows. In Men in Black (1997 film), a universal translator is introduced during the tour of the MIB headquarters. In Star Trek, a Universal Translator is frequently used to translate alien languages into known languages of the user. The 1991 Star Trek: The Next Generation episode Darmok plays further with the concept by introducing a civilization that makes heavy use of analogies. While the translator can give the equivalents of the words they use, it has no access to the cultural references that give them meaning. Doctor Who also played with the idea of a universal translator, with the universal translator being part of the TARDIS. This recurring theme of universal translators being part of a ship or mode of transport was also seen in Ringworld by Larry Niven.

Contrary to this theme, works such as "How the Heroes Die", also by Larry Niven, and Unhuman Sacrifice by Katherine Maclean portrayed the universal translator as a less portable, more fixed-in-place computer. Even further from this theme are works such as The Hitchhiker’s Guide to the Galaxy, in which the universal translator is not in the form of a machine at all. In The Hitchhiker’s Guide to the Galaxy, the universal translator exists instead as a ‘babel fish’ that is inserted into the ear.

== Animals and language ==
Science fiction plots concerning animals and language can to an extent be divided into two main themes, the first being the popular theme of teaching animals to produce human speech, and the second being the less popular theme of learning the language of the animals themselves.

=== Teaching animals human languages ===
As Meyers puts it, "We have long felt the desire, even the need, to speak to the creatures around us, which parrots and the like do little to satisfy". A great example of such a desire is seen from the Planet of the Apes movie franchise. This desire is also explored by older works such as Clifford D Simak’s Census, one of the tales appearing in his work City. In the story, a character named Bruce Webster surgically alters dogs to give them the ability to speak. Harlan Ellison also explores a similar theme in his work A Boy and His Dog, in which a dog named "Blood" is capable of speech, speaking perhaps even better than his human, Vic. Blood, however, speaks through telepathy rather than actual outspoken speech (see: Telepathy).

Another instance similar to Blood but involving communicating out loud is the horse from Dream Done Green by Alan Dean Foster. In the story, the human character Micah Schell discovers a hormone that is capable of enabling higher mammals to have the mental abilities of at least a human 10-year-old. One horse, however, far exceeds this and is capable of speaking 18 languages, with the sound of his speech being described as:

"a mellow tenor that tended to rise on concluding syllables, only to break and drop like a whitecap on the sea before the next word."

Science fiction authors dealing with this theme of animals capable of human speech mostly suggest a physical change that allows animals to have the capacity for human speech, especially considering the differences in sound production through the vocal tract between animals and humans. One writer that explicitly states this physical change is James H. Schmitz in his work The Demon Breed. In this story, Sweeting, one of three 7.5 foot otters capable of speech is described as being "a product of a geneticist’s miscalculation". The ancestors of Sweeting are said to have been

"... a development of a preserved Teran otter strain, tailored for an oceanic existence. The coastal rancher who’d brought the consignment was startled some months later when the growing cubs began to address him in a slurrily chopped-up version [of his language]."

While such cases of genetic mutation have been used as a common mechanism to explain changes enabling animals to execute human speech production, some authors of science fiction at times do not use it correctly. For example, in the case of The Blue Giraffe by L. Sprague de Camp, the offspring of baboons mutated through exposure to radiation are described to have physically altered only in size and yet were able to speak in Xhosa that was taught to them by a ranger in the wildlife preserve they inhabited. As Meyers noted of de Camp’s writing,

"Computer simulation of primate vocal range was unknown when de Camp wrote, of course, but there had been indications, even in science fiction itself, that without changes in bone structure and musculature, the baboons could not have mastered the phonology of Xhosa or any other human language."

A good example of a detailed explanation into human speech production in primates can be seen in Pithecanthropus Rejectus by Manly Wade Wellman. In the story, Wellman details the problems faced by the character, an ape, in human speech production as well as how it was overcome by "the Doctor", another character in the story.

"As I learned to speak and to comprehend, I found out the cause of those pains. I was told by the tall, smiling blond woman who taught me to call her ‘Mother’. She explained that I had been born with no opening in the top of my skull - so needed for bone and brain expansion - and that the man of the house - ‘Doctor’ - had made such an opening governing the growth of my cranium and later stopping the hole with a silver plate. My jaw, too, had been altered with silver, for when I was born it had been too shallow and narrow to give my tongue play. The building of a chin for me and the remodeling of several tongue-muscles had made it possible for me to speak."

Another method used by science fiction writers to introduce physical changes enabling human speech production in non-human animals is genetic engineering. This method appeared in Doomship by Frederik Pohl and Jack Williamson. In the story, Pohl and Williamson also describe the challenges involved in human speech production by non-human animals:

"A chimpanzee is simply not human. His physiology is one count against him. He cannot develop the brain of a human being because his skull is the wrong shape - and because the chemistry of his blood does not carry enough nourishment to meet the demands of abstract thought. He cannot fully master speech because he lacks the physical equipment to form the wide variety of phonemes in human language. The molecular-biology people knew how to deal with that. They could do things like widening the angle of the cranium called the kyphosis, thus allowing the brain to round out full frontal lobes, or restructuring tongue and palate, even adding new serum components to the blood like the alpha2 globulins that bind human hemoglobin."

Issues with cognitively enhanced animals (uplifted) learning human languages is a theme in the Uplift Universe novels by David Brin. The dolphins in Startide Rising speak three languages: Primal, Trinary and Anglic. Primal and Trinary are represented as haiku-esque poems, while Anglic is a hypothetical English-derivative rendered for the reader as standard English.

=== Humans learning animal languages ===
When it comes to the less popular and much rarer theme of humans learning the languages of the animals, there are only few examples present in science fiction works. Known examples would include the following:

Title and author	Plot summary
The Bees of Knowledge by Barrington J. Bayley	The main character attempts, unsuccessfully, to communicate with giant alien bees who hold him captive, using knowledge of bee communication on Earth.
Interface by A. A. Attanasio	An investigator raises a boy and dolphin together from childhood in attempts to have communication between them both
People of the Sea / Dolphin Island (novel) by Arthur C. Clarke	A device is built for communication between humans and dolphins.

In Clarke’s story, however, the device, resembling an over-sized wrist watch, would convert pre-selected words (appearing as buttons on the device) into the language of dolphins. This does not really involve learning the animal language itself but rather relies on a translation device (Related to Automatic Translators). However this does imply that the animal language has already been decoded and learnt, for the device to work.

== Telepathy ==
Telepathy has been a recurring motif (narrative) in science fiction stories, for the most part being used as a convenient tool to bypass linguistic problems that writers encounter. This is illustrated in H. G. Wells’s Men Like Gods (1923). In this science fiction story, telepathy is used in daily communications, although the accuracy of what is communicated differs from person to person, with thought being rephrased and reflected based on the receiver's linguistic ability. Wells, through his character's dialogue, directly mentions how convenient a solution telepathy is to linguistic problems such as language barriers (related to: Alien Communication):

"And all things considered, it is really very convenient for us that there should be this method of transmission. For otherwise, I do not see how we could have avoided weeks of linguistic bother, first principles of our respective grammars, logic, significs, and so forth, boring stuff for the most part, before we could have got to anything like our present understanding"

However, while conveniently giving a solution to that linguistic issue, Wells's form of telepathy seemed to create problems for other aspects of linguistics. Given that language change is a result of variations in speech, Walter E. Meyers suggested that this telepathy would result in an obstruction to language evolution (see: Evolutionary Change).

"...a universal telepathic power would slow down, and perhaps even halt [language] change altogether, if (and this is an important condition) change in language results from normal but inevitable variation in speech forms"

Although affecting speech, telepathy would not isolate writing from changes, as illustrated by Burrough in his Martian novels, where Mars has several forms of written language despite having only one spoken language.

As noted by Walter E. Meyers, Wells use of telepathy implies that:

"...telepathy transmits linguistic constructions"

In doing so, however, differences between linguistic, lexical, and even cultural concepts of different language speakers would still hinder understanding between speakers using telepathy. The challenges presented by cultural barriers, for example, was presented in the work Prott by Margaret St. Clair, in which a telepath laments that despite conducting 52 interviews with aliens named "Prott" he has been unable to learn much. As John W. Campbell pointed out in an editorial (see: Analog Science Fiction and Fact: Astounding, June 1941)

"Most of our words have background references that we know so well we tend to overlook them."

As per this quote, these background references may be easily understood by speakers of a language but not to the rest. Paul A. Carter summarised this well, explaining that "... in situations demanding discernment of the cultural context of words, there might be trouble.".

Given such a problem, some science-fiction writers suggested pictures were transmitted via telepathy instead of words. This could be seen in works like Judith Merril’s Whoever You Are and Michael Elder’s Flight to Terror (also known as Perfumed Planet). However, the process of transmitting pictures still involves a hidden form of linguistic structure, as mentioned by Meyers:

"It is difficult to divorce the transmission of information in whatever medium from predications; introspection, if we can rely on it, seems to confirm that we think in linguistic structures."

This brings back the question of barriers in language mentioned before. Stanley G. Weinbaum attempted to address this issue in his work The Lotus Eaters, where the partly telepathetic alien learned the language from humans through its ability to read links between words as well as the conceptual meanings of the words, though only after the words are used by the humans. One other example of this concept of telepathy being limited to the surface of one’s conscious mind appears in To Die in Italbar by Roger Zelazny.

Robert Heinlein’s Time for the Stars, however, presents a rather convincing argument that words, and not pictures, are transmitted through telepathy. In the novel, the characters tried telepathy without using any words, but found "...the silly, incoherent rumbling that went on in [the other’s] mind in place of thought was as confusing and annoying, as senseless as finding yourself inside another person’s dream. The habitual receiving of each other’s thoughts as words was explained by the psychologist in the novel as:

"The ears and eyes and fingers are just data collectors; it is the brain that abstracts order out of chaos of data and gives it meaning… You expect words, your brain ‘hears’ words; it is a process used to and knows how to handle."

Despite all these explanations offered by science fiction authors, telepathy still seems to be something unknown. As written in Blind Alley by Isaac Asimov:

"Telepathy! Telepathy! Telepathy! Might as well say by witch brew; Nobody knows anything about telepathy except its name. What is the mechanism of telepathy? What is the physiology and the physics of it?"

Several characters in science fiction novels do attempt to explore the workings of telepathy, however, such as the characters in Walter M. Miller Jr.’s Command Performance, or Fritz Leiber’s Deadly Moon.

Regardless of the reason behind the use of telepathy by authors of science fiction, whether a real interest in the topic or convenience, it is as Meyers points out:

"...there is no question that writers find the subject a fertile one for an array of linguistic functions."

== Dystopian and utopian works ==
In Aliens and Linguists: Language Study and Science Fiction, Walter E. Meyers stated that whether a work is dystopian or utopian is a matter of perspective. To decide if a science fiction piece is intended by the author to be a dystopia or a utopia, Meyers argued, it is helpful to examine the language use in the fictional world of the book. The method that Meyers suggested in his book is not one of stylistics but to instead study how the language(s) spoken by characters are dictated, or not, by their leaders. According to Meyers, 30% to 50% of science fiction works touch on language in some ways while a high percentage of utopian science fiction works have language as a concern; at the same time, the importance of language can be missed by science fiction authors.

For this type of analysis, Meyers established that works of science fiction intended as dystopian would involve thought control by fictional governments, often done through the control of the language of their fictional citizens. This means that more often than not, science fiction authors who touch on language are subscribers of the Sapir-Whorf hypothesis.

This type of language control can be seen in George Orwell’s Nineteen Eighty-Four, in the use of Newspeak, which was aimed at making unorthodox political thought impossible. A Voyage to the Country of the Houyhnhnms by Jonathan Swift is another example of this control. In his book, Meyers described Swift’s manipulation in the novel as "eliminat[ing] dissent by destroying the ability of language to express fictions, theories, falsehoods, indeed, anything other than a statement of fact". In short, Swift’s manipulation of language was an attempt to manipulate reality in his novel.

For these authors’ dystopian governments to work, Meyers argued that they "must not only enslave words, but also prevent the natural forces of languages from freeing them". This was because language change could become a form of liberation; words for dissent can be borrowed from other languages, made from existing words or coined entirely anew. To prevent language change from happening, authors wrote certain preventative measures into their stories.

Aspect of Language Change	Preventative Measures	Appearing Works
New vocabulary from borrowing	Forbid foreign contact. Forbid foreign language learning.	Walden Two by B. F. Skinner People were not allowed contact with the outside world and any time outside the present. Author described books as "ancient junk".
New vocabulary made from existing words	Regulate meanings of words through official dictionaries. Total control of education, indoctrinate populace.	The Dispossessed: An Ambiguous Utopia by Ursula Le Guin Characters were forced to memorise dictionaries and word use was dictated. A language was designed to embody the principles of the society of the book. Walden Two by B. F. Skinner The government of the book adds books to their libraries as often as they remove books as a form of censorship.
New vocabulary coined anew	Almost impossible to forestall, try to interrupt spread instead. Control means of communication and jail creators to prevent future attempts.	Walden Two by B. F. Skinner Language use was dictated, people had no access to private radios and were not allowed to turn off the national radio.

Meyers also claimed that languages were used in science fiction as a tool for world building where authors often manipulated language in order to make their fictional worlds a dystopian one. Meyers even went as far as to claim that the genre was "especially suited" for giving instruction about language.

Meyers also lamented on the different ways science fiction missed out on opportunities to make a well-rounded and holistic manipulation of language for world building. One example he gave was of The Troika Incident by James Cooke Brown. Brown wrote the novel to test, with Loglan, the Sapir-Whorf hypothesis. The characters in the novel were given the constructed language under the name Panlan to see if the constraints of the language would make their thought more logical. Given its utopian nature, Brown wrote the novel such that Loglan speakers had a perfect feedback loop and kept improving the language as they spoke it, making it more logical. Loglan speakers, however, need to expand the vocabulary of Loglan for their society to function. Yet, as Meyers pointed out, Brown missed the opportunity to expand on how the language might evolve in the novel.

Meyers also mentioned specific examples of figurative and creative uses of language that would not work in Loglan, which Brown could have gone in depth about. For example, if there were a music band named The Killers in the fictional world of the novel, speakers would need to create a word in Loglan that could be glossed as kill.ɴᴍᴢ, yet can not be understood as a synonym of murderer. By design, creative word use would not work in Loglan. Additionally, Meyers commented that Brown neglected the possibility of language change in his fictional world, which might have made Loglan less logical than he would have liked.

Meyers also argued that if fictional societies in science fiction were great, they were so "in spite of a language designed for propaganda and a government willing to employ it"

== See also ==
- Bongo-Bongo (linguistics)
- Elvish languages (Middle-earth)
- Folk linguistics
- List of common misconceptions about language learning
- Perceptual dialectology
