= Walter E. Meyers =

American linguist, science fiction scholar, and educator (1939–2022)

Walter Earl Meyers
- Born: July 1, 1939; Pittsburgh, Pennsylvania, U.S.
- Died: March 31, 2022 (aged 82); Cary, North Carolina, U.S.
- Occupations: Professor of English, North Carolina State University; Video game programmer
- Spouse: Julia Roberta Reed (m. 1961–2022)
- Children: 4

Walter E. Meyers (July 1, 1939 – March 31, 2022) was an American academic, Professor of English at North Carolina State University (NCSU) in Raleigh, and a linguist.

He remains best known as the author of the seminal study Aliens and Linguists: Language Study and Science Fiction (1980), which won the South Atlantic Modern Language Association Award. Peter Nicholls and John Clute, editors of The Encyclopedia of Science Fiction, praise it as "an excellent and amusing work on linguistics in science fiction." David Langford likewise calls it "by far the best study of the topic."

Science fiction author Suzette Haden Elgin, herself a linguist and a respected figure in the field of constructed languages, wrote, "I'm convinced that Aliens and Linguists would hold my attention even if I had no interest in either of its paired topics."

== Early life and education ==
Walter Earl Meyers was born to Walter Frederick and Margaret Josephine Meyers on July 1, 1939 in Pittsburgh, Pennsylvania. He had four siblings: Linda, Janet, Christopher, and David, and was known as "Buddy" to family and friends. He attended St. Wendelin High School, then located in Pittsburgh, Pennsylvania, and enlisted in the United States Army immediately after graduating.

Shipped out to Monterey, California, and always interested in languages, Meyers studied Russian at the Defense Language Center there at the Presidio. He was stationed in Nottau, Germany while he worked at the central communications monitoring station for American intelligence at what would become the ECHELON project in Bad Aibling.

After his military service, Walter attended Duquesne University in Pittsburgh, Pennsylvania, and graduated with a Bachelor of Arts in history (with honors). There he earned a Danforth Fellowship and a National Defense Education Act Fellowship to cover his tuition and expenses while he pursued Doctoral studies in English Literature from the University of Florida in Gainesville. His doctoral thesis formed the basis of his first book, A Figure Given: Typology in the Wakefield Plays, and he graduated with a PhD in Medieval Literature.

== Career ==
Dr. Meyers was a scholar of philology and Medieval studies, two sciences which informed his writings. His specialties in science fiction criticism began with an early emphasis on authors including C.S. Lewis (Note: Although the hero of C. S. Lewis's Space Trilogy (1938-1945) is a philologist, and linguistics is the central problem in the first volume, Out of the Silent Planet, and is important in Perelandra and That Hideous Strength, Meyers made almost no mention of these works in Aliens and Linguists. He covered them instead in two essays for the encyclopedic Survey of Modern Fantasy Literature, first and second editions, issued by Salem Press.) and J.R.R Tolkien.

Meyers also taught courses in science fiction and fantasy literature from the 1970s with his friend, the science fiction author John Kessel, another professor at NCSU. One did not find science fiction as a college course often in those days, but Meyers' were popular, and respected even in Europe. Peter Nicholls recognized this in The Encyclopedia of Science Fiction when, in his article "SF in the Classroom," he wrote, "The standard of books aimed at university-level readers and graduates ranges bafflingly from the opaque and semiliterate to the stimulating and rigorous, and their sheer volume – as suggested under Critical and Historical Works About SF – is now dizzying." Alongside "the more important (English-language) academic authors to have written books in this field" — besides such luminaries as Patrick Parrinder, James E. Gunn, Brian Stableford, and Gary K. Wolfe — Nicholls lists Meyers.

As a member of the Science Fiction Research Association, Meyers was for some years on the Committee which awarded its Pilgrim Award for Lifetime Achievement in the field of science fiction scholarship.

=== Aliens and Linguists ===
This book reveals Dr. Meyers' comprehensive reading in the genres, from Mary Shelley's Frankenstein and H. G. Wells's The Time Machine through the early pulps and the Golden Age of science fiction, to the late 1970s. He analyzes what he sees as widespread confusion as to the dynamic nature of languages, and ignorance of linguistic evolution and interbreeding, among authors who were more likely to focus on physics in their fiction. Suzette Haden Elgin expresses her own frustrations as she shares his: "The sf writer who misplaces a star in the heavens or miscalculates a parabola will get baskets of letters from readers, all gleefully pointing out the scientific error. But errors in linguistic science, even at the most elementary level, slide right by. [...] The point here isn't that readers are being asked to accept a literary 'convention,' the way they accept talking animals in fables, and are agreeing to do that for the sake of getting on with the story. That would be perfectly all right. The point is that neither reader nor writer, so far as anyone can tell, is aware that there's a problem."

The book journeys along the linguistic highways and byways of science fiction, with stops at many of the genre's major thematic milestones — such as time travel stories, opportunities for First Contact with extraterrestrials, the universal translator, tales of alternate history and parallel universes, neologisms, dystopian language and propaganda, (Note: For extensive discussion of Meyers' treatment of dystopian speech in science fiction, see Julie Millward's doctoral thesis "Dystopian Wor(l)ds: Language Within and Beyond Experience", University of Sheffield, 2006.) and the rise of technobabble. Each of these is an occasion for remarking how languages differ and change. Yet, as Dagmar Barnouw wrote, "Too many SF writers are either not aware of or don't want to deal with the fact that languages change. In the year 2500 — the very near future in terms of SF time — English will have changed: how to anticipate such changes intelligently and consistently and how to make them palatable to the reader is a problem that has proved, to Meyers' disappointment, almost unsolvable to SF writers."

Meyers covers many dozens of authors and texts in his study. Authors receiving praise include Ursula K. LeGuin, Frank Herbert, Alfred Bester, Anthony Burgess (whose A Clockwork Orange earned attention for decades), Ian Watson, Philip José Farmer, L. Sprague deCamp, and Fletcher Pratt. The majority receiving mixed reviews and gentle chiding include Isaac Asimov, James Blish (for whom he wrote an admiring "Introduction" to the 1989 A Case of Conscience collector's edition), A.E. van Vogt, Jack Vance, Anthony Boucher, and John W. Campbell. For an assortment of linguistic misdemeanors, authors Arthur C. Clarke, Larry Niven, and others come in for a roasting. Yet, as Barnouw says, "Pleasantly sensible and concerned about communicating with his readers, Meyers is neither too credulous nor too condescending in his approach to the large number of SF texts dealing[,] in various ways, with language."

Elgin wrote, "The two chapters devoted to the history of linguistics in sf are superb." The first is primarily about J.R.R Tolkien and his invented Elvish languages. She admires Meyers' "history of the Elvish phenomenon (along with a detailed translation of a Quenya poem and a mini-glossary)," and goes on to praise his ensuing discussion of the Sapir-Whorf hypothesis. The second of these chapters is more specialized, dealing with Alfred Korzybski's development of general semantics (and its political applications) and the theories of Noam Chomsky, "the father of modern linguistics." Meyers then tackles some difficult novels devoted to linguistics: Samuel R. Delany's Babel-17 (1966) and Triton (1976) and Ian Watson's 1973 The Embedding.

Aliens and Linguists was updated a decade later, to include further examples, as "The Language and Languages of Science Fiction" in Fictional Space: Essays on Contemporary Science Fiction, a 1991 academic anthology edited by Tom Shippey.

==== Critical reception ====
In a vast survey of science fiction scholarship from 1980 to 1999, Veronica Hollinger highlights "a range of quite specialized materials which are also well worth looking into: one of the most useful, for instance, is Gary K. Wolfe's Critical Terms for Science Fiction and Fantasy: A Glossary and Guide to Scholarship (1986)"; and the other she promotes is Aliens and Linguists. In 2004, Istvan Csicsery-Ronay, Jr. wrote, "Meyers's book is still useful and entertaining, but it is somewhat old-fashioned and anchored in the genteel philological tradition concerned with the evolution of language. For Meyers, actually existing sf is a museum of folly about the real language. The genre has unique potential to show how language might behave under the changed conditions of the future, on other worlds, or in alien minds; but most sf writers, in Meyers's view, depict alien and future languages with much less knowledge and concern than they do the physics and biologies of their imaginary worlds. Nothing marks Meyers's nostalgia for the philological better than his plea to regard The Lord of the Rings (1954-55) as a work of sf because of Tolkien's construction of the Elvish tongue on principles as rigorously faithful to evolutionary linguistics as Hal Clement was to physics in Mission of Gravity (1953). In the age of the Klingon Language Institute, we need to cast the net wider."

William A. Quinn, Distinguished Professor of Late Medieval Poetry at the University of Arkansas, considers the utility of Meyers' book in pedagogy. "He wishes to demonstrate both the uses of linguistics as a test for the plausibility (and, therefore, artistry) of science fiction, and the uses of science fiction as a honeyed cup of myrrh 'especially suited for giving instruction about language' (p. 209). The former focus is far and away Meyers' dominant concern and the more rewarding of the two. Since Meyers himself demonstrates again and again the linguistic misconceptions that riddle such conventions of science fiction as first-contacts, telepathy, 'automatic translators,' and the like, the use of science fiction to teach accurate linguistics must be confined to a very limited canon," such as The Lord of the Rings and Nineteen Eighty-Four.

=== Other works ===
Dr. Meyers was also the author of A Figure Given: Typology in the Wakefield Plays, a study of the Wakefield Cycle. This is a manuscript containing thirty-two Medieval mystery plays, written in Middle English, and with some mystery surrounding their authorship.

His 1974 Handbook of Contemporary English is a 500-page, illustrated textbook on grammar and rhetoric. In 1979 he wrote Combining Sentences with Michelle Rippon, a textbook on composition and writing sentences.

A playful 1975 article, "Cute: An Underground Meaning", published in American Speech, caught the eye of the humorous journal Annals of Improbable Research. Meyers was cited in a very short bibliography (only six peer-reviewed articles) of "Research Reports that are Icky and/or Cutesy." The Annals of Improbable Research is responsible for presenting the annual, satirical Ig Nobel Prize.

== Personal life ==
Meyers married Julia Roberta Reed in 1961, and they raised four children, Matthew, Michael, Sarah Marie and Julian, and had nine grandchildren.

After several years of declining health, with his family around him, Meyers died in Cary, North Carolina, on March 31, 2022, at the age of 82.

== Selected bibliography ==
=== Books ===
- A Figure Given: Typology in the Wakefield Plays. (Duquesne studies: Philological series, v. 14.) (A Modern Humanities Research Association monograph.) Pittsburgh: Duquesne University Press, 1969.
- Handbook of Contemporary English. New York: Harcourt Brace Jovanovich, 1974. ISBN 9-780-15530-848-0
- A Bibliography of Animal Communication Studies, 1965-1974. (1976?) (Note: A single copy of this work is held at the University of Pennsylvania's Van Pelt Library, and its brief catalog record says that it consists of xii, 51 leaves and includes indexes. It is likely that Meyers typed it up and intended it to be useful for himself and local library users, since he did not attempt to publish it.)
- Combining Sentences, co-authored with Michelle Rippon. New York: Harcourt Brace Jovanovich, 1979. ISBN 978-015512-250-5
- Combining Sentences: Instructor's Manual with Answer Key, co-authored with Michelle Rippon. New York: Harcourt Brace Jovanovich, 1979. ISBN 978-015512-251-2
- Aliens and Linguists: Language Study and Science Fiction. Athens: The University of Georgia Press, 1980. ISBN 9-780-82030-487-8

=== Essays ===
(Titles are listed chronologically, then alphabetically when falling within the same year.)

- "Literary Terms and Jakobson's Theory of Communication" (April 1969), in College English Vol. 30, No. 7, pp. 518–526.
- "A Commentary on "John Crowe Ransom's Poetic Revisions" with Samuel H. Woods, Jr. and David Mann (May 1970), in Publications of the Modern Language Association of America, v. 85, No. 3, pp. 532–534. (at JSTOR)
- "Handbooks, Subhandbooks, and Nonhandbooks: Texts for Freshman English" (March 1971) in College English v. 32, pp 716–724.
- "Books: Handbooks, Subhandbooks, and Nonhandbooks: Texts for Freshman English" (March 1971) in College English v. 32, p. 716.
- "Reply to Harvey S. Wiener" (December 1971) in College English v. 33, pp 355–356.
- "A Study of Usage Items" (May 1972) in College Composition and Communication, v. 23, p. 155.
- "Can (And Should) Standard American English Be Defined?" (1974) (Note: This was an 11-page paper, apparently presented at a conference, on the difficulties in defining Standard American English, and whether we need to. Meyers, rather typically in view of his preference for linguistic descriptivism, concluded that there is no real Standard American English to define, and thus no pressing need to define it. The manuscript is held at the Louisiana State University Main Library.)
- "And Neither Do the Purists: To Geneva Smitherman", in College English (March 1974) v. 35, No. 6, pp. 725–729. (at JSTOR)
- "Cute: An Underground Meaning" (Spring-Summer 1975) in American Speech v. 50, no. 1, pp. 135–137. (at JSTOR)
- "The Future History and Development of the English Language" (July 1976), in Science-Fiction Studies #9 = v. 3, Part 2, pp. 130–142. Reprinted in Science-Fiction Studies, Second Series: Selected Articles on Science Fiction, 1976-1977, ed. R. D. Mullen and Darko Suvin. Boston: Gregg Press, 1978.
- "And Chaos Died" (1970) by Joanna Russ, in Survey of Science Fiction Literature, ed. Frank N. Magill. Vol. 1. Salem Press, 1979. pp. 53–57.
- "At the Earth's Core" (1914) by Edgar Rice Burroughs, in Survey of Science Fiction Literature, ed. Frank N. Magill. Vol. 1. Salem Press, 1979. pp. 93–96.
- "Berserker" (1967) by Fred Saberhagen, in Survey of Science Fiction Literature, ed. Frank N. Magill. Vol. 1. Salem Press, 1979. pp. 168–172.
- "Brain Wave" (1954) by Poul Anderson, in Survey of Science Fiction Literature, ed. Frank N. Magill. Vol. 1. Salem Press, 1979. pp. 242–246.
- "First on Mars" (1956) by Rex Gordon, in Survey of Science Fiction Literature, ed. Frank N. Magill. Vol. 2. Salem Press, 1979. pp. 787–791.
- "The High Crusade" (1960) by Poul Anderson, in Survey of Science Fiction Literature, ed. Frank N. Magill. Vol. 2. Salem Press, 1979. pp. 977–980.
- "The Land That Time Forgot" (1918) by Edgar Rice Burroughs, in Survey of Science Fiction Literature, ed. Frank N. Magill. Vol. 3. Salem Press, 1979. pp. 1130–1134.
- "Last Man, The" (1826) by Mary Shelley, in Survey of Science Fiction Literature, ed. Frank N. Magill. Vol. 3. Salem Press, 1979. pp. 1151–1155.
- "Martian Odyssey and Other Science Fiction Tales, A" (1949) by Stanley G. Weinbaum, in Survey of Science Fiction Literature, ed. Frank N. Magill. Vol. 3. Salem Press, 1979. pp. 1353–1356.
- "Needle" (1950) by Hal Clement, in Survey of Science Fiction Literature, ed. Frank N. Magill. Vol. 3. Salem Press, 1979. pp. 1505–1509.
- "Orbitsville" (1975) by Bob Shaw, in Survey of Science Fiction Literature, ed. Frank N. Magill. Vol. 3. Salem Press, 1979. pp. 1617–1621.
- "Pellucidar" (1915) by Edgar Rice Burroughs, in Survey of Science Fiction Literature, ed. Frank N. Magill. Vol. 3. Salem Press, 1979. pp. 1665–1668.
- "A Plague of Demons" (1965) by Keith Laumer, in Survey of Science Fiction Literature, ed. Frank N. Magill. Vol. 4. Salem Press, 1979. pp. 1687–1691.
- "The Rim Worlds Series" (1958-1969) by A. Bertram Chandler, in Survey of Science Fiction Literature, ed. Frank N. Magill. Vol. 4. Salem Press, 1979. pp. 1789–1793.
- "Short Fiction of Edmond Hamilton, The", in Survey of Modern Fantasy Literature, ed. Frank N. Magill. Vol 4. Salem Press, Inc., 1979. pp. 1939–1943.
- "Short Fiction of Fritz Leiber, Jr., The", in Survey of Modern Fantasy Literature, ed. Frank N. Magill. Vol 4. Salem Press, Inc., 1979. pp. 1958–1962.
- "Space Lords" (1965) by Cordwainer Smith, in Survey of Science Fiction Literature, ed. Frank N. Magill. Vol. 5. Salem Press, 1979. pp. 2122–2126.
- "The Stainless Steel Rat Novels" (1957-2010) by Harry Harrison and others, in Survey of Modern Fantasy Literature, ed. Frank N. Magill. Vol 5. Salem Press, Inc., 1979. pp. 2136–2139.
- "That Hideous Strength" (1945) by C. S. Lewis, in Survey of Modern Fantasy Literature, ed. Frank N. Magill. Vol 5. Salem Press, Inc., 1979. pp. 2250–2254.
- "Hal, the Mirror of all Christian Kings," in A Fair Day in the Affections: Literary Essays in Honor of Robert B. White, Jr., edited by Jack D. Durant and M. Thomas Hester. Raleigh, N.C.: Winston Press, 1980, p. 67-77.
- "Brown, James Cooke" in Twentieth-Century Science-Fiction Writers, ed. Curtis C. Smith. New York: St. Martins, 1981. p. 75.
- "Karp, David" in Twentieth-Century Science-Fiction Writers, ed. Curtis C. Smith. New York: St. Martins, 1981. p. 291-292.
- "The Atlan Series" (1963-1977) by Jane Gaskell, in Survey of Science Fiction Literature, ed. Frank N. Magill. Vol. 1. Salem Press, 1983. pp. 66–68.
- "Book of the New Sun, The" (1980–1987) by Gene Wolfe, in Survey of Science Fiction Literature, ed. Frank N. Magill. Vol. 1. Salem Press, 1983. pp. 154–160.
- "Conjure Wife" (1943) by Fritz Leiber, in Survey of Science Fiction Literature, ed. Frank N. Magill. Vol. 1. Salem Press, 1983. pp. 314–318.
- "Fancies and Goodnights" (1951) by John Collier, in Survey of Modern Fantasy Literature, ed. Frank N. Magill. Vol 2. Salem Press, Inc., 1983. pp. 520–523.
- "Fantasy Games as Folk Literature" in Survey of Modern Fantasy Literature, ed. Frank N. Magill. Vol 5. Salem Press, Inc., 1983. pp. 2481–2491.
- "The Great Divorce" (1945) by C. S. Lewis, in Survey of Modern Fantasy Literature, ed. Frank N. Magill. Vol 2. Salem Press, Inc., 1983. pp. 635–637.
- "The Greater Trumps" (1932) by Charles Williams, in Survey of Modern Fantasy Literature, ed. Frank N. Magill. Vol 2. Salem Press, Inc., 1983. pp. 649–653.
- "Grendel" (1971) by John Gardner, in Survey of Modern Fantasy Literature, ed. Frank N. Magill. Vol 2. Salem Press, Inc., 1983. pp. 675–679.
- "Merlin Trilogy, The" (1980) by Mary Stewart, in Survey of Modern Fantasy Literature, ed. Frank N. Magill. Vol 2. Salem Press, Inc., 1983. pp. 1010–1014.
- "Shadows of Ecstasy" (1931) by Charles Williams, in Survey of Modern Fantasy Literature, ed. Frank N. Magill. Vol 3. Salem Press, Inc., 1983. pp. 1384–1386.
- "Short Fiction of Kuttner, The", in Survey of Modern Fantasy Literature, ed. Frank N. Magill. Vol 4. Salem Press, Inc., 1983. pp. 1592–1596.
- "Silver John Stories, The" by Manly Wade Wellman, in Survey of Modern Fantasy Literature, ed. Frank N. Magill. Vol 4. Salem Press, Inc., 1983. pp. 1744–1748.
- "Space Trilogy, The" (1938-1945) by C. S. Lewis, in Survey of Modern Fantasy Literature, ed. Frank N. Magill. Vol 4. Salem Press, Inc., 1983. pp. 1790–1797.
- "The Traveler in Black" (1971) by John Brunner, in Survey of Modern Fantasy Literature, ed. Frank N. Magill. Vol 4. Salem Press, Inc., 1983. pp. 1963–1965.
- "War in Heaven" (1932) by Charles Williams, in Survey of Modern Fantasy Literature, ed. Frank N. Magill. Vol 5. Salem Press, Inc., 1983. pp. 2063–2066.
- "Pilgrim Award Presentation to E. F. Bleiler" in the Science Fiction Research Association's SFRA Newsletter 123: 4-6 (July/August 1984)
- "Manly Wade Wellman" in Supernatural Fiction Writers, ed. E. F. Bleiler. New York: Scribner's, 1985. pp. 947–954.
- "Stephen R. Donaldson" in Supernatural Fiction Writers, ed. E. F. Bleiler. New York: Scribner's, 1985. pp. 1009–1014.
- "Pilgrim Award Presentation Speech, 1985," for Samuel R. Delany, in SFRA Newsletter 133:3-6 (August 1985)
- "Introduction" to A Case of Conscience by James Blish, Collector's Edition (Series: The Masterpieces of Science Fiction), by The Easton Press, 1989.
- "Concerning the Pilgrim Award", with Joan Gordon, (Note: This was a pithy exchange in the Correspondence & Notes column of a Science Fiction Studies Special Issue devoted to "Science Fiction by Women". Meyers discusses some controversy and politics among Science Fiction Research Association members behind the nomination for, and presentation of, its Pilgrim Award to Joanna Russ. Bemused, he writes, "When the award was presented, the speaker for the committee said that the committee started with the observation that since the Pilgrim had never been given to a woman, it was time to correct that imbalance. I personally was struck by this comment because I chaired the committee the year that the Pilgrim Award was presented to Samuel R. Delany; we did not begin by observing that the award had never been presented to a black and then set out to redress that situation." Science fiction critic Joan Gordon responds, and remarks inter alia that, in any event, Russ was not the first woman to do so; Marjorie Hope Nicolson had received the very second Pilgrim in 1971. The Award honors outstanding lifetime contributions to SF and fantasy scholarship.) in Science Fiction Studies 17:2 #51 (July 1990) pp. 286–288.
- "The Language and Languages of Science Fiction", in Fictional Space: Essays on Contemporary Science Fiction, ed. Tom Shippey. Oxford, England: Basil Blackwell Ltd.; Atlantic Highlands, NJ: Humanities Press, 1991. pp. 194–211. ISBN 9-780-63117-762-3
- "Usage Glossaries in Current College Handbooks" (Winter 1991), in American Speech Vol. 66, No. 4, pp. 341–358.
- "Usage Items in Current Handbooks of Composition" (1994) in Publication of the American Dialect Society 78 (1): 129–137.
- "Linguistics in Textbooks: A Forty-Year Comparison" (Spring 1995), in American Speech Vol. 70, No. 1, pp. 30–68.
- "Bass, T. J." in St. James Guide to Science Fiction Writers, ed. Jay P. Pederson. 4th ed. Detroit: St. James, 1996. pp. 51–52.
- "Brown, Rosel George" in St. James Guide to Science Fiction Writers, ed. Jay P. Pederson. 4th ed. Detroit: St. James, 1996. pp. 114–115.
- "Haggard, H(enry) Rider" in St. James Guide to Science Fiction Writers, ed. Jay P. Pederson. 4th ed. Detroit: St. James, 1996. pp. 405–407.
- "Moore, Ward" in St. James Guide to Science Fiction Writers, ed. Jay P. Pederson. 4th ed. Detroit: St. James, 1996. pp. 677.
- "Schmitz, James H(enry)" in St. James Guide to Science Fiction Writers, ed. Jay P. Pederson. 4th ed. Detroit: St. James, 1996. p. 814.

=== Book reviews ===
- "Historical Linguistics," review of Introduction to Historical Linguistics (1972) by Anthony Arlotto, in American Speech, Vol. 45, No. 1/2 (Spring-Summer 1970), pp. 115–121.
- "Linguistics and SF", a review of Linguistics and Language in Science Fiction-Fantasy by Myra Edward Barnes, of which Meyers finds occasion to comment that "there is no substitute for expertise in the field one writes about," in Science Fiction Studies #8 = Vol. 3, Part 1 (March 1976)
- Riddley Walker (1982) by Russell Hoban, in Science Fiction & Fantasy Book Review, #3 (April 1982)
- The Ring of Ikribu (1982) by David C. Smith and Richard L. Tierney, in Science Fiction & Fantasy Book Review, #3 (April 1982)
- Demon Night (1982) by David C. Smith and Richard L. Tierney, in Science Fiction & Fantasy Book Review, #7 (September 1982)
- The Lair of Ancient Dreams (1982) by Asa Drake, in Science Fiction & Fantasy Book Review, #7 (September 1982)
- The Night Master (1982) by Robert Sampson, in Science Fiction & Fantasy Book Review, #8 (October 1982)
- Poul Anderson: Myth-Master and Wonder-Weaver: An Interim Bibliography (1983) by Gordon Benson, Jr.; in Science Fiction & Fantasy Book Review, #11 (January–February 1983)
- "Problems with Herbert" - Meyers' essay-reviews of two books concerning Frank Herbert and Dune, by Timothy O'Reilly (1981) and by David M. Miller (1980), in Science-Fiction Studies #29 = Vol. 10, Part 1 (March 1983)
- The Sleeping Dragon (1984) by Joel Rosenberg, in Fantasy Review, ed. Neil Barron, Robert A. Collins (August 1984)
- The Sword and the Chain (1984) by Joel Rosenberg, in Fantasy Review, ed. Neil Barron, Robert A. Collins (September 1984)
- "A Herbert Bibliography", review of Dune Master: A Frank Herbert Bibliography (1988) by Daniel J. H. Levack and Mark Willard, in Science Fiction Studies #51 = Vol. 17, Part 2 (July 1990)
- "Aldiss at Large," review of The Work of Brian W. Aldiss: An Annotated Bibliography & Guide by Margaret Aldiss, in Science Fiction Studies 20: 1 (March 1993) pp. 132–135.
- "The Klingon Language", review of The Grammarian's Desk (1996) by Captain Krankor (i.e. Rich Yampell), in Science Fiction Studies #72 = Vol. 24, Part 2 (July 1997)

== See also ==
- Linguistics in science fiction for an extended discussion of Aliens and Linguists
- Elvish languages of Middle-earth
- Folk linguistics
- List of common misconceptions about language learning
- Perceptual dialectology
- Suzette Haden Elgin
- Applied linguistics
