= Nonpresent tense =

Grammatical tense in some languages

A nonpresent tense (abbreviated NPRS) is a grammatical tense that distinguishes a verbal action as taking place in times past or future, as opposed to present tense.

The constructed language Ithkuil has such a tense (RTI (Relative Timeline Indicator), degree 5, suffix -lt).
