= Martian language (disambiguation) =

Martian language is the nickname of unconventional representation of Chinese characters online.

Martian language may also refer to:

- A hypothetical alien language that dwellers of Mars would use
  - Any of several alien language in science fiction
    - Barsoomian language, the Martian language of Edgar Rice Burroughs
  - Fake "Martian language" fabricated by Hélène Smith
    - Le Langage martien (French: The Martian Language), a 1901 book by Victor Henry about the language of Helene Smith

== See also ==
- Linguistics in science fiction
