= Ithkuil =

Experimental constructed language

- Iţkuil
- Iţkuîl written in the Ithkuil writing systems
- Pronunciation: /ɪθˈkʊ.il/
- Created by: John Quijada
- Date: 1978–2023; 2023–present (as New Ithkuil)
- Users: None
- Purpose: Constructed language: Ithkuil
- Writing system: Morphophonemic

Language codes
- ISO 639-3: None (mis)
- Glottolog: None
- IETF: art-x-ithkuil

Ithkuil is an experimental constructed language created by John Quijada. It is designed to express more profound levels of human cognition briefly yet overtly and clearly, particularly about human categorization. It is a cross between an a priori philosophical and a logical language. It tries to minimize the vagueness and semantic ambiguity found in natural human languages. Ithkuil is notable for its grammatical complexity and extensive phoneme inventory, the latter being simplified in the latest redesign. The name "Ithkuil" is an anglicized form of Iţkuîl, which in the original form roughly meant "hypothetical representation of a language." Quijada states he did not create Ithkuil to be auxiliary or used in everyday conversations. Instead, he wanted the language for more elaborate and profound fields where more insightful thoughts are expected, such as philosophy, arts, science, and politics.

Meaningful phrases or sentences can usually be expressed in Ithkuil with fewer linguistic units than natural languages. For example, the two-word Ithkuil sentence "Tram-mļöi hhâsmařpţuktôx" can be translated into English as "On the contrary, I think it may turn out that this rugged mountain range trails off at some point." Quijada deems his creation as too complex to have developed naturally, seeing it as an exercise in exploring how languages could function. It was featured in the Language Creation Conference's 6th Conlang Relay.

Four versions of the language have been published: the initial version in 2004, a simplified version called Ilaksh in 2007, a third version in 2011, and the current version (as of February 2023), called New Ithkuil. In 2004—and again in 2009 with Ilaksh—Ithkuil was featured in the Russian-language popular science and IT magazine Computerra. In 2008, David J. Peterson awarded it the Smiley Award. In 2013, Bartłomiej Kamiński codified the language to parse complicated sentences quickly. Julien Tavernier and anonymous others have since followed suit. Since July 2015, Quijada has released several Ithkuil songs in a prog-rock style as part of the album Kaduatán, which translates to "Wayfarers." Recently, online communities have developed in English, Russian, Mandarin, and Japanese.

== Etymology ==
Versions of Ithkuil are generally numbered with Roman numerals, e.g. Ithkuil I, Ithkuil II. Despite this, Ithkuil has other names attached to it, either officially named or was named by the Ithkuil-enthusiast community: Ithkuil I version was named as "Iţkuîl" (anglicised: Ithkuil; /ɪθˈkʊ.il/) which became the origin of the name "Ithkuil", Ithkuil II as "ilákš" (anglicised: ilaksh; /iˈlǎkʃ/), Ithkuil III as "Elartkha" or "elartkʰa" (/εˈlârtkʰa/), and Ithkuil IV which is commonly referred to as TNIL or "The New Ithkuilic Language" or also known as "Malëuţřait" by the community.

The names of each version of Ithkuil in their respective writing systems. From top to bottom: "Iţkuîl" in the Ithkuil I writing system, "Ilákš" in the Ithkuil II artistic writing system, and "Iţkuil" (as a proper name, not a native word) in the Ithkuil III and IV writing systems

=== Ithkuil ===
The word iţkuîl was a formative derived from the root k-l (broadly concerning "speech", "voice", or even "interpretation") through the addition of several morphological determinants:

- The -u- vocalic infix

kul was the holistic variety of the Stem 2 of the three other possible stems from k-l. Translating roughly as "a meaningful unit of speech", i.e. "a word", it gave no emphasis on the meaning or the vocal rendering of the word.

- The u → uî mutation of the infix

Secondary mode, as opposed to primary mode, meant that the word kuîl is not to refer to a real-life phenomenon, but rather to a mental representation, or projection, of that phenomenon; to an imaginary or hypothetical object. Thus translating as, "a made-up word".

- A grade 8 mutation of the first radical consonant: k → ţk

The configuration of the term was composite. Roughly corresponding to the plurality concept in Indo-European languages, it also implies the objects in question (words, kuîl) to be diverse, while forming a "coherent emergent entity" (rather than just a collection or an array of different words), thus meaning "a vocabulary" or "lexicon".

- The i- vocalic prefix, one of the 24 possible for formative roots

The extension was delimitive, perceiving "vocabulary" as entire, with clearly distinguished boundaries, as opposed to it being just a local manifestation – such as slang or a dialect – of a broader lexicon (-ţkuîl).
The affiliation of the set of objects in question was coalescent. This indicates that the individual members of the set act together toward a higher purpose by coordinating their complementary functions. Thus, "a vocabulary/lexicon" becomes "a language".

- Syllabic stress on the penultimate syllable (-u-)

The perspective of the noun is monadic, seeing "the language" as a single and specific entity, rather than a collection of many languages existing separately, the general phenomenon ("human languages") or the abstract idea of language.

Thus, the approximate translation of iţkuîl was "an idea/fantasy of a complete purposeful system of complementary speech elements", or simply "an imaginary language".

== History ==
=== John Quijada's youth ===
John Quijada was born around 1959 in Los Angeles, United States to a Mexican-American immigrant couple. He is a native English speaker and can speak French, Spanish, Portuguese, and Italian. He also claims to be able to read in Catalan and Interlingua; however, he cannot converse in these languages.

Quijada's interest in conlanging began when he was introduced to the utopian politics of the Esperanto group as well as some books from a record store near his home. In addition, during the 1970s, he discovered an album by the French band Magma, a progressive rock-genre group band which made songs in Kobaïan, a constructed language they created. He created his first constructed language at the age of 15 he called Mbozo. It was a combination of Romance-Germanic languages with vocabulary and phonology derived from African languages. Later on, he also created the Pskeoj, a language which was generated from "random typing on a typewriter".

John Quijada pursued a linguistics degree at the California State University, Fullerton with the ambition to become an anthropologist in the field of linguistics. However, he was unable to complete his undergraduate studies due to financial problems. He then worked at the Department of Motor Vehicles with the hope of continuing his studies when he had enough money. In the meantime, he continued his studies in linguistics by himself. He "spent hours in the library" reading books on the elements of a language that is fairly exotic compared to many other languages in the world. In addition, Quijada also made annual visits to Cody's Books, a legendary bookstore in Berkeley, California to find new reads. From his reading, Quijada found "unique and exotic" features some languages have and had the desire to unify all of those into one language.

=== Influences ===
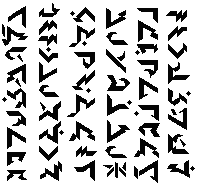
An example of vertical boustrophedonic Ithkuil text (2004). Translation: "As our vehicle leaves the ground and plunges over the edge of the cliff toward the valley floor, I ponder whether it is possible that one might allege I am guilty of an act of moral failure, having failed to maintain a proper course along the roadway." Romanized: Pull̀ uíqišx maʼwałg eřyaufënienˉ päţwïç auxëʼyaļt xneʼwïļtaʼşui tua kit öllá yaqazmuiv liʼyïrzişkaʼ pʼamḿ aìloʼwëčča šuʼyehtaş ˈpʊl꜔꜖.l̩ ʊˈɪ꜔꜖qɪʃx ˈma꜔꜖ʔwaɫɡ ɛʁjaʊfɤˈnɪ˥ɛn ˈpæθ꜔꜖wɯç aʊˈxɤ꜔꜖ʔjaɬt xnɛʔwɯɬˈtaʔ꜔꜖ʂʊɪ ˈtʊ꜔꜖a kɪt꜔꜖ œlːˈa꜔꜖ jaˈqaz꜔꜖mʊɪv lɪʔjɯɾˈzɪʂ꜔꜖kaʔ pʼam.ˈm̩꜔꜖ a.ɪlɔˈwɤ꜔꜖tʃːa ʃʊʔˈjɛh꜔꜖taʂ

Ithkuil evolved over 45 years as a linguistic experiment beyond Western Indo-European languages in response to the Sapir-Whorf hypothesis and Charles J. Fillmore's case grammar into "a complex, intricate array of interwoven grammatical concepts" with "ideas inspired by countless hours studying texts in theoretical linguistics, cognitive grammar, psycholinguistics, language acquisition, linguistic relativity, semantics, semiotics, philosophy, fuzzy set theory, and even quantum physics." Ithkuil was heavily inspired by cognitive linguists including George Lakoff, Ronald Langacker, Gilles Fauconnier, and Len Talmy.

For his influences, Quijada cites the obscure "morphophonology of Abkhaz verb complexes, the moods of verbs of certain American Indian languages, the aspectual system of Niger–Kordofanian languages, the nominal case systems of Basque and Dagestanian languages, the enclitic system of the Wakashan languages, the positional orientation systems of Tzeltal and Guugu Yimithirr, the Semitic triliteral root morphology, and the hearsay and possessive categories of Suzette Elgin's Láadan language". The writing system's logical design borrows principles from Ethiopic and Brahmi scripts, but employs a unique morphophonemic principle. The script used throughout the Ithkuil grammar bears a superficial resemblance to Hebrew square script and the various Klingon fonts. Furthermore, Ilaksh had a "cartouche script" and a cursive format (the former of which had been an upcoming aesthetic project of the designer's).

=== Ilaksh (2007) ===
The initial publication of Ithkuil in 2004 had an extensive phonology of 65 consonants and 17 vowels. After a mention of Ithkuil in the Russian magazine Computerra, several speakers of Russian contacted Quijada and expressed enthusiasm to learn Ithkuil for its application to psychonetics, with several complaining about its difficulty in pronunciation. Quijada remade Ithkuil's morphophonology with 30 consonants and 10 vowels (and the addition of tones) and published the revision on 10 June 2007 as Ilaksh. The language featured other amendments to grammar, including some additional Levels and a change of Cases. It was redesigned to be easier to speak and included an additional writing system. The initial sequential "informal" system suitable for handwriting or compact typesetting, and a "formal" logographic system with artistic possibilities resembling Maya scripts.

In the "informal" writing system, several parallel sets of lines are shaped to correspond sequentially to the different parallel sets of lexemes and inflections. It is directly pronounceable. The author designed it with reserve for convenient handwriting. The overall design would permit compact, clear, black-and-white rendering.

In the colorful "formal" script, a single complex glyph represented an entire sentence. Diversely shaped, shaded and superimposed cartouches represent the syntactic relations of the verb and noun phrases of a sentence. The edges of the cartouches had particular shapes that indicate one set of inflections, the colors indicate another set of inflections, and the textures yet another one. On the cartouches, letters of hexagonal outline would spell out the forms of particular lexemes. The cartouches formed phrases, with primary phrases overlapping subordinate phrases. The coloring system utilized different color densities and texturing for different colors in order to be usable by colorblind people. These density conventions also allowed the formal system to be inexpensively printed in black-and-white, or inscribed or imprinted on stone or other materials.

=== Ithkuil (2011) ===
Ilaksh was superseded by a morphologically similar language also termed Ithkuil because of its ties to the initial publication. The script uses a unique morphophonemic principle that allows sentences representing grammatical categories to be pronounced in multiple ways as the speaker sees fit. It was deemed the final version of the language, which grew attention to conlangers on social media. One blog translates "I am sleepy because those damn cats were fighting all night and I couldn't sleep well!" as ur-rn aičnattîbi tei n-nraiʼdáčnuitîb ti wëqam-msukšš hwaičúitôkçuxh rrolp żüʼâluss.

In 2014 the category of register was introduced and in 2015 a mathematical and measurement-based sublanguage was published. Dozens on the community Reddit forum have proposed revisions to make the language more learnable. Quijada plans to adopt the cartouche script "for use as an alternative, 'ornamental' writing system for artistic purposes" to Ithkuil in a future update of the language.

=== New Ithkuil (2023) ===
Owing to complaints about the difficult patterns in the language morphology, on 30 October 2017 Quijada published a tentative outline for a new version of the language, addressing learners' desires for a more agglutinative morphophonology, including a restructured formative outline, and extended use of adjuncts for shortened expression of the grammar to further create phonaesthetics. Quijada has considered mandating verbal categories expressed in formatives to be redundantly spoken aloud in adjuncts to be more naturalistic. Despite the complexity of the language, intended only as an experiment without concern for the constraints of human learnability, he has published several updates for a new language predicated off the original grammar, most recently in November 2019. The new language is intended to feature an expanded lexicon and writing system that can be handwritten.

In February 2023, Quijada published the fourth iteration of the language, titled New Ithkuil, and announced that the previous version would remain online for archival purposes.

== Outline ==
=== Phonology ===
The phonology consists of 31 consonants and 9 vowels. The consonants are as follows:

		Labial	Dental	Alveolar		Alveolar~Retroflex	Post- alveolar	Palatal	Velar	Uvular	Glottal
		Labial	Dental	median	lateral	Alveolar~Retroflex	Post- alveolar	Palatal	Velar	Uvular	Glottal
Nasal		m (m̥) hm	n̪ n (n̪̥) hn						ŋ ň/ņ		
Stop/ Affricate	voiced	b	d̪ d	d͡z ẓ			d͡ʒ j		ɡ		
Stop/ Affricate	voiceless	p	t̪ t	t͡s c			t͡ʃ č		k		ʔ ʼ
Stop/ Affricate	aspirated	(pʰ) ph	(t̪ʰ) th	(t͡sʰ) ch			(t͡ʃʰ) čh		(kʰ) kh		
Fricative	voiced	v	ð d͕	z			ʒ ž				
Fricative	voiceless	f	θ ţ	s	ɬ l͕		ʃ š	ç	x~χ		h
Trill						(r) rr				(ʀ) řř	
Flap						ɾ~ɽ r (ɾ̥) hr					
Approximant		w			l̪ l	(ɹ) r		j y	(w)	ʁ̞ ř	

The consonants cʼ, čʼ, kʼ, pʼ, q, qʰ, qʼ, tʼ, and xh are eliminated, x is pronounced [x]~[χ], ň will be written n before k, g, or x, and dh is now written ḑ (or optionally đ or ḍ). The clusters with h are disyllabic in word-medial positions, but usually form allophones when found at the beginning of words. For example, word-medially kh would be pronounced [kh] as in the English word "backhanded", but kh is pronounced [kʰ] in the New Ithkuil word "khala". The forms hl, hr, hm, and hn can be pronounced either [ɬ], [ɾ̥], [m̥], and [n̥] respectively, or as consonant sequences. Combinations of a voiced consonant plus following -h- are always disyllabic. r is pronounced as a tap [ɾ], but becomes a trill [r] when geminated. Following another consonant, a non-geminated r may optionally be pronounced as an apico-alveolar-retroflex approximant [ɹ]. When ř is geminated it is either [ʁː] or can be strengthened to a uvular trill [ʀ].

The vowels are as follows:

	Front		Central	Back
	Unrounded	Rounded	Central	Back
Close	i~ɪ i	ʉ~y ü		u~ʊ u
Close-mid	e~ɛ e	ø~œ ö	ə~ʌ ë	o~ɔ o
Open	æ ä		a~ɑ a	

The vowels ê, î, ô, and û are removed from Ithkuil III to allow for easier memorization. The letter ä, pronounced [æ], is introduced. a is pronounced [a]~[ɑ], e is pronounced [e]~[ɛ], i is pronounced [i]~[ɪ], o is pronounced [o]~[ɔ], u is pronounced [u]~[ʊ], ë is pronounced [ə]~[ʌ], ü is pronounced [ʉ]~[y], and ö is pronounced [ø]~[œ]. Rules for external junction between words have been described for speakers to be able to clearly parse word boundaries.

Stress is marked with an acute diacritic on letters without diacritics and the circumflex on letters with a diaeresis. The letters i and u are marked with a grave diacritic when they are unstressed and the first of more than one vowel after a consonant to remind the reader that they are pronounced [iː] and [u] and not [j] nor [w], respectively.

=== Grammar ===
The grammar is largely the same as in Ithkuil III, but with a greater focus on the scope of grammatical categories to be more logical. Stem pattern has been replaced by stem specification, and Suffixes were renamed Affixes. The categories of Designation, Sanction, and Modality have been supplanted by affixual forms. Possessive cases are named Appositive; Associative cases split into Associative, Adverbial, Relational, and Affinitive; and Comparative cases are eliminated. The Ca complex is modular and various categories follow a 9-valued vowel sequence. Incorporated roots have been replaced by a system of concatenation. Formatives and personal reference categories now have the option to carry Effect, a category prescribing beneficial, detrimental, or neutral states to a referent.

=== Lexicon ===
The lexicon includes over 6000 roots and around 520 affixes.

=== Writing system ===
An example of Ithkuil's script meaning "Be careful; your fork is actually a fennec."

Handwritten form of the above text.

Ithkuil's writing system is unique to the language and is not similar to any natural writing systems. The writing system is morpho-phonetic, meaning two types of graphemes are used: one to represent different grammatical concepts, such as case, number etc. and the other to represent roots and affixes. John Quijada provides an example, saying that an example of word in a morpho-phonemic writing system would be gø (pronounced went), where the root would be "go" and past tense would be indicated by diagonal bar through the vowel.

== Possible advantages ==
The Sapir–Whorf hypothesis postulates that a person's language influences their perceptions and cognitive patterns. Stanislav Kozlovsky speculated in the Russian popular-scientific magazine Computerra that a fluent speaker of Ithkuil, accordingly, would think "about five or six times as fast" as a speaker of a typical natural language. The Sapir–Whorf hypothesis would suggest that, Ithkuil being an extremely precise and synthetic language, its speakers would have a more discerning, deeper understanding both of everyday situations and of broader phenomena, and of abstract philosophical categories.

However, strong forms of the hypothesis, which postulate that language determines thought and not only influences it, have been rejected by mainstream linguistics. Moreover, in line with this, Quijada has stated he does not believe a speaker would think necessarily any faster because even though Ithkuil is terse, a single word requires a lot more thought before it can be spoken than it would in a natural language.

Kozlovsky also likened Ithkuil to the fictional Speedtalk from Robert A. Heinlein's novella Gulf, and contrasted both languages with the Newspeak of the communicationally restricted society of Orwell's Nineteen Eighty-Four. Ithkuil is by far the most complete language of the three, as the lexicon and grammar are described in far greater detail. John Quijada acknowledged the similarity of Ithkuil's design goals to those of Speedtalk, remarking that,

[h]owever, Heinlein's Speedtalk appears to focus only on the morpho-phonological component of language[, whereas] Ithkuil has been designed with an equal focus on [morphology, lexico-morphology, or lexico-semantics]. Additionally, the apparent purpose of Heinlein's language is simple rapidity/brevity of speech and thought, while Ithkuil is focused on maximal communication in the most efficient manner, a somewhat different purpose, in which brevity per se is irrelevant.

== Past versions ==
=== Ithkuil (2004) ===
The original version of Ithkuil had a significantly more complicated morphophonology.

==== Phonology ====
At the left of each cell in the table below is the phoneme, and at the right its transliterated representation. The original 65 consonants were as follows:

		Labial	Dental	Alveolar		Retroflex	Post- alveolar	Palatal	Velar	Uvular	Pharyngeal	Glottal
		Labial	Dental	median	lateral	Retroflex	Post- alveolar	Palatal	Velar	Uvular	Pharyngeal	Glottal
Nasal		m	n̪ n						ŋ ņ			
Plosive	voiced	b	d̪ d					ɟ ǰ	ɡ	ɢ ġ		
Plosive	voiceless	p	t̪ t					c ķ	k	q		ʔ ʼ
Plosive	aspirated	pʰ	t̪ʰ tʰ					cʰ ķʰ	kʰ	qʰ		
Plosive	ejective	pʼ	t̪ʼ tʼ					cʼ ķʼ	kʼ	qʼ		
Affricate	voiced			d͡z ƶ		ɖ͡ʐ ż	d͡ʒ j					
Affricate	voiceless			t͡s c		ʈ͡ʂ ċ	t͡ʃ č					
Affricate	aspirated			t͡sʰ cʰ	cʎ̥˔ʰ q̌	ʈ͡ʂʰ ċʰ	t͡ʃʰ čʰ					
Affricate	ejective			t͡sʼ cʼ		ʈ͡ʂʼ ċʼ	t͡ʃʼ čʼ	c͡çʼ çʼ	k͡xʼ xʼ	q͡χʼ x̧ʼ		
Fricative	voiced	v	ð ḑ	z		ʐ z̧	ʒ ž	ʝ y̌	ɣ ǧ			
Fricative	voiceless	f	θ ţ	s	ɬ ļ	ʂ ş	ʃ š	ç	x	χ x̧	ħ ḩ	h
Liquid	flap					ɽ r						
Liquid	non-flap				l̪ l	ɻ ŗ						
Approximant		w			ɫ̪ ł			j y		ʁ̞ ř		

/w ɫ̪/ were velarized and /m n̪ ŋ l ɫ ɻ/ could be syllabic. h was [ɸ] when preceded by a vowel and followed by another consonant. [cʎ̥˔ʰ] was in free variation with [cʎ̥˔ʼ], the latter being more common at the beginning of a word (both spelled q̌). All consonants except y and w could be geminated; when geminated, h was a bidental fricative ([h̪͆]) and r was an alveolar trill ([r]).

At the left of each cell in the table below is the phoneme, and at the right its transliterated representation. The original 17 vowels are as follows:

	Front	Central	Back
Close	i î y ÿ	ʉ ü	ɯ ï u û
Near-close	ɪ i		ʊ u
Close-mid	e ê ø		ɤ ë o ô
Open-mid	ɛ e œ ö		ɔ o
Open	æ ä	a	ɑ â

The diphthongs were /ai̯/, /æi̯/, /ei̯/, /ɤi̯/, /øi̯/, /oi̯/, /ʊi̯/, /au̯/, /æu̯/, /eu̯/, /ɤu̯/, /ɪu̯/, /ou̯/, /øu̯/, /aɯ̯/, /eɯ̯/, /ɤɯ̯/, /ʊɯ̯/, /oɯ̯/, /ɪɯ̯/, /æɯ̯/, /øɯ̯/, /ʉɯ̯/, /ae̯/. All other sequences of vowels were pronounced as separate syllables.

There were four tones: falling, high, broken (falling-rising), and rising.

==== Grammar ====
The lexicon of the original Ithkuil consisted of the same patterns as the 2011 form of the language. However, each root consisted of two consonantal radicals, and could derive thousands of lexemes through the use of Ithkuil's complex rules of morphophonology, which involved both consonantal and vocal mutation, shifts in syllabic stress and tone, and affixation.

Ithkuil words can be divided into just two parts of speech, formatives and adjuncts. Formatives functioned both as nouns and as verbs, depending on the morphosemantic context. Formatives were inflected for the current grammatical categories, plus 2 foci, and 81 cases; they could also have taken on some of the 153 affixes, which further qualified into one of 9 degrees. Verbal formatives were additionally inflected for 7 conflations.

Verbal adjuncts similarly worked in conjunction with adjacent formatives to provide additional grammatical information. Two types of verbal adjuncts were inflected to indicate 14 valencies, 6 versions, 8 formats, 37 derivations, 30 modalities, 4 levels, 9 validations, 9 phases, 9 sanctions, 32 aspects, 8 moods, and 24 biases.

=== Ilaksh (2007) ===
In an effort to make the language more speakable, Quijada created a revision called Ilaksh that relied on tone to reduce the phonemic inventory.

The phonological system of Ilaksh was revised to consist of only 30 consonants and 10 vowels. The consonants are the same as those of Ithkuil IV with the omission of the voiceless alveolar lateral fricative ɬ. /m n̪ ŋ l ɽ/ could be syllabic. All consonants except /j w ʔ/ could be geminated; when geminated, h was a bidental fricative or a voiceless pharyngeal fricative, and ɽ was an alveolar trill. The clusters /n̪j/, /tj/, /dj/, and /lj/ could be pronounced as such or as the palatals [ɲ], [c], [ɟ], and [ʎ]. The orthography used ⟨đ ŧ ż⟩ instead of ⟨ḑ ţ ẓ⟩.

The vowels were the same as those of Ithkuil IV, but with an additional vowel pronounced as /ɨ/ or /ɯ/. The 14 diphthongs of Ilaksh were /ai̯/, /æi̯/, /ei̯/, /əi̯/, /oi̯/, /øi̯/, /ui̯/, /au̯/, /æu̯/, /eu̯/, /əu̯/, /iu̯/, /ou̯/, and /øu̯/. All other sequences of vowels were pronounced as separate syllables.

There were six tones: low, high, falling, rising, falling-rising, and rising-falling.

=== Ithkuil (2011) ===
==== Phonology ====
Ithkuil has 45 consonants and 13 vowels. At the left of each cell in the table below is the phoneme, and at the right its transliterated representation if it is not written the same in IPA as in romanized Ithkuil. The consonants are as follows:

		Labial	Dental	Alveolar		Retroflex	Post- alveolar	Palatal	Velar	Uvular	Glottal
		Labial	Dental	median	lateral	Retroflex	Post- alveolar	Palatal	Velar	Uvular	Glottal
Nasal		m	n̪ n						ŋ ň		
Plosive/ Affricate	voiced	b	d̪ d	d͡z ż			d͡ʒ j		ɡ		
Plosive/ Affricate	voiceless	p	t̪ t	t͡s c			t͡ʃ č		k	q	ʔ ʼ
Plosive/ Affricate	aspirated	pʰ	t̪ʰ tʰ	t͡sʰ cʰ			t͡ʃʰ čʰ		kʰ	qʰ	
Plosive/ Affricate	ejective	pʼ	t̪ʼ tʼ	t͡sʼ cʼ			t͡ʃʼ čʼ		kʼ	qʼ	
Fricative	voiced	v	ð dh	z			ʒ ž				
Fricative	voiceless	f	θ ţ	s	ɬ ļ		ʃ š	ç	x	χ xh	h
Flap						ɽ r					
Approximant					l			j y	w	ʁ̞ ř	

/m n̪ ŋ l ɽ/ can be syllabic. All consonants except /j w ʔ/ can be geminated; when geminated, /h/ is a bidental fricative or a voiceless pharyngeal fricative ([ħ]), and /ɽ/ is an alveolar trill.

The 13 vowels of Ithkuil are as follows:

	Front	Central	Back
Close	iː î	ʉ~y ü	uː û
Near-close	ɪ i		ʊ u
Close-mid	eː ê		oː ô
Mid	œ~ø ö	ə <ë>	
Open-mid	ɛ e		ɔ o
Open		ä a	ɑ â

/ɪ ʊ/ are pronounced as /i u/ when they precede another vowel, and at the end of a word. /ɛ ɔ/ are pronounced /e o/ when they precede another vowel, except /ɪ ʊ/.

The diphthongs in Ithkuil are /äɪ̯/, /ɛɪ̯/, /əɪ̯/, /ɔɪ̯/, /ø̞ɪ̯/, /ʊɪ̯/, /äʊ̯/, /ɛʊ̯/, /əʊ̯/, /ɪʊ̯/, /ɔʊ̯/, /ø̞ʊ̯/. All other sequences of vowels are pronounced as separate syllables. The grave accent is used to indicate the vowel sequence is not a diphthong. The grave and acute accents are used for stress: the acute marks stress if possible, and the grave is used to indicate another vowel has stress when that vowel already has a diacritic, and thus cannot take an acute.

==== Morphophonology ====
Ithkuil words can be divided into just two parts of speech, Formatives and Adjuncts. Formatives can function both as nouns and as verbs, derived from the root and depending on the morphosemantic context. They can be expanded through various "suffixes". Adjuncts serve two roles, either indicating personal referents like pronouns, or specifying additional verbal information such as grammatical bias. In a future version of the language, adjuncts will be able to convey suffix (or rather, affix) information.

==== Formatives ====
Roots are Ithkuil's most basic semantic units. All Ithkuil formatives are derived from a limited number of roots. Each root consists of a cluster of 1–4 consonants (five-consonant clusters are also available, but remain without an assigned meaning). The current lexicon of Ithkuil can potentially consist of approximately 3600 word roots, just over 1000 of which have been assigned definitions. From the root, word stems are formed by affixing the vocalic affix that indicates stem pattern, stem type, function for the stem, and by stressing a particular syllable to indicate informal or formal designation.

There are three stems associated with each root. Each stem comes in three patterns, one holistic and two complementary ones. Holistic stem 1 typically refers to the most general manifestation of a root, whereas holistic stems 2 and 3 typically refer to more specific manifestations associated with the root. Each holistic stem has two complementary stems associated with it, which refer to the complementary concepts related to the holistic stem. The specific meaning of complementary stems depends somewhat on the root. These are derived from the word roots by prefixing a vowel or diphthong that also indicates the grammatical category function. Two examples are given in the tables below:

Holistic stem 1		Holistic stem 2		Holistic stem 3	
nuclear family member (a)mm-		male nuclear family member emm-		female nuclear family member umm-	
Complementary stems		Complementary stems		Complementary stems	
parent omm-	child âmm-	father ömm-	son êmm-	mother îmm-/ûmm	daughter ômm-

Holistic stem 1		Holistic stem 2		Holistic stem 3	
higher-order animal lifeform (a)q-		human being eq-		non-human higher-order animal lifeform uq-	
Complementary stems		Complementary stems		Complementary stems	
male higher-order animal lifeform oq-	female higher-order animal lifeform âq-	male human being öq-	female human being êq-	male non-human higher-order animal lifeform îq- / ûq-	female non-human higher-order animal lifeform ôq-

===== Basic morphology =====
All Ithkuil formatives, whether functioning as nouns or verbs, inflect for various grammatical categories that are quite dissimilar from any of those in natural languages. Quantization is more or less covered by the grammatical categories of Configuration, Affiliation, and Perspective, even though these do not technically refer to number per se.

====== Configuration ======
The nine configurations (Uniplex, Duplex, Discrete, Aggregative, Segmentative, Componential, Coherent, Composite, Multiform) describe the physical similarity and relationship between the members of a set, e.g. trees may occur in a collection of the same species, of different species, or even in a patternless collection with plants that are not trees.

====== Affiliation ======
The four affiliations (Consolidative, Associative, Variative, Coalescent) describe the subjective purpose or function of members of a set, e.g. a group of trees may occur naturally and have no purpose, they may have the same purpose, complementary purposes, or different purposes.

====== Perspective ======
The four perspectives (Monadic, Unbounded, Nomic, Abstract) describe the boundedness of a set, i.e. if it is viewed as a single unit, multiple disconnected units, viewed generically, or its characteristics considered abstractly.

====== Extension ======
The six extensions (Delimitive, Proximal, Inceptive, Terminative, Graduative, Depletive) describe the referred part of a set, e.g. its beginning or its end.

====== Essence ======
The two essences (Normal, Representative) describe whether the referred set is in the real world or exists solely psychologically.

====== Context ======
The four contexts (Existential, Functional, Representational, Amalgamate) describe the psychological relevance of the set, e.g. merely its existence or the set as symbolic for something else.

====== Designation ======
The two designations (Informal, Formal) describe the authority or permanence of a set.

====== Version ======
The six versions (Processual, Completive, Ineffectual, Incompletive, Positive, Effective) describe whether the action is goal-oriented or not, and whether the action is successfully completed.

====== Register ======
The five registers (Narrative, Discursive, Parenthetical, Cogitant, Impressionistic) describe the mode of personal communication (narration, personal cogitation, subjective impression, direct speech, parenthetical “aside”).

===== Cases =====
There are 96 grammatical cases in Ithkuil, one special case being the vocative, used for direct address. Verbal formatives inflect for case under Frame constructions (i.e., dependent clauses). The grammatical cases of Ithkuil can be divided into several distinct groups:

Category	Identifies	Amount
Transrelative	the participants to the verb	11
Possessive	possessive relationships between nouns	7
Associative	non-possessive relationships between nouns and adverbial relationships with verbs	32
Temporal	temporal relationships	15
Spatial	spatial relationships; this does not cover spatial relationships such as 'to be inside of', which are covered by separate formatives	6
Comparison	comparisons to other nouns, used in conjunction with Level	24

===== Verbal morphology =====
Several distinct grammatical categories apply only to verbal formatives. These are listed below:

====== Function ======
The four functions describe the general relationship that the verbal formative has with its nominal participants (state, action, description). Ithkuil nominal formatives also carry a function, but cannot be inflected for them, always remaining in the "stative".

====== Mood ======
The eight moods describe attitudes or perspectives on the act or the degree of factuality.

====== Illocution ======
The six illocutions describe the general purpose of the speech act (assertion, question, warning, demand, etc.).

====== Relation ======
The two relations describe whether the verbal formative is part of a subordinate clause.

====== Phase ======
The nine phases describe the temporal pattern of the act or occurrence.

====== Sanction ======
The nine sanctions describe the sort of truthfulness the listener should ascribe to it (assertion, allegation, counterargument, refutation, etc.).

====== Valence ======
The fourteen valences describe the manner of participation of 2 separate entities to the verbal formative.

====== Validation ======
The six validations describe the evidence supporting the statement.

====== Aspect ======
The 32 aspects describe the temporal relationship of the verbal formative in its context.

====== Bias ======
The 24 biases describe the speaker's emotional attitude towards the action.

==== Suffixes ====
Ithkuil uses a variety of affixes, termed suffixes, to further delineate what is described by the formative. They come in three types and often correlate with adverbs.

==== Adjuncts ====
There are two types of adjuncts in Ithkuil: personal-reference adjuncts and verbal adjuncts. All adjuncts are highly synthetic.

Personal reference adjuncts are akin to pronouns in English. There are two types of personal-reference adjuncts in Ithkuil: Single-referent and dual-referent.

Verbal adjuncts are adjuncts that work in conjunction with verbal formatives to provide information about the latter's Valence, Level, Phase, Sanction, Illocution, Modality, Aspect, and Bias. Of these, Modality and Level can only be indicated using verbal adjuncts, whereas the others can also be expressed on the verbal formative.

==== Numerical system ====
Ithkuil uses a base 100 numeral system with roots for the numbers 1 to 10, and a stem-specific derivative suffix used with a number root to add a multiple of 10, providing the numerals up to 99. Ithkuil did not originally use the concept of zero. Numbers greater than 100 are expressed through multiple formatives, and a special numerical script has logograms for the numbers 1 to 100 and exponential powers of 100. On 27 March 2015, Quijada released a mathematical sublanguage using a dozenal number system which uses the circle constant tau.

== Writing system ==
"Tram-mļöi hhâsmařpţuktôx" written in the Ithkuil script. English translation: "On the contrary, I think it may turn out that this rugged mountain range trails off at some point"

Ithkuil uses a morphophonemic script because characters convey both phonetic and morphological information. (Notably, it has no alphabet as such.) Its use is closely tied to Ithkuil's grammatical system, which allows much of the phonological aspect of words to be morpho-syntactically inferred. Those parts of an Ithkuil word whose pronunciation is predictable are not written, whereas the characters used to indicate the pronunciation of the unpredictable parts of a word also convey the grammatical information necessary to reconstruct the implicit phonetics. Words are thus written in a highly abbreviated manner, particularly useful for the highly inflected, occasionally elongated words of the Ithkuil language. The script is also used alphabetically for transliterating foreign words and mathematical expressions.

=== Ithkuil II (2007) ===
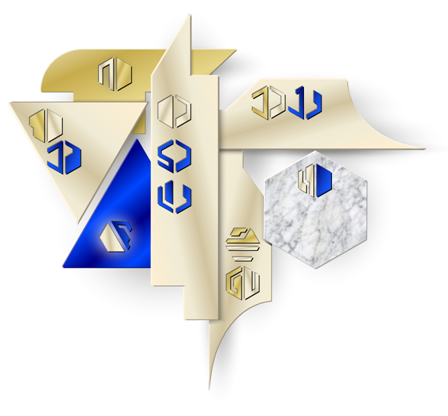
Illustration of an alternative artistic writing system for the Ilaksh language. The glyph in this image reads: "En-nà ççwačotëērbïkç ukšëěuh çéitëpš äireiʼwuŧ aʼläçewöóřzah žie." (English: If only the troupe of clowns had gotten together and destroyed their musical instruments just after performing that lovely recital for us.) The top image shows the colored version of the initial cartouche coloring system design: white, gray, shaded or striped, and black.

The revision of the obsolete Ithkuil language, Ilaksh, was originally going to be written using an experimental writing system in the form of a colored cartouche-like face with a hexagon glyph used as an abstract morphological "map" for Ilaksh sentences. Although the Ilaksh writing system holds the same morpho-phonological principles as its sister languages, it is the most distinctive because it has minimal phonological information, making it an almost pure morpholography writing system. Although the Ilaksh language eventually became obsolete and was discarded, this writing system was still wanted to be adapted into Ithkuil by its creators to be used as an alternative artistic writing system. In addition, Ilaksh also has a secondary writing system in the form of cursive (e.g. handwriting form) which is derived from the main writing system itself. This cursive system is usually written in a top-down direction. There is also a variant with a horizontal direction which is usually used to write short sentences or couplets that can be written in one line only.

==== Cartouche-like face ====
Ilaksh word roots are symbolized by cartouche shapes which will be the foundation of the glyph-like symbol placed above them. In addition, the type of the root can also be determined from the color and shape of the side of the cartouche itself. The formative of the root is determined by the direction of the cartouche itself (e.g., when a root is written using a horizontal direction, it has a nominal formative).

There are 30 sisian shapes used in the cartouche-cartouche with the shoot direction facing left (upper table) and right (lower table). The left-facing shoot is considered the "default" shape for each side.

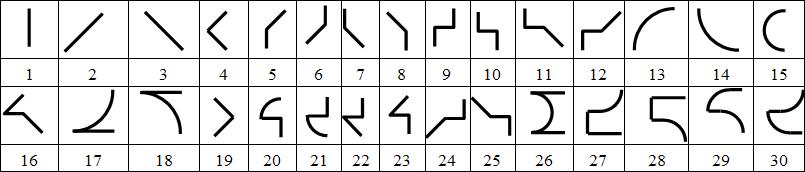
Cartouche with left-facing edge
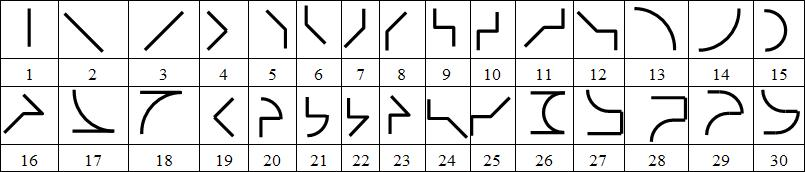
Cartouche with right-facing edge

The cartouche in the Ilaksh writing system consists of four different colors (black, white, gray, shaded or striped) and each of them contains 30 side shapes. There are total of 120 glyph combination available, denoting C_{R} consonantal structure. The 30 form of edge derived from the combination of 5 V_{R} vowel phoneme and 6 tone. To distinguish between the phonological elements represented by the sisian shapes, consonantal elements have left-facing (or top) tops, while vowel and tone elements have right-facing (or bottom) tops.

List of 120 C_{R} consonantal combination
Edge Color	1	2	3	4	5	6	7	8	9	10	11	12	13	14	15	16	17	18	19	20	21	22	23	24	25	26	27	28	29	30
White	p	t	k	b	d	g	f	ŧ	x	v	đ	s	š	z	ž	m	n	ň	r	l	c	č	ż	j	py	ty	ky	by	dy	gy
Gray	fy	ŧy	vy	đy	my	ny	ry	ly	ř	çp	pf	tf	kf	bv	dv	gv	ps	pš	ks	kš	bz	bž	gz	gž	sf	šf	sŧ	šŧ	pŧ	kŧ
Shaded	pl	tl	kl	bl	dl	gl	fl	ŧl	xl	vl	đl	sl	šl	zl	žl	ml	nl	sx	šx	çt	pr	tr	kr	br	dr	gr	fr	ŧr	xr	vr
Black	đr	sr	šr	zr	žr	mr	nr	pm	pn	çk	sp	st	sk	šp	št	šk	sm	šm	sn	šn	př	tř	kř	bř	dř	gř	tm	tn	km	kn

Combination of V_{R} – tone
Tone V_{R}	Low	High	Falling	Rising	Fall-rising	Rise-falling
a	1	6	11	16	21	26
e	2	7	12	17	22	27
i	3	8	13	18	23	28
o	4	9	14	19	24	29
u	5	10	15	20	25	30

===== Case function =====
The basic shape (hexagon) of the glyph undergoes a shape change when it represents a grammatical case of Ilaksh. The forms are divided into 96 modified forms that represent 96 grammatical cases in the morphological structure of Ilaksh, so that one form represents only one grammatical case. Case modification only occurs on the left half of the first glyph in a cartouche face. The following are the 96 left hemisphere modified forms of the first glyph in the cartouche. The number written above each glyph is the description of the case element it represents.

Label	Glyph	Case
OBL	1	Oblique
IND	2	Indusive
ABS	3	Absolutive
ERG	4	Ergative
EFF	5	Effectuative
AFF	6	Affective
DAT	7	Dative
INS	8	Instrumental
ACT	9	Active
DER	10	Derivative
SIT	11	Situative
POS	12	Possessive
PRP	13	Proprietive
GEN	14	Genitive
ATT	15	Atributive
PDC	16	Productive
ITP	17	Interpretive
OGN	18	Originative
PAR	19	Partitive
CRS	20	Contrastive
CPS	21	Compositive
PRD	22	Predicative
MED	23	Mediative
APL	24	Applicative

Label	Glyph	Case
PUR	25	Purposive
CSD	26	Considerative
ESS	27	Essive
ASI	28	Assimilative
FUN	29	Functive
TFM	30	Transformative
REF	31	Referential
CLA	32	Classificative
CNV	33	Conductive
IDP	34	Interdependent
BEN	35	Benefactive
TSP	36	Transpositive
CMM	37	Commutative
COM	38	Commitative
CNJ	39	Conjunctive
UTL	40	Utilitative
ABE	41	Abesive
CVS	42	Conversive
COR	43	Correlative
DEP	44	Dependent
PVS	45	Provisional
PTL	46	Postulative
DFR	47	Deferential
CON	48	Concecive

Label	Glyph	Case
EXC	49	Exceptive
AVR	50	Aversive
CMP	51	Comparative
SML	52	Simultanitive
ASS	53	Assesive
CNR	54	Concursive
ACS	55	Accessive
DFF	56	Diffusive
PER	57	Periodical
PRO	58	Prolapsive
PCV	59	Precursive
PCR	60	Postcursive
ELP	61	Elapsive
ALP	62	Alapsive
INP	63	Interpolative
EPS	64	Episodic
PRL	65	Prolimitive
LIM	66	Limitative
LOC	67	Locative
ORI	68	Orientative
PSV	69	Procursive
ALL	70	Alatid
ABL	71	Ablative
NAV	72	Navigative

Label	Case	Glyph
CMP1A	Comparative 1A	73
CMP2A	Comparative 2A	74
CMP3A	Comparative 3A	75
CMP4A	Comparative 4A	76
CMP5A	Comparative 5A	77
CMP6A	Comparative 6A	78
CMP7A	Comparative 7A	79
CMP8A	Comparative 8A	80
CMP1B	Comparative 1B	81
CMP2B	Comparative 2B	82
CMP3b	Comparative 3B	83
CMP4B	Comparative 4B	84
CMP5B	Comparative 5B	85
CMP6B	Comparative 6B	86
CMP7B	Comparative 7B	87
CMP8B	Comparative 8B	88
CMP1C	Comparative 1C	89
CMP2C	Comparative 2C	90
CMP3C	Comparative 3C	91
CMP4C	Comparative 4C	92
CMP5C	Comparative 5C	93
CMP6C	Comparative 6C	94
CMP7C	Comparative 7C	95
CMP8C	Comparative 8C	96
