= John Krueger =

American academic (1927–2018)

John Richard Krueger (March 14, 1927 – February 7, 2018) was a professor at Indiana University, specialized in studies of Chuvash and Yakut, and Mongolian languages. His approximately 20 books are the standard works, each held in about one hundred United States research libraries. One of his most important contributions is that he translated numerous non-English sources and books into English, such as György Kara's Books of the Mongolian nomads : more than eight centuries of writing Mongolian.

== Biography ==
John Richard Krueger was born on March 14, 1927, in Fremont, Nebraska, to Edward and Winifred Krueger. In 1940, his family moved to Washington, D.C., where Krueger developed an interest in languages. He attended George Washington University where he received a Bachelor of Arts in German. Krueger worked in various federal agencies. In the early 1950s, he received a Fulbright Program scholarship and went to Copenhagen. While in Copenhagen, he studied Mongolian for the first time and fell in love with the language. After completing his Fulbright, Krueger enrolled at the University of Washington where he received his PhD in Mongolian in 1960. While completing his PhD, he taught German at the University of Washington and at Reed College. Krueger met his wife Constance Peek while at the University of Washington. The couple married on March 22, 1957, and divorced twenty-three years later. They had two children together, Curtis and Catherine. After receiving his PhD, Krueger briefly taught Asian Languages at the University of California, Berkeley. In 1962, he joined the Department of Uralic and Altaic Studies at Indiana University. Krueger taught Turkic and Mongolian languages at IU until his retirement in 1985. He was an active writer, editor, and translator of works in Central Asian languages. During his career, Krueger published dozens of articles, linguistic studies, and reviews. He contributed to major dictionaries in Mongolian languages and also provided subject articles to a variety of encyclopedias. Krueger continued to do editorial work long into his retirement. He was an active member of the Mongolia Society throughout his life. Krueger died on February 7, 2018, in Clearwater, Florida, at the age of 90.

== Selected publications ==
- Books of the Mongolian nomads : more than eight centuries of writing Mongolian by György Kara & Translated by John Richard Krueger. Bloomington, IN : Indiana University, Research Institute for Inner Asian Studies, 2005. ISBN 0-933070-52-7
- "The Turkic peoples; selected Russian entries from the Great Soviet Encyclopedia," transl. & ed. by John Richard Krueger. Bloomington, Indiana University, 1963. OCLC: 1090886 .
- Mongolian epigraphical dictionary in reverse listing, by John Richard Krueger. Bloomington, Indiana University [1967] OCLC: 1920922
- The Uralic and Altaic series: an analytical index, including a complete index to Keleti szemle by John Richard Krueger Bloomington, Indiana University [1970]
- Chuvash Manual: introduction, grammar, reader and vocabulary. by John Richard Krueger. Bloomington, Indiana University, 1961. by John Krueger Indiana University Publications, 1961 OCLC: 4063591
- Yakut Manual: Area Handbook, Grammar, Graded Reader and Glossary JR Krueger - 1962 - Indiana University
- Tuvan manual. JR Krueger - 1977 - Indiana Univ.
- The Structure of the Turkic Languages Indiana University publications. Uralic & Altaic series. K Grønbech, JR Krueger - 1979.
- Brief remarks on the grammar of the Finnish language by D E Milanova & John R Krueger. New York : Dolphin Service, 1952
- An introduction to classical (literary) Mongolian : introd., grammar, reader, glossary by Kaare Grønbech & John Richard Krueger. Wiesbaden : Harrassowitz, 1955.
