= List of common misconceptions about language learning =

Common misunderstandings about the process of learning language

Language learning is subject to several misconceptions. It is common for people to rely on their own intuitions about language learning, though they would not do so with other technical subjects such as physics (a phenomenon known as folk linguistics). However, these intuitions are often contradicted by scientific research. Each entry on this list of misconceptions is worded as a correction; the misconceptions themselves are implied rather than stated.

== Childhood language acquisition ==
=== Children do not learn their first language effortlessly ===
Learning a first language is not rapid for children. Children spend years learning their mother tongue, and the process continues well into their school years. At seven years old, for example, many children have difficulties creating passive-voice sentences.

A study on child L1 learners and adult L2 learners of Spanish showed that children do not acquire their first language any more quickly than adults do their second language; conversely, the study suggests that the experience of older learners helps them acquire a better handle on the language in question.

== Second-language acquisition ==
=== Younger learners do not learn languages more easily than older learners ===
It is often assumed that young children learn languages more easily than adolescents and adults. However, the reverse is true; older learners are faster. For example, a study of 17,000 British students showed that those who started learning French aged 11 performed better than those who started learning it aged 8. The only exception to this rule is in pronunciation. Young children invariably learn to speak their second language with native-like pronunciation, whereas learners who start learning a language at an older age only rarely reach a native-like level. The pronunciation seems to be anchored in the speaker from an early age and therefore difficult to change.

=== Intelligence is not strongly correlated with language-learning ability ===
General intelligence is actually often a poor indicator of language-learning ability. Motivation, tolerance for ambiguity, and self-esteem are all better indicators of language-learning success.

=== Immersion is not always the best way to learn a language ===
The ability for learners to develop their language skills depends to a large extent on the type of language input that they receive. For input to be effective for second-language acquisition, it must be comprehensible. Merely being immersed in a second-language environment is no guarantee of receiving comprehensible input. For example, learners living in a country where their second language is spoken may be lucky enough to interact with native speakers who can alter their speech to make it comprehensible; but equally, many learners will not have that same luck, and may not understand the vast majority of the input that they receive.

In addition, adult learners living in a foreign country may not have very high linguistic demands placed on them, for example if they are a low-level employee at a company. Without the incentive to develop high-level skills in their second language, learners may undergo language fossilisation, or a plateau in their language level.

Classroom instruction can be useful in both providing appropriate input for second-language learners, and for helping them overcome problems of fossilisation.

Research on bilingual education programs such as Structured English Immersion classes showed that students in these classes acquire skills equivalent to those of children in English-only programs. Those results suggest that a full immersion is not necessarily more advantageous than a partial immersion.

=== Grammar study is not entirely detrimental to second-language acquisition ===
The study of grammar is helpful for second-language learners, and a lack of grammar knowledge can slow down the language-learning process. On the other hand, relying on grammar instruction as the primary means of learning the language is also detrimental. A balance between these two extremes is necessary for optimal language learning.

=== Not every child learns a second language in the same way ===
Not all learning methods are successful for all children. A more sociable child learns to speak the second language more quickly so that they can be like their peers, without worrying about potential mistakes and the limits of their language resources. The shyer student learns by listening and observing what is going on around them. Research shows that both types of students succeed better depending on the context; the socially active student excels in groupwork, while the "active listener" excels in teacher-oriented activities. This suggests that no learning strategy is ideal for all students, as is also suggested by experiments involving young L1 learners and adult L2 learners of the same language.

Children's behavior in the classroom also varies across cultures; a child accustomed to learning with peers will pay more attention to their classmates than to the teacher.

Social class differences also come into play: children from technologically advanced urban backgrounds are more exposed to academic language than children from rural and technologically less advanced backgrounds.

== Bilingual education ==
=== Learning a second language does not hinder the development of the first language ===
Learners can learn two or more languages without their first language development being adversely affected. There is no such thing as a "fixed amount of space" for languages in the brain. In reality, learners' first languages and their additional languages become part of an integrated system.

=== Once a child can speak a language, the language-learning process is not complete ===
Learning to speak a language conversationally is only part of the way towards becoming fluent in it. Just because a child can speak a language does not mean that they are yet capable of writing and understanding academic language. This kind of language is particularly important in school in the later grades. One study of 1,200 Canadian schoolchildren indicated that it may take between five and seven years longer to master academic language than to master conversational language.

== See also ==
- List of common misconceptions

== Bibliography ==
- Cain, Jacquelin; Weber-Olsen, Marcia; Smith, Rosslyn (1987). "Acquisition strategies in a first and second language: are they the same ?". Journal of Child Language. 14 (2). Cambridge University Press: 333–352. doi:10.1017/S0305000900012964. PMID 3611246. S2CID 35643678.
- Dicker, Susan J. (2003). "Common Misconceptions About Language Learning". Languages in America: A Pluralist View. Multilingual Matters. pp. 82–114. ISBN 978-1-85359-651-3.
- Johnson, David (2008). How Myths about Language Affect Education: What Every Teacher Should Know. University of Michigan Press. ISBN 978-0-472-03287-7.
- Matthews, Michael S. (2006). Working with Gifted English Language Learners. Prufrock Press. ISBN 978-1-59363-195-6.
- McLaughlin, Barry (1992). "Myths and Misconceptions About Second Language Learning: What Every Teacher Needs to Unlearn" (PDF). Educational Practice Report. 5. Santa Cruz: University of California. Archived from the original (PDF) on 17 September 2012.
