= Speedtalk =

Fictional language conceptualized by Robert A. Heinlein

Speedtalk is a fictional constructed language and key plot device in Robert A. Heinlein's novella Gulf (1949). Speedtalk is a logic-based language with complex syntax, minimal vocabulary, and a rich phoneme inventory (written with letters such as œ, ħ, ø, and ʉ); it would make both communication and thought more efficient and precise. A single phoneme indicates a word, so a "word" indicates a sentence. In the only example given, a "word" means "The far horizons draw no nearer."

== Examples of Speedtalk ==
Two untranslated conversations appear in the story:

"œnɪe ʀ ħøg rylp"
"nU"

"tsʉmaeq?"
"nø!"
"zUlntsɨ."
"ɨpbitʹ New Jersey."

== Attempts at creating Speedtalks ==
Mark Rosenfelder's Language Construction Kit has a section on Speedtalk entitled How many words do you need?. He highlights the main problems with Speedtalk:

- Basic English claims to have reduced English to 850 basic words, but only by exploiting English-speakers' extensive vocabulary of homonyms and idioms
- The built-in redundancy of natural languages allows utterances to be understood in spite of not being clearly heard

This first point has been made somewhat irrelevant by the comments of Ben Sandler in his article "Speedtalk", demonstrating a system by which many thousands of meaningful sounds can be created. As such, some have attempted to construct similar languages. Ithkuil, in particular, comes close to this ideal, with the vast majority of its morphemes being a single syllable, and sometimes even a single phoneme, in length. However, the author of the language states that this was not the language's primary purpose; the conciseness of its meaningful units was meant to foster "maximal communication of cognitive intent in the most efficient manner; a somewhat different purpose, in which brevity per se is irrelevant."
