= Perceptual dialectology =

Study of how people perceive dialects

Perceptual dialectology is the scientific study of how ordinary individuals perceive variation in language—where they believe it exists, where they believe it comes from, how they believe it functions, and how they socially evaluate it.

Perceptual dialectology differs from ordinary dialectology in that it is concerned not with empirical linguistic understandings or discoveries about language itself, but rather with empirical research on how non-linguists perceive language, also known as folk linguistics, which includes how non-linguists perceive various accents, vocabulary usages, grammatical structures, etc. Such perceptions may or may not align with actual linguistic findings. Perceptual dialectology falls under the general field of sociolinguistics.

Common topics in the study of perceptual dialectology include the comparison of folk perceptions of dialect boundaries with traditional linguistic definitions, the examination of what factors influence folk perceptions of variation, and what social characteristics individuals attribute to various dialects.

== History ==
Linguists disagree on whether the beginnings of perceptual dialectology can be traced to the 1920s in Japan or the Netherlands in the 1930s.

A pioneering study in traditional perceptual dialectology took place in the Netherlands in 1939 and was conducted by W.G. Rensink. The study sought to investigate perceptual dialect boundaries through a Dutch dialect survey in which subjects were asked to state whether they thought other people spoke the same or different dialect as them, and what the dialect difference was if there was deemed to be any. Weijnen analyzed this data through the little-arrow method that she devised. Many studies proceeded from this, and perceptual dialectology surveys took place in various countries.

Perceptual dialectology studies in Japan were also taking place during the early 20th century. Japanese methodology was fundamentally different from the Netherlands' in that informants were asked to judge differences between dialects on degrees of difference (for example, from 'not different' to 'incomprehensible'). Data was thus analyzed by drawing lines between areas to indicate a scale of difference, and was the first method in 'calculating' perceptual boundaries.

Linguists became increasingly interested in how non-linguists distinguish between language varieties, including the fact that pitch accent is one of the major ways that non-linguists distinguish between varieties.

Contemporary perceptual dialectology was spearheaded by Dennis Preston, who is seen to be the major proponent of perceptual dialectology. His five-point approach to the study has been a benchmark for the advancement of the field.

Language attitude studies and its related matched-guise methodology are also seen to be related to perceptual dialectology.

== Methodology 1.0 ==
=== Little arrow method ===
The little arrow method is an early method for comparing regional dialects. In the little arrows method, researchers begin with a general map of a region, often with traditional linguistic dialect boundaries indicated for reference. Then, informants from several sites are asked how similar they believe the language of other sites is to their own. Sites which participants indicate as being extremely similar are connected by a "little arrow." By gathering responses from several informants and sites, these "little arrows" connect to form networks of related languages. From this information, information on perceptual dialectical boundaries can be drawn. Perceptual dialect categories consist of areas linked together by the "little arrows," and dialect borders are indicated when there are no connections between sites. These informant-perceived categories can then be compared to more traditional linguistic boundaries for further analysis.

=== Preston's five-point method ===
The Preston five-point method is a set of techniques developed by Preston for the study of perceptual dialectology in the 1980s. The specific measures composing the five-point method include:

- Draw-a-Map: in this method, informants are given a blank or very simplified map of the region being studied, and are asked to draw borders identifying the locations where they believe different dialects exist. Computerized methods of interpretation can also be used to draw generalized maps to be generated from the responses.
- Degree of Difference: In this method, informants are asked to rate the similarity or difference of the language of two regions, often on a numerical scale. Preston's original methods use a scale of 1-4 (where 1=same, 2=a little different, 3=different, and 4=unintelligibly different). Such comparisons usually ask the informant to rank a neighboring region in comparison to the participant’s home region.
- Correct and Pleasant: this method asks informants to rate regions according to how “correct” or “pleasant” the variants spoken there are, either on a numerical scale or in comparison to other regions. Although Preston mostly investigated measures of "correctness" or "pleasantness," other works may also investigate other subjective qualities, such as whether a language is "formal" or "casual", "polite" or "rude", "educated" or "uneducated."
- Dialect identification: methods ask informants to listen to recorded speech samples from a given dialect continuum and attempt to identify the region the sample is from.
- Qualitative data: in addition to the aforementioned methods of gathering data, researchers in perceptual dialectology also gather data by asking more open-ended interview questions about the subjects thoughts on language variants, speakers, and other topics of interest.

== Topics in perceptual dialectology ==
=== Linguistic vs. folk judgments ===
One of the areas of perceptual dialectology is discerning linguistic and folk judgments. A study by Zoë Boughton investigates perceptual dialectology in northern France through a dialect identification task. Subjects were asked to identify the regional origin of a speaker after listening to a voice samples. The Pays de la Loire respondents (from Nancy and Rennes, respectively the northeastern and northwestern regions) were not especially successful at correctly identifying the regional origins of the voice samples, but were able to detect some differences between the Nancy and Rennes speakers. The results suggest two regional-perceptual axes: the "North/east" relating to regional or social accent divergence, while the "West/Centre/Paris" is more related to standardness of accent and convergence. The usage of authentic speech samples for identification reveals how well subjects are able to actually perceive the differences between dialects according to their own folk beliefs.

=== Factors in deciding boundaries ===
==== Geography ====
People generally regard their own dialect as distinct from other quite similar ones. A study of Bostonians reflected this tendency. People outside of the New England area saw speech as having a single Bostonian accent, while Bostonians themselves perceived different dialect boundaries, with their own region being separate from the rest of the New England area. When 50 Bostonians were asked to draw perceived dialect boundaries and rate degrees of pleasantness and correctness to examine similarities and differences, they varied significantly, reflecting the difficulty of establishing distinct dialect boundaries when mapping isoglosses.

==== Social classes ====
Perceptual dialectology also concerns itself with social dialects as well as regional dialects. Social dialects are those associated with certain social classes or groups, rather than with a region. An example of this is African American Vernacular English, to which is attributed lower education, ignorance, and laziness. In one study, white college males were asked to imitate black male speech and vice versa. The findings concluded that white college males immediately understood what the researcher meant when he asked the white male subjects to "talk like a black man." When completing their assigned task, the white males had a ready-made phonology, a set of paralinguistic features of pitch range, rhythm, and vocal quality, and a rich and detailed variety of roles and topics. Some of the roles the white male subjects portrayed included a basketball player, a hip, cool person, and a street person. The topics included dancing, violence, and slavery. Yet, the white males had an extremely limited number of morphological and syntactic devices and a small comically exaggerated lexicon (including ethnically stereotyped lexemes).

==== Slang ====
Slang can also be influential for non-linguists in determining where dialect boundaries are. Many of the labels in a dialect mapping task focused on slang terms when studying perceptual dialectology of English spoken in California. University of California, Santa Barbara students were asked to label a map of California according to subjects, particularly Southern Californians, used "hella" to identify the Northern California region. "Dude" was also used to identify the San Diego region.

=== Pleasantness and correctness ===
Ratings of pleasantness and correctness of dialects vary between speakers of different dialects. Speakers with the Southern accent from Memphis, Tennessee, rated other Southern regions as less correct than other regions, but no less pleasant. Surprisingly, they rated their own speech as least educated and pleasant. Speakers from Memphis were also much more aware of distinctions among dialects within the South, but were not aware of differences in other regions such as the West, lumping it as one largely "correct" area. There were also varying ratings of pleasantness and correctness among regions within the South. When English speakers from Reno, Nevada rated Southern English, they rated it as less correct and pleasant and most different from their own speech.

=== Historical perceptual dialectology ===
Historical perceptual dialectology allows linguists to examine how and why dialects in the past gained popularity. Linguists gain the chance to examine how the perceptual dialectology of certain dialects of languages have evolved over a given time. The principal scholar examining perceptual dialectology is Dennis Preston, and his methodology involves interview-based techniques. Applying the initial methodology used in the field of perceptual dialectology would be impossible when examining the dialects of the past.

Historical perceptual dialectology must not be confused with historical linguistics, which is concerned with changes in linguistic phenomena over time. Unlike historical linguistics, historical perceptual dialectology is used to contribute to the social understanding of language and is used to link dialect perceptions to political and intellectual history. Historical perceptual dialectology also has the ability to date the emergence of dialects.

Issues with historical perceptual dialectology include relying on the text of the literate population of the past. Considering perceptual dialectology is interested in the perceptions of the common folk, relying on data from a social group of a population is not an accurate representation of the general population. Subjects should be taken from a large pool when using interview techniques such as Dennis Preston's. Another issue is having only a single case to examine.

Alexander Maxwell, a scholar of historical perceptual dialectology, examined the emergence of the three dialects of Slovak and how the general population of Slovak speakers came to accept that three dialects of Slovak exist. Maxwell used articles written mostly by "amateur linguists and language planners." He was interested in seeing how Slovak perceptual dialectology had evolved over time to reach the consensus of the general population. Maxwell found that perceptions of dialects shifted with political shifts.

Examining historical perceptual dialectology, evidence shows shifts in perceptions of dialects are directly correlated to historical shifts, whether political, intellectual, or social. These studies imply the need to study linguistics with respect to history.

=== Language attitude studies ===
In addition to studying how and where nonlinguistics identify dialects, perceptual dialectology also considers itself with what attributes nonlinguists assign to those dialects. When informants associate a particular language variety with a particular group, the presumed social attributes of the group are transferred to the dialect itself. That dialect is then associated with those attributes even when informants cannot correctly identify the source of the dialect. Thus, dialects can come to index certain perceived social attributes such as formality, politeness, friendliness, intelligence, snobbishness, and other traits. Individuals who use these variants can then gain the appearance of the social traits attributed to the dialect.

== Implications ==
As a field that studies the intersection of linguistic science with human behavior and cultural differences, the study of perceptual dialectology also reveals information of interest to many fields outside of just linguistics, including sociology, cultural anthropology, and other fields that study human thoughts and behavior.

Perceptual dialectology also has greater implications for the general field of linguistics as a whole. While folk linguistic judgments are often examined in contrast to formal linguistic analyses, strongly held folk judgments can in turn affect people's performance of language. An understanding of perceptual dialectology is useful for understanding the ways in which people's opinions on language can influence their actual behavior, in areas such as language change and language attitude studies.

Finally, the findings of perceptual dialectology can prove useful in applied fields such as language teaching, where knowledge of how subjects regard different languages or varieties can be vital for increasing successful outcomes.
