= Folk linguistics =

Aspect of linguistic studies

Folk linguistics consists of statements, beliefs, or practices concerning language which are based on uninformed speculation rather than based on the scientific method, which characterizes the modern field of linguistics. Folk linguistics sometimes arises when scientific conclusions about language come off as counterintuitive to native speakers. However, folk linguistics may also be motivated by confirmation bias, prejudice, ideology, or nationalism.

== Examples ==
Jackendoff (2003) cites the following statements as typical examples of folk-linguistic beliefs.

- Claim: "Parents teach their children to talk". Adults assume that children either learn language directly from their parents or via simple imitation.
  - On the contrary, research in child language acquisition shows that a child acquires language more automatically, through a systematic pattern rarely noticed by adults. Although interaction with parents, adults, and other children is crucial, it is very difficult to "correct" a child. Instead, most children can learn to speak native languages (including those of their peers of the same age) through a process called "acquisition". Any errors noticed by a parent are often self-corrected by the child weeks or months later.
- Claim: "Children will get confused if they try to speak more than one language". Many parents are afraid a child cannot sort out input from multiple languages.
  - In reality, children can easily become multilingual if they are exposed to more than one language. There may be a period of confusion, but most children are able to segregate many distinct grammars.
- Claim: "There is a proper, correct English". Speakers generally value an educated form of the language, often its written form, and that other dialectal/spoken forms are considered structurally inferior or "sloppy", and speakers of these forms are often regarded as "stupid, lazy, sloppy, hick" or other pejorative terms.
  - However, linguists generally agree that vernacular varieties such as African American Vernacular English (AAVE) have the same grammatical complexity as standard forms of English. Folk linguistic beliefs view these lects as inferior, and as a result speakers of non-standard forms often suffer forms of linguistic discrimination.
- Claim: "The modern language is going downhill". Purists opine that changes in the spoken language (e.g. new words, innovations in grammar, new pronunciation patterns) are detrimental rather than just change.
  - In fact, living languages are not static. Their evolution is not just a modern phenomenon.

Other beliefs may include:

- A belief that a language's grammar can negatively influence and restrict how people think. This is also known as the strong Sapir–Whorf hypothesis. Although some linguists do advocate a form of this, many linguists reject this as being too simplistic. For instance, just because a language does not formally distinguish "he" vs. "she" in their personal pronouns does not mean that speakers do not distinguish and treat men and women differently. Similarly, just because English lacks a formal hodiernal tense does not mean that English speakers cannot distinguish events which occur "today" versus those on another day.
- Examples of folk etymology such as interpreting asparagus as "sparrow-grass". These are cases where speakers deduce an incorrect word origin. Another folk etymology is the assumption that the New York place name Fishkill (on Fishkill Creek) means a place to kill fish. In reality, -kill is from a Dutch word meaning "creek" (found also in river names such as Schuylkill, Pennsylvania and Wallkill, New Jersey). However, the folk etymology caused animal rights groups such as PETA to lobby that the town should be renamed.

== See also ==
- Common English usage misconceptions
- Folk etymology
  - Pseudo-etymology, sometimes also called "folk etymology"
- Perceptual dialectology
- Linguistic prescription
- Pseudoscientific language comparison
- Mythical origins of language
- Vseyasvetnaya Gramota
