= Experimental language =

Constructed language designed for linguistics research

An experimental language is a constructed language designed for linguistics research, often on the relationship between language and thought.

One particular assumption having received much attention in fiction is popularly known as the Sapir–Whorf hypothesis. The claim is that the structure of a language somehow affects the way its speakers perceive their world, either strongly, in which case "language determines thought" (linguistic determinism), or weakly, in which case "language influences thought" (linguistic relativity). (For a list of languages that are merely mentioned, see the relevant section in List of constructed languages.)

The extreme case of the strong version of the hypothesis would be the idea that words have a power inherent to themselves such that their use determines not just our thoughts, but also that which our thoughts are about, i.e. reality itself.

== Languages exploring the Sapir–Whorf hypothesis ==
=== Constructed languages ===
- Láadan was designed by linguist Suzette Haden Elgin in her science fiction novel Native Tongue, about a patriarchal society in which the overriding priority of the oppressed women is the secret development of a "feminist" language, Láadan, to aid them in throwing off their shackles.
- Loglan, by James Cooke Brown, was designed for linguistic research with the specific goal of making a language so different from natural languages that people learning it would think in a different way if the hypothesis were true.
- Lojban is the successor of Loglan and has the same goals.
- Toki Pona, by Sonja Lang (née Kisa), is inspired by Taoist philosophy, among other things, and designed to shape the thought processes of its users in Zen-like fashion.

=== Fictional languages ===
==== Named ====
- Babel-17, by Samuel R. Delany, is centered on a fictional language that denies its speakers independent thought, forcing them to think purely logical thoughts. This language is used as a weapon of war, because it is supposed to convert everyone who learns it to a traitor. In the novel, the language Babel-17 is likened to computer programming languages that do not allow errors or imprecise statements.
- Marain, in Iain M. Banks's Culture series. The Culture believes (or perhaps has proved, or else actively made true) the Sapir–Whorf hypothesis that language affects society, and Marain was designed to exploit this effect. A related comment is made by the narrator in The Player of Games regarding gender-specific pronouns in English. Marain is also regarded as an aesthetically pleasing language.
- Newspeak, a government-constructed dialect of English described by George Orwell in his dystopian novel Nineteen Eighty-Four, does not have any of the words expressing the ideas underlying a revolution with the idea that its speakers cannot revolt. All of the theory of Newspeak is aimed at eliminating such words. For example, bad has been replaced by ungood, and the concept of "freedom" has been eliminated over time. According to the appendix on Newspeak, the result of the adoption of the language would be that "a heretical thought ... should be literally unthinkable, at least so far as thought is dependent on words." The language is under continuous development during the events of the novel, with the Ministry of Truth (Minitrue in Newspeak) releasing progressively thinner and thinner Newspeak dictionaries.
- Pravic is one of the languages used in The Dispossessed, by Ursula K. Le Guin, that takes place partly on a world with an anarcho-communist society. Pravic contains little means for expressing possessive relationships, among other features.
- Tamarian, in the Star Trek: The Next Generation episode "Darmok", is unintelligible to Starfleet's universal translators because it is too deeply rooted in local metaphor and consequently its sentences have no meaning to other civilizations.
- Valiant, Technicant and Cogitant, in The Languages of Pao by Jack Vance, are designed to stimulate the development of warrior, technical and mercantile castes in a stagnant society. The mastermind behind this experiment, Lord Palafox, says in chapter 9: "We must alter the mental framework of the Paonese people, which is most easily achieved by altering the language." His son, Finisterle, says in chapter 11 to a class of linguists in training: "every language impresses a certain world-view upon the mind."

==== Unnamed ====
- In Anthem, by Ayn Rand, the World Council attempted to enforce collectivist thinking among the populace by removing from the language all words expressing individuality.
- In Dune, by Frank Herbert, Lady Jessica (who has extensive linguistic training) encounters the Fremen, the native people of Dune. She is shocked by the violence of their language, as she believes their word choices and language structure reflect a culture of enormous violence. Similarly, earlier in the novel, her late husband, Duke Leto, muses on how the nature of Imperial society is betrayed by "the precise delineations for treacherous death" in its language, the use of highly specific terms to describe different methods for delivering poison.
- In Gulf, by Robert A. Heinlein, the characters are taught an artificial language which allows them to think logically and concisely by removing the "false to fact" linguistic constructs of existing languages.
- In Mud/Aurora, by D.D. Storm, society is divided in three classes speaking three different languages, designed to allow survival on a hostile, deserted world of a wrecked starship's crew and their descendants. The long-forgotten ship's linguist hid the true history of their world within the language spoken by the descendants of the commanding officers, the Sah.
- Snow Crash, by Neal Stephenson, explores the (controversial) concept of neuro-linguistic programming and presents the Sumerian language as the firmware programming language for the brain stem which is supposedly functioning as the BIOS for the human brain. According to characters in the book, the goddess Asherah is the personification of a linguistic virus similar to a computer virus. The god Enki created a counter program which he called a nam-shub that caused all of humanity to speak different languages as a protection against Asherah, supposedly giving rise to the biblical story of the Tower of Babel.
- In Story of Your Life, by Ted Chiang, the inspiration for the film Arrival, learning the written language used by alien visitors to the Earth allows the person who learns the language to think in a different way, in which the past and future are illusions of conventional thought. This allows people who understand the language to see their entire life as a single unchangeable action, from past to future.
- In Stranger in a Strange Land, by Robert A. Heinlein, Valentine Michael Smith is able to do things that most other humans cannot, and is unable to explain any of this in English. However, once others learn Martian, they start to develop the ability to do these things; those concepts could be explained only in Martian.
- The Unnamable, by H.P. Lovecraft, explores the idea of whether or not someone can conceptualize something which cannot be described by any name.
- In Tlön, Uqbar, Orbis Tertius, by Jorge Luis Borges, the author discovers references in books to a universe of idealistic individuals whose languages have peculiarities that shape their idealism. For example, one of the language families lacks nouns, while another primarily uses monosyllabic adjectives to describe objects. As the story progresses the books become more and better known to the world at large, their philosophy starts influencing the real world, and Earth becomes the ideal world described in the books.

==== Counterexamples ====
- In The Citadel of the Autarch, by Gene Wolfe, one of the characters (an Ascian) speaks entirely in slogans, but is able to express deep and subtle meanings via context. The narrator, Severian, after hearing the Ascian speak, remarks that "The Ascian seemed to speak only in sentences he had learned by rote, though until he used each for the first time we had never heard them ... Second, I learned how difficult it is to eliminate the urge for expression. The people of Ascia were reduced to speaking only with their masters' voice; but they had made of it a new tongue, and I had no doubt, after hearing the Ascian, that by it he could express whatever thought he wished."

== Languages exploring other linguistic aspects ==
Several constructed languages are closer to the oligosynthetic type than any attested natural languages:

- Ithkuil, by John Quijada, designed for maximum morpho-phonological conciseness.
- Ilaksh, by John Quijada, the phonologically simpler successor to Ithkuil.
- Zaum is the experimental poetic language characterized by indeterminacy in meaning intended to describe the linguistic experiments of the Russian Futurist poets.

== See also ==
- Alien language
- Artistic language
- Engineered language
- Fictional language
- ISO, SIL, and BCP language codes for constructed languages
