= In the Land of Invented Languages =

2009 book by Arika Okrent

- Author: Arika Okrent
- Publisher: Spiegel & Grau
- Publication date: 19 May 2009
- Pages: 342
- ISBN: 978-0-385-52788-0
- Dewey Decimal: 499.99

In the Land of Invented Languages: Esperanto Rock Stars, Klingon Poets, Loglan Lovers, and the Mad Dreamers who Tried to Build a Perfect Language is a 2009 non-fiction book by linguist Arika Okrent about the history and culture of constructed languages, or conlangs, languages created by individuals. Okrent explores the motivations for creating a language, the challenges faced by such projects, and the outcomes of a number of high-profile conlangs. The book revolves around six conlangs: John Wilkins' unnamed 'philosophical language', Esperanto, Blissymbols, Loglan and its descendant Lojban, and the Klingon language designed for the Star Trek universe. Okrent describes her personal experiences learning and interacting with these languages and their speakers, and provides historical and linguistic analyses of their structures and features.

In the Land of Invented Languages was published by Spiegel & Grau, at the time an imprint of Random House, on 19 May 2009. The book received a generally positive reception from both literary critics and enthusiasts of constructed languages. It was praised for its humorous, intelligent, and informative style, as well as for its depth of research and accessibility to a wide audience. It was also noted for its perspective on the successes and failures of conlangs, and the paradoxes and dilemmas they pose for their creators and users.

== Background ==
Constructed languages, or conlangs, are intentionally created languages. Unlike natural languages, which naturally emerge from human communities, conlangs are developed by individuals or, rarely, small groups. Conlangs vary in their intent; artistic languages such as Quenya are designed for aesthetic purposes such as worldbuilding, engineered languages such as Ithkuil are designed for philosophical or experimental purposes, and auxiliary languages such as Esperanto are intended to be used for mass communication. Though conlangs have been recorded since the lingua ignota of Hildegard of Bingen in the twelfth century, they increased in popularity with the rise of the internet.

Arika Okrent is a linguist and journalist. She has a master's degree in linguistics from Gallaudet University, a university with a mostly deaf student body, and a Ph.D. in psycholinguistics from the University of Chicago. In the Land of Invented Languages was her first book. Okrent is fluent in American Sign Language and speaks or understands some level of Hungarian, Esperanto, and Brazilian Portuguese. She is also certified as having a basic understanding of Klingon by the Klingon Language Institute.

== Synopsis ==
The lot of the language inventor was almost always a hard one, and those who set out with the most confidence invariably ended up full of bitterness. Ben Prist, the Australian creator of Vela, simply could not understand why his language was being ignored, and blamed some kind of anti-Australian conspiracy. "Why aren't we allowed to have the easiest language possible?" he complains. "A child can go to a library and pick-up a book on pornography. Why can't a grown-up person pick-up a book on the easiest language possible? Is this democracy? Is this human? Where are our human rights?" He has no doubt that his work is an unrecognized masterpiece for which he has become a persecuted martyr.

— Arika Okrent

In the Land of Invented Languages is a historiography of constructed languages that pays particular attention to six major examples: John Wilkins' unnamed 'philosophical language', Esperanto by L. L. Zamenhof, Blissymbols by Charles K. Bliss, Loglan by James Cooke Brown and its descendant Lojban, and the Klingon language designed by Marc Okrand for the Star Trek universe. The book opens with Okrent's surprise at discovering the Klingon-speaking community; most conlangs find little success even when explicitly intended for wide use, and Okrent had not anticipated that a language intended for fictional use had real-world speakers. She met Mark, a fluent Klingon speaker who lived in the same town as her, and began research on the history and popularity of conlangs. Okrent chronologies conlangs from the perspective that most of them were failed experiments, and introduces the book with conlang inventors who had expected their languages to see far greater success than they did.

=== Early philosophical languages ===
The first full section revolves around An Essay Towards a Real Character, and a Philosophical Language, Wilkins' explication of his "ideal language". John Wilkins was a clergyman and scholar who abetted many of the academics of his era but sought relatively little recognition himself. His greatest focus was his constructed language, which intended to fix what he considered the problem "that words tell you nothing about the things they refer to"; Okrent sees this through the lens of a seventeenth-century fad for conlanging in general, which she ascribes to an Enlightenment drive to bring order to unordered natural languages. She discusses contemporaries such as Thomas Urquhart, himself interested in language construction, who wrote a manuscript on his attempt titled "Gold out of Dung". The title referred to wherefrom he salvaged the pages—beneath the dead bodies of soldiers who had captured him in battle, who commandeered them for what he called "posterior uses".

Wilkins endeavoured to catalogue subjects by their traits and build words accordingly; Okrent gives the example of zitα ("dog"), which is built from the particles for "clawed, rapacious, oblong-headed, land-dwelling beast of docile disposition". Okrent discusses the difficulty of translating between Wilkins' language and any other, due to his desire to represent every concept with an individual word. When she attempts to find a translation for "clear", she finds multiple relevant definitions across vastly different parts of Wilkins' phylogenetic language structure. She credits his work as influencing the thesaurus, library classification systems such as the Dewey Decimal System, and taxonomy in biology, but describes his attempt to create a philosophically perfect language as succeeding only at "show[ing] that it was a ridiculous idea".

=== Esperanto ===
The Esperanto flag, a symbol of the language and its culture

The second section of the book deals with Esperanto. Of all conlangs, Esperanto has by far the most users, including multi-generational native speakers. Okrent describes her experience attending an Esperantist convention, which she thought would be poorly attended and mostly conducted in English. She was surprised to find virtually all the attendees were fluent Esperanto speakers, and particularly surprised to meet the musician Kim J. Henriksen and his son, both native speakers.

Esperanto and other auxiliary languages ("auxlangs") arose in a different landscape to previous philosophical languages. Though French had become the common language of international discourse by the 19th century, it was progressively displaced as industrialization brought wealth and international travel to broader sections of the population. Demand rose for a language comprehensible across European language barriers, bringing rise to such attempts as Universalglot and Volapük. The latter, as Okrent chronicles, was particularly important to the origin and popularity of Esperanto; it was the first widely popular auxlang and an inspiration for its successors, but Esperanto overtook it in the late 19th century due to ideological schisms in the Volapük movement. Okrent focuses on how Esperanto's success related to the popularity of Zamenhof as a figure and symbol of its movement. Though Esperanto too saw language schisms, resulting in the creation of Ido, it remained dominant due to its speakers' devotion to Zamenhof.

Okrent is particularly interested in what she considers Esperanto's paradoxical success and failure. The purpose of Esperanto was to serve as a universal auxiliary language, a goal at which it has not yet succeeded; nonetheless, Esperanto speakers form a thriving community estimated to number hundreds of thousands of people. She singles out the Pasporta Servo service, which provides free lodgings to Esperanto-speaking travellers worldwide. Okrent quotes profiles from contemporary Pasporta Servo hosts, including a "gay vegetarian ornithologist" in Belgium, a founder of a "club of light and peace" in Mozambique, a "railroad lover" in Japan, and a Ukrainian host accepting "only hippies, punks, freaks, and cannabis smokers". She argues that Esperantists form a distinct culture, and draws parallels between it and Modern Hebrew, itself a consciously revived language.

=== Blissymbols ===
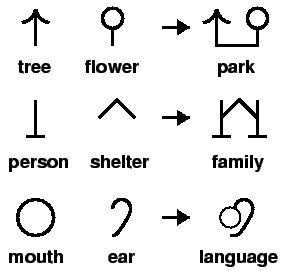
Several Blissymbols, demonstrating how symbols for individual words combine to produce additional words

The third section of individual was In the Land of Invented Languages is about Blissymbols, invented by Charles K. Bliss, a chemical engineer who fled Europe after surviving the Buchenwald concentration camp. Bliss moved to Shanghai and developed an interest in Chinese characters. He attempted to learn them, thinking they could be a base for a "universal language", but felt after failed study that a pictogram system would be a better foundation for such a project. Bliss designed his Blissymbols writing system to minimize ambiguity, which he hoped would end falsehoods, propaganda, and other matters he considered flaws of language. When Bliss emigrated to Australia in the 1940s, he evangelized Blissymbols to linguists and academic publishers to little avail, and came to think his system would never receive the popularity he felt it deserved.

In the late 1960s, Blissymbols were discovered by teachers at the Ontario Crippled Children's Centre working with nonverbal severely disabled children. They found the system revealed unexpected communicative capacities in children assumed to have profound intellectual impairments, and sought out Bliss to assist them with basing a formal education program around Blissymbols. While he was first overjoyed by the recognition, the relationship grew increasingly strained as the school diverged from what he considered the system's intent; Okrent gives the examples of him castigating the teachers for combining the "food" and "out" symbols to make "picnic", when he intended that combination to mean "restaurant", and of disparaging their use of formal grammatical concepts such as "nouns" and "verbs". As she put it, "he had created a "universal" language that no one else could figure out how to use". Okrent's view of Blissymbols is as a paradox; the system saw substantially more success than typical for contemporary conlangs, but its creator opposed and criticised that success.

=== Loglan and Lojban ===
Frankly, the thought of trying to capture Lojban in a nutshell for you — something I have tried to do with the languages I've discussed in previous chapters — fills me with despair. There is just so much. The language is specified to within an inch of its life. The reference grammar comes to over six hundred pages. This doesn't even include a dictionary.

— Arika Okrent

In the fourth section, Okrent discusses James Cooke Brown's invention of Loglan and its descendant Lojban. Loglan was an attempt at creating a "logical language" to test the Sapir–Whorf hypothesis, the conjecture that language shapes thought; if the hypothesis was correct, "speaking in logic" would facilitate logical thought itself. The language received substantial scholarly attention following its 1960 publication in Scientific American, which Okrent singles out as remarkable. She ascribes this attention to Brown's scientific mindset in presenting his language as a specific experiment, and to his more grounded claims than utopian predecessors. Despite these auspicious beginnings, Loglan was mired in controversy due to Brown's defensiveness of his language and alienation of its supporters. Lojban, a relexification, was created in a schism after Brown refused to permit use of Loglan dictionaries to people who disagreed with him.

Lojban is an exceptionally specific language that Okrent compares to speech "filtered through the sensibilities of a bratty, literal-minded eight-year-old". When attempting to translate to it, as she did for Wilkins' language, she finds the task practically impossible. Not only is the vocabulary extremely precise (Okrent provides the example of arbitrary translating as "x is random/fortuitous/unpredictable under conditions y, with probability distribution z"), the "exhaustively defined" syntax means sentences can change drastically in meaning depending on their structure. When Okrent managed a grammatically-accurate translation of a single sentence, she reported it to a Lojbanist group at a convention, who informed her that it was incorrect. She notes that this is a common problem for Lojbanists, giving the example of an internet argument where a participant told his interlocutor in Lojban to "go fuck yourself"; a new argument ensued about his mistranslation of the exclamation.

=== Klingon and artistic languages ===
The book's final section returns to Klingon. Okrent overviews the language's creation by Marc Okrand, a linguist of Native American languages, and its features. She remarks on how its unusual features such as its extensive use of the agglutinative coexist with its similarity to natural languages, calling it "completely believable as a language, but somehow very, very odd". After discussing the Klingon convention she attended with Mark, where she met many of what she estimates to be the 20–30 people who can speak Klingon, Okrent focuses on the general concept of artistic languages or "artlangs". She discusses other fictional languages, such as the languages constructed by J. R. R. Tolkien, as well as languages she deems designed for artistic purposes, such as Toki Pona. According to later reviews, Okrent's discussion of artlangs was briefer than her discussion of other conlangs.

== Publication and reception ==
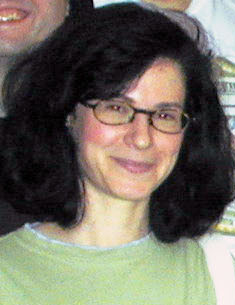
Arika Okrent in 2006

In the Land of Invented Languages was published 19 May 2009 by Spiegel & Grau, at the time an imprint of Random House. It is 342 pages long. In the Land of Invented Languages was Okrent's first book; her second book Highly Irregular, about the history of English spelling, was published through Oxford University Press in July 2021.

Upon its release, the book received generally positive reviews. Publishers Weekly gave it a starred review, conferred to books of "truly outstanding quality", and described it as a "delightful tour of linguistic hubris". Writing for the New York Times, the author Roy Blount Jr. described In the Land of Invented Languages as "a pleasure to read" while simultaneously providing a deep scholarly examination of constructed languages. The linguist Daniel Everett praised the book in a review for SFGATE. Everett depicted the concept of language creation as "misguided", but referred to the book as "humorous, intelligent, entertaining and highly informative"; he described Okrent as "subtly and humorously" explaining what he considered the shortcomings of creators and users of such languages. An in-depth review in the Zócalo Public Square referred to In the Land of Invented Languages as "fascinating, accessible, and offer[ing] interesting insights into what we say and how we say it". The review took note of Okrent's depth of research, including analyses of languages difficult or obscure enough to have very few speakers, such as Lojban. Edwin Turner of Biblioklept recommended the book, stating it "confidently traverses the thin line between pop nonfiction and academic linguistics".

Graham M. Jones, associate professor of anthropology at the Massachusetts Institute of Technology, reviewed In the Land of Invented Languages in the Journal of Linguistic Anthropology. Though he noted that the book came from a popular perspective rather than an academic one, he nonetheless received it positively. Jones posited that Okrent's "wry" tone might be divisive, and referred to the book as "a cabinet of curiosity rather than a decorous museum". Another academic review by the writer Harley J. Sims in Mythlore first described In the Land of Invented Languages as "a long overdue gift to conlang enthusiasts and their burgeoning field", comparing it to The Search for the Perfect Language by Umberto Eco and Lunatic Lovers of Language by Marina Yaguello. Given the journal's focus on Tolkien studies, it paid particular attention to Okrent's handling of languages constructed by J. R. R. Tolkien. Sims found the book's discussion of such languages wanting, feeling it addressed artistic language as "a mere postscript" compared to conlangs intended for real-world use; he described this as "inexcusable" in an era where speculative fiction works are increasingly likely to include conlangs.

In the Land of Invented Languages was positively received by users of constructed languages. Usona Esperantisto, the official publication of Esperanto-USA, described Okrent as an "icon" in an interview and focused on the book's positive reception in Esperantist circles. The book has reportedly been used in linguistics courses at several universities.
