= Morphological typology =

Way of classifying the world's languages

Morphological typology is a way of classifying the languages of the world that groups languages according to their common morphological structures. The field organizes languages on the basis of how those languages form words by combining morphemes. Analytic languages contain very little inflection, instead relying on features like word order and auxiliary words to convey meaning. Synthetic languages, ones that are not analytic, are divided into two categories: agglutinative and fusional languages. Agglutinative languages rely primarily on discrete particles (prefixes, suffixes, and infixes) for inflection, while fusional languages "fuse" inflectional categories together, often allowing one word ending to contain several categories, such that the original root can be difficult to extract. A further subcategory of agglutinative languages are polysynthetic languages, which take agglutination to a higher level by constructing entire sentences, including nouns, as one word.

Analytic, fusional, and agglutinative languages can all be found in many regions of the world. However, each category is dominant in some families and regions and essentially nonexistent in others. Analytic languages encompass the Sino-Tibetan family, including Chinese, many languages in Southeast Asia, the Pacific, and West Africa, and a few of the Germanic languages. Fusional languages encompass most of the Indo-European family—for example, French, Russian, and Hindi—as well as the Semitic family and a few members of the Uralic family. Most of the world's languages, however, are agglutinative, including the Turkic, Japonic, Dravidian, and Bantu languages and most families in the Americas, Australia, the Caucasus, and non-Slavic Russia. Constructed languages take a variety of morphological alignments.

The concept of discrete morphological categories has been criticized. Some linguists argue that most, if not all, languages are in a permanent state of transition, normally from fusional to analytic to agglutinative to fusional again. Others take issue with the definitions of the categories, arguing that they conflate several distinct, if related, variables.

== History ==
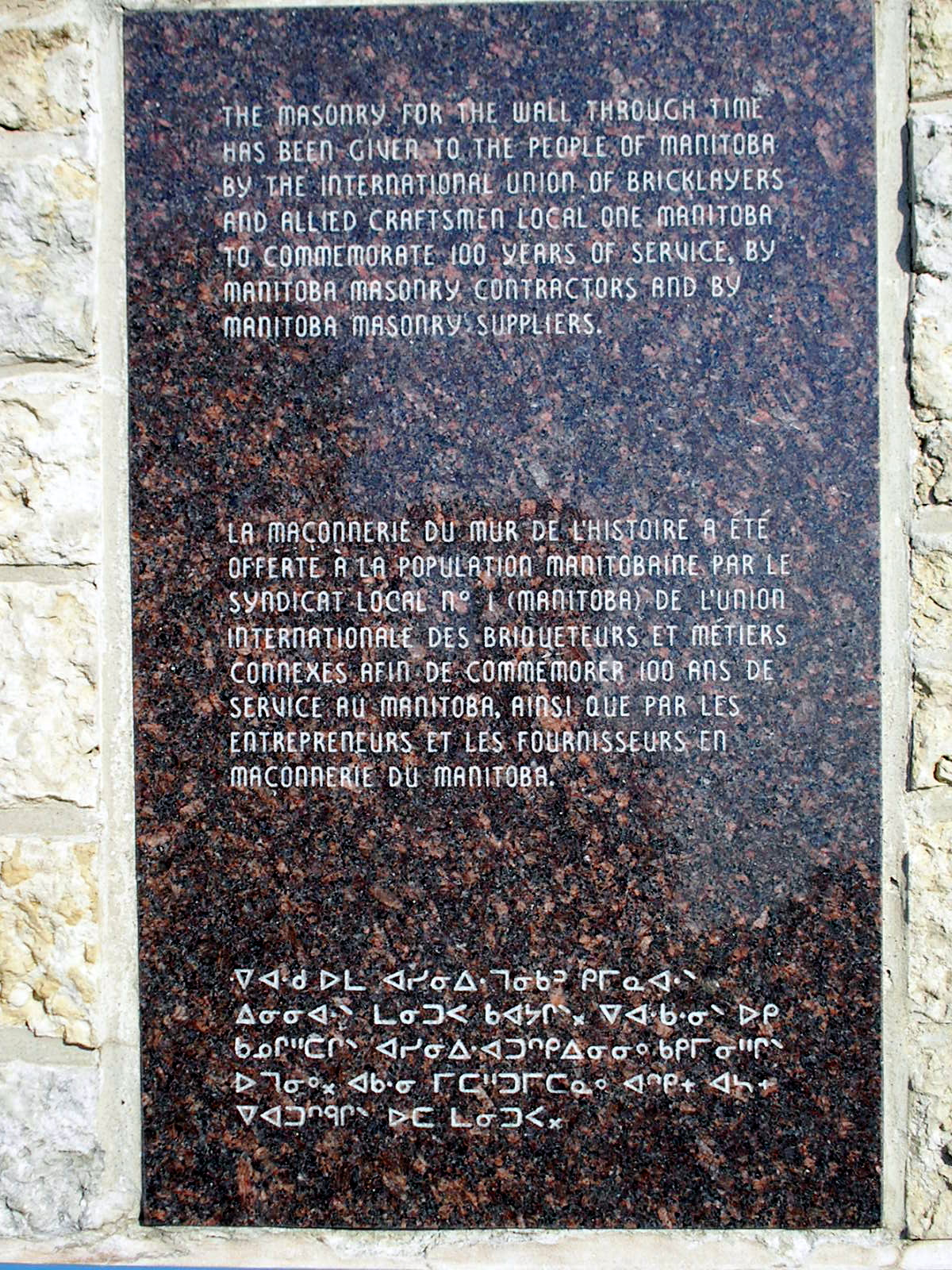
A trilingual plaque displaying members of all three major morphological alignments: analytic (English), fusional (French), and agglutinative (Plains Cree).

The field was first developed by brothers Friedrich von Schlegel and August von Schlegel.

== Analytic languages ==
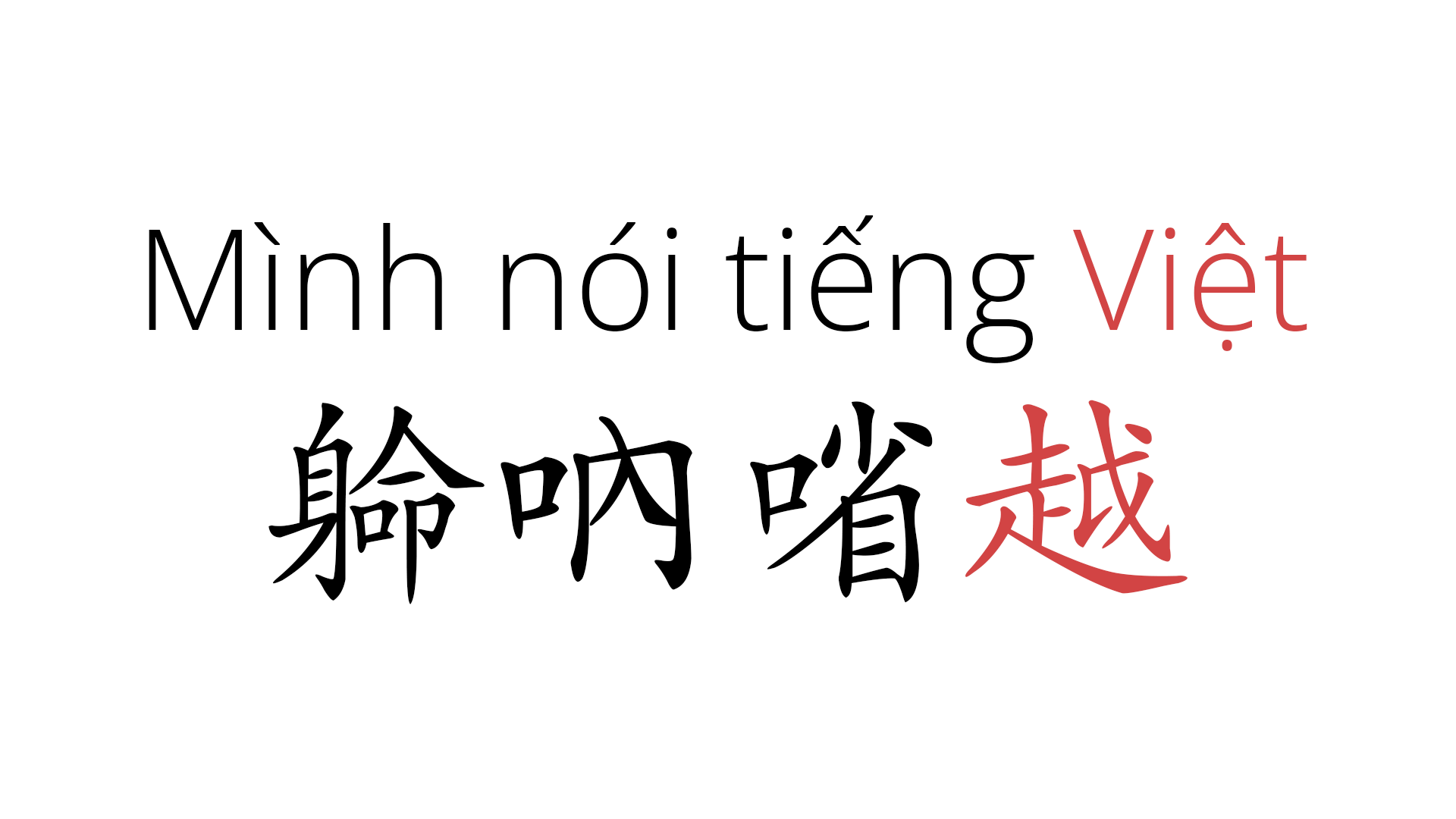
"I speak Vietnamese" in Vietnamese. Note the tonal, single-syllable nature of the words; this is frequent in analytic languages, i.e. ones in which there is little to no inflection and words stand on their own.

Analytic languages show a low ratio of morphemes to words; in fact, the correspondence is nearly one-to-one. Sentences in analytic languages are composed of independent root morphemes. Grammatical relations between words are expressed by separate words where they might otherwise be expressed by affixes, which are present to a minimal degree in such languages. There is little to no morphological change in words: they tend to be uninflected. Grammatical categories are indicated by word order (for example, inversion of verb and subject for interrogative sentences) or by bringing in additional words (for example, a word for "some" or "many" instead of a plural inflection like English -s). Individual words carry a general meaning (root concept); nuances are expressed by other words. Finally, in analytic languages context and syntax are more important than morphology.

Analytic languages include some of the major East Asian languages, such as Chinese, and Vietnamese. Note that the ideographic writing systems of these languages play a strong role in regimenting linguistic continuity according to an analytic, or isolating, morphology (cf. orthography).

Additionally, English, which is moderately analytic, and Afrikaans can be considered among the most analytic of all Indo-European languages. However, they are traditionally analyzed as fusional languages.

A related concept is the isolating language, one in which there is only one, or on average close to one, morpheme per word. Not all analytic languages are isolating; for example, Chinese and English possess many compound words, but contain few inflections for them.

== Synthetic languages ==
Synthetic languages form words by affixing a given number of dependent morphemes to a root morpheme. The morphemes may be distinguishable from the root, or they may not. They may be fused with it or among themselves (in that multiple pieces of grammatical information may potentially be packed into one morpheme). Word order is less important for these languages than it is for analytic languages, since individual words express the grammatical relations that would otherwise be indicated by syntax. In addition, there tends to be a high degree of concordance (agreement, or cross-reference between different parts of the sentence). Therefore, morphology in synthetic languages is more important than syntax. Most Indo-European languages are moderately synthetic.

There are two subtypes of synthesis, according to whether morphemes are clearly differentiable or not. These subtypes are agglutinative and fusional (or inflectional or flectional in older terminology).

=== Fusional languages ===
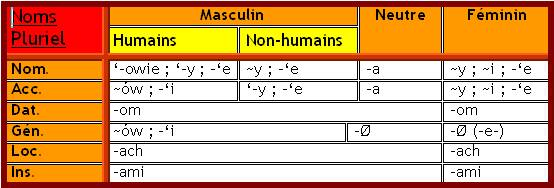
Polish noun declension collapses several factors into one ending: number (only plural is shown), gender, animacy, and case.

Morphemes in fusional languages are not readily distinguishable from the root or among themselves. Several grammatical bits of meaning may be fused into one affix. Morphemes may also be expressed by internal phonological changes in the root (i.e. morphophonology), such as consonant gradation and vowel gradation, or by suprasegmental features such as stress or tone.

The Indo-European and Semitic languages are the most typically cited examples of fusional languages. However, others have been described. For example, Navajo is sometimes categorized as a fusional language because its complex system of verbal affixes has become condensed and irregular enough that discerning individual morphemes is rarely possible. Some Uralic languages are described as fusional, particularly the Sami languages and Estonian. On the other hand, not all Indo-European languages are fusional; for example, English and Afrikaans, as well as some North Germanic languages lean more toward the analytic.

=== Agglutinative languages ===
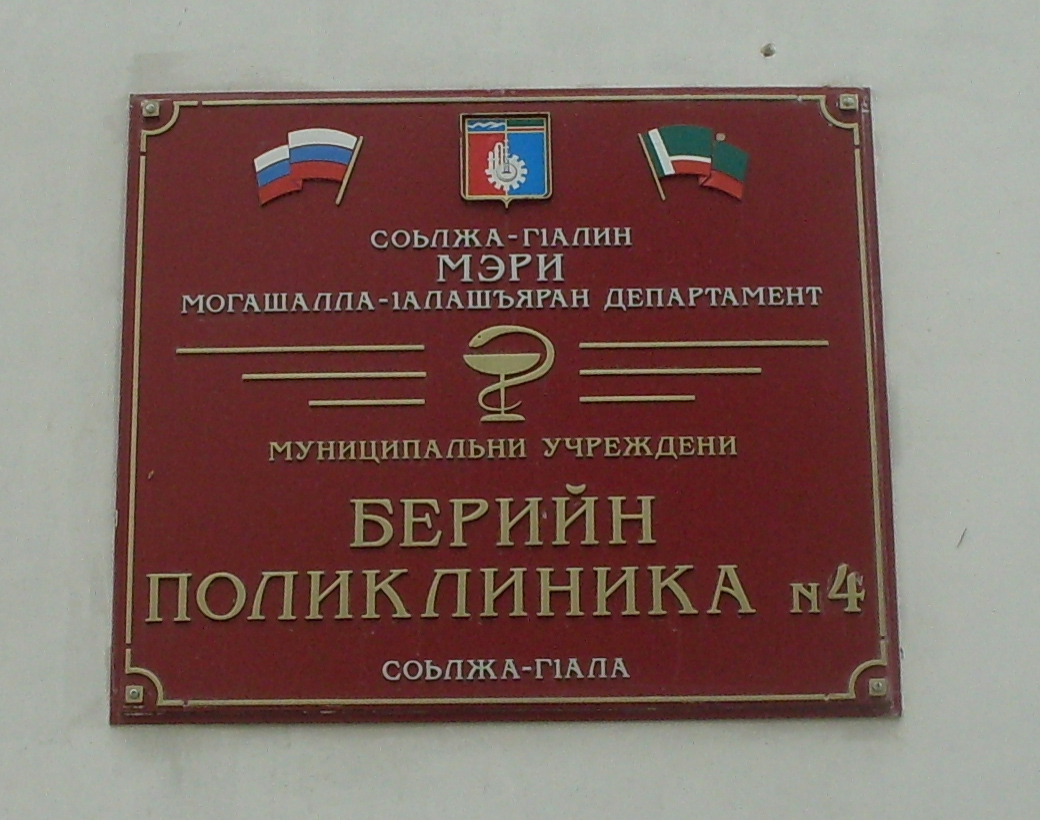
A plaque in Chechen, an agglutinative language.

Agglutinative languages have words containing several morphemes that are always clearly differentiable from one another in that each morpheme represents only one grammatical meaning and the boundaries between those morphemes are easily demarcated; that is, the bound morphemes are affixes, and they may be individually identified. Agglutinative languages tend to have a high number of morphemes per word, and their morphology is usually highly regular, with a notable exception being Georgian, among others.

Agglutinative languages include Finnish, Hungarian, Turkish, Mongolian, Korean, Japanese, Tamil, Telugu, Kannada, Malayalam, Saho, Swahili, Zulu and Indonesian.

=== Polysynthetic languages ===
In 1836, Wilhelm von Humboldt proposed a third category for classifying languages, a category that he labeled polysynthetic. (The term polysynthesis was first used in linguistics by Peter Stephen DuPonceau who borrowed it from chemistry.) These languages have a high morpheme-to-word ratio, a highly regular morphology, and a tendency for verb forms to include morphemes that refer to several arguments besides the subject (polypersonalism). Another feature of polysynthetic languages is commonly expressed as "the ability to form words that are equivalent to whole sentences in other languages". The distinction between synthetic languages and polysynthetic languages is therefore relative: the place of one language largely depends on its relation to other languages displaying similar characteristics on the same scale.

Many Amerindian languages are polysynthetic; indeed, most of the world's polysynthetic languages are native to North America. Inuktitut is one example, for instance the word-phrase: tavvakiqutiqarpiit roughly translates to "Do you have any tobacco for sale?". However, it is a common misconception that polysynthetic morphology is universal among Amerindian languages. Chinook and Shoshone, for instance, are simply agglutinative, as their nouns stand mostly separate from their verbs.

=== Oligosynthetic languages ===
Oligosynthetic languages are ones in which very few morphemes, perhaps only a few hundred, combine as in polysynthetic languages. Benjamin Whorf categorized Nahuatl and Blackfoot as oligosynthetic, but most linguists disagree with this classification and instead label them polysynthetic or simply agglutinative. No known languages are widely accepted as oligosynthetic.

== In constructed languages ==
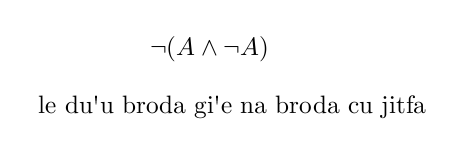
The rigidly defined, analytic words of Lojban make the language useful for describing logic – in this case, discrete mathematics.

Constructed languages (conlangs) take a variety of morphological alignments. Despite the Indo-European family's typical fusional alignment, most universal auxiliary languages based on the family have ended up being agglutinative morphologically because agglutination is more transparent than fusion and thus furthers various goals of the language creators. This pattern began with Volapük, which is strongly agglutinative, and was continued with Esperanto, which tends to be agglutinative as well. Other languages inspired by Esperanto like Ido and Novial also tend to be agglutinative, although some examples like Interlingua might be considered more fusional. Zonal constructed languages such as Interslavic tend to follow the language families they are based on.

Fictional languages vary among J. R. R. Tolkien's languages for the Middle earth universe, for example, Sindarin is fusional while Quenya is agglutinative. Among engineered languages, Toki Pona is completely analytic, as it contains only a limited set of words with no inflections or compounds. Lojban is analytic to the extent that every gismu (basic word, not counting particles) involves pre-determined syntactical roles for every gismu coming after it in a clause, though it does involve agglutination of roots when forming calques. Ithkuil, on the other hand, contains both agglutination in its addition of affixes and extreme fusion in that these affixes often result from the fusion of numerous morphemes via ablaut.

== Interconnectedness ==
While the above scheme of analytic, fusional, and agglutinative languages dominated linguistics for many years—at least since the 1920s—it has fallen out of favor more recently. A common objection has been that most languages display features of all three types, if not in equal measure, some of them contending that a fully fusional language would be completely suppletive. Jennifer Garland gives Sinhala as an example of a language that demonstrates the flaws in the traditional scheme: she argues that while its affixes, clitics, and postpositions would normally be considered markers of agglutination, they are too closely intertwined to the root, yet classifying the language as primarily fusional, as it usually is, is also unsatisfying.

=== WALS ===
The World Atlas of Language Structures (WALS) sees the categorization of languages as strictly analytic, agglutinative, or fusional as misleading, arguing that these categories conflate multiple variables. WALS lists these variables as:

- Phonological fusion – how intrinsically connected grammatical markers are phonologically to their host words
- Formative exponence – the number of categories expressed in a single marker (e.g., tense + number + gender for verbs in some languages)
- Flexivity – allomorphy and inflectional classes such as possessive classification

These categories allow to capture non-traditional distributions of typological traits. For example, high exponence for nouns (e.g., case + number) is typically thought of as a trait of fusional languages. However, it is absent in many traditionally fusional languages like Arabic but present in many traditionally agglutinative languages like Finnish, Yaqui, and Cree.

== Morphological richness ==
The morphological richness of a language refers to the extent to which it employs morphological processes in its grammar. Morphological richness can be measured in various ways, including the number of possible inflectional and derivational modifications of words, the average number of morphemes per word, and how transparently these morphemes correspond to grammatical or semantic distinctions.

Languages can be situated along a continuum of morphological richness. Morphologically poor (or weak) languages such as Mandarin, Haitian Creole, and English use morphology relatively sparingly, with much of their grammatical structure expressed at the phrase or sentence level. Morphologically rich languages such as Chukchi, Navajo, and German encode a large portion of their grammatical information within individual words.

In natural language processing (NLP), morphologically rich languages are often treated as a special class that requires tailored computational approaches. Because they exhibit extensive inflectional variation and complex word formation, they pose challenges for parsing, part-of-speech tagging, and other language technologies.
