= Comparison between Lojban and Loglan =

Comparison article on two logical conlangs

There are several crucial differences between Lojban and Loglan, two logical constructed languages. The main one is of the sounding of the core words, which, however, have similar phonotactics in both languages. Most grammatical particles also sound differently. Lojban alphabet lacks the letters q, w, h, but has the letter x and ' (apostrophe) (the last two absent in Loglan until 1977 for /h/ (spelled with an apostrophe) and x until 1986).

== History ==
James Cooke Brown called his language Loglan, and The Loglan Institute (TLI), the organization that he established, continues to call its language Loglan. The Logical Language Group called their project "Lojban: A Realization of Loglan" and considers Lojban a version of Loglan. Therefore, it is necessary to state that this page uses the term Loglan specifically to refer to the TLI language, instead of the entire family of languages.

== Lexicon ==
The principal difference between Lojban and Loglan is one of lexicon. A Washington DC splinter group, which later formed The Logical Language Group, LLG, decided in 1986 to remake the entire vocabulary of Loglan in order to evade Dr. Brown's claim of copyright to the language. After a lengthy battle in court, his claim to copyright was ruled invalid. But by then, the new vocabulary was already cemented as a part of the new language, which was called Lojban: A realization of Loglan by its supporters.

The closed set of five-letter words was the first part of the vocabulary to be remade. The words for Lojban were made by the same principles as those for Loglan; that is, candidate forms were chosen according to how many sounds they had in common with their equivalent in some of the most commonly spoken languages on Earth, which was then multiplied by the number of speakers of the languages with which the words had letters in common. The difference with the Lojban remake of the root words was that the weighting was updated to reflect the actual numbers of speakers for the languages. This resulted in word forms that had fewer sounds taken from English, and more sounds taken from Chinese. For instance, the Loglan word norma is equivalent to the Lojban word cnano (cf. Chinese 常, pinyin cháng), both meaning "normal". However, a significant number of Lojban words remain the same as their Loglan counterparts, and it is possible to construct entire sentences with the exact same meaning and pronunciation between the two languages: for instance, "i ai mi nenri le midju pe le condi dertu" ("I intend to be in the middle of the deep dirt").

Grammatical particles were gradually added to Lojban as the grammatical description of the language was made.

== Grammar ==
Loglan and Lojban still have essentially the same grammars, and most of what can be said in the short description of the Lojban grammar holds true for Loglan as well. Most simple, declarative sentences could be translated word by word between the two languages; but the grammars differ in the details, and in their formal foundations. The grammar of Lojban is defined mostly in the language definition formalism Parsing Expression Grammar and YACC, with a few formal "pre-processing" rules. Loglan also has a machine grammar, but it is not definitive; it is based on a relatively small corpus of sentences that has remained unchanged through the decades, which takes precedence in case of a discrepancy.

The baselining of Lojban grammar may give it an advantage compared to Loglan in applying the language to practical uses.

== Terminology ==
There are also many differences in the terminology used in English to talk about the two languages. In his writings, Brown used many terms based on English, Latin and Greek, some of which were already established with a slightly different meaning. On the other hand, the Lojban camp freely borrowed grammatical terms from Lojban itself. For example, what linguists call roots or root words, Loglanists call primitives or prims, and Lojbanists call gismu. The lexeme of Loglan and selma'o of Lojban have nothing to do with the linguistic meaning of lexeme. It is a kind of part of speech, a subdivision of the set of grammatical words, or particles, which loglanists call little words and lojbanists cmavo. Loglan and Lojban have a grammatical construct called metaphor and tanru, respectively; this is not really a metaphor, but a kind of modifier-modificand relationship, similar to that of a noun adjunct and noun. A borrowed word in Loglan is simply called a borrowing; but in English discussions of Lojban, the Lojban word fu'ivla is used. This is probably because in Lojban, unlike Loglan, a certain set of CV templates is reserved for borrowed words.

== Phonology ==
In the new phonology for Lojban, the consonant q and the vowel w were removed, and the consonant h was replaced by x. The consonant ' (apostrophe) was added with the value of [h] in the International Phonetic Alphabet, but its distribution is such that it can appear only intervocally, and in discussions of the morphology and phonotactics, it is described not as a proper consonant, but a "voiceless glide". (This phoneme is realized as [θ] by some speakers.) A rigid phonotactical system was made for Lojban, but Loglan does not seem to have had such a system.
