= Faith Rich =

Faith Rich (born Faith Baldwin) (1909–1990) was a grass roots community activist, an educator and a supporter of the Civil Rights Movement. She was born to a farming family in Vermont in 1909. She received her doctoral degree in Classics from Bryn Mawr College in Pennsylvania in 1934, despite the College’s opposition to her radicalism. She married Theodore Rich, or Ted, and they moved to Chicago in the mid 1930s and began her work in activism and public service.

== NAACP and community involvement ==
While working with the International Ladies’ Garment Workers Union in Chicago, Rich became involved with numerous community improvement organizations, primarily in the city’s West Side neighborhood of North Lawndale. Rich’s involvement with the Westside Chicago Branch of National Association for the Advancement of Colored People (NAACP) began in 1945 and lasted until her death in 1990. There she served as Education Chairman, focusing her work on desegregating Chicago Public Schools and instituting an intensive phonetic program to the city’s reading curriculum. She served on the NAACP Textbook Committee, revising school textbooks to remove bias and better reflect contributions made by African Americans, Catholics, Jews and other groups. In addition to her work with the NAACP, Rich was an activist in the West Side community. She served as a member of the Illinois Parent Teacher Association (PTA), the George W. Collins High School’s Local School Council (LSC) and the 15th Place Block Club. Rich was also interested in how urban renewal, both at the city level and the community level, could affect urban life and socioeconomic opportunity.

== Loglan ==
The Loglan Institute developed and promoted an artificial, logical human language called Loglan, first introduced by James Cooke Brown in 1955. Faith Rich served as “Cerpeu of La Purmao Diigru” for the Loglan Institute, a title that roughly translates to Chairperson of the Word Creation Committee. She was also interested in the language as it related to linguistics and education in general, a lifelong interest of hers.

== Later life ==
Throughout her adult life Rich was employed as a temporary office worker, which allowed her flexibility to set her own schedule. She gained a teaching certificate in education but preferred to work as a substitute teacher or tutor for the same reason. She continued working with the NAACP, George W. Collins Local School Council and the 15th Place Block Club until the end of her life.

Faith Rich was diagnosed with thyroiditis in 1981. She died on March 12, 1990.

== Archival collection ==
The Faith Rich Papers were processed by the Black Metropolis Research Consortium's Behind the Color Curtain processing project in the spring of 2013. The papers are available at the Chicago Public Library Special Collections located in the Harold Washington Library Center.
