= Lojban grammar =

Grammar of the Lojban language

The grammar of Lojban is based on predicate logic. The majority of the grammar is borrowed from the prior "logical language" Loglan, and some of its features come from Láadan. The characteristic regularity, unambiguity, and versatility of Lojban grammar owes much to modern linguistics and computer programming—resources that were unavailable to the designers of earlier languages. Lojbanist Bob LeChevalier summarized one advantage of Lojban grammar as follows: "Lojban moves beyond the restrictions of European grammar. It overtly incorporates linguistic universals, building in what is needed to support the expressivity of the whole variety of natural languages, including non-European ones."

== Formal grammars ==
Lojban texts can be parsed just as texts in programming languages are by using formal grammars such as PEG, YACC, Backus–Naur form. There are several parsers available.

== Phonology ==
Lojban has 6 vowels and 21 consonants. The phonemes are commensurate with graphemes, which means Lojban has 27 letters (lerfu) each corresponding to a unique phoneme. Lojbanic graphemes can vary in mode; this article employs the Latin alphabet version, which is currently in the most common usage (see Orthography for more detail). The phonemes, on the other hand, are defined solely according to the International Phonetic Alphabet.

The tables below show typical realizations of sounds and the Latin alphabets in Lojban. In all cases except the rhotic consonant the first phoneme represents the preferred pronunciation, while the rest are the permitted variants intended to cover dissimilitude in pronunciation by speakers of different linguistic backgrounds.

=== Basic sounds ===
Note that simple vowel graphemes are never diphthongized like in English. Diphthongs are always written with two vowel graphemes.

	Phoneme	Latinate grapheme	English pronunciation example
vowels
open vowel	a (ɑ)	a	as in father
front mid vowel	ɛ (e)	e	as in bet
front close vowel	i	i	as in machine
back mid vowel	o (ɔ)	o	as in open
back close vowel	u	u	as in moon
central mid vowel	ə	y	as in sofa
fricatives
unvoiced labial fricative	f (ɸ)	f	as in fan
voiced labial fricative	v (β)	v	as in van
unvoiced velar fricative	x	x	as in the Scottish loch, or the German Bach
unvoiced glottal spirant	h	'	as in hat
sibilants
unvoiced alveolar sibilant	s	s	as in sing
voiced alveolar sibilant	z	z	as in zero
unvoiced coronal sibilant	ʃ (ʂ)	c	as in shoe
voiced coronal sibilant	ʒ (ʐ)	j	as in vision
stops
unvoiced bilabial stop	p	p	as in pip
voiced bilabial stop	b	b	as in bib
unvoiced alveolar stop	t	t	as in tap
voiced alveolar stop	d	d	as in dance
unvoiced velar stop	k	k	as in kink
voiced velar stop	ɡ	g	as in girl, not as in gym
glottal stop	ʔ	.	as in uh-oh
approximants
voiced labio-velar approximant	w	u-	as in winter
palatal approximant	j	i-	as in you
voiced lateral approximant	l (l̩)	l	as in luck
nasals
voiced labial nasal	m (m̩)	m	as in minimum
voiced alveolar nasal	n (n̩, ŋ, ŋ̩̩)	n	as in noon
rhotic
rhotic consonant	r (ɹ, ɾ, ʀ, r̩, ɹ̩, ɾ̩, ʀ̩)	r	as in red; or as in Spanish pero or perro, or French rendez-vous

=== Diphthongs ===
Lojban has 16 diphthongs, vowels that change quality during their emission but always being single syllable nuclei like pure vowels. Unlike English and similarly to languages such as Spanish, diphthongs are not distinct phonemes by themselves but are analyzed as a combination of "semi-vowel + vowel" (or the inverse order). The combinations <ai>, <au>, <ei> and <oi>, for instance, are all realized as the corresponding falling diphthongs. Triphthongs exist as combinations of a rising and a falling diphthong, e.g. <iau>.

=== Allophones ===
The vowels can be either rounded or unrounded. The consonants can be either aspirated or unaspirated, although the voiceless stops /p/, /t/ and /k/ are usually aspirated to some degree. In general, consonants are not palatalized. The affricates /d͡ʒ/, /t͡ʃ/, /d͡z/, and /t͡s/ occur in Lojban (like in English jar, chair, fads, and cats.), but they are not distinct phonemes, contrary to English /d͡ʒ/ and /t͡ʃ/. Each is considered to be a combination of an appropriate stop and fricative phoneme: the sequences <dj>, <tc>, <dz> and <ts>, respectively. The rhotic sounds are all equally acceptable as an identical phoneme. ⟨l⟩, ⟨m⟩, ⟨n⟩, and ⟨r⟩ may be syllabic.

=== Buffering of consonant clusters ===
For those who, given their native language background, may have trouble pronouncing (certain) consonant clusters, there is the option of inserting buffer vowels between them, as long as they differ sufficiently from the phonological vowels and are pronounced as short as possible. This mechanism can be described as a form of anaptyxis (vocalic epenthesis). Possible choices include [ɪ] , [ɨ], [ʊ] and [ʏ] (but not [y], which is the rounded counterpart of [i] and thus a valid realization of /i/). The resulting added syllables are completely ignored by the grammar, including for the purposes of stress determination.

== Orthography ==
Lojban may be written in different orthography systems as long as it meets the required regularities and unambiguities. Some of the reasons for such elasticity would be as follows:

1. Lojban is rather defined by the phonemes (spoken form of words), therefore, as long as they are correctly rendered so as to maintain the Lojbanic audio-visual isomorphism, a representational system can be said to be an appropriate orthography of the language;
2. Lojban is meant to be as culturally neutral as possible, so it is never crucial or fundamental to claim that some particular orthography of some particular languages (e.g. the Latin alphabet) should be the dominant mode.

Lojbanist Kena extends this principle to argue that even an original orthography of the language is to be sought.

=== Latin/Roman mode ===
Lojban's Latin alphabet consists of 23 lerfu a b c d e f g i j k l m n o p r s t u v x y z plus 3 semi-lerfu ' , . which are used. They are intentionally ordered in accordance with that of ASCII characters.

Capitalization may be applied to mark a non-standard stressed syllable as in cmevla, but they are not considered separate lerfu. Whether a single vowel or the entire syllable is capitalized is a matter of preference; for example, the name "Josephine" can be rendered as either DJOzefin. or djOzefin. (without the capitalization, the ordinary rules of Lojban stress will cause the 'ze' syllable to be stressed instead).

Punctuation marks are not mandatory; such notions as question or exclamation are expressed with words rather than unpronounced symbols.

=== Cyrillic mode ===
This mode was conceived when the introductory Lojban brochure was translated into Russian. 23 lerfu а б в г д е ж з и к л м н о п р с т у ф х ш ъ plus 3 semi-lerfu ', . are used. The hard sign ъ is assigned to the open-mid vowel (as in Bulgarian). Diphthongs are written as vowel pairs, as in the Roman mode.

=== Tengwar mode ===
Kena argues for writing Lojban using Tengwar, arguing that:

1. the Latin alphabet is too strongly related to Western civilizations, and thus probably introduces some kind of cultural bias in Lojban. Lojban wants to be both logical and culturally neutral, the Tengwar already are;
2. the Tengwar system inherently contains some main Lojban morphology rules, making Lojban easier to learn when it is written with Tengwar.

Advocates of this mode include Eric S. Raymond.

=== Zbalermorna mode ===
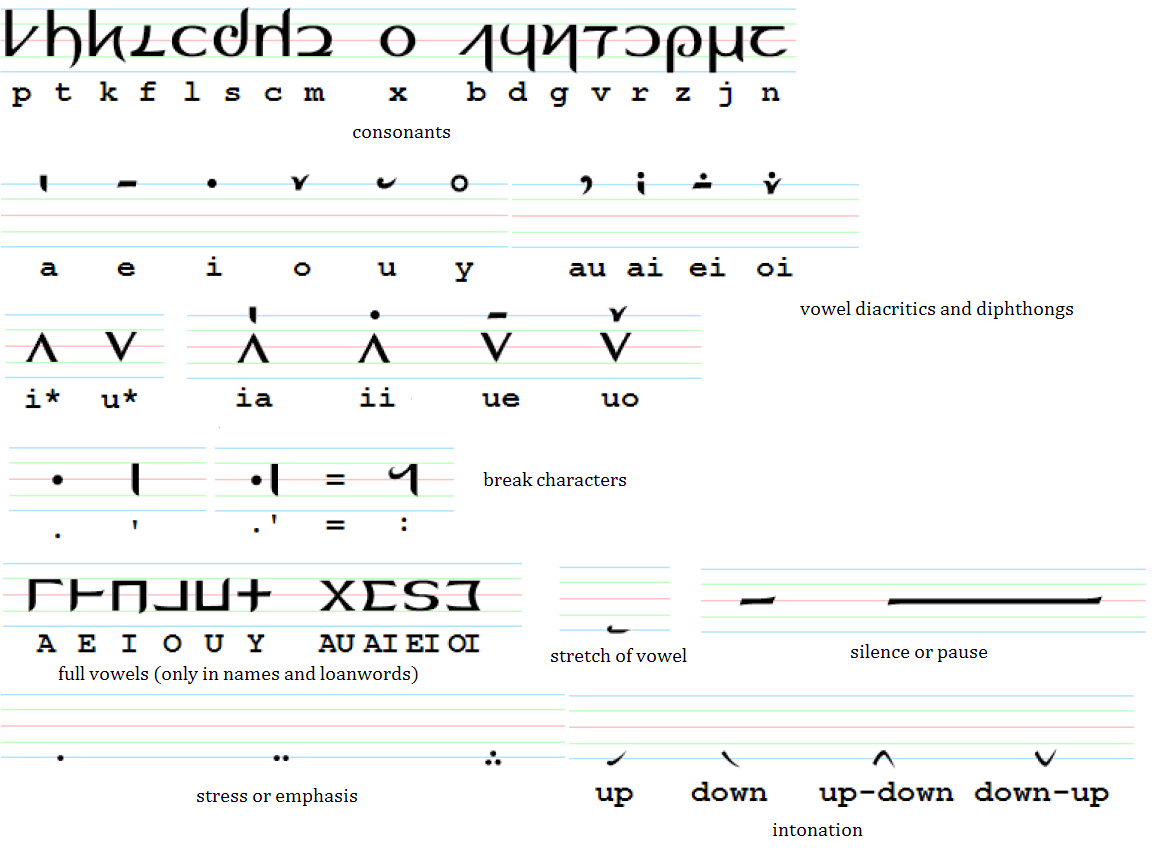
Zbalermorna alphabet table

Deaf Autistic. Please Be Patient

Another option for cultural neutrality is zbalermorna, an abugida created by la kmir. It is designed with handwriting in mind. The word zbalermorna is a combination of zbasu (build), lerfu (letter), and morna (pattern).

Much like in the Shavian alphabet, the voiced consonant is written with a rotated version of the glyph used to write the voiceless consonant. Common design elements are used for different types of consonants, i.e. plosives, both sibilant and non-sibilant fricatives, liquids, and nasals. Since x doesn't have a voiced or voiceless counterpart, it is written with a circle.

Vowels are written as diacritics applied to consonants. Semivowels i and u use their own separate consonant glyphs, while the other allowed diphthongs, au, ai, ei, and oi, use their own diacritics. This script also has a separate system for vowels and the aforementioned diphthongs for use in names and foreign words to make them stand out. Because diphthongs get their own letters, this system also removes the need for a slaka bu.

The .y'y and denpa bu are written with the same symbols as the Latin script. The pattern of .C'C can be written with the two symbols merged, allowing attitudinals to be written more naturally.

The design also allows .i, the most common cmavo in Lojban, to be written with just two dots, akin to a colon.

=== Japanese mode ===
A Japanese hiragana version of Lojban orthography has been proposed, in which case more than 80 lerfu may be used. This mode is not without certain technical issues since the hiragana (and katakana too) are always syllabic, indicating an open syllable (with the exception of the final "n" sound), requiring some special attention when representing the Lojbanic consonant clusters. Several example haiku compositions in the orthography have been created.

== Morphology ==
Lojban has 3 word-classes: brivla (verbs or predicate words), cmavo (structure words), and cmevla (name words). Each of them has uniquely identifying morphological properties, so that one can unambiguously recognize which word is of which part of speech in a string of the language. They may be further divided in sub-classes (discussed respectively below).

There also exist affixes (rafsi) assigned to some of the brivla and cmavo.

=== brivla – verbs ===
brivla carry the content (semantic information) of an expression. The bare brivla corresponds to the verb in English. Additional words can be used to transform it into what corresponds to English common nouns, adjectives, or adverbs (although some modal cmavo too may have adverbial purposes). Brivla may be identified by the following morphological properties:

- Have more than one syllable
- Are penultimately stressed
- Have a consonant cluster (at least two adjacent consonants) in the first 5 lerfu including the second consonant
- Start with a consonant (except some fu'ivla)
- End with a vowel

A word such as lobypei will still be considered as a brivla because the special gluing vowel y between b and p is to be ignored and therefore a consonant cluster (b-p) assumes its existence within it.

Unlike verbs in English, brivla do not inflect for tense, person, or number.

Brivla's sub-classes are as follows, with some examples.

==== gismu – core verbs ====
The brivla which constitute the lexical core of the language are called gismu. They are invariably five-letter words, which distinguishes it from the other types of brivla, and are in a form of either CVCCV or CCVCV (C stands for a consonant and V for a vowel). Being two syllables means that the general rule of brivla to be stressed penultimately will always cause the first syllable of a gismu to be stressed.

viska (CVCCV)

prami (CCVCV)

They have been chosen or added as root words because they

- represent concepts that are very familiar and basic,
- represent concepts the usage of which is equally frequent among different languages,
- would be helpful in constructing more complex words, or
- represent fundamental grammatical concepts of Lojban.

The main source languages from which they were drawn are Arabic, Chinese, English, Hindi, Russian, and Spanish. Here is further explanation of the nature of gismu by Cowan:

The gismu do not represent any sort of systematic partitioning of semantic space. Some gismu may be superfluous, or appear for historical reasons: the gismu list was being collected for almost 35 years and was only weeded out once. Instead, the intention is that the gismu blanket semantic space: they make it possible to talk about the entire range of human concerns. [...] For a given concept, words in the six languages that represent that concept were written in Lojban phonetics. Then a gismu was selected to maximize the recognizability of the Lojban word for speakers of the six languages by weighting the inclusion of the sounds drawn from each language by the number of speakers of that language.

The Complete Lojban Language: 4.4

According to Robin Turner, the creation was algorithmically done by computer.

Approximately 1350 gismu exist, which is a relatively small number when compared to that of English words ranging from 450,000 up to 1,000,000. Theoretically, by learning only these root words, as well as their fragmental forms and some major structure words (cmavo), one will be able to communicate effectively in Lojban.

==== lujvo – verbs made of affixes ====
The form of brivla made of affixes (rafsi) is called lujvo.

pazvau – pregnant (paz (an affix from panzi, offspring) + vau (an affix from vasru, containing))

bavlamdei – tomorrow (bav (from balvi, future) + lam (from lamji, adjacent) + dei (from djedi, a day in duration))

seljgi – object of pride (sel (an affix from the particle se) + jgi (an affix from jgira, pride))

==== fu'ivla – borrowed verbs, loan words ====
fu'ivla usually refers to things that are culture-specific (including Lojban culture) or to kinds of plants or animals, concepts which cannot be easily expressed as mere modifying-modified combinations of Lojban's internal root verbs (gismu).

fu'ivla can be subdivided into four types according to the extent to which they are modified, namely Stage 1, 2, 3, and 4 fu'ivla.

===== Stage 1 fu'ivla =====
The longest form, quoting a foreign word/phrase while preserving its original spelling with particular structure words.

me la'o ly. spaghetti ly.
(la'o indicates that a non-lojbanic text follows. ly. are delimiters of that foreign text. And me turns the whole sequence into a selbri so that the word/phrase can form a bridi with its given place structure. In this example, "x1 is a quantity of spaghetti" is a possible place structure.)

- A "hybrid" stage sometimes is enlisted. In this case, it would take the above sentence but Lojbanize "spaghetti" to be phonetic to a (native) Lojban without changing the ending. Therefore, stage "1.5" fu'ivla for "spaghetti" is "me la'o ly. spageti ly."

===== Stage 2 fu'ivla =====
This stage involves lojbanizing the sound and spelling of the word.

me la .spagetis.
(me is still needed since la spagetis. cannot by itself work as a brivla.)

===== Stage 3 fu'ivla =====
At this stage a borrowed word is fully turned into a single brivla, having its own place structure. Since no brivla may have more than one meaning, it is often the case that they are attached by a rafsi (with a hyphen like "-r-", "-n-", or "-l-") categorizing or limiting the semantic scope of the word (such are called "rafsi classifier"). Again they always start with a consonant and end with a vowel.

cidjrspageti (using longer rafsi: cidj + r + "spaghetti", using cidja, food)

djarspageti (using shorter rafsi: dja + r + "spaghetti", using a rafsi of cidja)

zgikrtekno (zgike (music) + "techno")

runrxorigami (rutni (artifact) + "origami")

===== Stage 4 fu'ivla =====
These are the borrowings which are so common or so important that have become as short as possible, having no rafsi classifier. Unlike other brivla, they may begin with a vowel (preceded by a pause mark separating it from the previous word). Also the word must not be of a form that one can remove all the initial vowels (and apostrophes) and have a valid word.

skalduna ("Basque" from "euskaldun")
frangula ("buckthorn" from a species name)
vombatu ("wombat")
.alba'aka ("basil" from Spanish)

==== lujvo with components made of fu'ivla ====
It is possible to absorb a fu'ivla into a lujvo, with principles varying among Lojbanists. Notable proponents are Pierre Abbat and Jorge Llambías. Here are some comparisons of their methods drawn from the Lojban mailing list (as of July 2007):

me'andi (henna, from Gujarati mehandi) + skari (colour)
me'andyska (Abbat)
me'andi'yska (Llambías)

gurnrtefi (teff) + nanba (bread)
gurnrtefynanba (Abbat)
gurnrtefi'ynanba (Llambías)

mikri (one millionth, micro-) + enri (henry)
mikryenri (Abbat)
mikri'yenri (Llambías)

=== cmavo – particles, structure words ===
Lojban particles, cmavo, are recognized by following morphological properties:

- may be a single syllable
- never contain a consonant cluster of any type, whether or not y is counted
- end in a vowel
- need not be penultimately stressed, though they often are if they have more than one syllable

They can be of any form permitted by these rules, including without an initial consonant. The form generally does not indicate anything about its grammatical function.

cmavo can be sequenced without spaces and without any change to its meaning:

pa re ci (123) = pareci (123)

se pi'o (using ...) = sepi'o (using ...)

As far as the stress rules of Lojban are concerned, such compound cmavo are still separate words, so penultimate stress (e.g. paREci) is not obligatory.

Some cmavo have rafsi, which may help converting tanru (sequence of brivla) into lujvo:

ve detri --> veldetri ("calendar", from fourth slot of detri, date)

se ke cpacu djica --> selkemcpadji (roughly "what someone wants to get", from cpacu, get, and djica, desire)

==== selma'o ====
All cmavo are grouped into grammatical classes, called selma'o (from se + cmavo). Cmavo are categorized into selma'o by their meaning, e.g. su'i, equivalent to the addition operator, is in selma'o VUhU, along with subtraction, exponent, logarithm, and many other mathematical operators.

Furthermore, selma'o can be split into sub-selma'o based on minor differences in meaning. For example, both emotional indicators and evidentials are classed as attitudinals, in selma'o UI, but the former is placed into UI1 and the latter into UI2.

In English, selma'o names cannot change and are written in Latin script, in all-caps except .y'y, transcribed as 'h'.

In Lojban, however, selma'o can be referred to by any member of said selma'o prefixed by the cmavo "ma'oi".

=== cmevla – name words ===
cmevla are mostly used for names of things (including people) in descriptions or in direct address (cf. proper nouns). They can be in any form as long as they end in a consonant. The practice by which names in natural languages are modified to be used in Lojban is known as "lojbanization".

la .bionses.nolz., (a possible realization of the name "Beyoncé Knowles")

=== rafsi – affixes (suffixes, infixes, prefixes) ===
A special building block, from which a new lujvo may be created, is called rafsi. Rafsi are bound to certain gismu, cmavo or fu'ivla. This also means that lujvo have no rafsi form of their own. Rafsi cannot by themselves function as an individual words; they only form lujvo when at least two are joined together.

solri (original gismu for "sun"): sol, solr, solri (assigned rafsi): solxrula (derivative lujvo, "sunflower")

ke (original cmavo): kem (assigned rafsi): selkemcpadji (derivative lujvo, "what someone wants to get")

sam, pli (component rafsi, from skami (computer) and pilno (use) respectively): sampli (derivative lujvo, "computer user")

The unambiguity of Lojban morphology, according to John Woldemar Cowan, gives rise to "significant clues to the meaning and the origin of the word, even if you have never heard the word before". He further says: "The same principle allows you, when speaking or writing, to invent new brivla for new concepts 'on the fly'; yet it offers people that you are trying to communicate with a good chance to figure out your meaning. In this way, Lojban has a flexible vocabulary which can be expanded indefinitely."

== Syntax and semantics ==
According to What Is Lojban?, the language's grammatical structures are "defined by a set of rules that have been tested to be unambiguous using computers", which is called the "machine grammar". Hence the characteristics of the standard syntactic (not semantic) constructs in Lojban:

- each word has exactly one grammatical interpretation;
- the words relate grammatically to each other in exactly one way.

Such standards, however, are to be attained with certain carefulness:

new Lojbanists will not be able to speak 'perfectly' when first learning Lojban. In fact, you may never speak perfectly in 'natural' Lojban conversation, even though you achieve fluency in the language. No English speaker always speaks textbook English in natural conversation; Lojban speakers will also make grammatical errors when talking quickly. Lojbanists will, however, be able to speak or write unambiguously if they are careful, which is difficult if not impossible with a natural language.

Nick Nicholas and John Cowan. What Is Lojban? II.3

The computer-tested, unambiguous rules also include grammar for 'incomplete' sentences e.g. for narrative, quotational, or mathematical phrases.

Lojbanic expressions are modular; smaller constructs of words are assembled into larger phrases so that all incorporating pieces manifest as a possible grammatical unity. This mechanism allows for simplistic yet infinitely powerful phrasings; "a more complex phrase can be placed inside a simple structure, which in turn can be used in another instance of the complex phrase structure".

=== bridi – clauses, predications ===
Being derived from predicate logic, the basic unit of Lojban expression is predication, a claim that some objects stand in some relationship, or that some single object has some property. In Lojban they are expressed using clauses (bridi). Just as a predication is formed by a predicate and arguments in formal logic, bridi are formed by selbri and sumti in Lojban. In linguistic terms selbri is the predicate of a clause, and sumti are its arguments. A construct of selbri and sumti produces a claim that something stands in a specified relationship to something else or has a specified property.

do | viska | mi
(Two sumti and one selbri, making up one bridi, claiming that a relation viska (x1 sees x2) exists between do (you) and mi (me). The selbri does not have to be literally between sumti. The example can also be rendered as do mi viska. A more detailed discussion on Lojban word order below.)

Multiple bridi can be either sequenced across multiple sentences or compounded in one sentence:

do | melbi | .i | do | xendo
You are beautiful. You are kind.
(Two sentences, each consisting of one sumti and one selbri. .i separates sentences.)

do | melbi | .ije | do | xendo
You are beautiful and you are kind.
(This sentence is syntactically identical to the last one but differs in meaning. .ije may be spelled as .i je.)

do | melbi | gi'e | xendo
You are beautiful and kind.
(One sentence, consisting of one sumti and two selbri. gi'e separates bridi as well as compounding them.)

do | melbi | gi'e | xendo | .iki'ubo | mi | nelci | do
You are beautiful and kind. Because of that, I am fond of you.
(Two sentences, one of which includes compound bridi. While .i simply marks a division of sentences, ki'u together with bo adds that there is a particular logical connection between the first and second sentence. .iki'ubo may be spelled as .i ki'u bo.)

A compound bridi can include multiple tenses and sumti:

mi | puze'u gunka | gi'e | ca tatpi
I | for a long interval some time in the past, worked | and | now, am tired
I worked (for a long time) and I'm now tired.

mi | ca'o klama | ta | ti | fu le karce | gi'e | ba tavla | do | la .lojban.
I | continuing/during, come | (to) there | (from) here | using the car | and | after, talk | (to) you
I'll keep driving the car from here to there, and I will talk to you after.

The implicit grammatical divisions can be made explicit by separator words such as cu and vau, which are often elidable but sometimes need to be present to avoid ambiguity:

le nixli cu melbi
(This instance shows that the left-hand gismu is sumti ("the girl") and the right-hand gismu is selbri ("is beautiful"). Without cu the two gismu would be grammatically undistinguishable.)

mi dunda le cukta gi'e lebna lo rupnu vau do
(vau indicates that the two bridi, dunda le cukta ("give the book (to)") and lebna lo rupnu ("take the dollars (from)"), sharing the same first sumti mi, together terminate at that position, enabling them to have the subsequent do as their mutual second sumti. Compare it with its longer equivalent: mi dunda le cukta do .ije mi lebna lo rupnu do ("I give the book to you and take the money from you").)

The places of cu and vau in the previous examples can be rendered as follows:

do (cu) viska le nixli (vau)

do (cu) melbi (vau) .i do (cu) xendo (vau)

do (cu) melbi (vau) gi'e xendo (vau) (vau)
(The last vau marks the mutual termination of the two bridi.)

do (cu) melbi (vau) gi'e xendo (vau) (vau) .i do (cu) xendo (vau)

The ordered sets of sumti assigned to every selbri are known as "place structures". They are explicitly defined in dictionaries or word lists.

mi | tavla | do | la .lojban. | le glibau
(Two sumti mi and do are fitting into the place structure of the selbri tavla, which is "x1 talks/speaks to x2 about subject x3 in language x4".)

Some lujvo formations usually operate on the place structure in predictable ways. The rafsi gau, for instance, inserts one place for the agent and pushes all others down one. Thus brivla can have indefinitely many places. This contrasts with the accusative alignment or ergative alignment that most languages have, in which there is a small number of named places (subject, direct object, indirect object) and all others are expressed by prepositions.

The word order in Lojban is basically free. All the following sentences mean "I love you", differing only in word order:

mi | prami | do (SVO)
mi | do | prami (SOV)
do | se prami | mi (OVS)
do | mi | se prami (OSV)
prami | fa mi | do (VSO)
prami | fe do | fa mi (VOS)

Such flexibility has to do with the language's intended capability to translate as many expressions of natural languages as possible, based on a unique positional case system. The meaning of the sentence mi prami do is determined by prami realizing, with its own predefined place structure, a specific semantic relation between mi and do; when the positional relation between mi and do changes, the meaning of the sentence changes too. As shown above, Lojban has particular devices to preserve such semantic structure of words while altering their order. Compare the followings:

mi | tavla | do | la .lojban. | le glibau ( 1 | selbri | 2 | 3 | 4 )
"x1 (mi, I) talks/speaks to x2 (do, you) about subject x3 (la lojban., Lojban) in language x4 (le glibau, English)"

do | se tavla | mi | fo le glibau | fi la .lojban. ( 2 | selbri | 1 | 4 | 3 )
"x2 (do) is talked/spoken to by x1 (mi) in language x4 (le glibau) about subject x3 (la lojban.)"

se converts the x1 and x2 sumti place. fo tags the x4 place, and fi the x3. Such conversion and tagging is often used to emphasize particular sumti by bringing it forward.

Here are some collations of natural languages and Lojban:

Labhraíonn Mícheál Gaeilge le Cáit (VSO – Irish)
speaks | Mícheál | Irish | with Cáit
tavla fa la .mixal. fo la sicko'o fe la .kat.
speaks | Mícheál | in Irish | to/with Cáit

Mamaky boky ny mpianatra (VOS – Malagasy)
reads | book | the student
tcidu lo cukta fa le tadni
reads | a book | the student

Âi ba, wa mo. (OSV – Xavante)
to the-river | I | go
fe le rirxe fa mi klama
to the river | I | go

Ihtébani o'ílaci yawi-pó=ra (OVS – Guarijio)
Esteban house-at | dance-[passive].[future]=[reportative]
ti'e bu'u le zdani be la .esteban. ba nu dansu
[I hear!] at the house of Esteban | [future] event-of dance

僕がこれを作ったんだよ。 (SOV – Japanese)
I | this | made-[assertive-calling]
mi ti pu zbasu vau je'uju'i
I | this | [past] make [bridi-terminator] [truth-attention]

Lojban selbri is not a real equivalent of verb in natural languages. A selbri can be either a verb, a noun, an adjective, or an adverb. Its function is determined syntactically, not morphologically. An analogy to natural language word orders by using such terms as "subject", "verb", and "object" cannot accurately describe the nature of Lojban bridi.

=== sumti – arguments of predicates ===
There are five kinds of simple sumti:

1. descriptions, which usually begin with a descriptor such as le or more commonly now lo;
2. pro-sumti, the Lojban analogue of pronouns, such as mi;
3. names, which usually begin with la, such as la .lojban.;
4. quotations, which begin with lu, lo'u, zo, zoi;
5. pure numbers, which usually begin with li.

==== description ====
Basic descriptions in Lojban consist of two units, LE/LA descriptors and a selbri:

le zarci

Although le is quite close in meaning to English "the", it has particularly unique implications. In this example, le creates an argument which might occur in the x1 place of the belonging selbri zarci, namely a "market". le also specifies that the speaker 1) has one or more specific markets in mind (whether or not the listener knows which ones they are) and 2) is merely describing the things he/she has in mind as markets, without being committed to the truth of that description. Whereas English-speakers must differentiate between "the market" and "the markets", Lojban-speakers are not required to make such a choice (this rule does not mean that Lojban has no way of specifying the number of markets in such a case):

le zarci cu barda
The market is big. / The markets are big.

Since the construct le + selbri merely describes something or other which the speaker chooses to represent based on his/her observation, such an expression as follows is possible:

le nanmu cu ninmu
one-or-more-specific-things-which-I-describe as "men" are women

While le is specific, lo is not:

lo zarci cu barda
one-or-more-of-all-the-things-which-really are-markets is/are-big
A market is big. / Some markets are big.

lo refers generally to one or more markets, without being specific about which. Unlike le zarci, lo zarci must refer to something which actually is a market (that is, which can appear in the x1 place of a truthful bridi whose selbri is zarci). lo morsi cu jmive is false as there are no objects in the real world which are both dead and alive.

la dissociates the subsequent selbri from its normal meaning, usually making a name (this usage should not be confused with the other usage before regular Lojbanized names). Like le descriptions, la descriptions are implicitly restricted to those the speaker has in mind:

la cribe pu finti le lisri
the-one-named "bear" [past] creates the story.
Bear wrote the story.

All descriptions implicitly terminate with ku, which can almost always be omitted with no danger of ambiguity. The main exceptions are a) when relative clauses are involved and b) when a description immediately precedes the selbri (in which case using an explicit cu before the selbri makes the ku unnecessary). Other usages of ku include making a compound negator (naku) and terminating place-structure/tense/modal tags (puku, baiku).

=== selbri – main verbs of clauses, logical predicates ===
The selbri is the logical predicate of a bridi. This is not to be confused with the meaning of predicate in terms of the English Language, but as a logical predicate. Whereas a predicate in English contains everything that the subject is doing, a logical predicate is simply the relation between all involved parties. In this context, the selbri is roughly the equivalent of a verb in English. For instance:

mi nelci le gerku
I like the dog. / I like the dogs.

The gismu nelci is being used as the selbri in this bridi. It is describing the relationship between the sumtis mi (I) and le gerku (the dog). The relationship is that of a liker and that which is liked. The roles in the relationship are determined by the sumti placements inherent in the word being used as the selbri. The cmavo se/te/ve/xe are used to swap the first sumti placement of the selbri with the second, third, fourth, and fifth sumti placement, respectively. This functionality allows for the flexibility in bridi. For instance, the gismu klama has the sumti of:

- x1: One which goes
- x2: The destination of a goer
- x3: The source of a goer
- x4: The route taken by a goer
- x5: The vehicle used by a goer

Thus:

ti klama ta

x1 = ti
x2 = ta

This goes to that.

ti se klama ta

x2 = ti
x1 = ta

This is the destination of that.

ti te klama ta

x3 = ti
x2 = ta

This is the source of something that goes to that.

ti ve klama ta

x4 = ti
x2 = ta

This is the route of something that goes to that.

ti xe klama ta

x5 = ti
x2 = ta

This is the vehicle of something that goes to that.

Selbri can also be tanru, where the sumti placements are determined by the last brivla that is part of the tanru. For instance:

mi gleki klama ta
I am a happy-goer that is going to that.

mi klama gleki ta
I am a going-happy-thing that is happy about that.

==== tanru – compound verbs ====
A group of two or more selbri put one after another is called tanru and acts as a single selbri (while the selbri it is composed of are called tanru units (selbrisle)). They correspond to English compound verbs like drip fry or drip dry.

Tanru can be converted to sumti as usual selbri.

Tanru may be used so as to more specifically conceptualize the intended meaning. In lo skami pilno ("computer user(s)"), there is a tanru skami pilno where the modifying brivla skami narrows the sense of the modified brivla pilno to form a more specific concept (in which case the modifier may resemble English adverbs or adjectives). Without skami, lo pilno will just mean "user". Other examples:

ti mutce xajmi ("This is very funny.")

do melbi se kanla ("You have beautiful eye(s).")

.ue.oi le mabla bebna cu zvati ti ("Oh my gosh the damn idiot is here.")

Arguments of selbri representing tanru units may be filled as well, in which case they are attached using the particle be (starting from x2 place of the tanru unit):

ti melbi be mi ractu ("This is a pretty to me rabbit.")

=== cmavo ===
The cmavo consist of various particles and structure words. These include descriptors, connectives, attitudinals, prepositions, and tense words.

==== Descriptors ====
There are five descriptors (gadri in Lojban): lo, le, la, li, and me'o; of which the first three inflect to show individual, mass, or set (though as far as the formal grammar is concerned, the inflected forms are separate words, not inflected forms).

	Individual	Mass	Set	Typical
Indefinite	lo	loi	lo'i	lo'e
Definite	le	lei	le'i	le'e
Name	la	lai	la'i	–
Number	li	–	–	–
Mathematical expression	me'o	–	–	–

The individual/mass distinction is similar to the distinction between mass nouns and count nouns, but things that are normally counted can be considered as a mass. The set articles consider the mathematical set of the referents.

lo'i jurme bene'i mi cu bramau lo'i mi mivysle ("The set of bacteria inside me is bigger than the set of my cells." With loi this would be false, as the bacteria, though more in number, have less mass.)

lo mi kerfa cu jdari .iku'i loi mi kerfa cu ranti ("My hairs are hard, but my hair is soft.")

The number and mathematical expression articles are used when talking about numbers and numerals or letters as themselves.

bi jgena ("eight knots")

lo me li bi jgena ("an eight knot", whatever that is; perhaps it has eight loops)

lo me me'o bi jgena ("a figure-eight knot")

Note that gadri are sometimes called articles, which doesn't correspond to the usual notion of articles in linguistics.

==== Connectives ====
As befits a logical language, there is a large assortment of conjunctions.

There exist 16 possible different binary truth functions, the four fundamental ones of which are assigned four vowels in Lojban. These vowels are a component sound from which actual logical-connective cmavo are built up.

A	FIRST is true and/or SECOND is true (TTTF)
E	FIRST is true and SECOND is true (TFFF)
O	FIRST is true if and only if SECOND is true (TFFT)
U	FIRST is true whether or not SECOND is true (TTFF)

la .djekl. .a la .xaid. zvati ti
Jekyll and/or Hyde is/are here.

la .djekl. .e la .xaid. zvati ti
Jekyll and Hyde is here.

la .djekl. .o la .xaid. zvati ti
Jekyll if-and-only-if Hyde is here.

la .djekl. .u la .xaid. zvati ti
Jekyll whether-or-not Hyde is here.

With the four vowels, the ability to negate either sentence (with na or nai), and the ability to exchange the sentences, as if their order had been reversed (with se), Lojban can create all of the 16 possible truth functions except TTTT and FFFF.

	Original form	Negating first	Negating second	Negating both
A	(A) .a (B)	(A) na.a (B)	(A) .anai (B)	(A) na.anai (B)
A	$A \lor B$	$\neg A \lor B$ $A \rightarrow B$	$A \lor \neg B$ $A \leftarrow B$	$\neg A \lor \neg B$ $A \uparrow B$
A	A or B	If A, then B	A if B	A NAND B A or B, not both
E	(A) .e (B)	(A) na.e (B)	(A) .enai (B)	(A) na.enai (B)
E	$A \wedge B$	$\neg A \wedge B$ $A \nleftarrow B$	$A \wedge \neg B$ $A \nrightarrow B$	$\neg A \wedge \neg B$ $A \downarrow B$
E	A and B	Not A but B	A but not B	Neither A nor B
O	(A) .o (B)	(A) na.o (B)	(A) .onai (B)	(A) na.onai (B)
O	$A \leftrightarrow B$	$\neg A \leftrightarrow B$ $A \oplus B$	$A \leftrightarrow \neg B$ $A \oplus B$	$\neg A \leftrightarrow \neg B$ $A \leftrightarrow B$
O	A if and only if B	A or B, not both	A or B, not both	A if and only if B
U	(A) .u (B)	(A) na.u (B)		
U	$A$	$\neg A$		
U	A, regardless of B	Not A, regardless of B		
U	(A) se.u (B)	(A) se.unai (B)		
U	$B$	$\neg B$		
U	Regardless of A, B	Regardless of A, not B		

.onai is preferred over na.o. Note that in se.unai, the negation occurs before "swapping" the positions of A and B. While se can be used for the other connectives, it is unnecessary since or, and, and if and only if have the same relationship if their inputs are swapped (i.e. they are commutative).

FFFT	(A) na.enai (B)	$A \downarrow B$	Neither A nor B
FFTF	(A) na.e (B)	$A \nleftarrow B$	Not A but B
FFTT	(A) na.u (B)	$\neg A$	Not A (regardless of B)
FTFF	(A) .enai (B)	$A \nrightarrow B$	A but not B
FTFT	(A) se.unai (B)	$\neg B$	(Regardless of A) Not B
FTTF	(A) .onai (B)	$A \oplus B$	A or B, not both
FTTT	(A) na.anai (B)	$A \uparrow B$	A NAND B
TFFF	(A) .e (B)	$A \wedge B$	A and B
TFFT	(A) .o (B)	$A \leftrightarrow B$	A if and only if B
TFTF	(A) se.u (B)	$B$	(Regardless of A) B
TFTT	(A) na.a (B)	$A \rightarrow B$	If A then B
TTFF	(A) .u (B)	$A$	A (regardless of B)
TTFT	(A) .anai (B)	$A \leftarrow B$	A if B
TTTF	(A) .a (B)	$A \lor B$	A or B

la .djekl. na.a la .xaid. zvati ti
Jekyll only-if Hyde is here. / Jekyll is here only if Hyde is here

la .djekl. .enai la .xaid. zvati ti
Jekyll and-not Hyde is here. / Jekyll, but not Hyde, is here.

la .djekl. .onai la .xaid. zvati ti
Jekyll either/or Hyde is here. / Either Jekyll or Hyde is here, but not both.

la .djekl. se.u la .xaid. zvati ti
Regardless of Jekyll, Hyde is here. / Whether or not Jekyll is here, Hyde is.

In order to remain unambiguous, each place in the grammar of the language where logical connection is permitted has its appropriate set of connectives. If the connective suitable for sumti were used to connect selbri, ambiguity would result. Connections between components other than sumti can be expressed as follows (note that their functions are in accordance with the assigned vowels):

la .djekl. tavla .ija la .xaid. tavla (between sentences)
Jekyll speaks. And/or Hyde speaks.

la .djekl. mikce la xaid. gi'e nanmu (between bridi)
Jekyll is a doctor of Hyde and is a man.

la .djekl. sipna je cadzu (between gismu)
Jekyll sleeps-and-walks.

Negatives and se can be used with these connectives with similar forms.

la .djekl. tavla .ijanai la .xaid. tavla (between sentences)
Jekyll speaks. If Hyde speaks.

la .djekl. mikce nagi'e nanmu (between bridi)
Jekyll is a doctor but not a man.

la .djekl. sipna seju cadzu (between gismu)
Regardless as to whether Jekyll sleeps, he walks.

Connections can also be given using "forethought" forms

ge la .djekl. gi la .xaid. zvati ti
Jekyll and Hyde are here.

la .djekl. gu'e sipna gi cadzu
Jekyll sleeps-and-walks.

Negatives are created by adding nai to the connective before the negated construct.

genai la .djekl. gi la .xaid. zvati ti
Not Jekyll but Hyde is here.

ge la .djekl. ginai la .xaid. zvati ti
Jekyll but not Hyde is here.

Connections can be questioned:

la .djekl. ji la .xaid. tavla
Jekyll [what?] Hyde speaks.
Does Jekyll or Hyde speak?

la .djekl. sipna je'i cadzu
Jekyll sleeps [what?] walks.
Does Jekyll sleep or walk?

Besides the logical connectives, there are several non-logical connectives. These do not change form depending on what they are connecting:

(A) joi (B)	the mass with components A and B
(A) ce (B)	the set with elements A and B
(A) ce'o (B)	the sequence with elements A and B in order
(A) sece'o (B)	the sequence with elements B and A in order
(A) jo'u (B)	A and B considered jointly
(A) fa'u (B)	A and B respectively
(A) sefa'u (B)	B and A respectively
(A) jo'e (B)	the union of sets A and B
(A) ku'a (B)	the intersection of sets A and B
(A) pi'u (B)	the cross product of sets A and B
(A) sepi'u (B)	the cross product of sets B and A

lo lanme [ku] fa'u lo guzme cu danlu fa'u spati
Sheep and melons are animals and plants, respectively.

la .treid. ku'a la .traian. midju la .carlyt.
Trade intersect Tryon is the center of Charlotte.

lo rukygu'e cu xazdo joi ropno
Russia is Asian together with European.

The ku is required by the LALR parser, but not by the PEG parser, which however is not official yet.

==== Attitudinals ====
Attitudinals are a set of cmavo which allow the speakers to express their emotional state or source of knowledge, or the present stage of discourse. In natural languages, attitudes are expressed using interjections, but also by the tone of voice when speaking, and (very imperfectly) by punctuation when writing; in Lojban, such information are extensively expressible in words. And the meanings are to be understood separately from the main predicate.

.iu (love)

.ui (happy)

They may be "scaled" by suffixes:

.uinai (happy-not = unhappy)

.uicai (happy-intense = very very happy)

.uicu'i (happy-neutral)

Combination is possible, and highly productive as well as creative:

.uinaicai (happy-not-intense)

.iu.uinai (love-happy-not = I am unhappily in love)

Evidentials, derived from those of American Indian languages and the constructed language Láadan, show how the speaker came to say the utterance, i.e. the source of the information or the idea:

ti'e la .uengas cu zergau
[I hear!] Wenga is-a-crime-doer.
I hear that Wenga is a crook.

ba'acu'i le tuple be mi cu se cortu
[I experience!] The leg of me is-the-locus-of-pain.
My leg hurts.

pe'i la .kartagos. .ei se daspo
[I opine!] Carthage [obligation] is-destroyed.
In my opinion, Carthage should be destroyed.

==== Prepositions ====
There are two kinds of prepositions (sumtcita, which refers to adpositions in general) in Lojban: tense markers and proper prepositions. The syntactic difference is that a proper preposition can be converted with se, whereas a tense marker cannot. All proper prepositions (except the vague one do'e) are formed from a brivla and mark their object semantically as being in a place of that brivla. Thus the following are equivalent:

mi pilno lo me'andi lo nu skagau lei kerfa
I use henna to color the hair.

mi skagau lei kerfa sepi'o lo me'andi
I color the hair with henna.

Prepositions (including tense markers) can also be placed in .i ... bo to make sentence conjunctions. With most prepositions this makes no sense, but ki'u, ja'e, mu'i and ni'i are often used this way to express various kinds of "because" and "therefore":

la .djan. cpacu le pamoi se jinga .iki'ubo ri jinga
John got the first prize because he won.

==== Tense words ====
Lojban has 63 unique tense words to express various aspects of both space and time as well as event: such a system is unusual among other languages, in that it deals with spatial and temporal aspects in the same term. Simply put, these tense words are used to show where and when the event is taking place, relative in space-time to when the sentence is spoken. They can be roughly subdivided as follows:

Intervals	pu (before), ca (during), ba (after), bu'u (at/coincident with), ne'a (next to), re'o (adjacent to), te'e (bordering), pa'o (passing through), ne'i (within), fa'a (towards), to'o (away from), ze'o (outward), zo'a (inward), zo'a (passing by/tangential to), ga'u (above), ni'a (below), ca'u (in front of), ti'a (behind), ri'u (to the right of), zu'a (to the left of), be'a (north of), ne'u (south of), vu'a (west of), du'a (east of), ru'u (surrounding), cu'e (when/where, as a question word)
Modifiers	zi (a short time away), za (a medium-length time away), zu (a long time away), vi (a short distance away, here), va (a medium distance away, near), vu (a long distance away, there), ze'i (for a short time), ze'a (for a medium-length time), ze'u (for a long time), ze'e (for the whole time), ve'i (in a small area), ve'a (in a medium-sized area), ve'u (in a large area), ve'e (in the whole area), vi'i (along a (1D) line), vi'a (throughout a (2D) area), vi'u (throughout a (3D) space), vi'e (throughout a (4D) spacetime)
Contours	ca'o (continuative, during), pu'o (anticipative, until), ba'o (perfective, since), co'a (initiative, at the start), co'i (achievative, at instantaneous point of), co'u (cessative, at the end even if premature), mo'u (completive, at natural end), za'o (superfective, continuing after natural end), de'a (pausative, temporary pause), di'a (resumptive, continuing after pause)
Converters	mo'i, fe'e, roi, re'u, jai, ki

The "converters" require further explanation: mo'i marks that the movement is towards (or away from, etc.) a point rather than at a point, so that be'a, meaning "(occurring) in the north", becomes mo'ibe'a, "(heading) northward"; roi marks the number of times an event takes place, e.g. paroi (once), roroi (always), noroi (never), re'u indicated an ordinal, e.g. pare'u, first time; fe'e marks an interval in space rather than in time, so that, for example, fe'e co'a is the "beginning point" of something physically extending in a given direction; jai is used to mark tense words that have been moved in a sentence, comparable to se/te/ve/xe and fa/fe/fi/fo/fu for sumti; ki marks a "sticky tense", as explained below.

Marking tenses is always optional in Lojban:

mi klama le zarci (default: no temporal tense)
I went/have-gone/go/am-going/will-go/continually-go-to the-market.

mi ba'o klama le zarci
I have-gone-to the-market.

mi capu'o klama le zarci
I am-about-going-to the-market.

Where the tense information is not specified, the context resolves the interpretation.

Tense words are usually put right before the selbri:

mi [cu] pu klama le zarci (cu is the implicit separator between the first sumti mi and the selbri klama.)

They may be placed elsewhere with the additional terminator ku:

pu ku mi [cu] klama le zarci

mi [cu] klama pu ku le zarci

mi [cu] klama le zarci pu [ku] (ku is elidable at the end of the bridi)

The terminator is used so that the tense word do not directly run into the following sumti and modify it. Compare the next sentences:

ba ku le nunsalci cu cfari
[At some point in the future] the festival will start.

ba le nunsalci cu cfari
After the festival, [something unspecified] will start.

Tenses can be "layered up":

mi pu klama le zdani .i le zdani pu pu se daspo
I [past] go-to the house. The house [past][past] be-destroyed.
I went to the house. The house had been destroyed.

Tenses can be "sticky" by being set with ki, continuing in effect over more than a single bridi, until it is unset:

mi pu ki fengu binxo .i le nixli cu klaku cfari .i mi ki xenru
I [past]-[set this tense] angry-kind-of become. The girl crying-kind-of start. I [set this tense] regret.
(Earlier) I got angry. The girl started crying. (Now) I regret.

The second ki resets the tense to the implicit default time from the speaker's point of view, which is "now" (this means that ki may be used as a tense word by itself).

Using ki, equivalents of the previous layering tenses can be produced:

mi puki klama le zdani .i le zdani pu se daspo

The second pu is to be counted from the tense set by the last ki, so in effect it is equivalent to pupu.

Similar to the tense words are a collection of words to show potentiality: ca'a, "actually is"; ka'e, "is innately capable of"; nu'o, "can but has not"; pu'i, "can and has". These words operate in the same way as tense words.

la verba ca'a sanga
The child is (actually, currently) singing.

la verba ka'e sanga
The child is naturally capable of singing.
The child can sing.

la verba nu'o sanga
The child has the undemonstrated potential for singing.
The child can sing, but hasn't sung yet.

la verba pu'i sanga
The child has the demonstrated potential for singing.
The child can sing, and has shown that it can.

==== Grouping ====
By default, operators such as connectives and the silent "tanru glue" are left-grouping, and connectives bind tighter than "tanru glue".

lo barda tcadu gerku
Big-city dogs. (dogs of the big-city kind, not big dogs of the city kind)

banzu fa tu'a lo patxu .a lo palne .e lo matne
It's enough to have the pot or the pan as well as the butter. (not: either just the pot, or both the pan and the butter)

ti jmive je zvasto ja morsi
This one is either alive and staying put, or dead. (not: alive, and either staying put or dead)

mi'o cliva troci je fliba
We tried and failed to leave. (not: tried to leave and failed to do something else)

Other groupings must be specified explicitly. One way to do this is by pairs of cmavo that surround a group. The terminating cmavo may be elidible. In most cases, groups begin with ke and end with ke'e.

.ai mi do dunda be ti .e ke ta .a tu [ke'e]
I'll give you this here, and either that there, or that yonder. (not: either this here and that there, or that yonder)

Groups within a mathematical expression begin with vei and end with ve'o.

li by. pi'i vei re su'i cy. [ve'o]
b(2 + c)

Sentences are grouped with tu'e and tu'u.

do cadzu .i je tu'e mi do darxi .i ja do mi pamjai tu'u .i je mi'o casnu la'e di'u
You walk, and either I hit you or you hug me, and we discuss it.

Another way of overriding the default grouping is using the cmavo bo after an operator. Such operators bind tighter than ones without bo, and group to the right amongst each other.

lo barda gerku bo tcadu liste
The big dog-city list.

lo palku .e lo mapku .a bo lo smoka .e bo lo gluta
Pants, and [either hats, or [socks and gloves]].
