= Okrent =

Okrent is a surname. Notable people with the surname include:

- Arika Okrent, American linguist
- Daniel Okrent (born 1948), American writer and editor
- Detlef Okrent (1909–1983), German field hockey player

== See also ==
- Ockrent
