= Ockrent =

Ockrent is a surname. Notable people with the surname include:

- Christine Ockrent (born 1944), Belgian journalist
- Mike Ockrent (1946–1999), British stage director

== See also ==
- Okrent
