= Arika Okrent =

American linguist

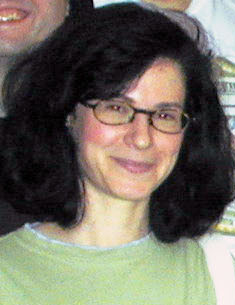
- Arika Okrent at Lojban Festival at Philcon in 2006
- Born: Chicago
- Occupations: Linguist, non-fiction writer

Academic background
- Education: Carleton College, Gallaudet University (MA), University of Chicago (PhD)

Academic work
- Notable works: In the Land of Invented Languages

Arika Okrent /ˈɛrɪkə ˈoʊkrɛnt/ is an American linguist and writer of popular works on linguistic topics.

== Early life and education ==
Okrent was born in Chicago to parents of Polish and Transylvanian descent. She was fascinated by languages beginning at an early age, which is what made her pursue a career in linguistics.

After graduating from Carleton College in 1992, she left for Hungary to teach there for a year. She earned an M.A. in Linguistics from the Gallaudet University, and a Ph.D. in Psycholinguistics from the University of Chicago in 2004.

== Career ==
Okrent is known particularly for her 2009 book In the Land of Invented Languages: Esperanto Rock Stars, Klingon Poets, Loglan Lovers, and the Mad Dreamers Who Tried to Build A Perfect Language, a result of her five years of research into the topic of constructed languages. Her well-received 2021 book, Highly Irregular, written with Sean O'Neill, explains how the history of English explains a number of its modern irregularities and exceptions.

She is featured in Sam Green's 2011 Esperanto documentary The Universal Language.

She is a regular contributor on linguistics and language topics to the online magazine Mental Floss.

== Honors and awards ==
In 2015 Okrent became the second winner of the Linguistic Society of America's Linguistics Journalism Award.

== Personal life ==
She can speak in English, Hungarian, American Sign Language and Klingon, and some Esperanto.

She is the niece of writer and editor Daniel Okrent.

== Books ==
- Okrent, Arika (2009). In the Land of Invented Languages: Esperanto Rock Stars, Klingon Poets, Loglan Lovers, and the Mad Dreamers Who Tried to Build A Perfect Language. Spiegel & Grau. pp. 352. ISBN 978-0-385-52788-0.
- Okrent, Arika and O'Neill, Sean (2021). Highly Irregular: Why Tough, Through, and Dough Don't Rhyme And Other Oddities of the English Language. Oxford University Press. ISBN 978-0197539408.
