= Lojban =

Constructed human language based on predicate logic

- la .lojban.
- Pronunciation: [laʔ ˈloʒbanʔ]
- Created by: Logical Language Group
- Date: 1987
- Setting and usage: a logically engineered language for various usages
- Users: >5, Unknown.
- Purpose: Constructed languages: engineered languages; logical languages; Lojban
- Writing system: Primarily Latin, others available
- Sources: Loglan

Language codes
- ISO 639-2: jbo
- ISO 639-3: jbo
- Glottolog: lojb1234

Lojban (pronounced [ˈloʒban]) is a logical, constructed human language created by the Logical Language Group, which aims to be syntactically unambiguous. It succeeds the Loglan project.

The Logical Language Group (LLG) began developing Lojban in 1987. The LLG sought to realize Loglan's purposes and further improve the language by making it more usable and freely available (as indicated by its official full English title, Lojban: A Realization of Loglan). After a long initial period of debating and testing, the baseline was completed in 1997 and published as The Complete Lojban Language. In an interview in 2010 with The New York Times, Arika Okrent, the author of In the Land of Invented Languages, stated, "The constructed language with the most complete grammar is probably Lojban—a language created to reflect the principles of logic."

Lojban is proposed as a speakable language for communication between people of different language backgrounds, as a potential means of machine translation, and as a tool to explore the intersection between human language and software.

== History ==
=== Etymology ===
The name "Lojban" means "logical language". It is a compound formed from loj and ban, which are short forms of logji (logic) and bangu (language), respectively. In Lojban, a compound is called a lujvo and short forms like those (used especially to form compounds) are called rafsi.

=== Origins from Loglan ===
Lojban's predecessor, Loglan, a language invented by James Cooke Brown in 1955 and later developed by The Loglan Institute, was originally conceived as a means to examine the influence of language on the speaker's thought (an assumption known as linguistic relativism).

As Brown started to claim his copyright on the language's components, bans were put on the language community's activities to stop changes to aspects of the language. In order to circumvent such control, a group of Loglan users decided to initiate a separate project, departing from the lexical basis of Loglan and reinventing the whole vocabulary, which led to the current lexicon of Lojban. To this effect, they established the Logical Language Group in 1987, based in Washington, D.C. They also won a trial over whether they could call their version of the language Loglan.

=== Divergence from Loglan ===
The phonetic form of Lojban gismu (root words) was created algorithmically by searching for sound patterns in words with similar meanings in world languages and by weighting those sound patterns by the number of speakers of those languages. The list of source languages used for the algorithm was limited to the six most widely spoken languages as of 1987, namely Mandarin, English, Hindi, Spanish, Russian, and Arabic. This resulted in root words being, in their phonetic form, a relatively equal mixture of English and Mandarin, with lesser influences from the other four.

Lojban also utilizes a set of evidential indicators adapted from the constructed language Láadan.

Following the publication of The Complete Lojban Language, it was expected that the documented lexicon would be baselined, and the combination of lexicon and reference grammar would be frozen for a minimum of five years while language usage grew. As scheduled, this period, which has officially been called the freeze, expired in 2002. The speakers of Lojban are now free to construct new words and idioms, and decide where the language is heading.

=== Contributors ===
Below are some of the notable personalities who have contributed to the development of Lojban:

- Bob LeChevalier (also known as la lojbab): the founder and the president of the LLG.
- Robin Lee Powell (also known as la camgusmis): the author of a novel-sized story, la nicte cadzu (Night Walkers).
- Jorge Llambías (also known as la xorxes): one of the most active Lojbanists, having done several translations. He is also a prominent figure on the mailing list, helping beginners with the language.
- John W. Cowan: the author of The Complete Lojban Language.
- Miles Forster (also known as la selpa'i): a German Lojbanist who wrote the song ca pa djedi and made several large translations into Lojban.
- Robin Turner: a British philosopher and linguist living in Turkey, and coauthor of Lojban For Beginners.
- Nick Nicholas (also known as la nitcion): an Australian linguist, and coauthor of Lojban For Beginners.

=== Learning resources ===
Apart from the actual practice of the language, some members of the community and LLG have been endeavoring to create various aids for the learners. The Complete Lojban Language (CLL, also known as The Red Book because of its color, and The Codex Woldemar, after its author), the definitive word on all aspects of Lojban, is one of them, finalized in 1997. Some of the projects in varying stages of completeness are:

- Different textbooks, presentations to help learn Lojban
- la muplis, an application listing Lojban sentences from the Tatoeba database with their translation to other languages
- Parser: la ilmentufa (also includes experimental grammar), la camxes (by Robin Lee Powell and Jorge Llambías), la jbofi'e (by Richard Curnow)
- Database: la jbovlaste (initial version by Jay Kominek)

Lojban's learning resources on the internet are available mainly to speakers of English, French, Spanish, Russian, Hebrew, and Esperanto, to varying degrees.

== Applications ==
While the initial aim of the Loglan project was to investigate linguistic relativity, the active Lojban community recognizes additional applications for the language, including:

- Improved human–human communication, due to the logical and unambiguous structure and greater means of expression (use as a speakable language)
  - Eliminating syntactic ambiguity in language
- Use as an educational tool
- Research in artificial intelligence and machine understanding
  - Improved human–computer communication, storage ontologies, and computer translation of natural language text
- Research in linguistics
- Use as an academic language, such as in science or philosophy

=== Literary and cultural language ===
Lojban is practiced by its speakers in text and voice chats.

Like most languages with few speakers, Lojban lacks much of an associated body of literature and its creative extensions have not been fully realized. For example, the true potential of its attitudinal system is considered unlikely to be drawn out until and unless children are raised entirely in a multicultural Lojban-speaking environment.. Also such collective or encyclopedic sources of knowledge like the Lojban Wikipedia, which may help expand the language's lexical horizon, are not very well developed.

Presently accessible Lojbanic writings are principally concentrated on Lojban.org, though there exist independent Lojbanic blog/journal sites as well. The Lojban IRC (or its archive) has a gathering of Lojbanic expressions too, but its grammatical correctness is not always guaranteed. These available materials on the internet include both original works and translations of classic pieces in the field of natural languages, ranging from poetry, short story, novel, and academic writing. Examples of works that are already available include:

- Alice's Adventures in Wonderland
- The Wonderful Wizard of Oz
- The Little Prince
- The Metamorphosis
- In a Grove
- The Book of Esther

Lojban has also been used in other media. For example, the videogame Minecraft has been partially translated into Lojban.

=== Means of creativity ===
Lojban is seen by some as an intellectual device for creative writing or as having many potential aspects yet to be discovered or explored.

Dan Parmenter:

The removal of grammatical ambiguity from modification [...] seems to heighten creative exploration of word combination. [...] Other areas of possible benefit are (surprisingly in a "logical" language) emotional expression. Lojban has a fully developed set of metalinguistic and emotional attitude indicators that supplant much of the baggage of aspect and mood found in natural languages, but most clearly separate indicative statements from the emotional communication associated with those statements. This might lead to freer expression and consideration of ideas, since stating an idea can be distinguished from supporting that idea. The set of possible indicators is also large enough to provide specificity and clarity of emotions that is difficult in natural languages.

John Cowan:

There is a marker for "figurative speech" which would be used on "back stabber" and would signal "There is a culturally dependent construction here." The intent is not that everything is instantly and perfectly comprehensible to someone who knows only the root words, but rather that non-root words are built up creatively from the roots. Thus "heart pain" would refer to the literal heart and literal pain; what would be ambiguous would be the exact connection between these two. Is the pain in the heart, because of the heart, or what? But "heart pain" would not be a valid tanru for "emotional pain", absent the figurative speech marker.

The language was built to attempt to remove some limits on human thought; these limits are not understood, so that the tendency is to try to remove restrictions whenever we find the language structure gets in our way. You definitely can talk nonsense in Lojban.

Bob LeChevalier:

In Lojban, a little grammar makes for a lot of semantic fun, since the grammar doesn't interfere with the semantic quibble you love. [...] In addition to its grammar, Lojban is definitely a priori in its words. [...] We presume that everything can be covered as compounds of the classification scheme implied by the gismu [root words]. [...] We haven't, though, tried to impose a system on the universe like most a priori languages have. Instead, we have tried to broaden gismu flexibility so that multiple approaches to classifying the universe are possible. Our rule is that any word have one meaning, not that any meaning have one word. There is no "proper" classification scheme in Lojban. [...] Lojban offers a new world of thought.

=== Programming language ===
Constructs in programming languages have been shown to be translated to Lojban.

As with some programming languages, Lojban grammar can be parsed using parsing expression grammars.

=== Speakable logic ===
Lojban has been shown to be translated in some of its parts into predicate logic. There are also analogies between Lojban and combinatory logic.

=== Potential machine interlingua ===
There have been proposals to use Lojban as an intermediate language in interlingual machine translation and knowledge representation.

== Linguistic properties ==
Lojban:

- is designed to express complex logical constructs precisely.
- has no irregularities or ambiguities in spelling and grammar (although word derivation relies on arbitrary variant forms). This gives rise to high intelligibility for computer parsing.
- is designed to be as culturally neutral as possible.
- allows highly systematic learning and use, compared to most natural languages.
- possesses an intricate system of indicators that effectively communicate contextual attitude or emotions.

=== Phonology and orthography ===
Lojban has 6 vowels and 18 consonants. Some of them have, apart from the preferred/standard sounds, permitted variants intended to cover dissimilitude in pronunciation by speakers of different linguistic backgrounds.

Stress normally falls on the penultimate syllable.

There are 16 diphthongs (and no triphthongs). A distinction between diphthongs and monophthongs can be written by inserting a comma in the Latin alphabet. Vowel hiatus is also prevented by inserting an apostrophe, which usually indicates [h], though there are other valid realizations. For those who have trouble pronouncing certain consonant clusters, there is the option of adding vowels between them (epenthesis), as long as they differ sufficiently from the phonological vowels and are pronounced as short as possible. The resulting additional syllables are not factored into the grammar, including for the purposes of stress determination.

Lojban is written almost entirely with lower-case letters; upper-case letters are used to mark stress in words that do not fit the normal rules of stress assignment, or when whitespace is omitted.

The letters in Lojban and their respective pronunciations are shown in the table below. The IPA symbols in parentheses indicate alternative pronunciations; preferred pronunciations have no parentheses.

Lojban consonant phonemes
		Labial	Alveolar	Postalveolar	Velar	Glottal
Nasal		m (Note: Sonorants /m n l r/ may be syllabic.)	n			
Plosive	voiceless	p	t		k	. /ʔ/
Plosive	voiced	b	d		ɡ	. /ʔ/
Fricative	voiceless	f /f/ ([ɸ])	s	c /ʃ/ ([ʂ])	x or χ	' /h/ ([θ])
Fricative	voiced	v /v/ ([β])	z	j /ʒ/ ([ʐ])		' /h/ ([θ])
Approximant			l			
Rhotic			r (Note: There is no preferred sound for /r/; any rhotic sound is equally acceptable.)			

Lojban vowel phonemes
	Front	Central	Back
Close	i		u
Mid	e /ɛ/ ([e])	y /ə/	o /o/ ([ɔ])
Open	a /a/ ([ɑ])		

	Letters																							Auxiliary characters		
IPA	[a] ([ɑ])	[b]	[ʃ] ([ʂ])	[d]	[ɛ] ([e])	[f] ([ɸ])	[ɡ]	[i]	[ʒ] ([ʐ])	[k]	[l]	[m]	[n]	[o] ([ɔ])	[p]	[r]	[s]	[t]	[u]	[v] ([β])	[x]	[ə]	[z]	[h] ([θ])	[ʔ]	.
Latin	a	b	c	d	e	f	g	i	j	k	l	m	n	o	p	r	s	t	u	v	x	y	z	'	.	,

In principle, Lojban may be written in any orthographic system as long as it satisfies the required regularities and unambiguities. Some of the reasons for such elasticity would be as follows:

1. Lojban is defined by the phonemes rather than graphemes; as long as they are correctly rendered so as to maintain the Lojbanic audio-visual isomorphism, a representational system can be said to be an appropriate orthography of the language;
2. Lojban is meant to be as culturally neutral as possible, so it is never crucial or fundamental to claim that some particular orthography of some particular languages (e.g. the Latin alphabet) should be the dominant mode.

Some Lojbanists extend this principle of cultural neutrality and assert that Lojban should have its own alphabet.

This article uses the common Latin alphabet mode.

=== Morphology ===
Lojban has three word-classes: predicate words (brivla), structure words (cmavo), and name words (cmevla). Each of them has uniquely identifying properties, so that one can unambiguously recognize which word is of which part of speech in a string of the language. They may be further divided in sub-classes. There also exists a special fragmental form (rafsi) assigned to some predicate words and structure words, from which compound predicate words (lujvo) may be created.

=== Syntax and semantics ===
The language's grammatical structures are "defined by a set of rules that have been tested to be unambiguous using computers", which is in effect called the "machine grammar". Hence the characteristics of the standard syntactic (not semantic) constructs in Lojban:

- each word has exactly one grammatical interpretation;
- the words relate grammatically to each other in exactly one way.

Such standards, however, are to be attained with certain carefulness:

new Lojbanists will not be able to speak 'perfectly' when first learning Lojban. In fact, you may never speak perfectly in 'natural' Lojban conversation, even though you achieve fluency in the language. No English speaker always speaks textbook English in natural conversation; Lojban speakers will also make grammatical errors when talking quickly. Lojbanists will, however, be able to speak or write unambiguously if they are careful, which is difficult if not impossible with a natural language.

— Nick Nicholas and John Cowan. 'What Is Lojban? II.3

The computer-tested, unambiguous rules also include grammar for incomplete sentences e.g. for narrative, quotational, or mathematical phrases.

Its typology can be said to be basically subject–verb–object and subject–object–verb. However, it can practically have any order:

- mi prami do (SVO) (I love you)
- mi do prami (SOV) (By me, you are loved)
- do se prami mi (OVS) (You are loved by me)
- do mi se prami (OSV) (You, I love)
- prami fa mi do (VSO) (Loved by me, you are)
- prami do fa mi or se prami fa do mi (VOS) (Love you, I do)

Such flexibility has to do with the language's intended capability to translate as many expressions of natural languages as possible, based on a unique positional case system. The meaning of the sentence mi prami do is determined by prami realizing, with its own predefined place structure, a specific semantic relation between mi and do; when the positional relation between mi and do changes, the meaning of the sentence changes too. As shown above, Lojban has particular devices to preserve such semantic structure of words while altering their order.

As befits a logical language, there is a large assortment of logical connectives. Such conjunction words take different forms depending on what they connect, another reason why the (standard) Lojbanic expressions are typically precise and clear.

Multiple predicate words may be linked up together so as to narrow the semantic scope of the phrase. In sutra dansu "to quickly dance", the modifying word sutra narrows the sense of the modified word dansu to form a more specific concept (in which case the modifier may resemble English adverbs or adjectives).

=== Lexicon ===
Compound words (lujvo) and borrowed words (fu'ivla) are continually increasing as the speakers find demands. The number of root words (gismu) and structure words (cmavo) are basically unchanging, but new inventions are to be accepted as experimental components. In fact, it has been noticed that a particular inclination or disproportion exists in the available vocabulary. Cortesi has pointed out the lack of certain terms for mathematics and geometry (although this demand may now be disputed as the current set of Lojban vocabulary does actually allow speakers to express such notions as steradian (stero), trigonometric tangent (tanjo), multiplicative inverse (fa'i), matrix transpose (re'a) among a number of other kinds of operators or metric units). Other instances which require speakers to construct noncanonical words:

- There are few entries of African country names on the official list of root words while other country names (especially those with large populations of speakers of the six source languages) are covered to a remarkable extent.
- Such distinction as between palne (tray) and palta (plate) exists, while no distinction between illustration and photography is made by the available set of gismu (that is, no exclusive root word for photography exists except the generic pixra (picture)) (see also – Grammar: Morphology: brivla: gismu).

== Samples ==
=== Common phrases ===
Lojban	literal meaning	English
coi/co'o coi/co'o	hello/goodbye	hello!/good-bye!
pe'u pe'u	please	please!
ki'e ki'e	thanks	thanks!
.u'u u'u	(repentance)	I'm sorry!
.uu	(pity)	I'm sorry!
xu do se glibau/jbobau xu do se glibau/jbobau	is-it-true-that you be-a-speaker-of-English-language / is-a-speaker-of-Lojban-language	Do you speak English / Lojban?
ti/ta/tu ti/ta/tu	this/that/that-over-there	this one/that one/that yonder
mi na jimpe mi na jimpe	I not-true-that understand	I don't understand
go'i go'i	(the last clause)	yes, that's true
na go'i na go'i	not-true-that (the last clause)	no, that's false
la'u ma la'u ma	being-a-quantity-of what?	How much, how many?
ma jdima ma jdima	what is-the-price	What's the cost?
lo vimku'a cu se stuzi ma	thing-described-as being-an-excretion-room : is-located-at what?	Where's the bathroom?

=== Unique Lojbanic expressions ===
Lojban	.oi	ro'o	bu'o nai	pei
Gloss	attitudinal: pain!	in physical sense	attitude ends	what's your attitude?
Translation	Are you no longer in pain?			

Lojban	mi	nelci	ko
Gloss	I	like	imperative "you"
Translation	Make it so that I like you!		

Lojban	lo	cukta	ku	be'u	zvati	ma
Gloss	that which	is book(s)	end of noun phrase	attitudinal: need!	is located at	what?
Translation	I need a book! Where is it?					

Lojban	ko	ga'i nai	klama	lo	nenri	be	lo	mi	zdani
Gloss	imperative "you"	attitudinal: meekness!	come to	that which	is inside of	[attach arguments of noun]	that which	my	is home
Translation	I would be honored if you would enter my residence.								

Lojban	se ri'a	gi	mi	jgari	lo	djacu	gi	mi	jgari	lo	kabri
Gloss	with physical effect	of (	I	grasp	that which	is some water	)	I	grasp	that which	is cup
Translation	I grasp water, since I grasp a cup.										

=== The North Wind and the Sun ===
A translation of The North Wind and the Sun.

la berti brife jo'u la solri

ni'o la berti brife jo'u la solri pu troci lo ka cuxna lo poi me vo'a vau traji be lo ka vlipa i ca'o bo lo pa litru noi dasni lo glare kosta cu klama

.i le re mei pu simxu lo ka tugni fi lo nu lo traji be lo ka clira fa lo nu ce'u snada lo ka gasnu lo nu le litru co'u dasni le kosta cu traji lo ka vlipa

.i ba bo la berti brife co'a traji cupra lo brife i ku'i lo nu by by zenba lo ka cupra lo xo kau brife cu rinka lo nu le litru zu'e ri zenba lo ka se tagji le kosta i ba bo la berti brife co'u troci i ba bo la solri co'a glare dirce i ba zi bo le litru co'u dasni le kosta

.i se ki'u bo la berti brife cu bilga lo ka tugni fi lo nu la solri cu traji lo ka vlipa

=== A Lojbanic poem (audio) ===
- xekri je blanu nicte

=== The Lord's Prayer ===
The Lord's Prayer in Lojban

doi cevrirni.iu noi zvati le do cevzda do'u
fu'e.aicai.e'ecai lo do cmene ru'i censa
.i le do nobli turni be la ter. ku se cfari
.i loi do se djica ba snada mulno vi'e le cevzda.e.a'o la ter.
(.i do nobli turni vi'e le cevzda.ebazake.a'o la ter.)
(.i loi do se djica ba snada mulno vi'e le cevzda.e.a'o la ter.)
.i fu'e.e'o ko dunda ca. le cabdei le ri nanba mi'a
.i ko fraxu mi loi ri zu'o palci
.ijo mi fraxu roda poi pacyzu'e xrani mi
.i ko lidne mi fa'anai loi pacyxlu
.i ko sepri'a mi loi palci

== Comparison with other logical languages ==
=== Loglan ===
The principal difference between Lojban and Loglan is one of lexicon. The words for Lojban were made by the same principles as those for Loglan; that is, candidate forms were chosen according to how many sounds they had in common with their equivalent in some of the most commonly spoken languages on Earth, which was then multiplied by the number of speakers of the languages with which the words had letters in common. The difference with the Lojban remake of the root words was that the weighting was updated to reflect the actual numbers of speakers for the languages. This resulted in word forms that had fewer sounds taken from English, and more sounds taken from Chinese. For instance, the Loglan word norma is equivalent to the Lojban word cnano (cf. Chinese 常, pinyin cháng), both meaning "normal".

Loglan and Lojban still have essentially the same grammars, and most of what is said in the Grammar section above holds true for Loglan as well. Most simple, declarative sentences could be translated word by word between the two languages.

In the new phonology for Lojban, the consonant q and the vowel w were removed, and the consonant h was replaced by x. The letter ' (apostrophe) was added with the value of [h] in the International Phonetic Alphabet, but its distribution is such that it can appear only intervocalically, and in discussions of the morphology and phonotactics, it is neither a consonant nor a vowel, but a syllable separator, realized as a "voiceless glide". (This phoneme is realized as θ by some speakers.)

=== gua\spi ===
gua\spi, developed by Jim Carter, is a tonal descendent of Loglan. In Gua\spi, instead of structure words, there are six different tones, and predicates have only one syllable instead of two. Some of its characteristics, including tones, phonotactics, expressions for masses vs sets, non-existence of metalinguistic negation, etc., received criticism.

== See also ==
- Case grammar
- FrameNet
- Simplified Technical English
- Ithkuil
- Comparison between Lojban and Loglan
