= Engineered language =

Category of constructed language

Engineered languages (often abbreviated to engelangs, or, less commonly, engilangs) are constructed languages devised to test or prove some hypotheses about how languages work or might work. There are at least three subcategories, philosophical languages (or ideal languages), logical languages (sometimes abbreviated as loglangs), and experimental languages. Raymond Brown describes engineered languages as "languages that are designed to specified objective criteria, and modeled to meet those criteria".

Some engineered languages have been considered candidate global auxiliary languages, and some languages intended as international auxiliary languages have certain "engineered" aspects (in which they are more regular and systematic than their natural language sources).

== Logical languages ==
Logical languages are meant to allow (or enforce) syntactically and semantically unambiguous statements. They are typically based on predicate logic but can also be based on any system of formal logic. The two best-known logical languages are the predicate languages Loglan and its successor Lojban. They both aim to eliminate syntactical ambiguity and minimize semantic ambiguity. In particular, the grammar of Lojban is carefully engineered to express such predicate logic in an unambiguous manner. Toaq and Eberban are also logical languages. More recently, the field of loglanging (constructing said logical languages) has turned more towards relying on formal semantics as a tool to prove a loglang as completely unambiguous, the most prominent example being Toaq and its parser, Kúna.

== Philosophical languages ==
Philosophical languages are designed to reflect some aspect of philosophy, particularly with respect to the nature or potential of any given language. John Wilkins' Real Character and Edward Powell Foster's Ro constructed their words using a taxonomic tree. Vocabularies of oligosynthetic languages, for example aUI and Ygyde, are made of compound words, which are coined from a small (theoretically minimal) set of morphemes. Sonja Lang's Toki Pona is based on minimalistic simplicity.

== Experimental languages ==
An experimental language is a constructed language designed for the purpose of exploring some element in the theory of linguistics. Most such languages are concerned with the relation between language and thought; however, languages have been constructed to explore other aspects of language as well.

In science fiction, much work has been done on the assumption popularly known as the Sapir–Whorf hypothesis. Suzette Haden Elgin's Láadan is designed to lexicalize and grammaticalize the concepts and distinctions important to women, based on muted group theory.

Story of Your Life is a short story by Ted Chiang that heavily features a written-only non-linear language (text in it has no discernible beginning or end) in the form of its Heptapod B, though the language is only described vaguely and never actually shown. This story was adapted into the movie Arrival, though its version of Heptapod B is only non-linear to a certain extent.

== See also ==
- Controlled natural language
- International auxiliary language
- Artistic language
- Ithkuil
- Lojban
