= Loglan =

Constructed language

- La Logla
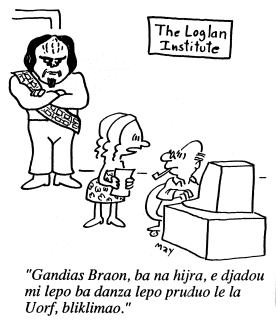
- Cartoon translation: "Professor Brown, someone is here, and has informed me that he wishes to test the Whorf hypothesis."
- Created by: James Cooke Brown
- Date: 1955
- Setting and usage: engineered language for testing the Sapir–Whorf hypothesis and other linguistic research
- Purpose: Constructed language: engineered language; logical language; Loglan
- Sources: eight of the most common languages: English, Chinese (Beijing dialect), Hindi, Russian, Spanish, French, Japanese, German

Language codes
- ISO 639-3: –
- Glottolog: None
- IETF: art-x-loglan

Loglan is a logical constructed language originally designed for linguistic research, particularly for investigating the Sapir–Whorf hypothesis. The language was developed beginning in 1955 by Dr. James Cooke Brown with the goal of making a language so different from natural languages that people learning it would think in a different way if the hypothesis were true. In 1960, Scientific American published an article introducing the language. Loglan is the first among, and the main inspiration for, the languages known as logical languages, which also includes Lojban.

Brown founded The Loglan Institute (TLI) to develop the language and other applications of it. He always considered the language an incomplete research project, and although he released many publications about its design, he continued to claim legal restrictions on its use. Because of this, a group of his followers later formed the Logical Language Group to create the language Lojban along the same principles, but with the intention to make it freely available and encourage its use as a real language.

Supporters of Lojban use the term Loglan as a generic term to refer to both their own language and Brown's Loglan, referred to as "TLI Loglan" when in need of disambiguation. Although the non-trademarkability of the term Loglan was eventually upheld by the United States Patent and Trademark Office, many supporters and members of The Loglan Institute find this usage offensive and reserve Loglan for the TLI version of the language.

== Goals ==
Loglan (an abbreviation for "logical language") was created to investigate whether people speaking a "logical language" would in some way think more logically, as the Sapir–Whorf hypothesis might predict. The language's grammar is based on predicate logic. The grammar was intended to be small enough to be teachable and manageable, yet complex enough to allow people to think and converse in the language.

Brown intended Loglan to be as culturally neutral as possible and metaphysically parsimonious, which means that obligatory categories are kept to a minimum. An example of an obligatory category in English is the time-tense of verbs, as it is impossible to express a finite verb without also expressing a tense.

Brown also intended the language to be completely regular and unambiguous. Each sentence can be parsed in only one way. Furthermore, the syllabic structure of words was designed so that a sequence of syllables can be separated into words in only one way, even if the word separation is not clear from pauses in speech. It has a small number of phonemes, so that regional "accents" are less likely to produce unintelligible speech. To make the vocabulary easier to learn, words were constructed to have elements in common with related words in the world's eight most widely spoken languages.

== Alphabet and pronunciation ==
The alphabet of Loglan has two historical versions. In that of 1975 there were only 21 letters with their corresponding phonemes. In the final version of 1989 five more phonemes had been incorporated: letter H (/h/) was added to the alphabet in 1977 by popular demand; letter Y (/ə/) was added in 1982 to work as a kind of hyphen between the terms of a complex word; letters Q (/θ/), W (/y/) and X (/x/) were added in 1986 in order to allow the incorporation of the Linnaean vocabulary of biology, and they were useful to give more exact pronunciations to many borrowed names.

Loglan alphabet
Uppercase letters	A	B	C	D	E	F	G	H	I	J	K	L	M	N	O	P	Q	R	S	T	U	V	W	X	Y	Z
Lowercase letters	a	b	c	d	e	f	g	h	i	j	k	l	m	n	o	p	q	r	s	t	u	v	w	x	y	z
IPA phonemes	a	b	ʃ	d	ɛ	f	g	h	i / j	ʒ	k	l	m	n	o	p	θ	ɹ	s	t	u / w	v	y	x	ə	z

Loglan consonant phonemes
		Labial	Dental	Alveolar	Palato-alveolar	Palatal	Velar	Glottal
Nasal		M /m/		N /n/				
Plosive	voiceless	P /p/		T /t/			K /k/	
Plosive	voiced	B /b/		D /d/			G /ɡ/	
Fricative	voiceless	F /f/	Q /θ/	S /s/	C /ʃ/		X /x/~[χ]	H /h/
Fricative	voiced	V /v/		Z /z/	J /ʒ/			H /h/
Approximant		U /w/		L /l/		I /j/		
Rhotic				R /ɹ/				

Loglan vowel phonemes
		Front	Central	Back
Close	unrounded	I /i/		
Close	rounded	W /y/		U /u/
Mid		E /ɛ/	Y /ə/	O /o/
Open		A /a/		

- The letters I and U when placed before vowels represent the IPA sounds /j/ and /w/ respectively. For example: ie /je/ ("what?"), ue /we/ ("what!" as an expression of surprise or interest).

== Grammar ==
Loglan has three types of words: predicates (also called content words), structure words (also called little words), and names. The majority of words are predicates; these are words that carry meaning. Structure words are words that modify predicates or show how they are related to each other, like English conjunctions and prepositions.

The class of a word can be determined from its form. A predicate has always two or more syllables, the last syllable being of the form CV, and the other syllables being of the form CVC or CCV. Thus, possible predicates are "kanto", "stari", "simgroma", "nirpatretka", and so on. A structure word has always one or more syllables, each syllable being one of the four forms V, VV, CV, or CVV. Thus possible structure words are "e", "ai", "ga", "kia", "lemio", "inorau" and so on. A name may have any form but always ends with a consonant, which distinguishes names from other words, since predicates and structure words always end in a vowel. Names in Loglan are spelled in accordance with Loglan phonetics, so if the name comes from another language, the Loglan spelling may differ from the spelling in that language. If a name in its native language ends in a vowel, it is conventional to add an "s" to form the Loglan name; for example, the English name "Mary" is rendered in Loglan as "Meris" (pronounced /ˈmɛriːs/).

=== Predicates ===
Loglan makes no distinction between nouns, verbs, adjectives and adverbs. A predicate may act as any of these, depending on its position in a sentence. Each predicate has its own argument structure with fixed positions for arguments. For example: vedma is the word for "sell". It takes four arguments: the seller, the item sold, the buyer and the price, in that order. When a predicate is used as a verb, the first argument appears before the predicate, and any subsequent arguments appear after it. So "S pa vedma T B P" means "S sold T to B for price P". (The structure word "pa" is the past-tense marker, discussed in more detail below.) Not all arguments need to be present; for example, "S pa vedma T B" means "S sold T to B", "S pa vedma T" means "S sold T", and "S pa vedma" simply means "S sold (something)".

Certain structure words can be used to reorder the arguments of a predicate, to emphasize one of the arguments by putting it first. For example, "nu" swaps the first and second arguments of any predicate. So "T pa nu vedma S" means the same thing as "S pa vedma T" and might be translated "T was sold by S". Similarly, "fu" swaps the first and third argument, and "ju" swaps the first and fourth argument. Thus "B pa fu vedma T S" = "B bought T from S", and "P pa ju vedma T B" = "P was paid to buy T by B".

=== Arguments ===
The structure word "le" makes a predicate behave as a noun, so that it can be used as an argument of another predicate. The three-place predicate "matma" means "M is the mother of C by father F", so "le matma" means "the mother". Thus "Le matma pa vedma" means "the mother sold (something)", while "Le vedma pa matma" means "the seller was a mother (of someone)".

A name can be used as an argument by preceding it with the structure word "la". Thus "La Adam vedma" means "Adam sells". Unlike in English and many other languages, this structure word is required; an unadorned name cannot be used as an argument. (The sentence "Adam vedma" is an imperative meaning "Adam, sell (something)." In this case, the name is used as a noun of address, not as an argument.)

A name, or any other word or phrase, can be explicitly quoted with the structure words "li" and "lu" to use the word itself, rather than the thing that word refers to, as an argument. Thus "Li Adam lu corta purda" means "Adam is a short word." Without the li/lu quotes, the sentence "La Adam corta purda" ("Adam is a short word") would claim that Adam, the person himself, is a short word.

=== Predicate modifiers ===
Any predicate can be used as an adjective or adverb by placing the predicate before the expression that it modifies. The predicate "sadji" means "X is wiser than Y about Z". So "Le sadji matma pa vedma" means "The wise mother sold", and "Le matma vedma pa sadji" means "The motherly seller was wise". Predicates can be used adverbially to modify the main predicate in the sentence in the same way. So "Le matma pa sadji vedma" means "The mother wisely sold". The structure word "go" can be used to invert the normal word order, so that the modifier follows the expression being modified. Thus "le matma go sadji" (the mother who is wise) means the same as "le sadji matma" (the wise mother).

A string of more than two predicates is left-associative. This grouping can be changed by using the structure word "ge", which groups what follows into a single unit. Thus Loglan can distinguish between the many possible meanings of the ambiguous English phrase "the pretty little girls' school", as in these examples:

- "le bilti cmalo nirli ckela" = the ((pretty little) girls') school
  the school for girls who are beautifully small;
- "le bilti cmalo ge nirli ckela" = the (pretty little) (girls' school)
  the school that is beautifully small for a girls' school;
- "le bilti ge cmalo nirli ckela" = the pretty ((little girls') school)
  the school that is beautiful for a small-girls' school;
- "le bilti ge cmalo ge nirli ckela" = the pretty (little (girls' school))
  the school that is beautiful for a small type of girls'-school.

Predicates can be modified to indicate the time at which something occurred (English tense) with the optional structure words "na" (present), "pa" (past) and "fa" (future). Thus "Le matma na vedma" means "The mother is (now) selling", while "Le matma fa vedma" means "The mother will sell". Marking the verb for tense is optional, so the word "ga" can be used when the time is not being specified. So "Le matma ga vedma" means "The mother sells (at some unspecified time in the past, present or future)".

=== Free variables ===
A set of structure words called free variables are used like English pronouns, but are designed to avoid the ambiguity of pronouns in such sentences as "Adam told Greg that he needed to leave." The free variable "da" refers to the most recently mentioned noun, "de" refers to the one mentioned prior to that, "di" to the one prior to that, and so on. Compare the sentences

- "La Adam pa vedma le negda la Greg i da gacpi" = Adam sold the egg to Greg; he (Greg) was happy.
- "La Adam pa vedma le negda la Greg i di gacpi" = Adam sold the egg to Greg; he (Adam) was happy.

Free variables apply equally to people of any gender and inanimate objects; there is no distinction similar to that between English "he", "she" and "it". This explains why "di" rather than "de" was used in the second example. "La Adam pa vedma le negda la Greg i de gacpi" would mean "Adam sold the egg to Greg; it (the egg) was happy."

=== Conjunctions ===
Loglan has several sets of conjunctions to express the fourteen possible logical connectives. One set is used to combine predicate expressions ("e" = and, "a" = inclusive or, "o" = if and only if), and another set is used to combine predicates to make more complex predicates ("ce", "ca", "co"). The sentence "La Kim matma e sadji" means "Kim is a mother and is wise", while "La Kim matma ce sadji vedma" means "Kim is a motherly and wise seller", or "Kim sells in a motherly and wise manner". In the latter sentence, "ce" is used to combine matma and sadji into one predicate which modifies vedma. The sentence "La Kim matma e sadji vedma", using "e" rather than "ce", would mean "Kim is a mother and wisely sells."

Other logical connectives are based on the elementary connectives "e", "a" and "o", along with the negation word "no". For example, logical implication is indicated by the word "noa". The word is chosen to make it easy for a Loglan speaker to see that "A noa B" is logically equivalent to "no A a B". Brown argues that it is thus easier in Loglan than in English to see that two sentences like these are different ways of saying the same thing:

- "La Kim ga sadji noa fa vedma da." = If Kim is wise, she will sell it.
- "La Kim ga no sadji a fa vedma da." = Kim is not wise, and/or she will sell it.

The conjunction "a" expresses the inclusive-or relation; that is, one of the two alternatives is true, or possibly both. The exclusive-or relation, in which only one of the alternatives is true, but not both, is expressed by a different word, "onoi". Again, the word is chosen to make clear the logical equivalence of "A o no B" and "A onoi B":

- "Tu fa titci o no tu fa morce." = You will eat if and only if you do not die.
- "Tu fa titci onoi tu fa morce." = You will eat, or you will die.

A special conjunction "ze" is used to create a "mixed" predicate which may be true even if it is not necessarily true for either of the component predicates. For example, "Le negda ga nigro ze blabi" means "The egg is black-and-white". This would be true if the egg were striped or speckled; in that case it would not be true that the egg is black nor that it is white. On the other hand, "Le negda ga nigro e blabi" would make the claim that "The egg is black and (it is also) white".

=== Attitude indicators ===
There is a set of words used for expressing attitudes about what one is saying, which convey conviction, intention, obligation and emotion. These words follow what they modify, but when used at the start of a sentence, they modify the entire sentence. For example:

- "Ae le matma pa sadji" = Hopefully, the mother was wise.
- "Ui le matma pa sadji" = Happily, the mother was wise.
- "Ou le matma pa sadji" = It doesn't matter whether the mother was wise.

== In popular culture ==
Loglan was mentioned in a couple of science fiction works: Robert A. Heinlein's well-known books, including The Moon Is a Harsh Mistress and The Number of the Beast, Robert Rimmer's utopian book Love Me Tomorrow (1978) and Stanisław Lem novel His Master's Voice.

Loglan's inventor, James Cooke Brown, also wrote a utopian science fiction novel called The Troika Incident (1970) that uses Loglan phrases but calls the language a different name, "Panlan".

Loglan is used as the official interspecies language in the roleplaying game FTL:2448.

== Archival collection ==
Archival material related to the creation and teaching of Loglan, including flashcards and grammar explanations, can be found in the Faith Rich Papers, located at Chicago Public Library Special Collections, Chicago, Illinois.

== See also ==
- Constructed language
- Linguistics
- Lojban
- Comparison between Lojban and Loglan
- Philosophy of language
- Sapir–Whorf hypothesis
- Faith Rich
