= James Cooke Brown =

American sociologist and novelist (1921–2000)

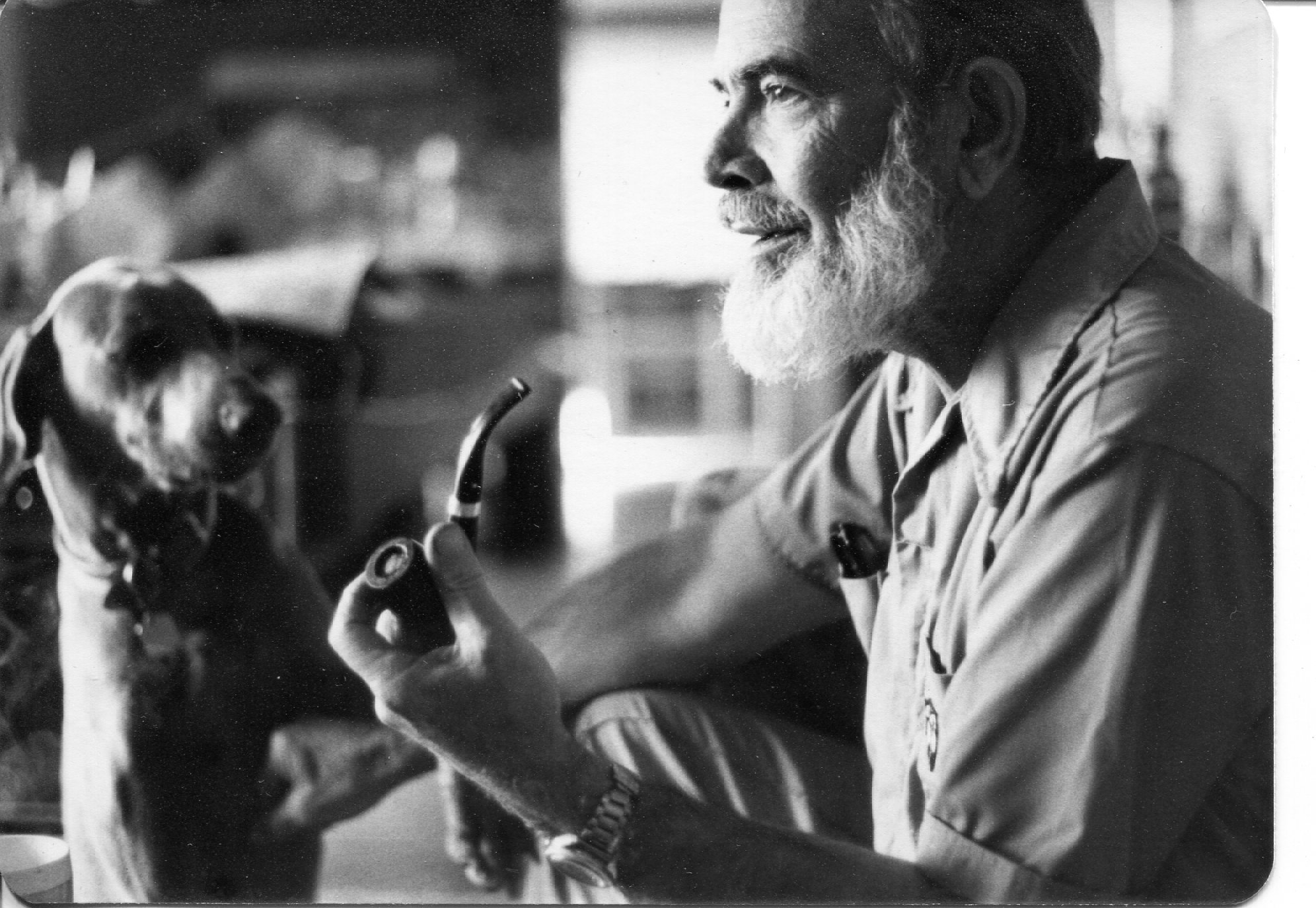
- Brown in 1979 in San Diego
- Born: July 21, 1921; Tagbilaran, Bohol, Philippine Islands
- Died: February 13, 2000 (aged 78); Tierra del Fuego, Argentina
- Education: B.A., University of Minnesota 1946, Ph.D., 1948
- Occupation: Linguistics
- Spouse(s): 1) Unknown name: Children: Jefferson O'Reilly, Jill O'Reilly; 2) Patsy; 3) Joy Fuller: Child Jennifer Fuller; 4) Evelyn Ruth Anderson. (4th wife) Evelyn Ruth Anderson
- Partners: 4: 1)unknown; 2)Patsy; 3)Joy Fuller; 4)Evelyn Ruth Anderson
- Children: 3: Jefferson O'Reilly, Jill O'Reilly, Jennifer Fuller
- Writing career
- Pen name: Jim Brown
- Genre: Science fiction

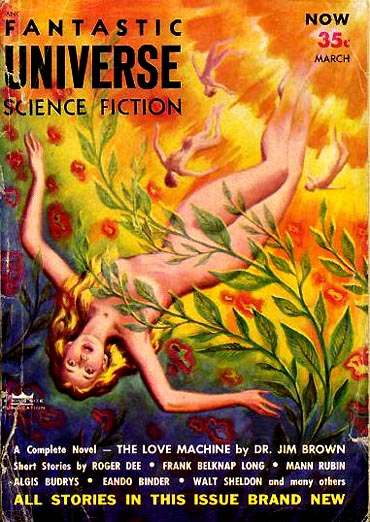
Brown's novella "The Love Machine" was cover-featured on the March 1954 issue of Fantastic Universe

James Cooke Brown (July 21, 1921 – February 13, 2000) was an American sociologist and science fiction author. He is notable for creating the constructed language Loglan and for designing the Parker Brothers board game Careers.

Brown's novel The Troika Incident (Doubleday, 1970) describes a worldwide free knowledge base similar to the Internet. The novel begins with the belief that the world is on the eve of self-destruction, but then it presents a world about a century from now which is a paradise of peace and prosperity, all based on ideas, movements, and knowledge presently available in the world. In its metafictional structure, the novel is a call for social change, not through revolution but through free education and the resilience of human ingenuity. Long out of print and relatively rare, an e-book version (Amazon Kindle) of the novel was released in 2012. The novel envisioned all books and periodicals being viewed on portable electronic devices called "readers" in the year 2070, when it is set.

Among his other achievements, Brown designed, and had built, a three-hulled sailboat, called a trimaran. He utilized this boat to sail to many parts of the world.

While on a South American cruise with his wife, Brown was admitted to a hospital in Argentina, where he died at the age of 78.

== Bibliography ==
=== Science fiction ===
- "The Emissary", Astounding Science Fiction
- The Love Machine, Fantastic Universe
- The Troika Incident: A Tetralogue In Two Parts, Doubleday, 1970

=== Sociology ===
- Cooperative group formation: a problem in social engineering, University of Minnesota, 1951
- The Job Market of the Future: Using Computers to Humanize Economies, James Cooke Brown, M.E. Sharpe, 2001, ISBN 978-0-7656-0733-1
- Paternity, Jokes and Song : A Possible Evolutionary Scenario for the Origin of Mind and Language, Brown J. C.; Greenhood W., 1983, vol. 8, no2, pp. 7–53 (5 p.), Journal of Social and Biological Structures, ISSN 0748-772X

=== Loglan ===
- Loglan 1: a logical language, James Cooke Brown, Loglan Institute, 1975
- Loglan 2: methods of construction, James Cooke Brown, Loglan Institute, University Microfilms, 1981
- Loglan 3: speaking Loglan : programmed textbook on the phonology, basic vocabulary, and grammar of the simple Loglan sentence, James Cooke Brown, Lujoye Fuller Brown, Loglan Institute, University Microfilms, 1965
- Loglan 4: a Loglan-English dictionary, James Cooke Brown, Lujoye Fuller Brown, Loglan Institute, 1970
- Loglan 5: an English-Loglan dictionary, James Cooke Brown, Lujoye Fuller Brown, Loglan Institute, University Microfilms, 1981
- Loglan 4 & 5: a Loglan-English/English-Loglan dictionary, James Cooke Brown, Loglan Institute, 1975
