= Bird language =

Bird language refers to birds' system of communication. It may also refer to:

- "The Bird Language", a short story by Pu Songling, first published in 1740, about a monk who can communicate with birds
- Language of the birds, a mythical language by which humans can communicate with birds
- "The Language of the Birds", a Russian fairy tale
- Turkish bird language, a whistled version of the Turkish language used by farmers to communicate over long distances
- An alternative name for aberrant languages as proposed by George W. Grace

== See also ==
- Language of the birds (disambiguation)
- The Secret Language of Birds, a 2000 progressive rock album by Ian Anderson
- Whistled language
