= Language and mythology =

Language and mythology may refer to:

- Mythical origins of language
- Divine language
- Language of the birds
- True name
