= Language of the birds (disambiguation) =

Language of the birds is in mythology, medieval literature and occultism, a mystical, perfect or divine language, or a mythical or magical language used by birds to communicate with the initiated.

Language of the birds is an informal reference to the communication systems of birds.

Language of the Birds may also refer to:

- "Language of the birds", a reference to the artificial language zaum of Russian Futurists
- "Language of the Birds" (Sprache der Vögel), a 1989 sculpture by Anselm Kiefer
- The Language of the Birds, a Russian fairy tale
- The Language of the Birds (Die Sprache der Vögel), a 1991 German film
- The Language of the Birds (Die Sprache der Vögel), a 1911 wedding march by Jean Sibelius to a play by Adolf Paul
- The Language of Birds, a children's opera by composer John Kennedy and librettist Peter M. Krask
- Turkish bird language, a whistled language

== See also ==
- The Secret Language of Birds, an Ian Anderson album
