= Adamic language =

Language spoken by Adam in the Garden of Eden

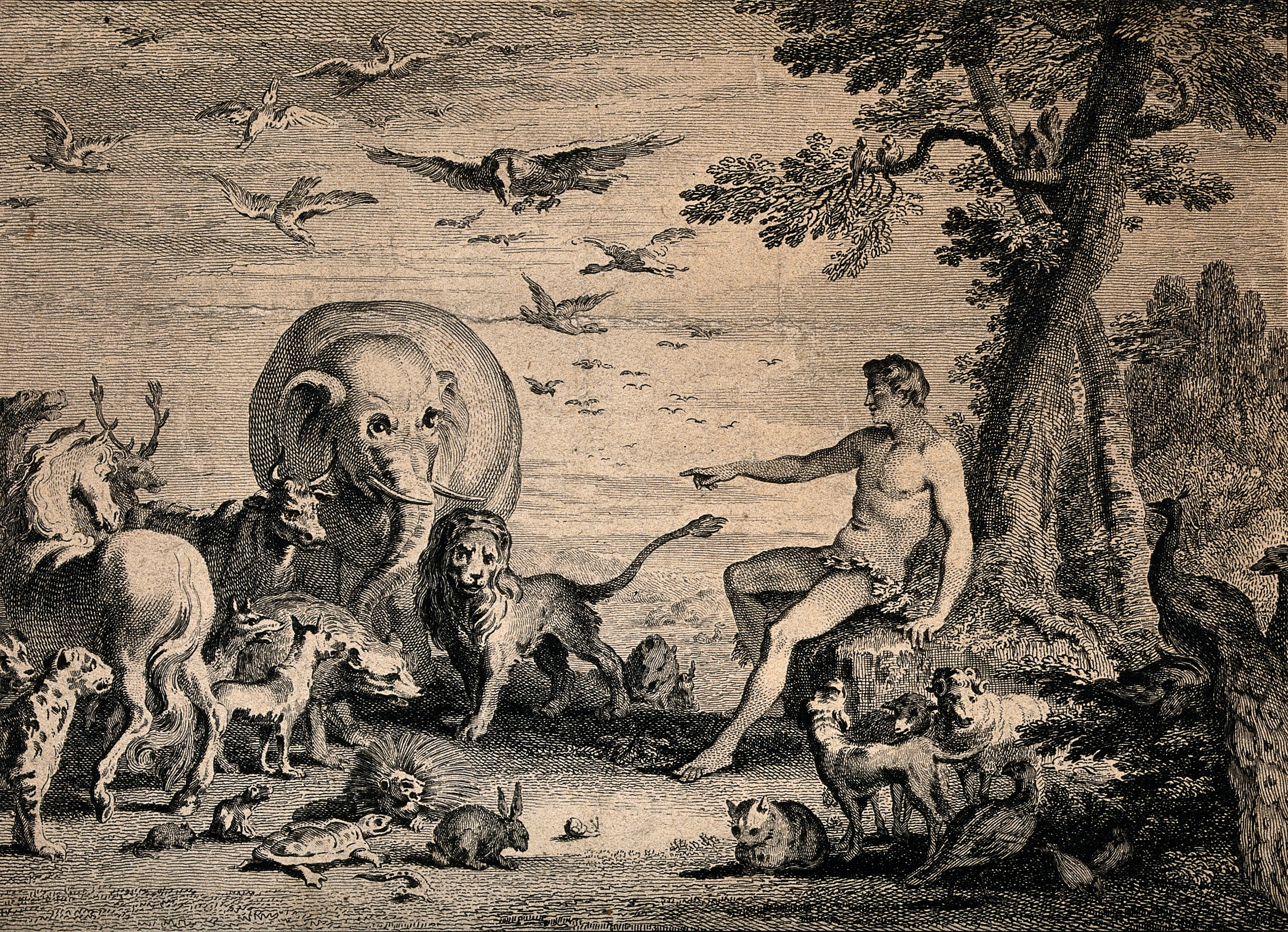
Adam naming the animals as described in Genesis. In some interpretations, he uses the “Adamic language” to do so.

The Adamic language, according to Abraham Abulafia and some Christians, is the language spoken by Adam (and possibly Eve) in the Garden of Eden. It is variously interpreted as either the language used by God to address Adam (the divine language), or the language invented by Adam with which he named all things (including Eve), as in the second Genesis creation narrative (Genesis 2:19).

In the Middle Ages, various Jewish commentators held that Adam spoke Hebrew, a view also addressed in various ways by the late medieval Italian poet Dante Alighieri. In the early modern period, some authors continued to discuss the possibility of an Adamic language, some continuing to hold to the idea that it was Hebrew, while others such as John Locke were more skeptical. According to Ethiopian and Eritrean traditions, the ancient Semitic language of Geʽez is the language of Adam, the first and original language. More recently, a variety of Mormon authors have expressed various opinions about the nature of the Adamic language.

== Patristic period ==
Augustine addresses the issue in The City of God. While not explicit, the implication of there being but one human language prior to the Tower of Babel's collapse is that the language, which was preserved by Heber and his son Peleg, and which is recognized as the language passed down to Abraham and his descendants, is the language that would have been used by Adam.

== Middle Ages ==
Traditional Jewish exegesis such as Midrash says that Adam spoke the Hebrew language because the names he gives Eve – Isha and Chava – only make sense in Hebrew. By contrast, Abraham Abulafia (1240–1291) assumed that the language spoken in Paradise had been different from Hebrew, and rejected the claim then-current also among Christian authors, that a child left unexposed to linguistic stimulus would automatically begin to speak in Hebrew.

Both Muslim and Christian Arabs, such as Sulayman al-Ghazzi, considered Syriac the language spoken by Adam and Eve.

Umberto Eco (1993) notes that Genesis is ambiguous on whether the language of Adam was preserved by Adam's descendants until the confusion of tongues, or if it began to evolve naturally even before Babel.

Dante Alighieri addresses the topic in his De vulgari eloquentia (1302–1305). He argues that the Adamic language is of divine origin and therefore unchangeable. He also notes that according to Genesis, the first speech act is due to Eve, addressing the serpent, and not to Adam. Paracelsus believed in an Adamic language, as did Johann Reuchlin.

In his Divine Comedy (c. 1308–1320), however, Dante changes his view to another that treats the Adamic language as the product of Adam. This had the consequence that it could no longer be regarded as immutable, and hence Hebrew could not be regarded as identical with the language of Paradise. Dante concludes (Paradiso XXVI) that Hebrew is a derivative of the language of Adam. In particular, the chief Hebrew name for God in scholastic tradition, El, must be derived of a different Adamic name for God, which Dante gives as I.

== Early modern period ==
=== Proponents ===
Elizabethan scholar John Dee makes references to a language he called "Angelical", which he recorded in his private journals and those of scryer Edward Kelley. Dee's journals did not describe the language as "Enochian", instead preferring "Angelical", the "Celestial Speech", the "Language of Angels", the "First Language of God-Christ", the "Holy Language", or "Adamical" because, according to Dee's Angels, it was used by Adam in Paradise to name all things. The language was later dubbed Enochian, due to Dee's assertion that the Biblical Patriarch Enoch had been the last human (before Dee and Kelley) to know the language.

Dutch physician, linguist, and humanist Johannes Goropius Becanus (1519–1572) theorized in Origines Antwerpianae (1569) that Antwerpian Babrantic, spoken in the region between the Scheldt and Meuse Rivers, was the original language spoken in Paradise. Goropius believed that the most ancient language on Earth would be the simplest language, and that the simplest language would contain mostly short words. Since Brabantic has a higher number of short words than do Latin, Greek, and Hebrew, Goropius reasoned that it was the older language. His work influenced that of Simon Stevin (1548–1620), who espoused similar ideas in "Uytspraeck van de weerdicheyt der Duytse tael", a chapter in De Beghinselen Der Weeghconst (1586).

By the 17th century, Adamic was the most popular theory of the nature of language.

=== Opponents ===
The existence and nature of the alleged Adamic language was commonly discussed amongst European Jewish and Christian mystics and primitive linguists. Robert Boyle (1627–1691) was skeptical that Hebrew was the language best capable of describing the nature of things, stating:

I could never find, that the Hebrew names of animals, mentioned in the beginning of Genesis, argued a (much) clearer insight into their natures, than did the names of the same or some other animals in Greek, or other languages (1665:45).

John Locke (1632–1704) expressed similar skepticism in his An Essay Concerning Human Understanding (1690).

== Modern period ==
=== Latter Day Saint movement ===
Joseph Smith, founder of the Latter Day Saint movement, in his revision of the Bible, declared the Adamic language to have been "pure and undefiled". Some Mormons believe it to be the language of God. Glossolalia, or speaking in tongues, was commonplace in the early years of the movement, and it was commonly believed that the incomprehensible language spoken during these incidents was the language of Adam. However, this belief seems to have never been formally or officially adopted.

Some other early Latter Day Saint leaders, including Brigham Young, Orson Pratt, and Elizabeth Ann Whitney, claimed to have received several words in the Adamic language by revelation. Some Latter Day Saints believe that the Adamic language is the "pure language" spoken of by Zephaniah and that it will be restored as the universal language of humankind at the end of the world.

Apostle Orson Pratt declared that "Ahman", part of the name of the settlement "Adam-ondi-Ahman" in Daviess County, Missouri, was the name of God in the Adamic language. An 1832 handwritten page from the Joseph Smith Papers, titled "A Sample of the Pure Language", and reportedly dictated by Smith to "Br. Johnson", asserts that the name of God is Awman.

The Latter Day Saint endowment prayer circle once included use of the words "Pay Lay Ale". These untranslated words are no longer used in temple ordinances and have been replaced by an English version, "O God, hear the words of my mouth". Some believe that the "Pay Lay Ale" sentence is derived from the Hebrew phrase "pe le-El" (פה לאל), "mouth to God". "Pay Lay Ale" was identified in the temple ceremony as words from the "pure Adamic language".

Other words thought by some Latter Day Saints to derive from the Adamic language include deseret ("honey bee") and Ahman ("God").

The Book of Moses refers to "a book of remembrance" written in the language of Adam.

=== Goidelic languages ===
Nicholas Wolf writes that 19th-century Irish language speakers and publications claim that Irish (or some Goidelic language) is a language of Biblical primacy comparable to Hebrew, with some claiming it was the language of Adam.

== In popular culture ==
In the videogame Indiana Jones and the Great Circle, the language Adamic is discovered by the protagonist as an early human language spoken by giants, which was adapted into Egyptian and Sumerian in ancient times. It is also represented on stone tablets, resembling logographic writing systems of the early Bronze Age.

== See also ==
- History of linguistics
- Mythical origins of language
- Origin of language
- Proto-Human language
- Universal language
- Enochian
- Sacred language

== Bibliography ==
- Allison P. Coudert (ed.), The Language of Adam = Die Sprache Adams, Wiesbaden: Harrassowitz, 1999.
- Angelo Mazzocco, Linguistic Theories in Dante and the Humanists, (chapter 9: "Dante's Reappraisal of the Adamic language", 159–181).
- Umberto Eco, The Search for the Perfect Language (1993).
