= Zum schwarzen Ferkel =

Coordinates: 52.5164°N 13.3808°E

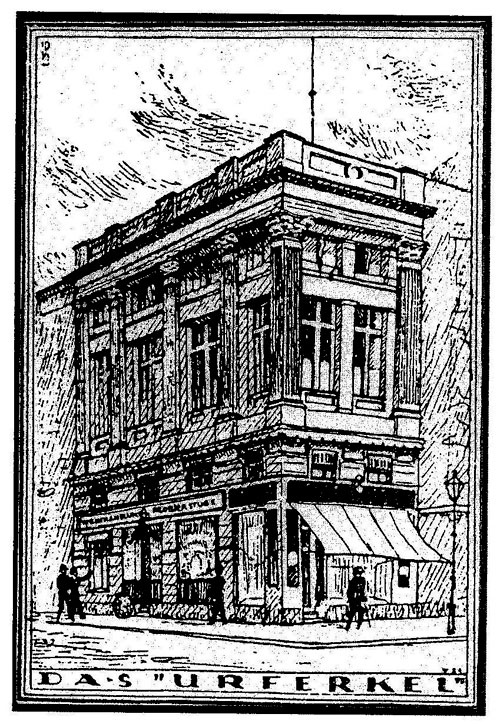
The original building with the tavern.

Zum schwarzen Ferkel ("The Black Piglet") was a tavern located at the corner of Unter den Linden and Neue Wilhelmstraße in Berlin. Said once to have been frequented by Heinrich Heine, Robert Schumann and E. T. A. Hoffmann, it was in the 1890s the meeting place for a circle of mainly Nordic writers and artists, including August Strindberg, Holger Drachmann and Edvard Munch but also the Pole Stanisław Przybyszewski and several Germans.

== Armenian or Bessarabian wine-sack over the entrance ==
The real name of the Weinstube, which was owned by a Gustav Türke, was Gustav Türkes Weinhandlung und Probierstube, but it was also known as "The Cloister". The name Zum schwarzen Ferkel was given to it by Strindberg as he thought the Armenian (or Bessarabian) wine-sack hanging over the entrance resembled a black piglet; the name was enthusiastically accepted by the owner.

== Strindberg's migration to Berlin following his divorce ==
Strindberg had come to Berlin from Sweden in 1892, after his divorce the previous year from his first wife Siri von Essen, on the invitation of the Swedish writer Ola Hansson and his wife, the critic Laura Marholm, and for the first period in Berlin he stayed with the couple in their home in Friedrichshagen. After a while he started to refer to the place in letters as "Friedrichshölle" ("Friedrichs-Hell") and eventually moved into central Berlin, falling out with this former hosts in the process, and settling at a pension on Neue Wilhelmstrasse, close to Türke's tavern.

The story of Strindberg's discovery and naming of the tavern comes from the Finnish writer Adolf Paul, and the circle at the Ferkel originally consisted of Strindberg, Paul, the German writer Richard Dehmel, the physician Carl Ludwig Schleich, the Polish journalist Stanisław Przybyszewski and a few others, all of whom had previously belonged to the group frequenting Ola Hansson's home in Friedrichshagen. Other Scandinavians arriving in Berlin would join the group. Edvard Munch became a regular after he had arrived in Berlin in October 1892 in connection with an exhibition that was scandalously closed after only seven days. The Norwegian writer Gunnar Heiberg became a member of the circle in November; other Norwegians included the painter couple Christian and Oda Krohg, the writer Axel Maurer and the poet Gabriel Finne. A quarrel between Munch and the Danish poet Holger Drachmann caused Strindberg temporarily to leave the group. He started seeing the Austrian journalist Frida Uhl, soon to be his second wife. After the couple had become secretly engaged and Frida Uhl had left Berlin temporarily for Munich, Strindberg returned to the Ferkel. Meanwhile Munch had introduced another female member of the group, the Norwegian music student Dagny Juel. Several of the men were attracted by Dagny Juel, who entered into a number of brief sexual liaisons within the circle, including a three-week relationship in March 1893 with the newly engaged Strindberg while Frida Uhl was still away. Juel married Przybyszewski on 18 August 1893; she later wrote some literary pieces and was murdered by a lover in Tbilisi in 1901. Munch, who was in love with her, felt betrayed, and he depicted her on several paintings; she is likely to be the model for his Jealousy.

== Literary depictions ==
The main written testimonies to come out of the Ferkel circle was Adolf Paul's Strindberg-Erinnerungen und -Briefe (1914) and Strindberg's novel Klostret ("The Cloister") which was published only posthumously in 1966.
