= Oldest language =

"Oldest language" may refer to:

- the emergence of language itself in human evolution
  - origin of language
  - proto-language, a stage before the emergence of language proper
  - mythical origins of language
- a Proto-human language, the hypothetical, most recent common ancestor of all the world's languages
- the date of attestation in writing (epigraphy).
  - see list of languages by first written accounts.
- the conservative nature of a given language (low rate of language change, viz. "old" in the sense of "has not changed much for a long time"), see
  - glottochronology
  - historical linguistics
