= The Bird Language =

- Short story by Pu Songling
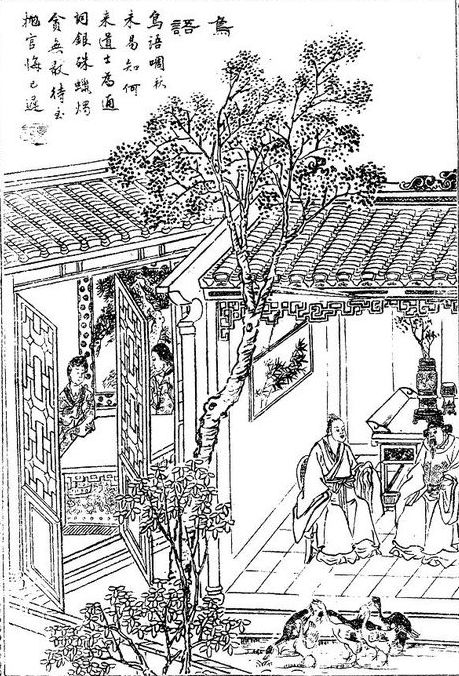
- 19th-century illustration from Xiangzhu liaozhai zhiyi tuyong (Liaozhai Zhiyi with commentary and illustrations; 1886)
- Original title: 鸟语 (Niaoyu)
- Translator: Sidney L. Sondergard (2008)
- Country: China
- Language: Chinese
- Genres: Zhiguai; Chuanqi; Short story

Publication
- Published in: Strange Tales from a Chinese Studio
- Publication date: 1740

Chronology
Princess Yunluo (云萝公主)	The Heavenly Palace (天宫)

"The Bird Language" (simplified Chinese: 鸟语; traditional Chinese: 鳥語; pinyin: Niǎo yǔ) is a short story by Pu Songling, first published in Strange Tales from a Chinese Studio (1740). It is a brief anecdote about a Taoist monk who can communicate with birds, which has been suggested to be a criticism of the corrupt bureaucracy in Pu's time.

== Plot ==
An alms-begging Taoist monk is at a house in Zhongzhou (中州); after hearing the birdsong of an oriole, he cautions his host about fire hazards, claiming that the bird foretold a fire at the house. The host is incredulous but true enough, a fire breaks out the next day and engulfs numerous other houses in the vicinity. Next, the monk correctly predicts that there would soon be the birth of twins in the area – but also that both would quickly die. Impressed by his ability to communicate with birds, the county magistrate hosts the monk and requests that he decipher what some ducks were saying. The monk again accurately conveys that the magistrate had marital strife to overcome. Subsequently, the monk alludes to the magistrate's corruption, before warning him that he would be "Fired!"; incensed, the official sends the monk on his way, but is indeed found guilty of embezzlement and bribe-taking.

== Background ==
Originally titled "Niaoyu" (鳥語), "The Bird Language" was first published in Pu Songling's 18th-century anthology Strange Tales from a Chinese Studio and was fully translated into English in the fifth volume of Sidney L. Sondergard's Strange Tales from Liaozhai in 2008. The main theme of the story is the language of the birds. Fanfan Chen compares "The Bird Language" to a similar anecdote in Confucius's Analects, in which "his disciple Gong Ye Chang saves his life because he understands birds' language"; in Pu's story, the Taoist master's ability to speak with birds is seen as a sign of his wisdom. Ma Zhenfang describes the story as an attempt to "antagonise" and criticise corrupt officials.
