= Princess Yunluo =

Short story by Pu Songling

- Short story by Pu Songling
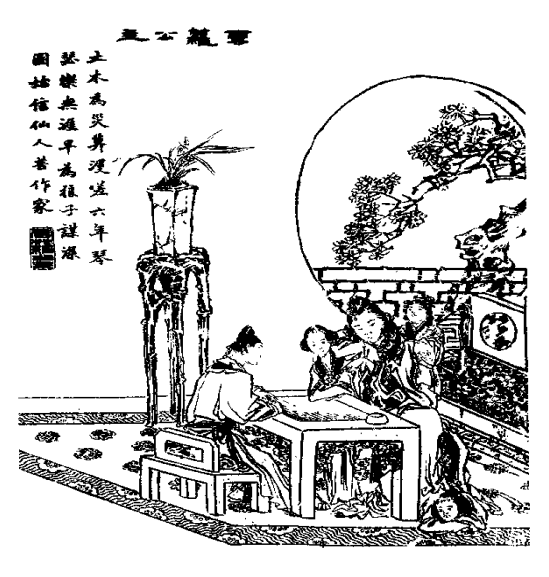
- 19th-century illustration from Xiangzhu liaozhai zhiyi tuyong (Liaozhai Zhiyi with commentary and illustrations; 1886)
- Original title: 云萝公主 (Yunluo Gongzhu)
- Translator: Sidney L. Sondergard (2008)
- Country: China
- Language: Chinese
- Genres: Zhiguai; Chuanqi; Short story

Publication
- Published in: Strange Tales from a Chinese Studio
- Publication date: 1740

Chronology
| The Caves of Mount Chaya (查牙山洞) | The Bird Language (鸟语) |

"Princess Yunluo" (simplified Chinese: 云萝公主; traditional Chinese: 雲蘿公主; pinyin: Yúnluó gōngzhǔ) is a short story by Pu Songling, first published in Strange Tales from a Chinese Studio (1740). The story follows the misadventures of An Daye — after the titular princess enters his life — and subsequently those of his two sons.

== Plot ==
Lulong native An Daye (安大业) is born with the ability to speak, although he soon loses it after his mother feeds him dog's blood. An grows up to become an eligible bachelor and his mother receives a revelation in her dreams that he will marry a princess. One day, a divine princess by the name of Yunluo appears in An's bedroom along with her housemaid, who announces that the king has decreed that An will be his son-in-law. The princess proceeds to play a game of weiqi with An; she wins in just thirty moves. They begin a second game, wherein An is offered a handicap of six black stones. After An blunders, the princess offers him a thousand taels to refurbish his house before she moves in, although her housemaid adds that he should only do so the following month. Princess Yunluo then signals that she is leaving, and An unsuccessfully attempts to stop her from doing so.

An recounts the strange episode to his mother, who dismisses it as demonic activity. Nonetheless, he proceeds with the renovation of his house — ignoring the advice to wait for a month — and finds himself constantly thinking of the princess. A month later, An bumps into Luanzhou scholar Yuan Dayong (袁大用) whom he, being an introvert, had been avoiding. However, An quickly warms up to Yuan upon seeing how polite and well-dressed he is. An invites him to his place and Yuan returns the courtesy the following day. Yuan instructs his preadolescent boy servant to carry an inebriated An home; the two men begin to meet more frequently and their friendship blossoms. Known for his generosity, Yuan gifts An with ten pairs of ivory chopsticks, red sandalwood prayer beads, and five thousand silver taels, the last of which An rejects.

One month later, an official in Laoting has his house looted by bandits. Yuan is contacted to draft an arrest warrant for them. An is accused of being the perpetrator by his neighbour Tu (屠), who has a vendetta against the An family; as An is absent when the army arrives at his house, An's mother is arrested and detained instead. She completely loses her appetite out of fright and although she is released some three days later, she is unable to recover from the ordeal and dies. An and his servants are arrested at her burial. Convinced that An has been falsely implicated, however, the county magistrate lets An go and arranges for his protection.

An is escorted by guards who, having been bribed by Tu, intend to assassinate him but are mauled to death by a tiger just as they are about to push An off a cliff. The tiger fetches An to a pavilion where he is reunited with Princess Yunluo, who gives him ten buttons for his protection. On his way home, An encounters a flustered Yuan who tells him: "The men I killed were unjust, and what I took from them they didn't deserve. Otherwise, I wouldn't even pick up money that'd been lost by the side of a road. You taught me that people can genuinely behave admirably, so why should people like your neighbour remain living in the world!" (Note: In Chinese: "某所杀皆不义之人，所取皆非义之财。不然，即遗于路者，不拾也。 君教我固自佳，然如君家邻，岂可留在人间耶!")

Completing his mother's funeral rites, An becomes a recluse. One day, his neighbour's entire household, bar a housemaid, is massacred by unknown assailants who demonstrate supernatural abilities as flying past rooftops and over walls. The maid reports the crime the following day and the magistrate summons An, the prime suspect, to court. However, An invokes the power of the buttons that the princess had given him, and the magistrate is compelled to exonerate him. An becomes even more socially withdrawn while awaiting the return of Princess Yunluo. She finally arrives at his courtyard three years later, and lectures An for renovating his house too quickly. She offers him a choice between playing weiqi and having sex; he chooses the latter even though it means spending only six years with her, as opposed to thirty years with the former option.

The days pass quickly and Yunluo — via a housemaid wearing her clothes and undergarments — gives birth to a boy she names Daqi (大器; literally "Great Instrument") on account of his auspicious countenance. She tells An that she wishes to visit her parents and therefore will be gone for three days. However, owing to the time difference between heaven and Earth, two-and-a-half years elapse before the princess returns. In that time, An has become a juren, but ditches his academic aspirations after they are belittled by Yunluo. After a few more trips back home, the princess gives birth to another son whom she curses at. An rejects his wife's plea for their second child to be abandoned, and names him Keqi (可弃; literally "Can Be Abandoned").

Princess Yunluo desperately tries to marry her son off to no avail and she bitterly remarks that he will ruin others' lives for six or seven years. An is instructed by his wife to agree to Keqi's betrothal with a daughter in the Hou (侯) household who will be born four years later with a wart on her left armpit. The princess then leaves and never returns. Daqi grows up to be a successful scholar, marrying into the Yun (云) family, whereas Keqi leads a life of crime. Embittered by his father's favouritism towards his brother, Keqi decides to murder Daqi but mistakenly wounds Daqi's wife. Before absconding, he also unsuccessfully attempts to kill An Daye. Grief-stricken, An soon dies and Keqi returns home to reconcile with his brother. They become estranged again after Keqi sues Daqi for having a more bountiful share of the family farmland than him. However, recalling his mother's words, Daqi still sees to it that Keqi marries Hou.

Hou establishes a hold on her husband, dictating for how long he may leave the house. A year later, she gives birth to a son and asserts financial independence. Keqi tries to sneak out but is caught by his wife, who slices off a large chunk of his buttocks and throws him out of the house. Humiliated, Keqi pleads with both his brother and sister-in-law for sympathy but is given the cold shoulder. Rushing back home with a spear, he threatens to murder Hou but is frightened off as soon as he sees her. Daqi intercedes on his broken brother's behalf and Keqi makes amends with Hou. Having renounced his old way of life, Keqi becomes a thoroughly henpecked husband, even at age 70 with many children and grandchildren. In his postscript, Pu Songling comments on the shrew and appends two other profiles of scholars with assertive wives.

== Publication history ==
Originally titled "Yunluo Gongzhu" (雲蘿公主), "Princess Yunluo" was probably written somewhere between 1691 and 1693, and first published in Pu Songling's 18th-century anthology Strange Tales from a Chinese Studio and was fully translated into French by Pierre Daudin in 1938 with the assistance of "two Chinese scholars and a Vietnamese collator". The French translation of "Yunluo Gongzhu" was first included in the thirteenth volume of Bulletin des Etudes Indochinoises and subsequently in a 1940 Saigon publication titled Cinquantes contes chinois extraits du Leao-tchai Tche-yi. The story was fully translated into English as "Princess Yunluo" in the fifth volume of Sidney L. Sondergard's Strange Tales from Liaozhai published in 2008.

== Literary significance and analysis ==
A shrewish wife and a jealous woman are like abscesses against the bone that terminate only with death—aren't they poisonous? Now arsenic and wolfsbane are the best poisons on earth. If one can use them, they'll effect a great cure that ginseng and immortal fungus (lingzhi) can't match. Yet who but a goddess with penetrating vision would dare dose her children with toxic medicine?

— Pu's postscript

Kevin McMahon notes that the shrew is a recurring motif in Strange Tales, citing "Princess Yunluo" and other stories like "Ma Jiefu" and "The Raksha Kingdom" as examples of Pu's "(joining) ranks with fellow men in a collective sigh about the intolerable woman". Qing dynasty critic Feng Zhenluan (冯镇峦) writes that the "best thing that could happen in this world" is when a shrew gets punished, whereas Feng's contemporary Dan Minglun (但明倫) rebukes the spineless man — the foil to the shrew in Pu's stories — for being "unmanly". On the other hand, Yenna Wu argues that, like in his vernacular play Incantation Against Jealousy (禳妒咒), "Princess Yunluo" is offering a "positive portrayal of domestic prison ... in which (a scoundrel's wife) is the warder".

Extending upon Wu's analysis, Judith Zeitlin credits Pu with the invention of the "benign shrew" who "paradoxically brings blessings rather than disaster to a household", unlike the "stereotypical" virago that appears in other Strange Tales entries as "Ma Jiefu" and "Jiang Cheng". She observes that in "Princess Yunluo", Pu challenges the view that there is an "absolute" division between the "two traditions of female transgression of gender boundaries", that is "the hero among women" and the shrew.
