= The Caves of Mount Chaya =

- Short story by Pu Songling
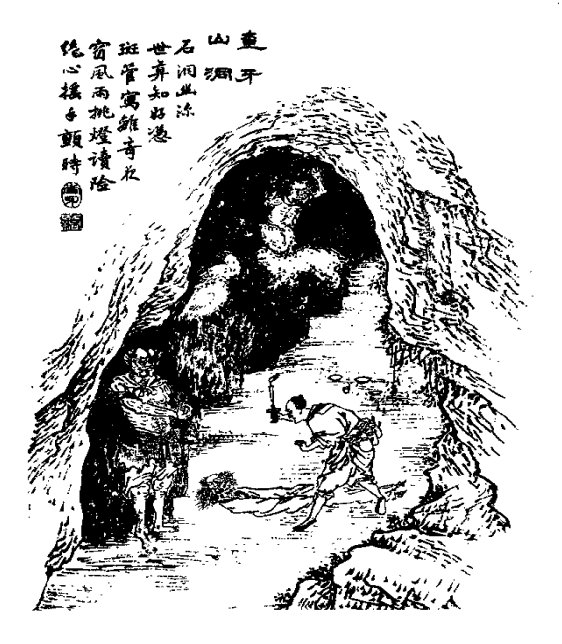
- 19th-century illustration from Xiangzhu liaozhai zhiyi tuyong (Liaozhai Zhiyi with commentary and illustrations; 1886)
- Original title: 查牙山洞 (Chaya Shandong)
- Translator: Sidney L. Sondergard (2008)
- Country: China
- Language: Chinese
- Genres: Zhiguai; Chuanqi; Short story

Publication
- Published in: Strange Tales from a Chinese Studio
- Publication date: 1740

Chronology
Yang Dahong (杨大洪)	Princess Yunluo (云萝公主)

"The Caves of Mount Chaya" (Chinese: 查牙山洞; pinyin: Cháya shāndong) is a short story by Pu Songling, first published in Strange Tales from a Chinese Studio (1740).

== Plot ==
While celebrating the Chong Yang Festival in Zhangqiu, three villagers decide to explore a cave in Mount Chaya (查牙山). Two of them retreat upon approaching the unilluminated part of the cave, but the third man goes ahead. He encounters stalactites and other speleothems that remind him of various wild beasts and demons. He is especially frightened at the sight of what seems like a stone demon but is reassured by the ash that he sees on the ground — a sign that somebody else had recently visited the cave. However, he then spots the corpse of a young woman; just as he is examining it, his torch goes out. Panicking, he makes an about-turn but knocks his head against a rock on his way out and passes out.

As some time has elapsed, the other two villagers return to check on their compatriot, only to discover him unconscious and with a bloodied head. Too afraid to rescue him on their own, they enlist the help of two more men; he regains consciousness a few hours later and recounts his harrowing experience. Upon learning of this, the county magistrate orders the cave entrance to be sealed.

In the epilogue, during the twenty-sixth or twenty-seventh year of the Kangxi Emperor, a Daoist priest claiming to be a disciple of Zhongli Quan enters the cave (a new entrance had been discovered after the collapse of the southern cliff face in Yangmu Valley) (Note: It is unknown where "Yangmu Valley" (养母峪) refers to.) to purify it but is impaled on a stalagmite. Thereafter, the magistrate has the cave permanently sealed off.

== Publication history ==
Originally titled "Chaya Shandong" (查牙山洞), the story was first published in Pu Songling's 18th-century anthology Strange Tales from a Chinese Studio. It was fully translated into English as "The Zhaya (sic) Mountain Cave" in the fifth volume of Sidney L. Sondergard's Strange Tales from Liaozhai published in 2008.

== Literary significance and analysis ==
The French commentator Jacques Dar notes that the story (rendered in French as "La Grotte du mont Chaya") uses the motif of a cave to create an atmosphere creepier than the visual stimuli encountered by the man inside the cave; no supernatural activity is actually described, but Pu uses the power of suggestion to make both the protagonist and the reader feel otherwise. Lei Qunming (雷群明) praises Pu's use of blank verse to conjure a cave environment that is both awe-inspiring and creepy.
