= Isiguqo =

Southern African syncretic prayer practice

Isiguqo (Zulu language: place for kneeling) is a religious practice derived from the Zulu traditional religion. It originally refers to a kneeling place on a holy hill which is approached by crawling towards it, and where a profoundly dignified prayer is performed. It has been adapted by syncretic religious movements in Southern Africa such as the Nazareth Baptist Church, which uses this term to describe a kneeling prayer performed in times of hardship.

In some Zionist churches, isiguqo manifests as a prayer circle where dancing and healing takes place, and is regarded as a major form of worship. During the ceremony, members holding flags and staffs kneel reverently with their attention fixed on the preacher, who stands up positioned at the center of the circle.

== See also ==
- Religious syncretism
