= Wurruri =

South Australian Aboriginal myth

In the Aboriginal mythology of the Encounter Bay tribe, in Australia, Wurruri is an old woman who appears in the myth of how the different languages came about.

The story appeared in "The Manners and Customs of the Aborigines of the Encounter Bay Tribe" by Rev A. Meyer.
