= Laura Marholm =

Baltic German author

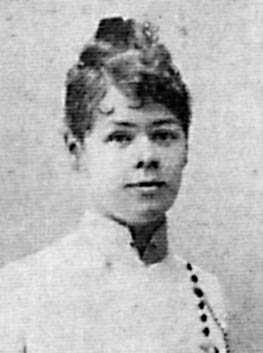
- Born: Laura Mohr; 1854; Latvia
- Died: 1928 (aged 73–74); Latvia
- Other name: Leonhard Marholm
- Occupation: Writer
- Known for: Feminist works

Laura Katharina Marholm (1854–1928) was a Baltic-German writer of literary criticism, biographies about women, and novels. The main characters in her novels were women who felt fulfilled in marriage. Marholm was a New Woman feminist that wrote about feminist issues. Due to some of her beliefs, some other feminists did not consider Marholm to be among them. She believed that literature could be used to help gender relations. Some of Marholm's works were part of "feminist literary criticism" known as gynocriticism, 70 years before the term was coined, with much of that work being focused on Nordic women authors.

== Personal life ==
Marholm was born Laura Mohr in 1854 in Riga, Latvia. Her mother was a German emigrant, and her father was a Danish sea captain. She received an education and was taught how to be a teacher. Marholm later taught Baltic history to other women. While using the pen name Leonhard Marholm, she wrote theatre reviews, articles, author biographies, and newspaper writings. Marholm became the first Latvian national playwright when she wrote her first play at 24 years old. She married the Swedish writer Ola Hansson, and they moved to Germany. She died in 1928 in Latvia.

== Works ==
Marholm's book Wir Frauen and unsere Dichter (1895) examined works that were written by men to determine what was considered masculine about women. Six Modern Women: Psychological Sketches, a non-fiction book of biographies, was also published in 1895 and was translated into Swedish, Norwegian, English, Dutch, Russian, Polish, Czech, and Italian. Three of the women who were written about within the work were Anne Charlotte Edgren Leffler, Amalie Skram, and Sonja Kovalevsky. There was backlash against Six Modern Women because of traditional gender roles, with feedback that included "an absurd book" and "pathological eroto-mania". Marholm's book Studies in the Psychology of Woman (1897) was about multiple women from Scandinavia. Some of Marholm's works were part of "feminist literary criticism" known as gynocriticism, 70 years before the term was coined, with much of that work being focused on Nordic women authors.

Marholm believed that literature could be used to improve gender relations. Marholm stated, "People used to talk about the role that the novel played in women's lives. It is time to reverse the issue. Let us now open our eyes to the role women's lives play in the novel." In her novels, Marholm writes about human characteristics such as perversions and morbidities. It was Marholm's belief that "a woman's life begins and ends with man" and that "it is he who makes a woman of her". Marholm's female characters felt fulfilled in marriage.

Marholm's work was often controversial, and she was referred to as anti-feminist by other feminists. Marholm's thoughts about women needing a man's love were believed to be against the political rights of women. Her works were often read by men as well as women who lacked an education. Despite the criticism, she was a New Woman feminist. Marholm also translated Scandinavian works into German.
