= Ola Hansson =

Swedish poet, prose writer, and critic

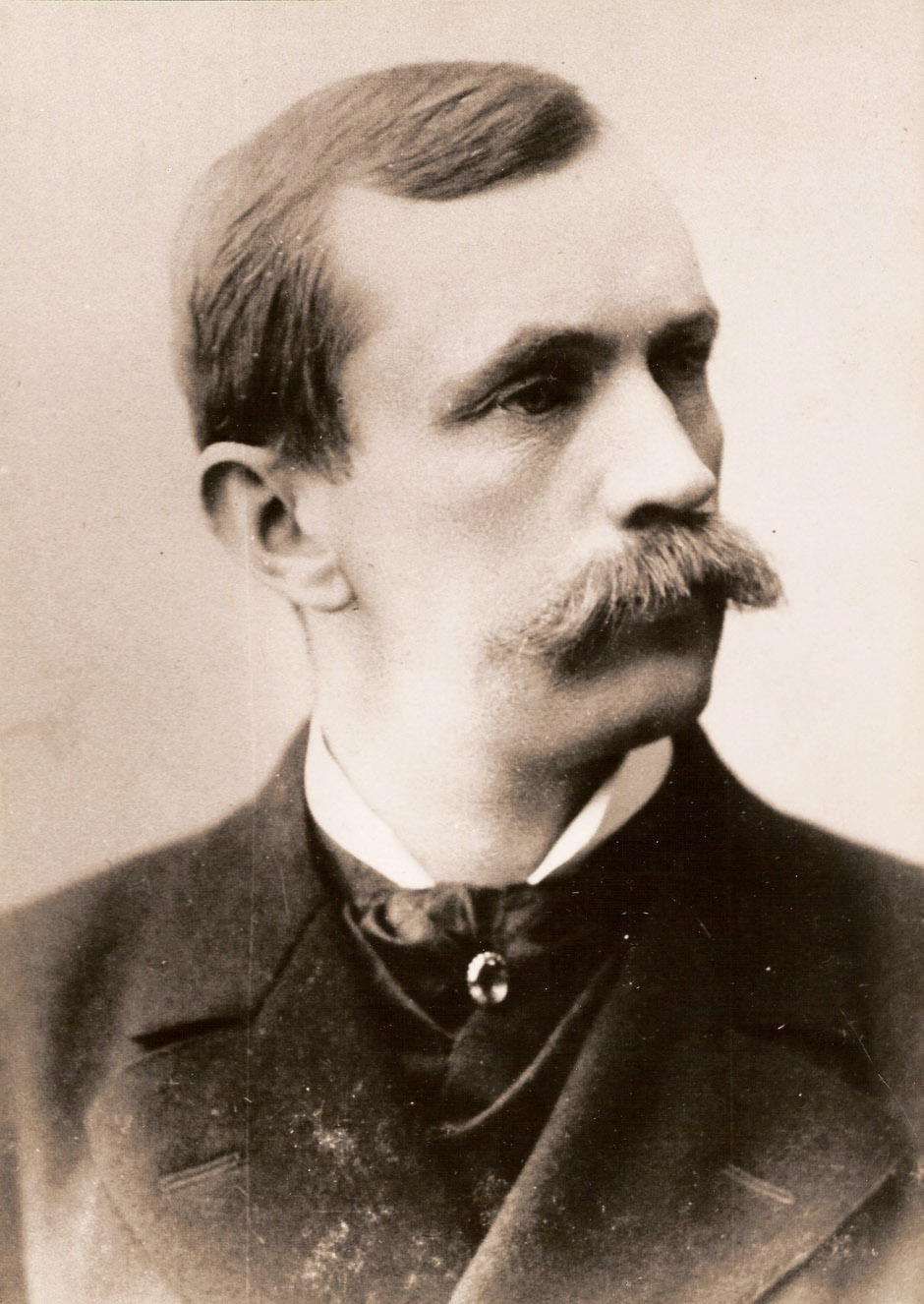
- Ola Hansson
- Born: 12 November 1860; Hönsinge, Sweden
- Died: 26 September 1925; Büyükdere, Turkey
- Education: Lund University
- Occupations: Poet, prose writer, critic

Ola Hansson (12 November 1860, Hönsinge, Sweden – 26 September 1925, Büyükdere, Turkey) was a Swedish poet, prose writer, and critic.

== Biography ==
Hansson graduated from Lund University in 1882, with a B.A in philosophy and the humanities. Hansson published his first works, Dikter ("Poems") in 1884 and Notturno in 1885. In those he expressed a celebration of the natural beauty and folk culture of his native province Skåne, southern Sweden. The refined poetry did not fit the Swedish realism of the 1880s-90s and gained little attention. Hansson followed up with the decadent Sensitiva Amorosa (1887), a collection of morbid, erotic sketches that shocked the Sweden of his day. The reaction from the public was harsh, and Hansson left his country for Germany in 1889. He would then continue to live abroad for the remainder of his life, in countries such as Switzerland and Turkey (where he also died).

== Ideas and works ==
In the period following the notorious Sensitiva Amorosa (1887) he proclaimed himself an adherent of Nietzschean ideas, a view he made public with the cycle of poems Ung Ofegs visor (1892). These were in turn translated into English by George Egerton and published by John Lane under the title of Young Ofeg's Ditties (1895). Here he voiced his contempt of the general crowd and belief in the Übermensch. Hansson, together with Georg Brandes was instrumental in calling attention to Nietzsche's works in Germany, and he also helped publicize Strindberg's work in German magazines at a point when the latter was not appreciated in Sweden. The two men rapidly became enemies, though, after Strindberg moved to Berlin in 1892.

While in Germany, he wrote and published works in German, Danish and Norwegian, for example Fatalistische Geschichten (German, 1890) which was published the same year in Danish as Skæbnenoveller. Other German language works during this period included Im Huldrebann (1895), Meervögel (1895), Der Weg zum Leben (1896; also in Swedish, Vägen till lifvet, 1896), and Der Schutzengel (1896).

Later in the 1890s he came to loathe Germany, and a hatred of people grew to fanatical proportions, manifesting itself in antisemitism among other things. For a short period he expressed an adherence to Catholicism. These peculiarities further alienated him from contemporary Sweden. He did however gain some recognition in Germany thanks to his German wife Laura (1854–1928; pseudonym Laura Marholm), who spread Hansson's works to a larger audience.

== Legacy ==
A productive writer, his writings are uneven. However, he is considered today a pioneer within modern Swedish poetry, who reshaped nature poetry; he has sometimes been called the only one among late-19th-century Swedish poets who really absorbed the influence of French Symbolism and "fin-de-siècle" moods. In 1906 Vilhelm Ekelund, a major poet of the next generation, published a paeanic poem hailing him as the like of Pindar, the bard of his province and a poetic forerunner. Ekelund, like Hansson, was a native of the rural southern province of Scania and felt in opposition to the literary fashions of Stockholm; he felt these had rejected Hansson and driven him into exile. From this point on, Ola Hansson began to be reappraised, and in his final years an (unsatisfying) edition of his collected works began to appear in Sweden (greeted by the author's angry pointing out of its shortcomings in newspaper articles dispatched from his exile). He has remained, in particular, an invoked hero of Scanian writers.

In 1913 he was awarded the first scholarship in memory of Gustaf Fröding, elected by Swedish university students.
