= The Three Languages =

German fairy tale

Folk tale
- Name: The Three Languages
- Also known as: Die drei Sprachen
- Aarne–Thompson grouping: ATU 671 (The Three Languages)
- Region: Germany
- Published in: Kinder- und Hausmärchen by The Brothers Grimm
- Related: The Language of the Birds

"The Three Languages" is a German fairy tale collected by the Brothers Grimm, tale number 33. It is Aarne-Thompson type 671.

== Origins ==
The tale was collected by the Brothers Grimm from a man named Hans Truffer from Visp. The tale was included in the 1819 edition of their Kinder- und Hausmärchen, replacing the earlier Der gestiefelte Kater ("The Tomcat with Boots").

== Synopsis ==
A count's only son could learn nothing. Three times the count sent him for a year to famous masters. Each time, the son came back: saying first that he knew what dogs said when they barked; the next time, what birds said; and finally, what frogs said. Infuriated by his uselessness, his father ordered his people to take him to the woods and kill him, but they sympathised with him, and instead brought the count the eyes and tongue of a deer as proof of his death.

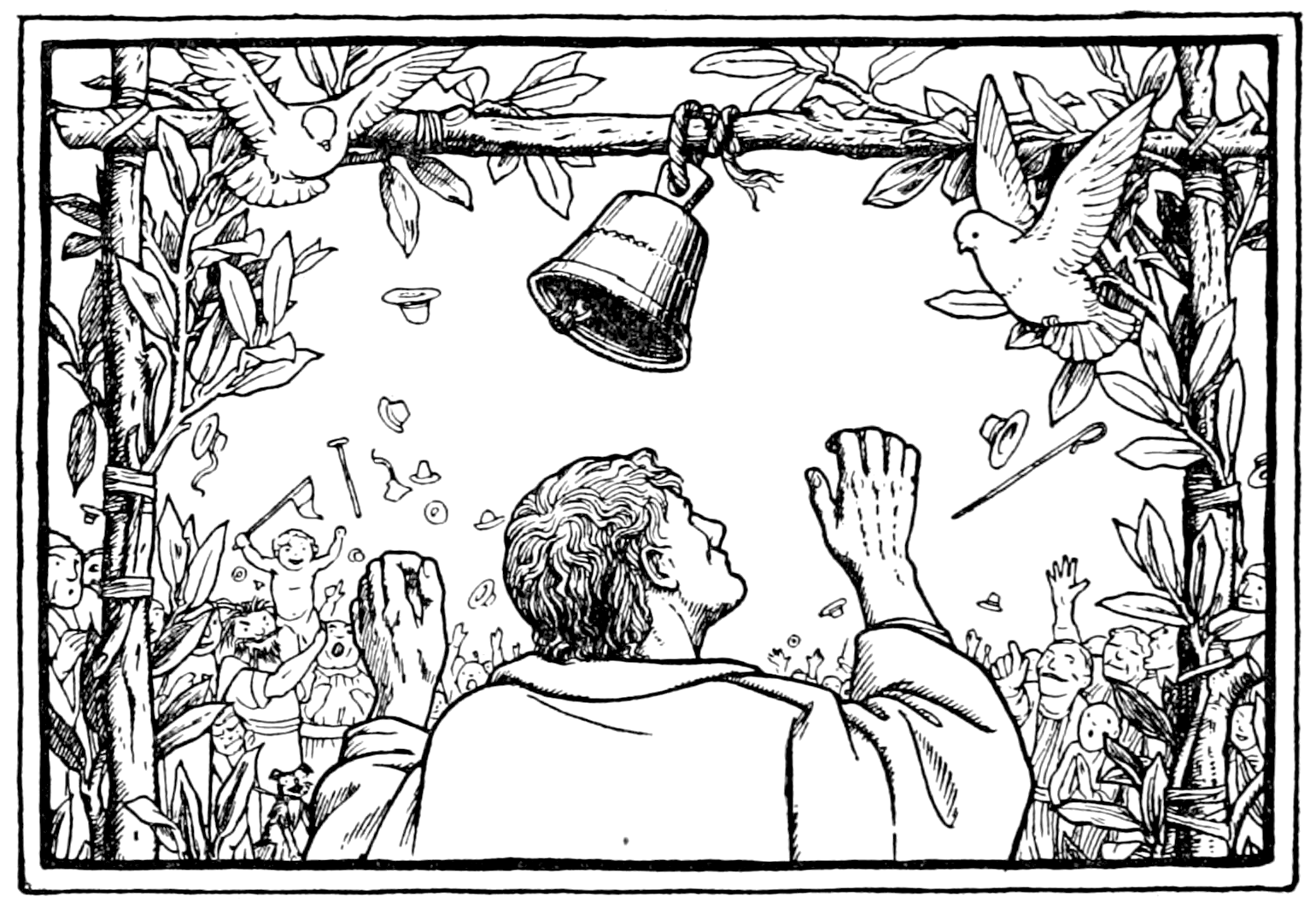
The doves approach the bell - a portent signaling the election of the new Pope. Illustration by John Batten for Joseph Jacobs's Europa's Fairy Book (1916).

On his wanderings, he liberated an area from haunting by dogs, by raising a treasure from under a tower, which he could do because he understood their language. The lord of the castle asked him to do so, and he came out with a chest of gold, and the lord adopted him as a son.

He went to Rome, where the Pope had died; the cardinals wanted him as the Pope's successor, as two doves had sat on his shoulders as a divine sign. On his journey, listening to the frogs had made him sad and thoughtful. He consented to his appointment, as the doves advised him to do. When he had to read Mass, the doves whispered how to do it in his ear.

== Analysis ==
=== Classification ===
The tale is classified in the Aarne–Thompson–Uther Index as ATU 671, "The Three Languages". Stith Thompson argues that the tale is sometimes confused with ATU 517, "The Boy Who Learned Many Things".

Scholarship argues that the learning of the languages of frogs, dogs, and birds symbolically represents the speech of water, land, and air creatures.

The story falls under the folklore motif of "The Outcast Child", i.e., the hero or heroine is expelled from home, but later rises through the ranks of society and returns home victorious.

=== Relation to other stories ===
The ending of the story (commoner boy becoming Pope) harks back to similar legendary tales behind historical papacies, such as Pope Innocent III and Pope Sylvester II, or in fictional tales, such as Gregorius (The Good Sinner). The anointment of the papacy by the sign of a dove also harkens to Pope Fabian of the 3rd century. Sir James Frazer listed some variants of the papacy prophecy connected to tale collection Seven Sages of Rome and variations on the form of acquisition of animal speech.

Joseph Jacobs attempted to reconstruct a protoform of the tale in his Europa's Fairy Book, titled The Language of Animals. In his commentaries, the folklorist argued that the story's original format involved a prophecy that the boy would become pope or king.

Scholars Johannes Bolte and Jiri Polívka suggested tale types ATU 671, ATU 517 ("The Boy Who Learned Many Things"), and ATU 725 ("The Prophecy, or, Dream of Future Sovereignty") comprised an original single tale. In addition, Bolte indicated the Biblical story of Joseph and his dreams as the origin of the Prophetic Dream.

Similar legends exist about the Saints Piran and Ciarán of Saigir (who may have originally been the same figure). According to the legend, both saints were able to communicate with three animals: a badger, a fox, and a bear or wolf.

=== Variants ===
Professor Ralph Steele Boggs listed as a Spanish variant of the ATU 671 the work of Lope de Vega: Novela 6, El Pronóstico Cumplido ("The prophecy fulfilled").

Johann Georg von Hahn collected a variant from Greece, named Von einem, der die Vogelsprache erlernte. ("The story of the boy who learned the language of the birds").

Chinese folklorist and scholar Ting Nai-tung (zh) established a second typological classification of Chinese folktales (the first was by Wolfram Eberhard in the 1930s). According to this new system, in tale type 671, "The Three Languages", the main character is helped by a deity.

In a Mayan folktale, El niño que hablaba con los pájaros (The Little Boy Who Talked with Birds), a little boy listens to the birds' songs and his father insists his son translates it. The son reveals that the birds sing that the father shall salute the son one day, and he expels him from home.

== Cultural references ==
The story is a classic example of the archetypal hero's progress through life. In Lemony Snicket: The Unauthorized Autobiography, there is a rendition of the tale. For the Count's son, learning and education has meaning to the beholder, and in some cases, only to the beholder. In addition, there is an expectation that knowledge is power and can allow the beholder of knowledge to become self-sufficient/self-reliant.

== See also ==
- The Language of the Birds

== Bibliography ==
- Bolte, Johannes; Polívka, Jiri (1913). Anmerkungen zu den Kinder- u. hausmärchen der brüder Grimm. Vol. 1 (NR. 1-60). Leipzig: Dieterich'sche Verlagsbuchhandlung. pp. 322–325.
- Frazer, James G. (April 1888a). "The Language of Animals". The Archaeological Review. 1 (2): 81–91. JSTOR 24708370.
- Frazer, James G. (May 1888b). "The Language of Animals (continued)". Archaeological Review. 1 (3): 161–181. JSTOR 24708429.
- Jacobs, Joseph (1916). European Folk and Fairy Tales. G. P. Putnam's sons.
- Thompson, Stith (1977). The Folktale. University of California Press. ISBN 0-520-03537-2.
