= Language of the birds =

Mythical communication of divine knowledge through birds to humans

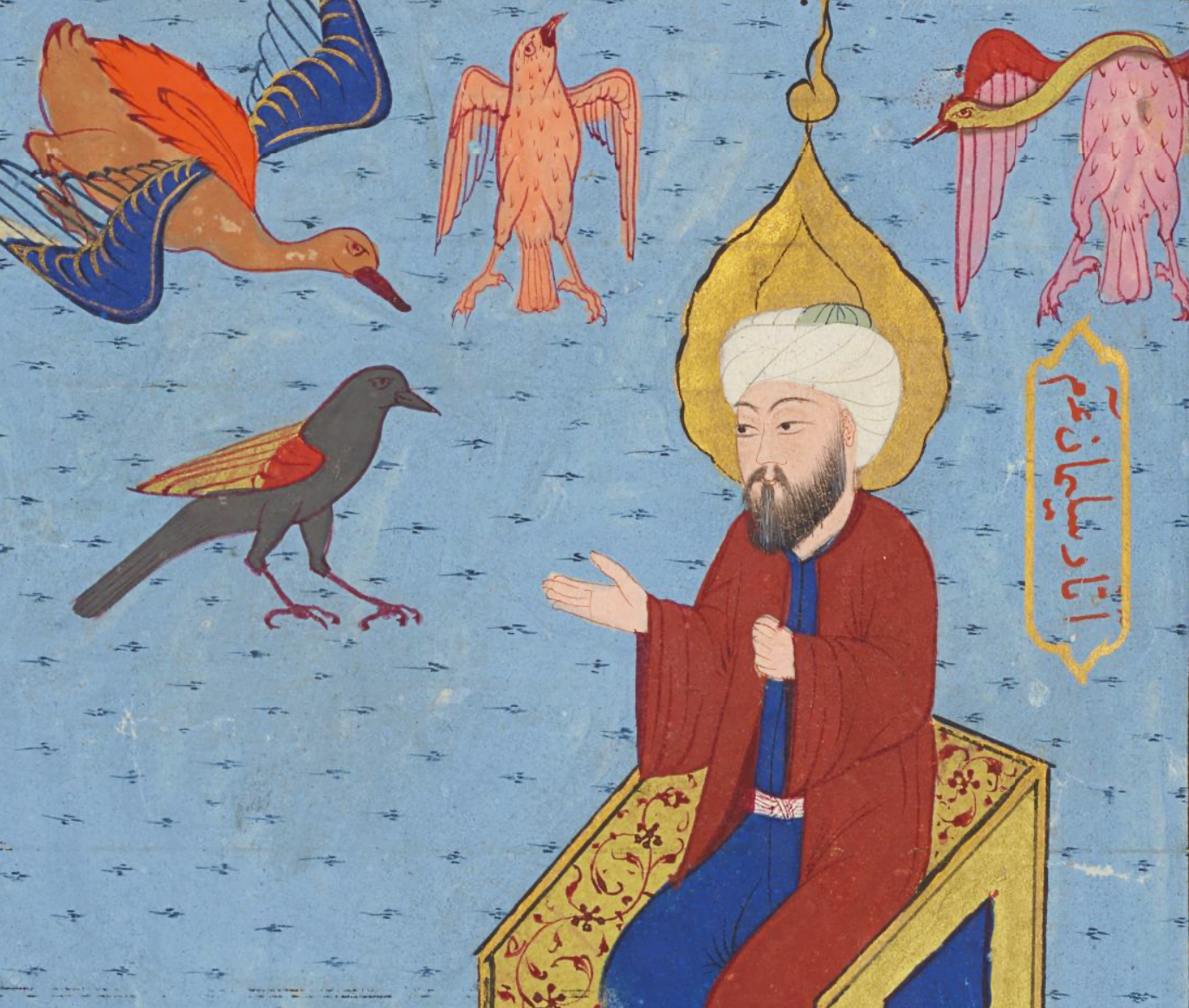
Illustration of a 1585-1590 Ottoman manuscript depicting Sulayman speaking with birds

In Abrahamic and European mythology, medieval literature and occultism, the language of the birds is postulated as a mystical, perfect divine language, Adamic language, Enochian, angelic language or a mythical or magical language used by birds to communicate with the initiated.

== History ==
In Indo-European religion, the behavior of birds has long been used for the purposes of divination by augurs. According to a suggestion by Walter Burkert, these customs may have their roots in the Paleolithic when, during the Ice Age, early humans looked for carrion by observing scavenging birds.

There are also examples of contemporary bird-human communication and symbiosis. In North America, ravens have been known to lead wolves (and native hunters) to prey they otherwise would be unable to consume. In Africa, the greater honeyguide is known to guide humans to beehives in the hope that the hive will be incapacitated and opened for them.

Dating to the Renaissance, birdsong was the inspiration for some magical engineered languages, in particular musical languages. Whistled languages based on spoken natural languages are also sometimes referred to as the language of the birds. Some language games are also referred to as the language of birds, such as in Oromo and Amharic of Ethiopia.

=== Mythology ===
==== Norse mythology ====
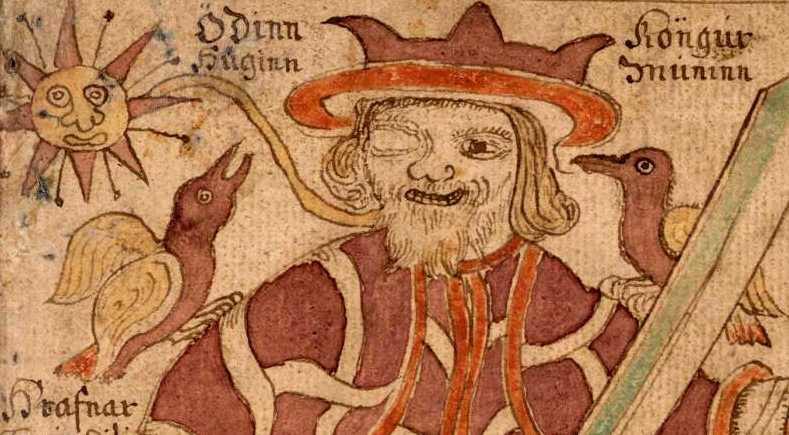
Huginn and Muninn sit on Odin's shoulders in this illustration from an 18th-century Icelandic manuscript.

In Norse mythology, the power to understand the language of the birds was a sign of great wisdom. The god Odin had two ravens, called Hugin and Munin, who flew around the world and told Odin what happened among mortal men.

The legendary king of Sweden Dag the Wise was so wise that he could understand what birds said. He had a tame house sparrow which flew around and brought back news to him. Once, a farmer in Reidgotaland killed Dag's sparrow, which brought on a terrible retribution from the Swedes.

In the Rígsþula, Konr was able to understand the speech of birds. When Konr was riding through the forest hunting and snaring birds, a crow spoke to him and suggested he would win more if he stopped hunting mere birds and rode to battle against foemen.

The ability could also be acquired by tasting dragon blood. According to the Poetic Edda and the Völsunga saga, Sigurd accidentally tasted dragon blood while roasting the heart of Fafnir. This gave him the ability to understand the language of birds, and his life was saved as the birds were discussing Regin's plans to kill Sigurd. Through the same ability Áslaug, Sigurd's daughter, found out the betrothment of her husband Ragnar Lodbrok to another woman.

The 11th century Ramsund carving in Sweden depicts how Sigurd learned the language of birds, in the Poetic Edda and the Völsunga saga

The 11th century Ramsund carving in Sweden depicts how Sigurd learnt the language of birds, in the Poetic Edda and the Völsunga saga.

1. Sigurd is sitting naked in front of the fire preparing the heart of the dragon Fafnir, for his foster-father Regin, (who is Fafnir's brother). Sigurd touches the heart before it has finished cooking, burns his finger and puts it in his mouth to ease the pain. No sooner has he tasted the dragon's blood than he starts to understand the language of birds.
2. The birds say that Regin will not keep his promise of reconciliation and will try to kill Sigurd, whereupon Sigurd preemptively cuts off Regin's head.
3. Regin lies dead beside his own head, with the blacksmith's tools with which he reforged Sigurd's sword Gram scattered about him.
4. Regin's horse stands beside his dead master, laden with the dragon's treasure.
5. Shows Sigurd's slaying of the dragon Fafnir by stabbing him from below, (the prelude to the heart-roasting episode).
6. Shows the dwarf Ótr in otter form at the very beginning of the saga.

In an eddic poem loosely connected with the Sigurd tradition which is named Helgakviða Hjörvarðssonar, the reason why a man named Atli once had the ability is not explained. Atli's lord's son Helgi would marry what was presumably Sigurd's aunt, the valkyrie Sváfa.

==== Greek mythology ====
According to Apollonius Rhodius, the figurehead of Jason's ship, the Argo, was built of oak from the sacred grove at Dodona and could speak the language of birds. Tiresias was also said to have been given the ability to understand the language of the birds by Athena. The language of birds in Greek mythology may be attained by magical means. Democritus, Anaximander, Apollonius of Tyana, Melampus, and Aesopus were all said to have understood the birds.

The "birds" are also mentioned in Homer's Odyssey : "“[...] although I am no prophet really, and I do not know much about the meaning of birds. I tell you he will not long be absent from his dear native land, not if chains of iron hold him fast. He will find a way to get back, for he is never at a loss."

=== Middle Eastern folklore and Abrahamic religions ===
In the Quran, Suleiman (Solomon) and David are said to have been taught the language of the birds. Within Sufism, the language of birds is a mystical divine language. The Conference of the Birds is a mystical poem of 4647 verses by the 12th century Persian poet Attar of Nishapur.

In the Jerusalem Talmud, Solomon's proverbial wisdom was due to his being granted understanding of the language of birds by God.

=== Folklore ===
The concept is also known from many folk tales (including Welsh, Russian, German, Estonian, Greek, Romany), where usually the protagonist is granted the gift of understanding the language of the birds either by some magical transformation or as a boon by the king of birds. The birds then inform or warn the hero about some danger or hidden treasure.

According to the Aarne-Thompson-Uther Index, the understanding of the language of birds can appear in the following tale types:

- Aarne-Thompson-Uther Index tale type ATU 516, "Trusty John": a loyal friend to the king or prince, after he helps him get a princess, hears three ravens or birds commenting that the royal couple shall suffer three grim fates; if anyone helps them avoid the grim fates, they shall not reveal a thing, otherwise they shall become a stone statue.
- Aarne-Thompson-Uther Index tale type ATU 517, "The Boy Who Understood Many Things": a boy listens to the warning of a bird, or a bird predicts that the boy shall return home a king or some other grand destiny. His family expel him from home, ensuring that the predicted fate shall occur.
- Aarne-Thompson-Uther Index tale type ATU 671, "The Three Languages": a boy goes to school and learns the languages of birds, dogs and frogs. With this ability, he rescues a princess, unearths a treasure and/or becomes king. Example: The Language of the Birds, Russian fairy tale.
- Aarne-Thompson-Uther Index tale type ATU 707, "The Three Golden Sons" or "The Dancing Water, the Singing Apple, and the Speaking Bird: the youngest of three sisters promises she will give birth to wonder children if she marries the king. Her envious sisters cast the children in the water soon after birth, but they are saved. Years later, either they set out on their own or someone sends them on a quest, but they journey to find the Speaking Bird (or Bird of Truth), a bird that can speak many languages or knows the truth of their birth.

=== Alchemy ===
In Kabbalah, Renaissance magic, and alchemy, the language of the birds was considered a secret and perfect language and the key to perfect knowledge, sometimes also called the langue verte, or green language.

Elizabethan English occultist John Dee likened the magical Enochian language he received from communications with angels to the traditional notion of a language of birds.

=== Literature and culture ===
Compare also the rather comical and satirical Birds of Aristophanes, Chaucer’s Parliament of Fowls, and William Baldwin’s Beware the Cat.

In medieval France, the language of the birds (la langue des oiseaux) was a secret language of the Troubadours, connected with the Tarot, allegedly based on puns and symbolism drawn from homophony, e. g. an inn called au lion d'or ("the Golden Lion") is allegedly "code" for au lit on dort "in the bed one sleeps".

René Guénon has written an article about the symbolism of the language of the birds.

== See also ==
- Bird vocalization – Sounds birds use to communicate
- Musical language – Constructed language based on musical sounds
