= The Language of the Birds (Sibelius) =

Incidental music by Jean Sibelius (1911)

- Theatre score by Jean Sibelius
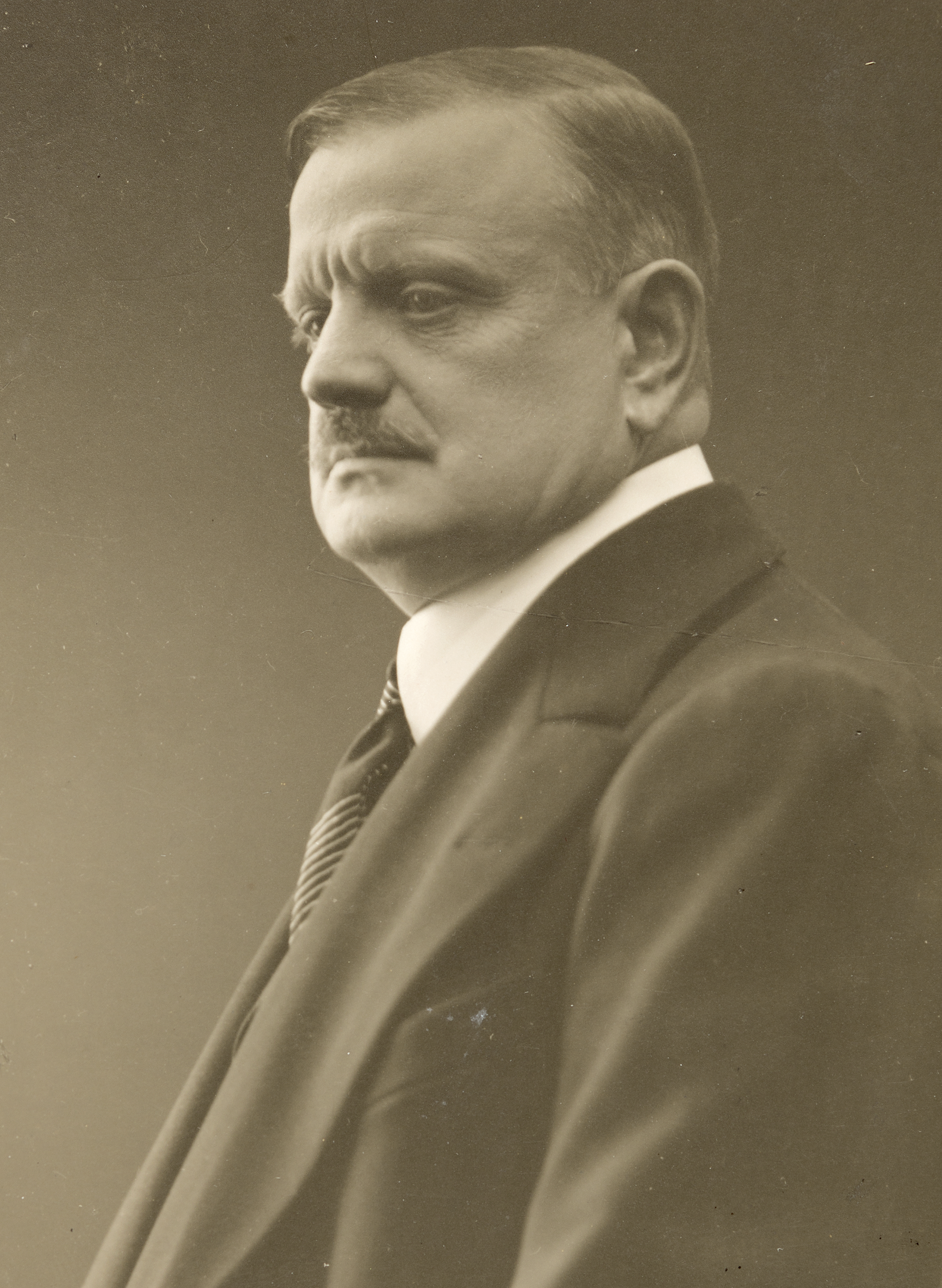
- The composer (c. 1911)
- Native name: Die Sprache der Vögel
- Catalogue: JS 62
- Text: Die Sprache der Vögel; by Adolf Paul
- Composed: 1911
- Publisher: Fazer Music (1997)
- Duration: 4 mins.

Premiere
- Date: 21 September 1983
- Location: Helsinki, Finland (yle)
- Conductor: Esa-Pekka Salonen
- Performers: Finnish Radio Symphony Orchestra

The Language of the Birds (in German: Die Sprache der Vögel), JS 62, is a theatre score for orchestra written in 1911 by the Finnish composer Jean Sibelius. The music comprises just a single number: the "Wedding March" (in Finnish: "Häämarssi") to accompany a festive scene in Act III. However, no production of Paul's play appears to have utilized Sibelius's music, and as such, The Language of the Birds had to wait until 21 September 1983 for its world premiere, when the Finnish conductor Esa-Pekka Salonen and the Finnish Radio Symphony Orchestra played it over Yle radio.

== History ==
"I have no idea how much I'll have to compose, but I'm keen to be of assistance to Paul", he wrote to his publisher, Breitkopf & Härtel.

On 4 August, Sibelius completed the score for The Language of the Birds, which turned out to be merely one number: the Wedding March.

"[The Language of the Birds] may not be stupefying," Sibelius wrote in his diary. "But it is interesting in the manner of modern commissioned stuff. It is natural and zweckmässig [effective] in its scoring—and not without poetry".

== Instrumentation ==
The Language of the Birds' is scored for the following instruments, organized by family (woodwinds, brass, percussion, and strings):

- 2 flutes, 1 oboe, 2 clarinets, and 1 bass clarinet
- 2 trumpets and 2 trombones
- Timpani, bass drum, snare drum, cymbals, tambourine, and triangle
- Violins (I and II), violas, cellos, and double basses

The piece is notable by Sibelius's standards in that it omits both horns and bassoons. Although the piece is titled as a march, this is "something of a misnomer, as it is not particularly march-like in character".

== Discography ==
The Estonian-American conductor Neemi Järvi and the Gothenburg Symphony Orchestra made the world premiere studio recording of The Language of the Birds in 1990 for BIS. The table below lists this and other commercially available recordings:

No.	Conductor	Orchestra	Rec. (Note: Refers to the year in which the performers recorded the work; this may not be the same as the year in which the recording was first released to the general public.)	Time	Recording venue	Label	Ref.
1	Neeme Järvi	Gothenburg Symphony Orchestra	1990	3:27	Gothenburg Concert Hall	BIS	(Note: N. Järvi–BIS (CD–502) 1991)
2	Atso Almila	Kuopio Symphony Orchestra	1998	3:56	Kuopio Music Centre	Finlandia	(Note: A. Almila–Finlandia (3984–23391–2) 1999)
3	Leif Segerstam	Turku Philharmonic Orchestra	2014	4:55	Turku Concert Hall	Naxos	(Note: L. Segerstam–Naxos (8.573300) 2015)

== Notes, references, and sources ==
Notes

Sources

- Barnett, Andrew (1991). Scaramouche, Op. 71; Wedding March ('The Language of the Birds') (booklet). Neemi Järvi and Gothenburg Symphony Orchestra. BIS. pp. 3–7. BIS CD-502.
- Barnett, Andrew (2007). Sibelius. New Haven: Yale University Press. ISBN 978-0-300-11159-0.
- Dahlström, Fabian [in Swedish] (2003). Jean Sibelius: Thematisch-bibliographisches Verzeichnis seiner Werke [Jean Sibelius: A Thematic Bibliographic Index of His Works] (in German). Wiesbaden: Breitkopf & Härtel. ISBN 3-7651-0333-0.
- Kurki, Eija (2019). "The Language of the Birds: Theatre music that cost a lot of effort but was never performed". SibeliusOne.com. Sibelius One.
- Tawaststjerna, Erik (2008) [1965/1967; trans. 1976]. Sibelius: Volume I, 1865–1905. Translated by Layton, Robert. London: Faber and Faber. ISBN 978-0-571-24772-1.
- Wells, Dominic (2015). Sibelius: Belshazzar's Feast / Overture in E / Scène de ballet / Wedding March / Cortège / Menuetto / Processional (booklet). Leif Segerstam & Turku Philharmonic Orchestra. Naxos. 8.573300.
