= Adolf Paul =

Swedish writer (1863–1943)

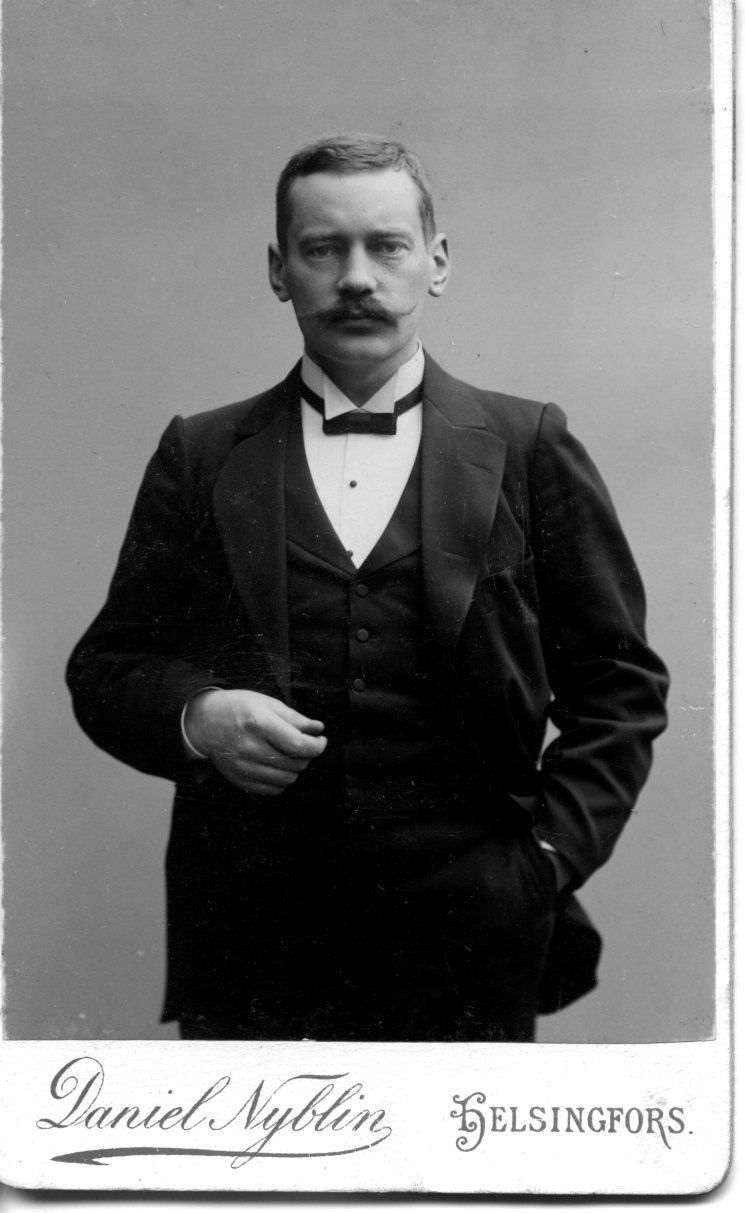
Adolf Paul cabinet card, by Daniel Nyblin, Helsinki, Finland.

Adolf Georg Wiedersheim-Paul (6 January 1863 – 30 September 1943) was a Swedish novelist and playwright. He lived most of his adult life in Berlin, Germany, where he was a friend of Swedish writer August Strindberg, Finnish composer Jean Sibelius, Norwegian painter Edvard Munch and Finnish artist Akseli Gallen-Kallela.

== Biography ==
Paul was born on 6 January 1863 on Bromö, an island in lake Vänern in Sweden. At that time his last name was Wiedesheim-Paul. The family name hailed from a Prussian Major named Ludwig von Wiedesheim, born in Anhalt-Kothen, Germany and an Italian earl named Fernando Pollini (Pollini became Paul in German). When Paul was nine years old, the family moved to Jokioinen in Finland and added an "r" to Wiedersheim. Paul, his older sister, a younger sister and seven younger brothers grew up on a large estate his father managed.

Paul's father wanted him to become a farmer, and he first studied agriculture at Mustiala Agriculture Center in Tammela. After three years of studies, Paul's father let Paul manage a farm the father owned on the Ruissalo island outside Turku. Soon growing bored with farming, Paul decided to become an artist. In 1886, he began studying music in Helsinki. During this period he became a socialist and shed Wiedersheim from his surname. Studying at the Music Academy in Helsinki, he became a friend of Finnish composer Jean Sibelius. Both studied with the famous Italian composer and pianist Ferruccio Busoni, who brought them to Germany when he moved there from Helsinki in 1889.

When Paul first arrived in Berlin the city was a cultural center that drew artists from all over Europe. Since it was further north than Paris, the other artist Mecca at this time, many Scandinavian artists were drawn to Berlin. Paul joined the Scandinavian artist community where in addition to Sibelius he counted Norwegian painter Edvard Munch, Swedish writer August Strindberg and artist Albert Engström among his friends.

Paul is depicted in one of Edvard Munch's paintings, The Vampire. The painting shows a red-haired woman bending her head over the neck of a man hiding his face in her lap.

== Early novels banned ==
Collaborating with Sibelius, Paul discovered he was better at composing plays and novels than music and after a concert in Helsinki in 1891 focused on his writing. That year he published his first novel, En bok om en menniska (A book about a man), which was published by Bonniers in Stockholm. In 1892 he published a collection of short stories called The Ripper, a title inspired by London serial killer Jack the Ripper. Albert Bonnier considered this book too indecent and refused to publish it and other books Paul later wrote about violence and sexuality. Instead, The Ripper was published by Grönlund in Turku, Finland, but the book was controversial and critics considered some of its content obscene. In 1893, Paul published Herr Ludvigs, which is believed to be based on his father's misfortunes as a businessman. Wiedersheim-Paul had died in 1892 after losing most of his assets. The book contains interesting descriptions of Helsinki.

Many of Paul's early novels challenged contemporary morals. His En bok om en menniska was autobiographical and describes a man who is struggling to define and promote his identity. The main character passionately opposes the norms of the society, disdains the bourgeoisie and has a sense of spiritual superiority. Breaking with the norms and becoming an artist, he then faces an identity crisis and suffers a mental breakdown. This book was the first in a series of three and dedicated to Sibelius, who also appears in the book thinly disguised as Sillen.

The second novel in the En bok om en människa series titled Med det falska och det ärliga ögat (With the false and the honest eye) was published in 1895 and dedicated to Paul's piano teacher Ferruccio Busoni. This book was mainly about free love and the conflict between the carnal and the intellectual, and contained characters based on Paul's artist friends in Berlin. One of its inspirations was Edvard Munch and his art.

Several of Paul's novels were considered obscene because of their violent and abnormal sexual content. In The Ripper, one of the stories was an imaginary diary of Jack the Ripper with graphic details. Another short story, Oidipus i Norden, was inspired by an 1889 murder in south Sweden, Yngsjömordet, where a mother and her son had an incestuous relationship and bludgeoned the son's wife to death. The Ripper was not the only novel banned as obscene. After the release of Die Madonna mit dem Rosenbush, (The Madonna with the rose bush) in 1904, the publisher was sued. The novel's main character is an artist who delivers a different work than the portrait he was commissioned to paint, enraging his client. The novel, which is set in 16th-century Lübeck, describes conflicts between Catholics and Lutherans and contains some debauchery. It was translated into Swedish.

Paul's artist friend Axel Gallén-Kallela created the cover for one of his novels, Ein gefallener profet (A fallen prophet) in 1895. This novel was well received and so were Paul's early plays. At the Helsinki opening of the historic play Kung Kristian II in 1898, Paul received standing ovations and was crowned with a laurel wreath that he kept for the rest of his life. The royalties for his books and plays made sure his family had some steady income during the 25 years these lasted.

== A Strindberg letter ==
In Sweden, Paul was overshadowed by August Strindberg, his older friend whom he greatly admired and whose work influenced Paul's early novels. When Strindberg relocated to Berlin in 1892 after his divorce from Siri von Essen, Paul was the one who introduced him to everyone worth knowing and to the hangout Zum schwarzen Ferkel, where the artist community gathered. For a while the two writers boarded together. In 1893 Strindberg had just married Frida Uhl, an Austrian journalist. The couple spent their honeymoon in England, where the heat made Strindberg uncomfortable. They left England for Germany, planning to visit Paul. Penniless Strindberg wrote a letter to Paul on June 20:

Höfers Hotel, Hamburg

20 Juni 93.

Adolf Paul, Br.

Sedan i går morgse sitter jag fången i Höfers Hotel, Hamburg. Orsaken: Skinnerier på vägen, så att det fattades 2 mark att komma till Rügen. Nu växer hotellräkningen, och koleran står och väntar; så här blir nog ingen Weimarresa av. Jag har ställt pengar på Rügen, men om det kommer några vet fan! Har Ni några, så telegrafera över dem att jag får rymma åtminstone. 20 Mark går det med. Jag hade en 7-helvetes otur. Ty Pontoppidan var bortrest; och Drachman som jag sökte, var också rest. (Min resa dit tog de sista 7 marken!) Nu har jag inga telegrafpengar, ingenting, och nerverna, som jag ser på min skrivstil, äro åtgångna. Jag borde egentligen skjuta mig, men det skulle ha varit gjort för länge sedan.

Vänl.
August Strindberg.

The letter complains about money, cholera and bad nerves. The last sentence reads: “I should shoot myself, but that should have been done a long time ago.”

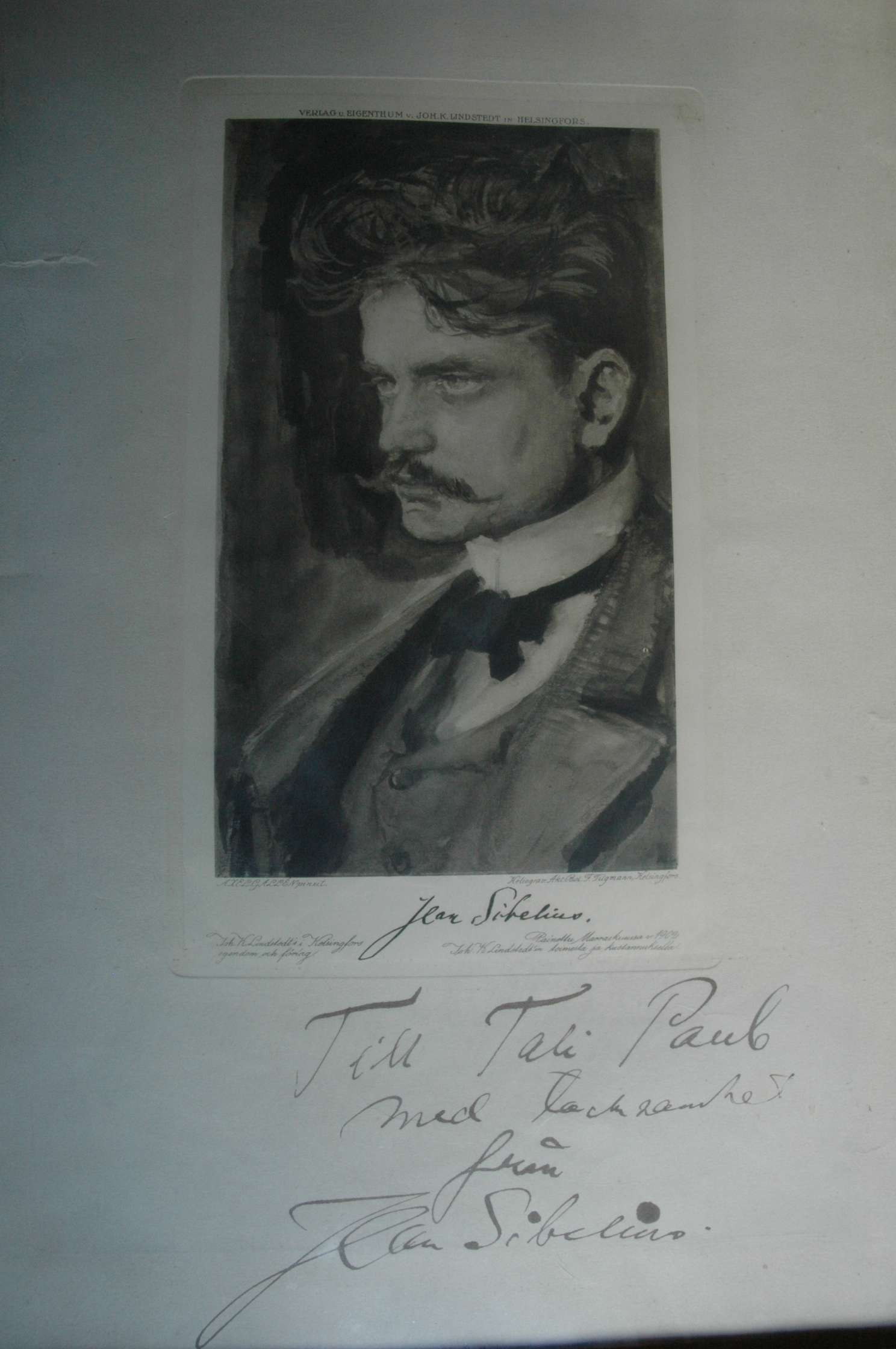
Axel Gallen-Kallela's Sibelius portrait with Sibelius' dedication to Natalie Paul (wife of Adolf Paul).

In 1894, Paul contributed to a book honoring Strindberg in which he especially highlighted Strindberg's view of the battle between the genders, and revealed a familiarity with Nietzsche's übermench ideal. In the mid-1890s Strindberg, who was now middle-aged, had separated from Frida Uhl, with whom he had a daughter. He suffered from severe paranoia and, according to some sources, wrongly accused Paul of having based unsympathetic characters on him in two of his books. Other sources say, however, that both Strindberg and Paul populated their novels with miserable characters based on each other. Most of the artists in Paul's group based fictional characters on each other and used each other in paintings.

As opposed to his on and off relationship with Strindberg, Paul remained a lifelong friend of Sibelius and cooperated with him on several occasions. In 1898 Sibelius composed music to Paul's play Kung Kristian II (King Kristian II) and in 1911 for the wedding march in Die Sprache der Vögel. Paul also wrote lyrics for Sibelius’ Korsspindeln. Both Kung Kristian II and another play, Karin Månsdotter, were performed at the Stockholm Royal Opera in 1898.

In the late 1890s, Paul's bohemian circle of artist friends dissolved and Paul settled down and started a family. After moving to Berlin, Paul had adapted to German circumstances and was writing in German, reaching a larger audience than possible when writing in Swedish. Having mostly grown up and come of age in Finland, he was not well connected in Stockholm, which may have hampered his career potential. His works were published by large publishing houses in Sweden, Finland and Germany, including Bonniers, Wahlström & Wistrand, Åhlen & Åkerlund, Grönlunds, Lűbke & Hartmann, Breitkopf & Härtel and Schuster & Löffler.

Paul continued to work on plays and novels and his career waxed and waned over the years. One of his best known novels was his 1915 bestseller titled Die Tänzerin Barberina (Barberina, the dancer) whose main character was based on the dramatic life of Italian dancer Barbara Campanini (1721–1799), who was brought to Berlin by Frederick the Great of Prussia to become a highly paid dancer at the newly opened Berlin Opera and his lover. Literature critics considered Paul's psychological portrayals of Voltaire in Ormen i paradiset and Napoleon in S:t Helena among his literary highlights.

Between 1914 and 1919 Paul worked as a screenwriter and wrote scripts for some 14 films, including Die Teufelskirche. In 1919 he wrote a movie script for Die Tänzerin Barberina starring Strindberg's third wife Harriet Bosse.

Paul's 75th birthday in 1937 was celebrated with the publication of Das Lebenswerk Adolf Pauls, which covered his published and unpublished production over the years. In addition to plays and film scripts he authored some 20 novels. In 1937 the King of Sweden, Gustaf V, honored him with the Order of Vasa.

== Marriage ==
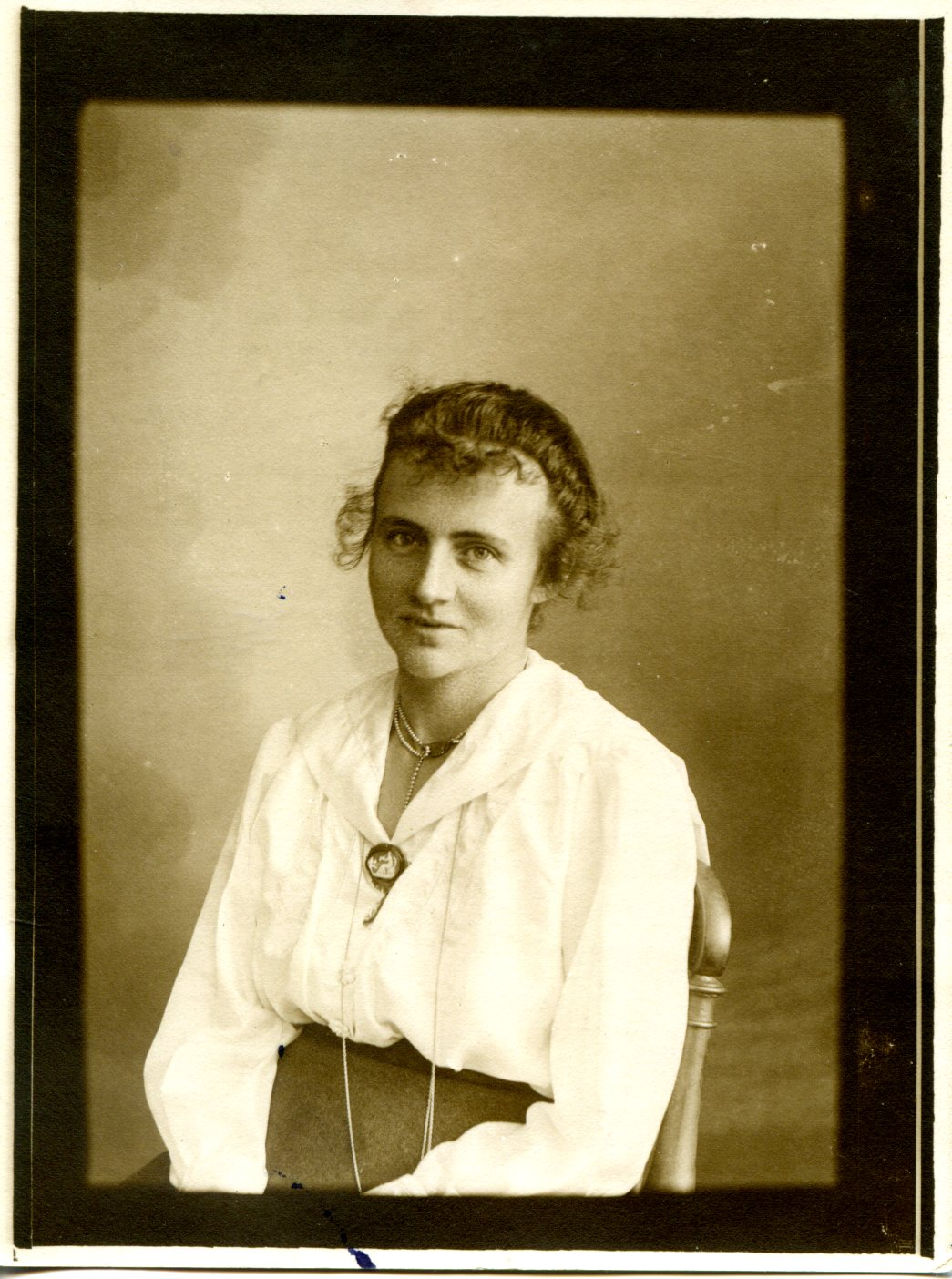
Natalie Brehmer in the late 1890s.

He never returned to settle in Scandinavia but did not give up his Swedish citizenship. Paul married Natalie Brehmer on 18 August 1897, when she was 18 and he was 34. She came from a family of senators, lawyers and mayors. Her father was a wealthy merchant in Lübeck. Intelligent, artistic and beautiful, Natalie Paul was her husband's muse and many of Paul's artist friends dedicated works to her. "There was just something very special about her", one of her granddaughters recalls. Adolf and Natalie Paul had five children, twin daughters and three sons; the oldest son died after a childhood accident.

The couple's children became Swedish citizens to avoid being drafted into Kaiser Wilhelm II's army. In 1931, when Germany faced mass unemployment, being Swedish citizens enabled two of the younger children to move to Sweden and find employment. And after Paul died on 30 September 1943, his widow and two remaining children, a son with his family and a daughter, were evacuated to Sweden where they remained for the rest of their lives.

== See also ==
- Incidental music by Jean Sibelius (1898) for Paul's play King Christian II
- Incidental music by Jean Sibelius (1911) for Paul's play The Language of the Birds
