= Prayer circle =

Spiritual ritual

A prayer circle is most simply where participants join hands in a literal circle of prayer, often as part of a vigil. Informal prayer circles have been practiced for centuries. Their recent resurgence in popularity is frequently attributed to their use in the Catholic Charismatic Renewal movement. Similarly, amongst North American and specifically Native American Catholics, prayer circles have formed around Kateri Tekakwitha, who was the first Native American to be beatified by the Roman Catholic Church. Tekakwitha Conference prayer circles, called Kateri Prayer Circles, have been formed on nearly all U.S. Indian Reservations. In Islam, Muslims who make the pilgrimage to Mecca will form concentric circles around the Kaaba in prayer, and these too are commonly referred to as prayer circles.

A prayer circle may also refer to some online communities where people share their thoughts and prayers with other like-minded worshippers, usually within specially designated message board areas.

== Origin ==
Ritual prayer in a circle around an altar is not unique to Christianity. Ritual ceremonies around an altar are common in paganism, and ritual prayer dances around an altar were practiced by early Christians, especially Gnostics, before the practice was condemned as a heresy by the Second Council of Nicaea in 787 A.D. (See Nibley, "The Early Christian Prayer Circle", page 41.) Much later, Protestants began conducting informal prayer circles. Sometimes these communities are developed online.

== Online ==
With the World Wide Web's rapid growth among all sectors of society, many Christians and other faith-based peoples have found a niche on the Internet, where they can share their prayers, thoughts and wishes with each other. It is not known who was the first to set up an online prayer circle, but today there are dozens, if not hundreds, of Web sites set up for these purposes, from large-scale sites run by The American Bible Society and Beliefnet to smaller message boards run by community churches.

An online prayer circle is often a vigil set up by a participant in honor of someone close to that participant. Larger online prayer circles are also formed in honor and remembrance of the victims of notable disasters or tragedies. Though religious in tone, online prayer circles are generally non-denominational and at times are not even explicitly Christian.

== Mormonism ==
In Mormonism, a prayer circle is a mode of prayer practiced by Mormons who have taken part in the endowment ceremony. Established by Joseph Smith in 1842 or 1843, he called it the "true order of prayer". The ritual involves one person offering a prayer while surrounded by a circle of participants. The members of the circle repeat the words of the prayer. Earlier Mormons had practiced conventional Protestant-type prayer circles at least as early as 1833.

In the Church of Jesus Christ of Latter-day Saints, the largest branch of the Latter Day Saint movement, prayer circles since 1978 are no longer practiced outside of temples, and members of the church do not take part in prayer circles except as part of an endowment ceremony.

== See also ==
- Isiguqo
