= Láadan =

Constructed language

- Created by: Suzette Haden Elgin and collaborators
- Date: 1982
- Setting and usage: experiment in feminist linguistics, and featured in Elgin's novel series beginning with Native Tongue
- Purpose: Constructed language: artistic and philosophical language; fictional language; Láadan
- Sources: a priori language, with influences from Navajo and English

Language codes
- ISO 639-3: ldn
- Glottolog: laad1235

Láadan (Láadan pronunciation: [ˈlɑ˦ɑˈdɑn]) is a gynocentric constructed language created by Suzette Haden Elgin in 1982 to test the Sapir–Whorf hypothesis, specifically to determine if development of a language aimed at expressing the views of women would shape a culture; a subsidiary hypothesis was that Western natural languages may be better suited for expressing the views of men than women. The language was included in her science fiction Native Tongue series.

Láadan contains a number of words that are used to make unambiguous statements that include how one feels about what one is saying. According to Elgin, this is designed to counter male-centered language's limitations on women, who are forced to respond "I know I said that, but I meant this".

== Motivation, development and publication history ==
Elgin was a writer of both fiction and nonfiction book series. Láadan and the ideas underpinning its creation were described in several series:

It was included as a language portrayed diegetically within the speculative fiction novel trilogy Native Tongue (1984), The Judas Rose (1987), and Earthsong (1993). The role of the language in the plot of the overall story is as a transformative project, whose development changes the social roles of an extended family of linguist characters.

After the publication of the second novel, A First Dictionary & Grammar of Láadan (1988) was published in the hopes that a community of speakers could form, and the validity of the project from the novels might be tested in real life. The grammar book was advertised in literary and feminist magazines, and feedback led to a second edition and posthumously a third edition.

Before conceiving of Láadan, Elgin had published a self-help book, The Gentle Art of Verbal Self Defense (1980), which was developed into a series of books focusing on the workplace, romantic relationships, and so on. It postulated that at least in English, phrasing often allowed for an ambiguous hostility which could be used as a sort of verbal abuse especially in competitive environments, and discussed which defenses might be effective and which not; see verbal self-defense § Influential contributors. To allow for the means to express nuanced emotion and other distinctions, features combine to create and modify meanings.

== Phonology ==
=== Tones ===
Láadan is a tonal language. Elgin studied Navajo, which has tones, for her doctoral dissertation, and it was influential on the tones of Láadan. Láadan utilises two distinct tones: (Note: Some people analyze these tone sequences as tonemic as well, for a total of four tones. By this analysis, the word "Láadan" would thus be considered to have two syllables, /lâː/ and /dan/. Elgin preferred an analysis of the language as having no long vowels and a single tone, the high tone (distinguished from "neutral, baseline pitch"), but she acknowledged that linguists using other formalisms would be justified in saying that there are two tones, high and low (or unmarked or mid).)

- lo – /lō/ or /lò/, a short, medium or low tone, represented by a single unmarked vowel
- ló – /ló/, a short, high tone, represented by a single marked vowel

The word "Láadan" has three syllables: "lá-" with the short vowel /a/ plus high tone; "-a" with the short vowel /a/ and low tone; and "-dan" with a low tone.

Láadan does not allow any double (i.e. long) phonemes. Whenever two identical short vowels would occur side by side in a single morpheme, one of them has to be marked for high tone. When adding an affix would result in two identical vowels side by side, an epenthetic /h/ is inserted to prevent the forbidden sequence. The language will allow either máa or maá, but not *maa. These combinations can be described as:

- loó – /lǒː/, a long, low-rising tone, represented by a double vowel, the second of which is marked
- lóo – /lôː/, a long, high-falling tone, represented by a double vowel, the first of which is marked

=== Vowels ===
Láadan has five vowels:

- a – /ɑ/, an open back unrounded vowel (as English calm),
- e – /ɛ/, an open-mid front unrounded vowel (as English bell),
- i – /ɪ/, a near-close near-front unrounded vowel (as English bit),
- o – /o/, a close-mid back rounded vowel (as English home),
- u – /u/, a close back rounded vowel (as English boon).

=== Consonants ===
		Labial	Dental / Alveolar		Postalveolar / Palatal	Glottal
		Labial	median	lateral	Postalveolar / Palatal	Glottal
Nasal		m /m/	n /n/			
Plosive		b /b/	d /d/			
Fricative	voiceless		th /θ/	lh /ɬ/	sh /ʃ/	h /h/
Fricative	voiced				zh /ʒ/	
Approximant		w /w/	r /ɹ/	l /l/	y /j/	

Láadan lacks the consonants /p, t, k, ɡ, s, z, f, v/. It uses b, d, sh (/ʃ/), m, n, l, r, w, y (/j/), h with the same phonetic value as English. Three digraphs require further explanation:

- th – /θ/, a voiceless dental fricative (always as in English think, never as then),
- zh – /ʒ/, a voiced postalveolar fricative (as English pleasure),
- lh – /ɬ/, a voiceless alveolar lateral fricative (as Welsh llan).

== Grammar ==
=== Mandatory parts of speech ===
Most Láadan sentences, and all formal sentences in the language, contain three particles:

- The speech-act particle – this occurs at the beginning of the sentence and marks it as either a statement (bíi), a question (báa), et cetera; in connected speech or writing, this particle is often omitted. They are:
- Bíi: Indicates a sentence conveying declarative knowledge or in the indicative mood (usually optional)
- Báa: Indicates a question
- Bó: Indicates a command; very rare, except to small children
- Bóo: Indicates a request; this is the usual imperative/"command" form
- Bé: Indicates a promise
- Bée: Indicates a warning
- The grammatical tense particle – this occurs second in the sentence and marks it as either present tense (ril), past tense (eril), future tense (aril) or hypothetical (wil); without the tense particle, the sentence is assumed to have the same tense as the previous sentence.
- The evidence particle – this occurs at the end of statements and indicates the trustworthiness of the statement. (Note: Lojban was developed around the same time as Láadan and was influenced to use evidentials.) They are:
- wa: Known to speaker because perceived by speaker, externally or internally
- wi: Known to speaker because self-evident
- we: Perceived by speaker in a dream
- wáa: Assumed true by speaker because speaker trusts source
- waá: Assumed false by speaker because speaker distrusts source; if evil intent by the source is also assumed, the form is waálh
- wo: Imagined or invented by speaker, hypothetical
- wóo: Used to indicate that the speaker states a total lack of knowledge as to the validity of the matter

=== Word order ===
Láadan has two syntactic orderings. In active voice, it is a verb–subject–object (VSO) language; the English example sentence in the following table would read in Láadan: Bíi eril yod Sham doyuth wa. In passive voice, it is an object–verb–subject (OVS) language; the sentence would read in Láadan: Bíi eril doyuth yod Shameshub wa. In either case, it uses a minority word order type among languages of the world.

Order	Example	Usage	Languages
SOV	"Sam apples ate."	45%	Ainu, Akkadian, Amharic, Ancient Greek, Armenian, Aymara, Bambara, Basque, Bengali, Burmese, Burushaski, Chukchi, Cushitic languages, Dravidian languages, Elamite, Hindustani, Hittite, Hopi, Itelmen, Japanese, Korean, Kurdish, Kurukh, Latin, Lhasa Tibetan, Manchu, Mongolian, Munda languages, Nahuatl, Navajo, Nepali, Nivkh, Northeast Caucasian languages, Northwest Caucasian languages, Pali, Pashto, Persian, Quechua, Sanskrit, Sinhala, Siouan-Catawban languages, Tamil, Tigrinya, Turkic languages, Yukaghir
SVO	"Sam ate apples."	42%	Arabic (modern spoken varieties), Chinese (Mandarin, Cantonese, etc.), English, Estonian, Finnish, Hausa, Hebrew, Indonesian, Kashmiri, Malay, most European languages, Pa'O, Swahili, Thai, Vietnamese, Yucatec Maya
VSO	"Ate Sam apples."	9%	Arabic (classical and modern standard), Berber languages, Biblical Hebrew, Celtic languages, Filipino, Geʽez, Kariri, Mayan languages, Polynesian languages
VOS	"Ate apples Sam."	3%	Algonquian languages, Arawakan languages, Car, Chumash, Fijian, K'iche, Malagasy, Otomanguean languages, Qʼeqchiʼ, Salishan languages, Terêna
OVS	"Apples ate Sam."	1%	Äiwoo, Hixkaryana, Urarina
OSV	"Apples Sam ate."	0%	Haida, Tobati, Warao
Frequency distribution of word order in languages surveyed by Russell S. Tomlin in the 1980s

Verbs and adjectives are interchangeable. There are no articles, and the object is marked by the -th or -eth suffix. The plural number is shown only by the me- prefix to the verb. The particle ra following a verb makes it negative. Separate clauses are joined by the particle hé.

Some basic sentences in Láadan

bíi ril áya mahina wa
statement PRS be_beautiful flower observed-truth
The flower is beautiful

báa eril mesháad with
Q PAST PL-go/come woman
Did the women go/come?

bíi ril lámála with ruleth wa
statement PRS stroke/caress woman cat-OBJ observed-truth
The woman strokes the cat

bóo wil di le neth
REQ HYP speak/say I you-OBJ
I would like to speak with you, please.

bíi aril meleyan ra lanemid wáa
statement FUT PL-be_brown NEG dog received-truth
I hear the dogs will not be brown

bíi ril an le hé eril bethudeha ne wa
statement PRS know I embedded-clause-marker PAST cave-at you observed-truth
I know that you were at the cave

=== Morphology ===
Láadan has an agglutinative morphology and uses a number of affixes to indicate various feelings and moods that many natural languages can only indicate by tone of voice, body language, or circumlocution.

Affix	meaning	example
(-)lh(-)	disgust or dislike	hahodimi: "pleasantly bewildered"; hahodimilh: "unpleasantly bewildered"
du-	to try to	bíi eril dusháad le wa: "I tried to come"
dúu-	to try in vain to	bíi eril dúusháad le wa: "I tried in vain to come"
ná-	progressive aspect	bíi eril dúunásháad le wa: "I was trying in vain to come"
-(e)tha	natural possessor	lalal betha: "her mother's milk"
-(e)tho	customary or legal possessor	ebahid letho: "my husband"
-(e)thi	possessor by chance	losh nethi: "your money (gambling winnings)"
-(e)the	possessor by unknown provenance	ana worulethe: "the cats' food"
-(h)id	denotes male (otherwise female or gender neutral)	thul: "mother/parent"; thulid: "father"

The speech-act particle, at the beginning of a sentence, can also carry several suffixes, which expand on the overall state of the sentence. For example, bíi begins a statement, but bíide begins a statement that is part of a narrative; bóoth begins a request made in pain; báada begins a question that is meant in jest.

=== Pronouns ===
Pronouns in Láadan are built up from a number of constituent parts. The consonant l marks the first person, n the second person, and b the third person. Usually, these are followed by the vowel e. The vowel a is used to designate someone who is loved, while lhe- is prefixed to describe someone who is despised. The suffix -zh is used to mark a plural pronoun for numbers up to four, and -n for numbers beyond that. Therefore, lazh means "we, several beloved", and lheben means "they, many despised".

== Reception ==
Anthony Burgess mentioned Láadan in a 1985 review in The Observer of A Feminist Dictionary which itself had an entry for the language, calling it "ingenious" and stating he was "highly sympathetic" of its aims, but asserting that "it's not going to work" because "[n]ot enough women care sufficiently". Burgess had experience with fictional languages from developing the Nadsat argot for his 1962 novel A Clockwork Orange. In March 1987, Haden Elgin said in women's music magazine Hot Wire that generally men had considered the language impractical but women were more positive about it.

== See also ==
- Language and gender
- Muted group theory
