= Co-cultural communication theory =

Social science theory

Co-cultural communication theory was built upon the frameworks of muted group theory and standpoint theory. The cornerstone of co-cultural communication theory is muted group theory as proposed in the mid-1970s by Shirley and Edwin Ardener. The Ardeners were cultural anthropologists who made the observation that most other cultural anthropologists practicing ethnography in the field were talking only to the leaders of the cultures, who were by and large adult males. The researchers would then use this data to represent the culture as a whole, leaving out the perspectives of women, children and other groups made voiceless by the cultural hierarchy (S. Ardener, 1975). The Ardeners maintained that groups which function at the top of the society hierarchy determine to a great extent the dominant communication system of the entire society (E. Ardener, 1978). Ardener's 1975 muted group theory also posited that dominant group members formulate a "communication system that support their perception of the world and conceptualized it as the appropriate language for the rest of society".

Communication faculty Stanback and Pearce (1981) referred to these non-dominant groups as "subordinate social groups". They noted 4 ways in which the non-dominant groups tend to communicate with the dominant groups. They also asserted that "From the perspective of the dominant group, the behaviors in each form of communication are appropriate. However, the meaning of these behaviors to the members of the lower-statused group are quite different, making them different forms of communication with different implications for the relations among the groups".

In the study of communication, Stanback and Pearce as well as Kramarae used muted group theory to help explain communication patterns and social representation of non-dominant cultural groups Kramarae (1981) believed that "those experiences unique to subordinate group members often cannot be effectively expressed within the confinements of the dominant communication system". She suggested that people within these groups create alternative forms of communication to articulate their experiences. Although, Kramarae used muted group theory to communications strategies of women she suggested that the framework can be applied with equal validity to a number of dominant/non-dominant relationships (Orbe, 1996).

Kramarae (1981) presented three assumptions of muted group theory as applied to communication between men and women concluding that women traditionally have been muted by a male-dominated communications system. Additionally, Kramarae proposed seven hypotheses originating in muted group theory. Standpoint theory was mainly used as a feminist theoretical framework to explore experiences of women as they participate in and oppose their own subordination, however, (Smith, 1987) suggested that the theory had applications for other subordinate groups. A basic tenet of standpoint theory is that it "seeks to include the experiences of subordinate groups within the process of research inquiry in meaningful ways". In other words, the members of the underrepresented groups become co-researchers.

== Theory ==
The theory of co-cultural communication was introduced in 1996 by Mark Orbe, professor in the School of Communication at Western Michigan University, when he found previously used names for the groups under consideration to have negative connotations. He cites previous studies which looked at the communication styles of different co-cultural groups which were referred to by a variety of terms. Orbe was the first to refer to this type of work as "co-cultural communication theory". Orbe states, "in the past researchers have used a variety of terms to describe co-cultural communication: "intracultural" (Sitaram and Cogdell, 1976); "subordinate", "inferior", "minority" (Stanban and Pearce, 1981); "sub-cultural" (Pearson & Nelson, 1991); (Folb, 1994); and "muted group" (Kramarae, 1981)."

Orbe combined the frameworks of muted group theory with that of standpoint theory to arrive at five fundamental concepts which describe co-cultural theory. Orbe states, "co-cultural theory seeks to uncover the commonalities among co-cultural group members as they function in dominant society while substantiating the vast diversity of experiences between and among groups."

== Application ==
Since the introduction of co-cultural theory in "Laying the foundation for co-cultural communication theory: An inductive approach to studying "non-dominant" communication strategies and the factors that influence them" (1996), Orbe has published two works describing the theory and its use as well as several studies on communication patterns and strategies based on different co-cultural groups.

In Orbe's "A Co-cultural communication approach to intergroup relations" (1997), he provides an overview of co-cultural theory, including an explanation of the process by which co-cultural group members strategically select different communications styles

Orbe (1998a) "Constructing co-cultural theory: an explication of culture, power, and communication", presents the theoretical framework for co-cultural theory including the development of the theory, clarification of the co-cultural communication process, and limitations and future directions for its use. Orbe (1998b) "From the standpoint(s) of traditionally muted groups: Explicating a co-cultural communication theoretical model", in which he designated 9 co-cultural orientations based on the intersections of three communication approaches: Non-assertive, Assertive, and Aggressive with 3 preferred outcomes: Separation, Accommodation and Assimilation.

In 2000, Orbe and C. M. Greer presented a paper: "Recognizing the diversity of lived experience: The utility of co-cultural theory in communication and disabilities research" at the annual meeting of the Central States Communication Association, in Detroit. In 2001, Heuman presented "Multiracial/ethnic identity: A co-cultural approach" during the annual meeting of the Central States Communication Association in Cincinnati. During the same meeting Dixon presented "Naming issues in the future of intercultural communication research: The contributions of Mark Orbe's co-cultural theory".

In 2004, Orbe used co-cultural theory as a foundation to explore the processes by which public dialogue can be facilitated across cultural boundaries. Orbe and Spellers (2005) reflected in this book chapter on the origins of co-cultural theory from the perspectives of their different areas of research as well as point to implications for future work.

Orbe & Lapinski (2007)published the design of a self-report measure of the two components of co-cultural theory, preferred outcome and communication approach, and provides evidence from two studies for the construct validity and reliability of the co-cultural theory scales (C-CTS).

Ramirez-Sanchez (2008) examines the possibility of applying co-cultural theory to co-cultural groups that are marginalized in a larger co-cultural context and to "offer a complex cultural context to which co-cultural theory can be applied and generate questions that could serve to enrich the analytical scope of co-cultural theory and its implications".

In 2010, Camara and Orbe published the article "Analyzing Strategic Responses to Discriminatory Acts: A Co-Cultural Communicative Investigation" in the Journal of International and Intercultural Communication. Two authors utilized Orbe's (1998) co-cultural theory model of the 9 communication orientations and 26 communication practices to identify how co-cultural group members response to the acts of discrimination. Two authors used qualitative content analysis to code the participants' stories. The paper also oriented the directions of future research. The 26 communication practices are as follows:

Practice	Brief Description
Averting Controversy	Keeping the conversation away from potentially dangerous or controversial subject areas
Extensive Preparation	Preparing extensively on matters of controversial topics before interacting with dominant group members
Overcompensating	Avoiding discrimination by overt attempts to become a "superstar"
Manipulating Stereotypes	Conforming to common stereotypes in order to exploit the dominant group members for personal gain
Bargaining	Arranging a deal with dominant group members in which both parties agree to ignore co-cultural differences
Dissociating	Avoiding stereotypes within one's co-cultural group
Mirroring	Behaving like a dominant group member to make one's co-cultural identity hidden
Strategic Distancing	Avoiding co-cultural group members to be perceived as an individual
Ridiculing self	Participating in communication that is demeaning to other co-cultural group members
Increasing visibility	Covertly maintaining co-cultural presence within a dominant structure
Dispelling stereotypes	Challenging stereotypes by being one's self
Communicating self	Interacting with dominant group members authentically
Intragroup Networking	Working with co-cultural group members who share philosophies, convictions and goals
Utilizing Liaisons	Working with dominant group members who can be trusted for support, guidance and assistance
Educating Others	Educating dominant group members of co-cultural norms and values
Confronting	Using aggressive methods including ones that may violate the rights of others, to assert one's voice
Gaining Advantage	Talking about co-cultural oppression to provoke dominant group members
Avoiding	Avoiding dominant group members, especially certain activities or locations where an interaction is likely
Maintaining Barriers	Using verbal and nonverbal cues to impose a distance from dominant group members
Exemplifying Strengths	Promoting past accomplishments to society of co-cultural group members
Embracing Stereotypes	Applying co-cultural stereotypes to dominant group members in a positive way
Attacking	Personally attacking dominant group members' self-concept
Sabotaging others	Taking the ability of dominant group members to fully embrace their privilege inherent in dominant structures
Emphasizing Commonalities	Finding common ground with dominant group members while downplaying or ignoring differences
Developing Positive Face	Being polite, considerate and attentive to dominant group members
Censoring Self	Saying nothing when dominant group members say offensive or inappropriate things about co-cultural group members

In 2012, Jungmi Jun, an assistant professor of the School of Journalism and Mass Communications, University of South Carolina published her article "Why Are Asian Americans Silent? Asian Americans' Negotiation Strategies for Communicative Discriminations" in the Journal of International and Intercultural Communication. The author utilized Orbe's co-cultural theory model to explore two questions. One is what types of racially discriminatory messages target Asian Americans; another one is what communicative approaches do Asian Americans apply to negotiate those messages. The paper used content analysis to code 176 stories gained through an online survey. The research found that Asian Americans tend to use nonassertive approaches to respond to racially discriminatory messages due to internal/environmental factors including emotional shock and humiliation, a lack of knowledge of proper responses, peer pressure, and strategic intent.

== Three potential outcomes ==
Co-cultural communication theory, often referred to as co-cultural theory, is a framework within the field of communication studies that focuses on the interactions between dominant cultures and co-cultural groups within a society. Developed by Mark Orbe in 1996, this theory emphasizes the communication strategies and experiences of marginalized or non-dominant groups as they navigate within a predominantly dominant culture.

The theory posits that within any society, there exist co-cultural groups with distinct norms, values, beliefs, and communication practices that differ from those of the dominant or mainstream culture. These co-cultural groups can encompass various communities based on race, ethnicity, gender, sexual orientation, religion, socioeconomic status, and other identity markers.

Co-cultural theory explores how individuals or groups from these co-cultural backgrounds adapt, negotiate, and strategize their communication behaviors within the dominant culture to achieve their goals, overcome challenges, and address the power differentials inherent in the societal structure. Co-Cultural Communication Theory provides a crucial framework for understanding the dynamics of communication between dominant cultures and co-cultural groups.

Understanding the framework developed by Mark Orbe in 1996 is crucial to comprehend how co-culture operates. The co-culture theory was created to provide a voice for minority cultures. Orbe's identified five primary points and five significant factors associated with co-culture theory. These primary factors serve to identify the preferred outcomes concerning intercultural communication.

Co-cultural communication theory posits three potential outcomes in the co-cultural communication process: assimilation, accommodation, or separation.

Co-cultural communication theory highlights three commonly recognized outcomes or strategies: assimilation, accommodation, and separation. These strategies reflect how co-cultural groups navigate their interactions with the dominant culture.

- Assimilation involves the adoption of the dominant culture's norms, values, behaviors, and communication patterns. The goal is to integrate into the dominant society by minimizing cultural differences and adapting to the mainstream culture's expectations. Assimilation aims to gain acceptance, access resources, and reduce discrimination or marginalization experienced by the co-cultural group. However, it can result in the loss of cultural identity, language, and traditions.
  - Assimilation: fitting into the main culture while also diminishing one's own culture.
- Accommodation refers to retaining cultural identity while adapting certain aspects of communication to align with the dominant culture. Accommodation allows for a balance between maintaining one's cultural heritage and making adjustments to facilitate smoother interactions with the dominant culture. Co-cultural groups practicing accommodation might selectively modify their communication styles or behaviors to navigate within the dominant culture without fully assimilating.
  - Accommodation: to encourage one another to maintain their own main culture.
- Separation involves maintaining distinct cultural practices, norms, and communication patterns without seeking assimilation or accommodation into the dominant culture. Co-cultural groups opting for separation emphasize preserving their cultural identity and autonomy. This strategy may lead to limited interaction with the dominant culture, creating boundaries to protect their traditions, language, and values. However, it might also result in social isolation or exclusion from opportunities available within the dominant society.
  - Separation: resisting to become involved or overtaken by the main culture.

These outcomes or strategies are not mutually exclusive and can be fluid, depending on the context, goals, and experiences of co-cultural groups. Individuals or groups may employ a combination of these strategies in different situations or at various stages of their interactions within the dominant culture. Co-cultural Communication Theory recognizes the complexities of these strategies and emphasizes the agency of co-cultural groups in choosing how to navigate their communication and cultural integration within a diverse society.

=== Assimilation ===
Assimilation, as per the co-cultural communication theory, pertains to the phenomenon whereby individuals or groups from co-cultural backgrounds adopt the dominant culture's norms, values, behaviors, and communication patterns. This assimilation typically transpires due to the aspiration to conform to the mainstream culture, gain acceptance, and mitigate communication and social integration obstacles.

Assimilation is a process that often results from a desire to conform to mainstream culture, gain acceptance, and overcome communication and social integration barriers. This decision is driven by various factors, including the need to access resources, opportunities, social mobility, and mitigate discrimination, prejudice, or marginalization experienced by the co-cultural group. Assimilation is often viewed as a coping mechanism used by co-cultural groups to thrive within the dominant societal framework.

However, the process of assimilation is complex and multifaceted, carrying both advantages and disadvantages. On the one hand, assimilation can facilitate smoother interactions and communication between co-cultural groups and the dominant culture, leading to increased access to employment, education, and social networks, thereby enhancing the overall quality of life for individuals or groups seeking assimilation.

On the other hand, assimilation can come at a cost. Individuals may lose their cultural identity, language, traditions, and heritage. The pressure to conform to the dominant culture's norms might lead to feelings of alienation, internal conflict, and a sense of disconnect from one's roots. Co-cultural individuals must navigate between preserving their cultural identity and assimilating into the dominant culture.

Moreover, assimilation does not guarantee complete acceptance or integration into the dominant culture. Co-cultural individuals may face challenges such as cultural bias, microaggressions, or systemic barriers that hinder their full integration, regardless of their efforts to assimilate.

Regarding communication, assimilation entails adopting the language, communication style, and nonverbal cues prevalent in the dominant culture. This may involve altering speech patterns, body language, or even modifying cultural practices to align with the dominant group's expectations. Through assimilation, co-cultural groups aim to bridge communication gaps, minimize misunderstandings, and establish rapport with the dominant culture.

Lastly, assimilation as a strategy within co-cultural communication theory reflects the intricate balance between preserving cultural identity and adapting to the dominant culture. While it may facilitate smoother interactions and increased opportunities, it also poses challenges related to cultural erosion and identity conflict. Understanding assimilation within the framework of co-cultural communication theory is crucial to appreciating the complexities of intercultural interactions and the diverse ways in which individuals negotiate their identities within a multicultural society.

Assimilation can be nonassertive, assertive and or aggressive.

- Aggressive assimilation: They do a lot of mirroring while also ridiculing their own culture to assimilate into the main culture.
- Nonassertive assimilation: They emphasize the common things of their cultures, while also developing a positive face.
- Assertive assimilation: This can be a bit stereotypical, as they bargain and prepare themselves to disassociate with their own culture.

== Feminist standpoint theory ==
Feminist standpoint theory, or FST, is a theory that helps explain that while most people believe that everyone has their own standpoint to share their perspective it is not true for others. People and their opportunity to access standpoints relatively depend on power status and resources that are available to them. According to West and Turner "people in higher-power positions don't achieve standpoints because standpoints require critical reflection on, and opposition to, the power structure" (West & Turner, 2021). FST has three main features that Orbe saw as an excellent support for CCT. First, FST establishes the recognition that people belong to multiple social groups which results in multifaceted identities. Secondly, FST expresses the prominence and influence that power has in the social world. "From the perspective of FST, power privileges members of the dominant group (DGMs) and oppresses members of non-dominant, or co-cultural, groups (NDGMs). NDGMs are not allowed authority and the issues raised by their standpoints are ignored" (West & Turner, 2021). Last, FST highlights the connections between communication behaviors and standpoints. West and Turner (2021) accentuated that there is a pattern with those who share standpoints also practice similar communication styles. Looking to FST, communication is the catalyst for change and that happen through standpoints of the people that do not belong to dominant groups or high-powered individuals.

== Defining assumptions of CCT ==
According to West and Turner (2021), the three assumptions of co-cultural theory are:

1. When a culture's organized in a hierarchy, certain groups are favored over others and power is awarded based on this preference
2. The "lived experiences" of underrepresented groups are valuable and must be identified and embraced.
3. Members of underrepresented groups, although differing from each other in many ways and representing widely different lived experiences, share an "outsider" view of the dominant culture.

=== Meaning ===
The first assumption leads to Orbe's belief that power and hierarchical structure create the rifts between groups; therefore, this results in the creation of dominant and non-dominant groups within the society. The second assumption goes back to the point made in the feminist standpoint theory that people of marginalized groups need to be heard and those people's experiences must be accounted for. Dominant groups tend to put a damper on the potential influence of the non-dominant culture's voices. The third assumption of CCT states that members of non-dominant groups all share a common understanding of what it is to be an "outsider", this can lead to non-dominant groups connecting and communicating because they have a mutual aspect that affects them equally from the society (Orbe & Roberts, 2012).
