= Native Tongue (Elgin novel) =

1984 feminist science fiction novel by Suzette Haden Elgin

- First edition
- Author: Suzette Haden Elgin
- Cover artist: Jill Bauman
- Language: English
- Series: Native Tongue
- Genre: Science fiction
- Publisher: DAW Books
- Publication date: 1984
- Publication place: United States
- Media type: Print (hardback & paperback)
- Pages: 320
- ISBN: 0-87997-945-3
- OCLC: 44270270
- Dewey Decimal: 813/.54 21
- LC Class: PS3555.L42 N38 2000
- Followed by: The Judas Rose

Native Tongue is a 1984 feminist science fiction novel by American writer Suzette Haden Elgin, the first book in her series of the same name. The trilogy is centered in a future dystopian American society where the 19th Amendment was repealed in 1991 and women have been stripped of civil rights. A group of women, part of a worldwide group of linguists who facilitate human communication with alien races, create a new language for women as an act of resistance. Elgin created that language, Láadan, and instructional materials are available.

== Plot summary ==
Native Tongue follows Nazareth, a talented female linguist in the 22nd century – generations after the repeal of the 19th Amendment. Nazareth is part of a small group of linguists "bred" to become perfect interstellar translators.

Nazareth looks forward to retiring to the Barren House – where women past childbearing age go as they wait to die – but learns that the women of the Barren Houses are creating a language to help them break free of male dominance.

== Reception ==
In 1984, Bill Muir of The Hamilton Spectator described the book as "a highly controversial novel that's sure to arouse charged emotions". In 1985, Kelvin Johnston writing for The Observer stated "[...] though it is not as ponderous and overintellectualised as Doris Lessing's ventures into the genre, it is of that category". In 1986, Barry Seddon of the Manchester Evening News called the book a "didactic bore".

Elgin has said about the book:

Native Tongue was a thought experiment, with a time limit of ten years. My hypothesis was that if I constructed a language designed specifically to provide a more adequate mechanism for expressing women's perceptions, women would (a) embrace it and begin using it, or (b) embrace the idea but not the language, say "Elgin, you've got it all wrong!" and construct some other "women's language" to replace it. The ten years went by, and neither of those things happened; Láadan got very little attention, even though SF3 actually published its grammar and dictionary and I published a cassette tape to go with it. Not once did any feminist magazine (or women's magazine) ask me about the language or write a story about it.

The Klingon language, which is as "masculine" as you could possibly get, has had a tremendous impact on popular culture—there's an institute, there's a journal, there were bestselling grammars and cassettes, et cetera, et cetera; nothing like that happened with Láadan. My hypothesis therefore was proved invalid, and the conclusion I draw from that is that in fact women (by which I mean women who are literate in English, French, German, and Spanish, the languages in which Native Tongue appeared) do not find human languages inadequate for communication.

— Interview with Suzette Haden Elgin

The book is occasionally cited for its theoretical contributions to Feminist thought, particularly Feminist separatism

== Awards and adaptation ==
The book was nominated for the 1985 Locus Award for Best Science Fiction Novel and the 1985 Ditmar Award for International Fiction.

Until Media has acquired the rights to the trilogy and was, as of 2019, planning a screen adaptation.

== See also ==
- The Handmaid's Tale, a dystopic speculative fiction novel by Margaret Atwood
- The Languages of Pao, science fiction novel in which manipulation of language is used to shape a civilization
- Nü Shu, the Chinese system of women's writing

== Sources ==
- Mohr, Dunja M. Worlds Apart: Dualism and Transgression in Contemporary Female Dystopias. Jefferson, NC, McFarland, 2005. [extensive chapter on the Native Tongue Series]
- Interview with Suzette Haden Elgin @ Womenwriters.net. 1999.
