= Testosterone poisoning =

Popular, humorous term for excess masculinity

Testosterone poisoning is a popular term used to explain behaviors that are deemed excessively masculine. It is also used by transfeminine people, including transgender women and nonbinary individuals, to describe the negative effects that testosterone has had on their bodies.

== Origins ==
An early printed reference to "testosterone poisoning" came in 1975 from actor Alan Alda. In a parody of self-help writing, Alda diagnosed the "ailment" of masculinity and offered methods for its "cure". He wrote:

Everyone knows that testosterone, the so-called male hormone, is found in both men and women. What is not so well known, is that men have an overdose... Until recently it has been thought that the level of testosterone in men is normal simply because they have it. But if you consider how abnormal their behavior is, then you are led to the hypothesis that almost all men are suffering from testosterone poisoning.

Ten years later, that same sentence from Alda's article was quoted in the 1985 book A Feminist Dictionary.

Carl Sagan gave the phrase more publicity when he praised Moondance magazine writer Daniela Gioseffi's American Book Award winner Women on War as follows: "A book of searing analysis and cries from the heart on the madness of war. Why is the half of humanity with a special sensitivity to the preciousness of life, the half untainted by testosterone poisoning, almost wholly unrepresented in defense establishments and peace negotiations worldwide?" A Los Angeles Times op-ed piece accused Sagan of "pompously inform[ing] us that the whole planet is imminently endangered by 'testosterone poisoning'".

Bruce Tremper used the term in The Avalanche Review, stating that being "a man" is best proven by dying "a stupendously violent death".

== Psychology ==
A 1996 Psychology Today article referred to the phrase as "only a joke", but noted that a study about testosterone and male employment had shown that testosterone levels were lower for successful new male employees at a southern U.S. oil firm than they were for new male employees who had quit their jobs or been terminated.

Berenbaum et al. (1997) said that exposure to high levels of androgens in utero is associated with higher levels of adult aggression. Mazur et al. (1998) stated that males with higher testosterone levels tend to be slightly more aggressive than other males. The authors suggested that higher testosterone levels were a result of aggressive behavior, not a cause of it.

In Family and Friends' Guide to Domestic Violence, Elaine Weiss wrote that "deadly testosterone poisoning" (DTP) is one of "many misunderstandings about abusive men". She continued: "[This] is not a war of the hormones, an inevitable biological clash between estrogen and testosterone. If it were, then there would be more of it; every heterosexual relationship would be abusive".

McDermott (2007) found a significant positive relationship between levels of testosterone and aggression. However, the link between testosterone and aggression was questioned in a 2010 study published in Nature. According to that study, "a single dose of testosterone in women causes a substantial increase in fair bargaining behaviour, thereby reducing bargaining conflicts and increasing the efficiency of social interactions. However, subjects who believed that they received testosterone—regardless of whether they actually received it or not—behaved much more unfairly than those who believed that they were treated with placebo."

== Usage ==
Antonia Feitz protested the use of the expression in a 1999 essay in the Australian Daily Issues Paper, calling it hate speech.

Beth Gallagher's Salon.com essay "Road Sows", which discussed sports utility vehicles, asserted that "Not long ago, if you found yourself being tailed within an inch of your life by one of these monsters, you could be reasonably sure that testosterone poisoning was at work. But now I don't even bother to check my makeup — the macho creep back there is as likely to be the soccer mom next door, or even her mom..." Several readers submitted "testosterone poisoning" to a 2001 Atlantic Monthly competition to find a male equivalent for hysteria (which was originally regarded as a female-only condition). Dr. Karl Albrecht made testosterone poisoning a synonym for male chauvinism in his 2002 book The Power of Minds at Work: Organizational Intelligence in Action; he described the phenomenon as one of 17 basic syndromes of dysfunction.

In a 2003 Wall Street Journal essay, Kay S. Hymowitz chided Western feminists for neglecting the rights of Third World women in Muslim countries; she wrote: "There is no need, in their minds, to distinguish between Osama, Saddam, and Bush: They're all suffering from testosterone poisoning".

Magazine editor Tina Brown used the phrase thematically in a 2005 Washington Post essay about the downfall of Harvard University president Larry Summers and the problems of Disney's former embattled CEO Michael Eisner.

The term is also sometimes used in a humorous context by transfeminine people, including transgender women, to describe how testosterone has damaged their bodies. Masculine secondary sex characteristics such as facial hair, muscle growth, and a deepened voice are often jokingly referred to as symptoms of testosterone poisoning in transgender contexts. While this usage of the term is far less common than the original, it also uses humor to criticize the effects of testosterone on the body.

== See also ==
- Behavioral endocrinology
- Feminist separatism
- Gender essentialism
- Gender roles
- Hormones and behavior
- Hypogonadism
- Sexism
- Soy boy
- Toxic masculinity
