= Muted group theory =

Theory of communication about marginalized groups

Muted Group Theory (MGT) is a communication theory developed by cultural anthropologist Edwin Ardener and feminist scholar Shirley Ardener in 1975, that exposes the sociolinguistic power imbalances that can suppress social groups' voices.

Mutedness refers to inequitable barriers that disallow a social group from expressing themselves. The theory details the interlinked relationship between a dominant group and subordinate group(s) through two pathways:

1. The dominant group constructs the language system that is imbued with social norms and vocabulary
2. Subordinate group(s) assimilate by learning the dominant language to communicate

Subordinate groups may not be able to articulate their thoughts clearly to the dominant group, further complicating the translation process and resulting in misinterpretation. Muted group theory also applies to marginalized groups whose voices may be disregarded by the dominant group. Essentially speaking, language in its derivatives and usage pertain only to a single-axis representation, and inherent understanding, of what is a multi-axis reality.

Muted group theory relies on the theoretical framework built by Edwin Ardener and feminist scholars as well as key concepts including mutedness and the muting process that marginalized groups face. Muted group theory is extended into real-world applications including mass media, social rituals, the workplace, politics, education, theology and is critiqued by other theorists that evaluate the differentiation in communication styles between dominant and subordinate groups.

== Overview ==
=== History ===
In 1968, Edwin Ardener pointed out a phenomenon where anthropologists had difficulties reproducing models of the society from women's perspectives, if they (the models) do not conform to those generated by men.

In 1971, Shirley Ardener cited instances from feminism movements to articulate how women as a muted group used body symbolism to justify their actions and arguments in her article "Sexual Insult and Female Militancy".

In 1975, Shirley Ardener reprinted Edwin's paper "The Interpretation of Ritual,1972" and included her sexual insult text in the book "Perceiving Women", for which she wrote an intro.

=== Origin ===
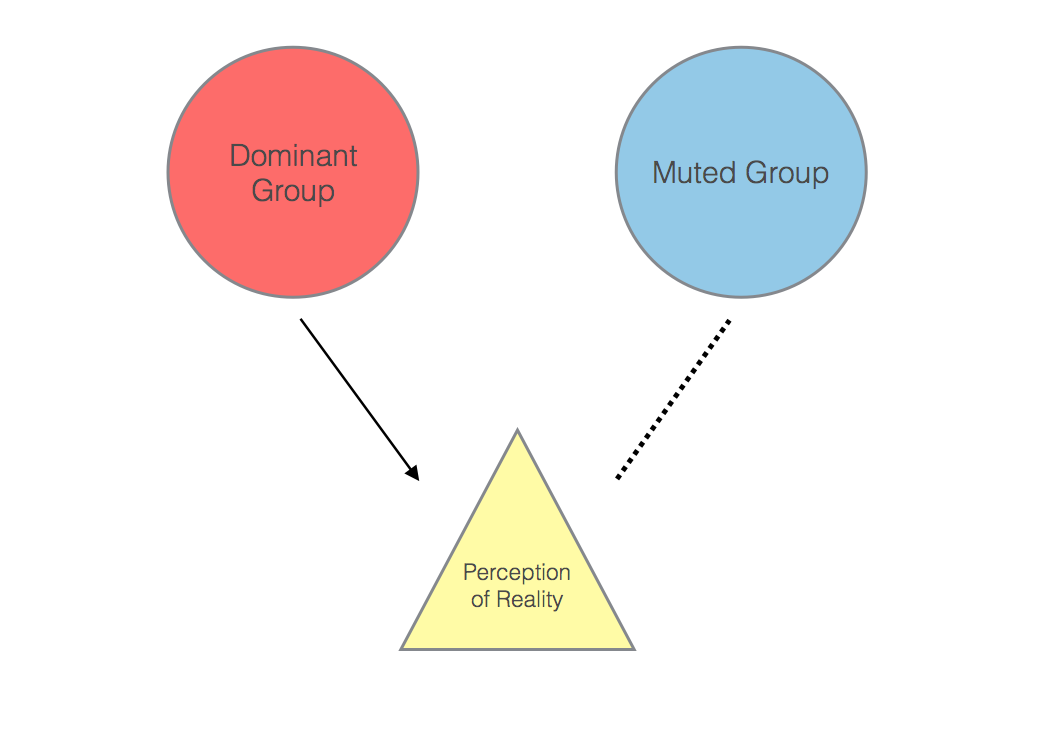
Ardener's Dominant Group vs Muted Group

British anthropologist, Edwin Ardener, fleshed out muted group theory in the field of cultural anthropology. The first formulation of MGT emerges from one of Edwin Ardener's short essays, entitled "Belief and the Problem of Women." In social anthropology, the problem of women is divided in two parts: technical and analytical. The technical problem is that although half of the population is female, ethnographers have neglected them in social anthropological studies. Ardener added that women were reportedly more difficult to access and interview, especially due to factors including "they giggle when young, snort when old, reject the question and the like."

Ardener wrote that "those trained in ethnography evidently have a bias towards the kinds of models that men are ready to provide (or to concur in) rather than towards any that women might provide." Ardener argued that men produce and control symbolic production in society.

The technicality interlinks with the analytical aspect of the problem of women through the question: "[…] if the models of society made by most ethnographers tend to be models derived from the male portion of that society, how does the symbolic weight of the other mass of persons express itself?"

After conducting an experiment with the information in his essay, the results indicated that the male point of view dominates society. The graph shows that the standard solid line reflects men's dominance. In contrast, women's perspectives is considered insignificant, falling into the muted category with the graph's broken line. According to Ardener, because male-based understandings of society represent the dominant worldview, certain groups are silenced or muted.

He wrote: "In these terms if the male perception yields a dominant structure, the female one is a muted structure." As part of the critical approach to the world, Ardener uses MGT to explore the power and societal structure in relation to the dynamism between dominant and subordinated groups. Moreover, Ardener's concept of muted groups does not only apply to women but can also be applied to marginalized groups within social structures.

=== Expansion – muted group theory through the feminist lens ===
Feminist scholars Cheris Kramarae, Barrie Thorne and Nancy Henley explored sociolinguistics that "defines, deprecates, and ignores women." They limited their research especially in the gender culture, whereas the Ardeners were applying MGT across different cultures. The scholars discovered that "male dominance affects more than just the way sexes speak but the content and structure of the English language. Women are often defined by their relation to men (“Miss/Mrs.” or “Harold's Widow”) while men have more autonomous varied linguistic status." Kramarae attributed the series of phenomena to the "man-made language" conception and stated that women would be identified as a muted group.

Inspired from Kramarae's pieces, scholars Anita Taylor and M.J. Hardman observed that the dominant language appears to dismiss concepts and values that are significant to women but not to men.

Women and men that are of the same social rank are usually addressed by asymmetrical usages of first and last name (women are usually called by first name while men are by the last name); or associations of certain words with women are formed to maintain the social stereotype (sewing, cooking, house chores, etc.).

In modern society, communication in virtual communities have contributed to the formation of relationships.

"Before a woman can write exactly as she wishes to write, she has many difficulties to face. To begin with, there is a technical difficulty- so simple, apparently, in reality, so baffling,- that the very form of the sentence does not fit her. It is a sentence made by men," said Virginia Woolf.

=== Key concepts ===
==== Mutedness ====
Mutedness occurs when individuals of a subordinate group struggle to fairly enunciate their thought processes, without the external pressure to assimilate to the dominant group's established language. Consequently, the loss of autonomy could lead to feeling overlooked, muffled, and invisible. As gender communication scholar Cheris Kramarae states, social interaction and communication create the current language structure. Since the latter was mainly built by men, men have an advantage over women.

As Cowan points out, "'mutedness' does not refer to the absence of voice but to a kind of distortion where subordinate voices…are allowed to speak but only in the confines of the dominant communication system."

==== Muted group ====
The muted group or subordinated group is relative to the dominant group. The premise of MGT is that members of the marginalized group(s) would mute themselves without coercion, which is based on the fact that the silencing of muted group(s) is a socially shared phenomenon. According to Gerdrin, muting or silencing is a social phenomenon based on the tacit understanding that within a society there are dominant and non-dominant groups. Thus, the muting process presupposes a collective understanding of who is in power and who is not. The discrepancies in power result in the "oppressor" and "the oppressed." Kramarae points out that the muted group as "the oppressed" are people who don't have a "public recognized vocabulary" to express their experience. Their failure to articulate their ideas lead to their doubt about "the validity of their experience" and "the legitimacy of their feelings." Kramarae also addresses that gender, race, and class hierarchies, are factors where muted groups are supported by "political, educational, religious, legal, and media systems." Muted groups' lack of power usually keeps them at the margin of society.

== The "muting" process ==
=== Muting methods ===
Several scholars have researched and studied how the "muting" process occurs. According to West and Turner (2019), there are four methods that can cause muting: ridicule, ritual, control and harassment. A central factor that contributes to these silencing methods is the trivialization of the lexicon and speech patterns that is often used to describe women's activities.

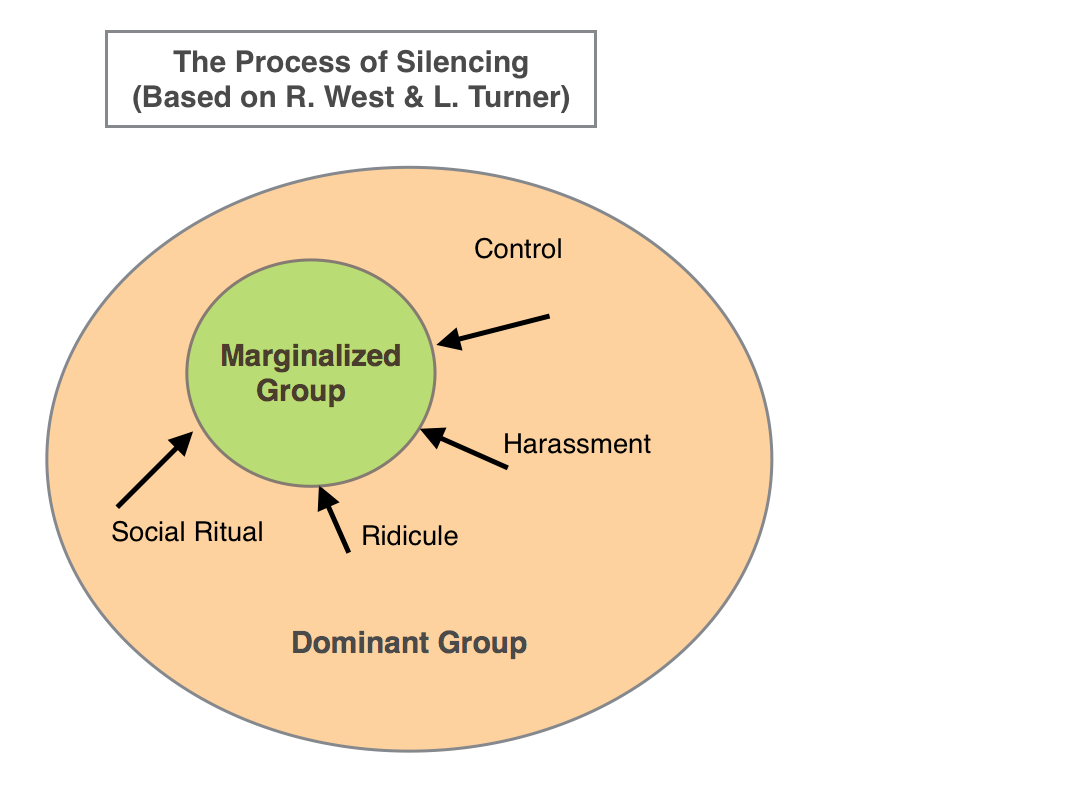
Graphic highlights the ways marginalized groups are silenced

Ridicule

Houston and Kramarae postulate that ridicule has muted women, such as trivializing their opinions, ideas, concerns and censoring women's voices. According to their research, women can be ridiculed in the health care system, family hierarchies, educational policies and their bodies have been used as props in political debates.

Ritual

Kramarae reasoned that women's voices can be censored by social rituals in institutions that embrace women's subservience. A typical example is wedding ceremony.

Control

Scholars pointed out that many social decisions are controlled by men, including history book contents, mainstream media, communication practices, etc. Men's tactical method to interrupt particularly women during a conversation is a frequently used controlling form.

Harassment

In many public spaces, harassment can occur on the street, workplace, classrooms and even in digital contexts. It usually would be naturalized by men, and women's experiences and concerns about harassment would be ignored or despised in the context.

Other than verbal communications mentioned above, nonverbal cues are also situated in the “muting” process such as demeanor, distribution of space, touch, eye contact, and visibility.

=== Strategies of resistance ===
According to Houston & Kramarae (1991) and Ezster Hargittai & Aaron Shaw (2015), the implementation of the following strategies can mitigate experiences in the "muting" process:

- Name the silencing factors, whether it has been men or news agencies.
- Reclaim, elevate and celebrate women's discourse.
- Create new words for the language system that are inclusive of marginalized groups, gendered words and experiences.
- Use media platforms (traditional and new) to give voice to these groups.

== Kramarae's three assumptions ==
According to Cheris Kramarae, MGT makes three assumptions :

=== Assumption #1 ===
The different experiences caused by the division of labor result in the different perceptions that women and men hold towards the world

Kramarae believes that women integrating men's language into their everyday lives is a disadvantage because women and men are vastly different and perceive the world differently. This stems from the distinction between the meanings of the words "sex" and "gender." She reasons that communication between men and women is not on a balanced level because language is invented by men, ultimately permitting them to take charge. With the integration of Symbolic Interactionism Theory, it demonstrates that "the extent of knowing is the extent of naming." When applied to MGT, women's voices are muffled because men are the namers.

=== Assumption #2 ===
Women find it difficult to articulate their ideas in comparison to men's dominant experiences

Kramarae argues that English is a "[hu]man-made language" and that it "embodies the perspectives of the masculine more than the feminine," while supporting "the perceptions of white middle-class males." Kramarae also explains that men's control over language has produced an abundance of derogatory words for women and their speech patterns. Some of these include names such as "slut", "whore", and "easy lay", along with speech patterns such as "gossiping", "whining", and "bitching". When analyzing words connoting promiscuity, there are fewer male-specific terms. Some existing names are praised in a sexually acceptable manner such as "stud", "player", and "pimp" (p. 465). Kramarae suggests the vulgar terms targeted toward women creates a distorted social construct that situates women in a disadvantageous position. She believes that "words constantly ignored may eventually come to be unspoken and perhaps even unthought." This can lead women to doubt themselves from speaking up and allow men to sit on the pedestal.

=== Assumption #3 ===
Women have to endure a translation process when speaking to participate in social life

Kramarae states that women need to choose their words carefully in public. According to Kramarae, this is because "what women want to say and can say best cannot be said easily because the language template is not of their own making." Another example of the male-dominated language Kramarae discusses is in the public speaking arena where women frequently infuse sports and war analogies to converse with their male audiences. In historical retrospect, prominent authors, theorists, politicians, news anchors and scientists have long dominated the market. Their prominence permits them to hand down the "facts" about society that women should know to be true. Kramarae also believes that "males have more difficulty than females in understanding what members of the other gender mean." Feminist scholar Dale Spender supports the idea that language, and society in general, is traditionally male-centric: "Masculinity is the unmarked form: the assumption is that the world is male unless proven otherwise. Femininity is the marked form: it is the proof of otherwise." If masculinity, and their socially constructed language, are considered as unmarked forms, then any marked form must be analyzed through a translation process to actively communicate with others.

== Applications ==
=== Contexts ===
Marginalized groups in a given culture or society experience the muting process in social contexts including but not limited to:

==== Mass media ====
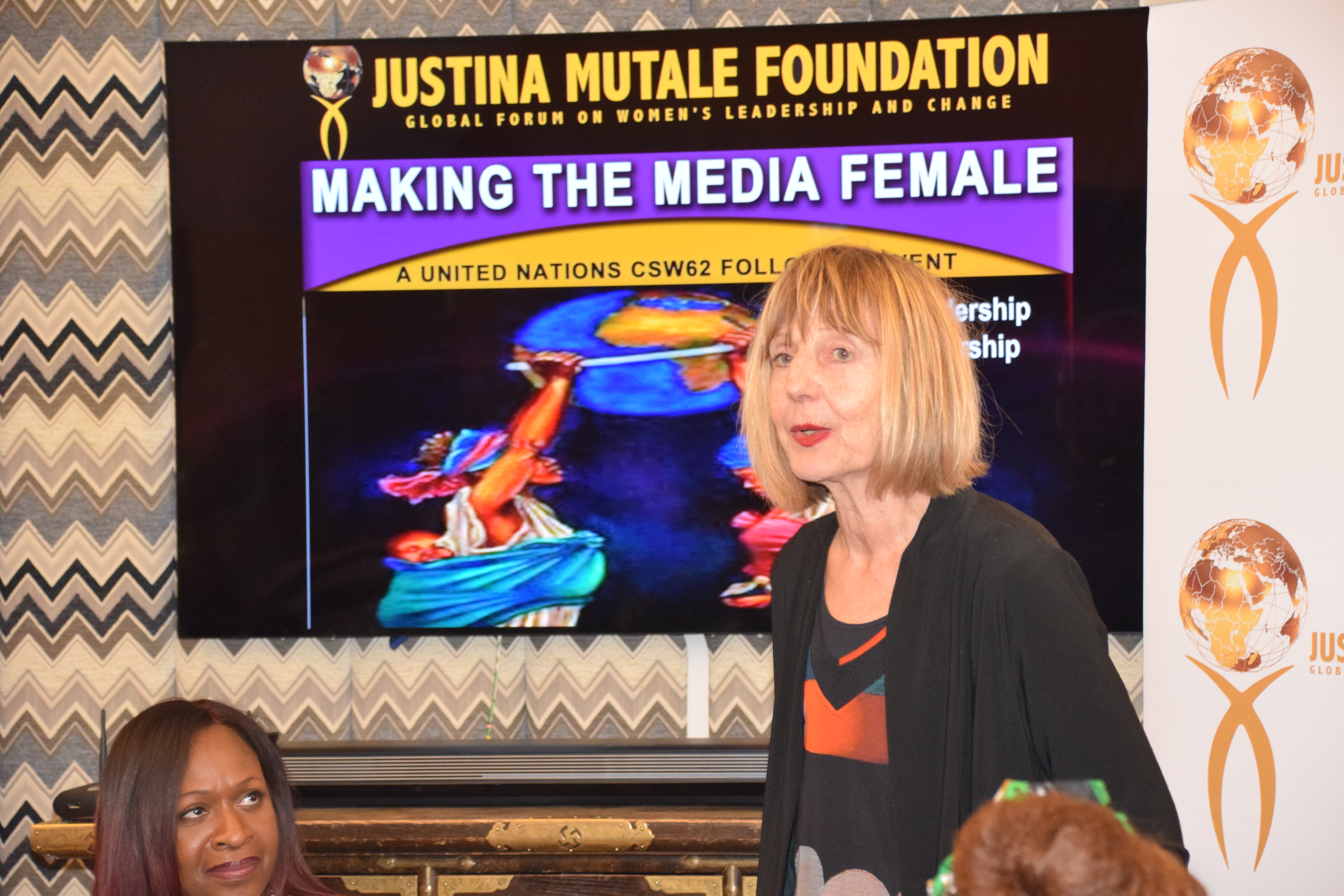
Carol Stone, a CBE award-winning journalist, discusses the importance of equitable reporting at the Justina Mutale Foundation's "Making the Media Female" event in London.

According to Kramarae, women have been prevented from having stage presence on mass media, misrepresented in history and locked out of the editorial publishing business until 1970. The predominance of male gatekeepers, who are defined as editors and other arbiters of a culture, determine which books, essays, poetry, plays, film scripts, etc. will appear in the mass media. Similarly, Pamela Creedon argues that in the mid-1970s there was an increase of women in the male-dominated profession of journalism.

In "The Status of Women in the U.S. Media 2014", The Women's Media Centre researchers explore the current status of women in the mass media industry. The report compiles 27,000 pieces of content among "20 of the most widely circulated, read, and viewed, and listened TV networks, newspapers, news wires, and online news in the United States." The results show that women (36.1%) are significantly out-numbered by men (63.4%). Several studies show that while men mainly report on "hard" news, women are often relegated to cover "soft" news that mutes and prevents them from participating in contexts crucial to civil discourse.

Although the Women's Media Centre study is U.S.-centric, marginalized groups are muted in other country's media landscapes as well. For example, Aparna Hebbani and Charise-Rose Wills explored how Muslim women have been muted in the Australian mass media sphere. Their study showed that women that wear a hijab or burqa are inaccurately and negatively connoted in Australian mass media. According to the authors, Muslim women represent a muted group who cannot entirely incorporate their experiences, views, and perspectives in Australian media. Thus, there is a social hierarchy that is privileging certain groups via Australian mass media. Their findings reveal that Muslim women are attempting to find their cultural space in this media landscape by engaging and interacting with producers, directors and news anchors behind Australian mass media to negotiate their muted position.

==== Social rituals ====
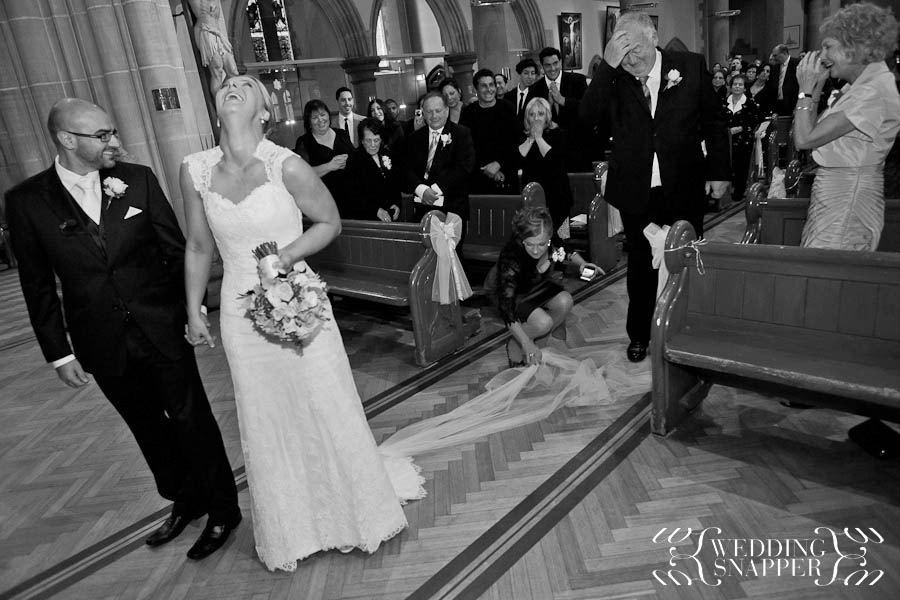
Application in social rituals- A father gives his daughter away at the wedding ceremony.

Muting occurs in social rituals. Kramarae suggests that many elements within wedding ceremonies situate women in a silenced position. For example, the fact that the father of the bride "gives her away" to the groom, the bride is placed to the left of the minister which is considered less privileged than the groom, the groom announces his vows first and the groom is asked to kiss the bride, are all factors that contribute to women's subordination to men.

There are some conventional stereotypes attached to men and women in society when they deviate from social norms, resulting in "negative feedback". An example of societal criticism would be women down on one knee proposing marriage to men. For instance, when they attempt to emulate their male counterparts' behavior, they are "discriminated" and "discouraged".

As Catharine MacKinnon (one of the leading voices in the feminist legal movement) suggests, the law perceives women similarly as men perceive women. Likewise to socially constructed language, the legal system has been created, defined, and interpreted mostly by men. In the context of unequal power relations between men and women, MacKinnon proposes new standards to define and evaluate sexual harassment and sex-related issues considered as the consequence of unwanted impositions of sexual requirements. Finley argues that there has been a recent interest in feminist jurisprudence and legal scholarship inspired by the law's failure to see that despite the legal removal of barriers, sexes are not socially equal.

==== The workplace ====
In 1940s America, women flooded the workplace while men were at war. After wars fizzled out, society did not encourage women's participation in operating production lines in the workplace. Instead, male dominance was embraced.

The "organizational structure" is maintained by men's socially constructed language. Western patriarchal cultures tend to privilege masculine styles of language while marginalizing feminine styles. In the workplace, organizational communication is implemented to help fulfill an employee's work responsibilities. However, many organization goals are met by the usage of "male-preferential" language that focus on terms such as "economic gain" and "performance improved." Women are typically excluded and have to use "male preferential" language to attain success.

For instance, women's voices tend to be muted within emails in organizations. Men's email language is characterized by opinions, facts, assertiveness. In contrast, women's email language consists of revealing personal information, references to emotion and using many adjectives.

Additionally, female victims who face sexual harassment by the dominant group are subject to being muted in the workplace. In a male-dominated workplace, women are perceived to be "the verbal minority". Organizations rarely encourage sexual harassment to be discussed openly and call for confidentiality when dealing with complaints. Furthermore, women rarely go through formal channels of reporting sexual harassment for a number of reasons including: "expecting their complaint to be ignored or trivialized by the male dominant group, fear of not being protected from retaliation, worry that the male dominated hierarchy will 'team up' against them, or that their time will be wasted due to the organization's ineffective sexual harassment policy." Subordinate groups are trusted less than white men in the workplace.

Some researchers suggest to take an action-research approach to attain organizational gender equity by addressing "entrenched systems of power". They believe that "collaboration as both a principle and as a strategy is central in bringing about generative and organizational change." Action research involves researchers engaging as active participants in the study, continuously refining key variables and constantly implementing and evaluating new data.

==== Politics ====
Independent parties have emerged since World War II to offer alternative candidates for election. However, most of these parties operate only in "circumscribed regions or with very narrow platforms". Prentice studied the impact of the third party, i.e., candidates from non-major parties, in public debate. He discovered that there have been few studies about third parties by 2003 and even though third-party candidates are involved in public campaign debates, they remain inarticulate and ignored due to the judgment by "standard of the political rhetoric and worldview of the major parties."

Prentice points out that major parties usually interfere with the free expression of third parties through three ways: "ignoring their claims, appearing confused (verbally or nonverbally) by the claims, or actively attacking the claims made". He also noticed that the debate questions are structured in a way that reflects major parties' worldviews, which results in third party's mutedness. In order to participate and articulate their own worldview, third-party candidates have to transform their ideas to match the major parties' models through emphasizing the agreements with the majority rather than the differences and sometimes may lead them to make statements that can be misinterpreted.

In an electoral system where career continuity is valued, women candidates are placed at a disadvantaged position competing with their male opponents. Stereotypical opinions like women as default caretakers of domestic business impose disadvantages on women, as they are thought to be incapable of being consistent with their work for family reasons. Disadvantages imposed by deep-rooted stereotypes and how electoral rules orient voters' predisposition reduce women's chance of success and render women "muted" in the political atmosphere.

==== Education ====
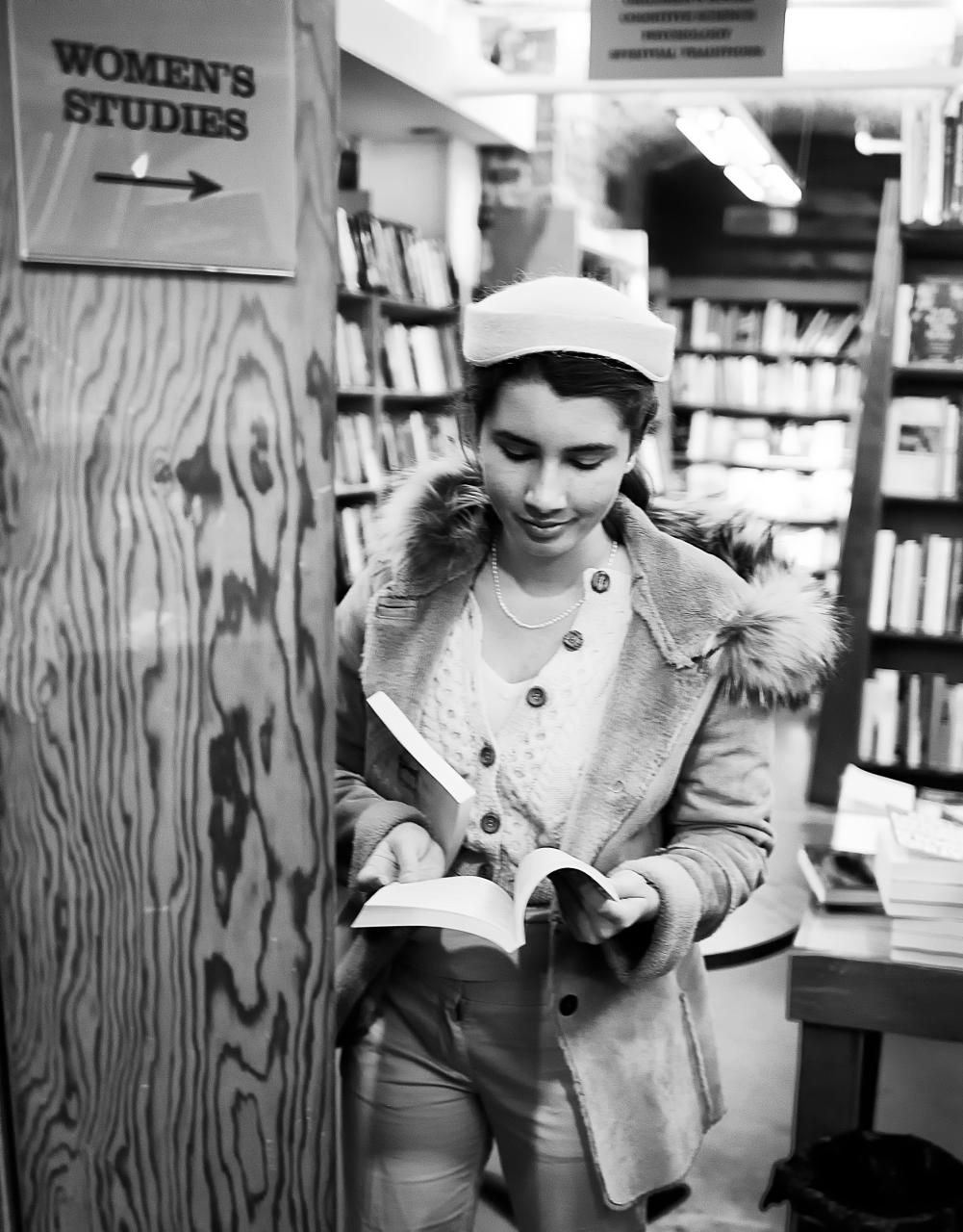
Application in education - "Women's studies"

The classroom can perpetually mute women. Women's education in the United States has progressed over the years, but academia is still male-dominated. Kramarae has raised several suggestions for more inclusive educational environments, such as embedding "women's humor", "speechlessness", and ways to tackle "abusive language". Branching more diverse language systems in academia can prevent the continual muting of marginalized groups.

In the classroom, men and women use language to communicate in distinct mannerisms with other members of their gender. Women tend to bond with each other through the descriptive process of their problems, while men bond with each other using "playful insults" and "put downs." In classroom discussions, men tend to believe that they have to dominate the class discussion while women are typically muted in their seats.

Allyson Jule, Dean of the Faculty of Education, Community, and Health Development at the University of Fraser Valley in British Columbia, Canada noted that in gendered classroom discourse, "One of the themes running through much feminist pedagogical work is that classrooms can be sites of struggle— struggle to belong, struggle to matter, struggle to learn, struggle to speak aloud, and struggle to participate—and often passive struggles on the part of many girls."

Houston argues that to properly create a positive educational reform for students, it can be helpful to update the curriculum and emphasize the importance of "woman-centered communication" education. Women's Studies (WS) has evolved and grown over the years in higher education. In modern society, there is a need for seasoned faculty to be on initiatives such as WS programs, African American Programs and other programs centralized on sharing marginalized groups' stories.

Beyond the classroom, rape culture influences sexual violence on college campuses. Rape myths, men's athletics, and fraternity culture actively mute female students from speaking out, and eventually affects college administrators and students. Every two minutes in the United States, someone is raped, and the chances of being that victim are four times greater for a college female student than for any other age group.

==== Theology ====
In the 1970s, feminists rejected all religions. This pertinent issue has been addressed in many well-known feminist texts, such as Kate Millett's Sexual Politics and Andrea Dworkin's Right-Wing Women, the second-wave feminism considered religion as an anti-women force founded by men to subordinate women. According to Sheila Jeffreys, "religion founds men's authority over women and makes resistance difficult, because fear of divine punishment keeps women in their place."

== Other muted elements ==
According to MGT, marginalized groups' voices are muted because the individuals' factors do not synchronize with the standards set by dominant groups. These elements include but are not limited to:

=== Language ===
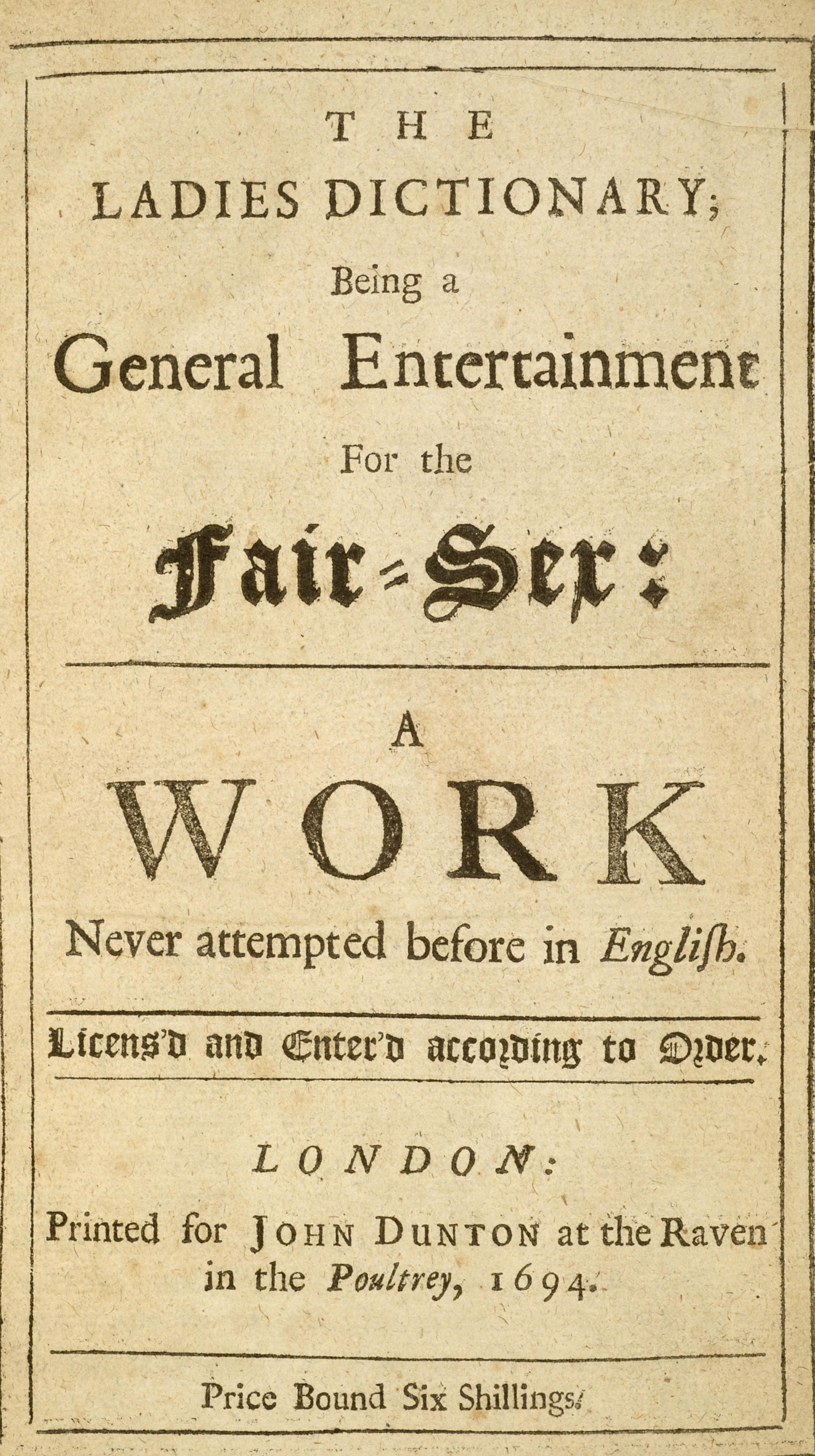
Application in language- A Feminist Dictionary

According to Kissack, male-dominated language has reigned avenues of communication. In corporate organizations, women are expected to use "female preferential" to mingle with their female peers. The primary difference between the two is "male-preferential" language consists of details such as opinions and facts whereas "female-preferential" language is made up of personal details, emotions reflected in the conversations, and a high usage of adjectives. Moreover, according to socialist historian Sheila Rowbotham, language is considered to be a tool manipulated by superior people of social rank to conserve their status quo.

Muted group theory has "recognized that women's voices are muted in Western society so that their experiences are not fully represented in language and has argued that women's experiences merit linguistic recognition." Kramarae states that to change muted group status we also need to change dictionaries. Traditional dictionaries rely on the majority of their information from male literary sources. These male sources have the power to exclude significant words to women or created by women. Expanding on this idea, Kramarae and Paula Treichler created A Feminist Dictionary with words they believed Merriam-Webster defined on male ideas. For example, the word "Cuckold" is defined as "the husband of an unfaithful wife" in Merriam Webster. However, there is no term for a wife who has an unfaithful husband. She is simply called a wife. Another example Kramarae defined was the word "doll". She defined "doll" as "a toy playmate given to, or made by children". Some adult males continue their childhood by labeling adult female companions "dolls". The feminist dictionary includes up to 2,500 words to empower women's linguistic ability and ultimately change their muted status. Long argues that although socially constructed diction shapes society, she argues that women can bravely take up physical and political space to air their ideas.

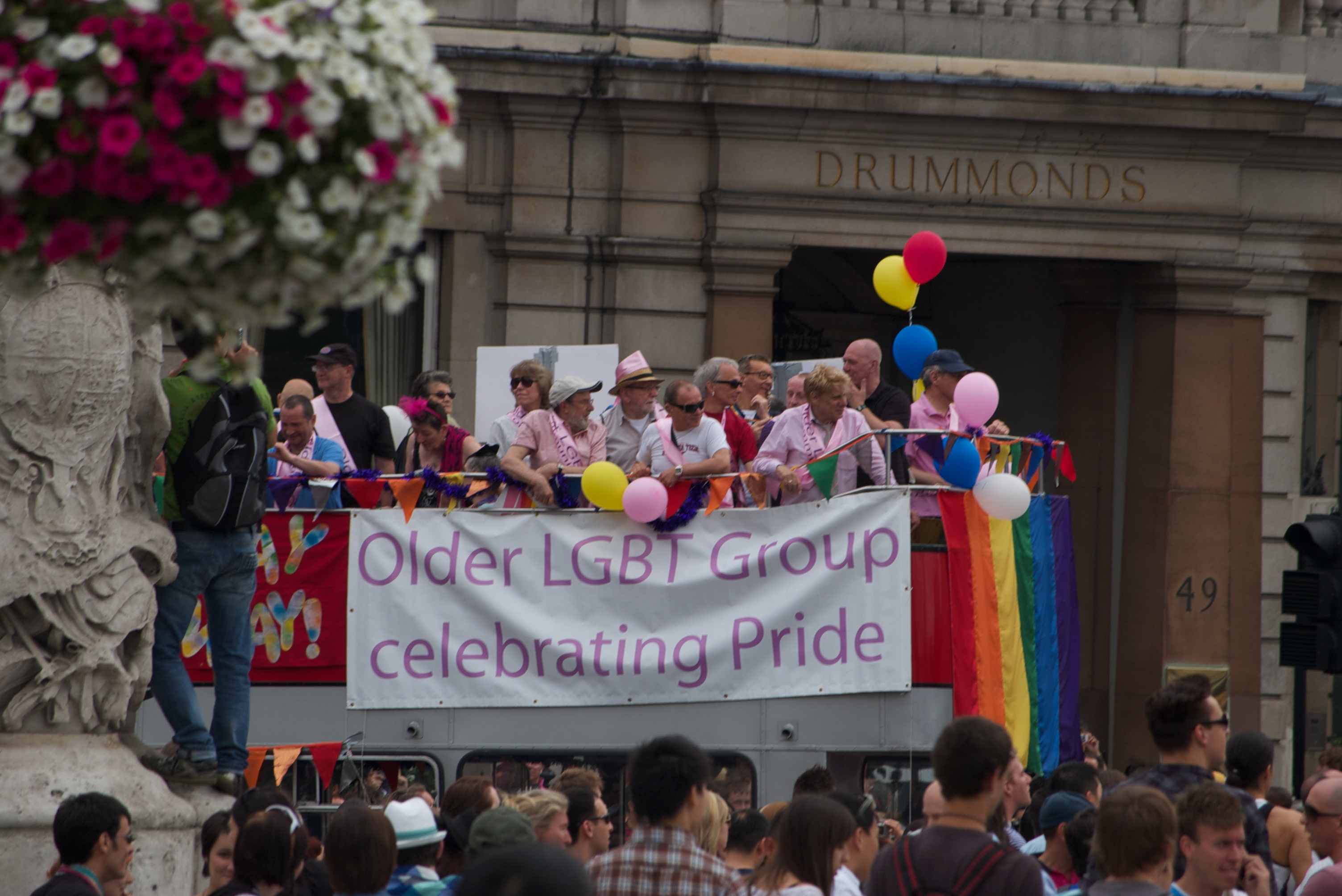
Application in LGBT study - "Older LGBT Group celebrating Pride" in Trafalgar Square, London

=== Sexuality ===
LGBT groups are considered marginalized and muted in our society. The dominant groups who "hold privileged positions within society" have developed social norms that marginalize LGBT groups. Although LGBT individuals do not necessarily share the same identity, they share similar experiences of being marginalized by the dominant groups.

LGBT individuals who have a mixed racial background are also cast under muted group theory. For instance, a writing and rhetoric student at Florida International University, a public Hispanic-serving institution said, "I'm half Latin and half Caucasian. I look more Caucasian than Latin. That in itself allows me certain rights and to be heard much louder than my Latino brethren. When people find out I'm gay when I'm trying to have my voice heard about anything related to politics or human rights, I am muted a bit."

As Gross notes, "For many oppressed groups the experience of commonality is largely the commonality of their difference from, and oppression by, the dominant culture." LGBT groups must adopt certain communication strategies to match the social norms to guarantee assimilation within the dominant culture.

=== Race ===
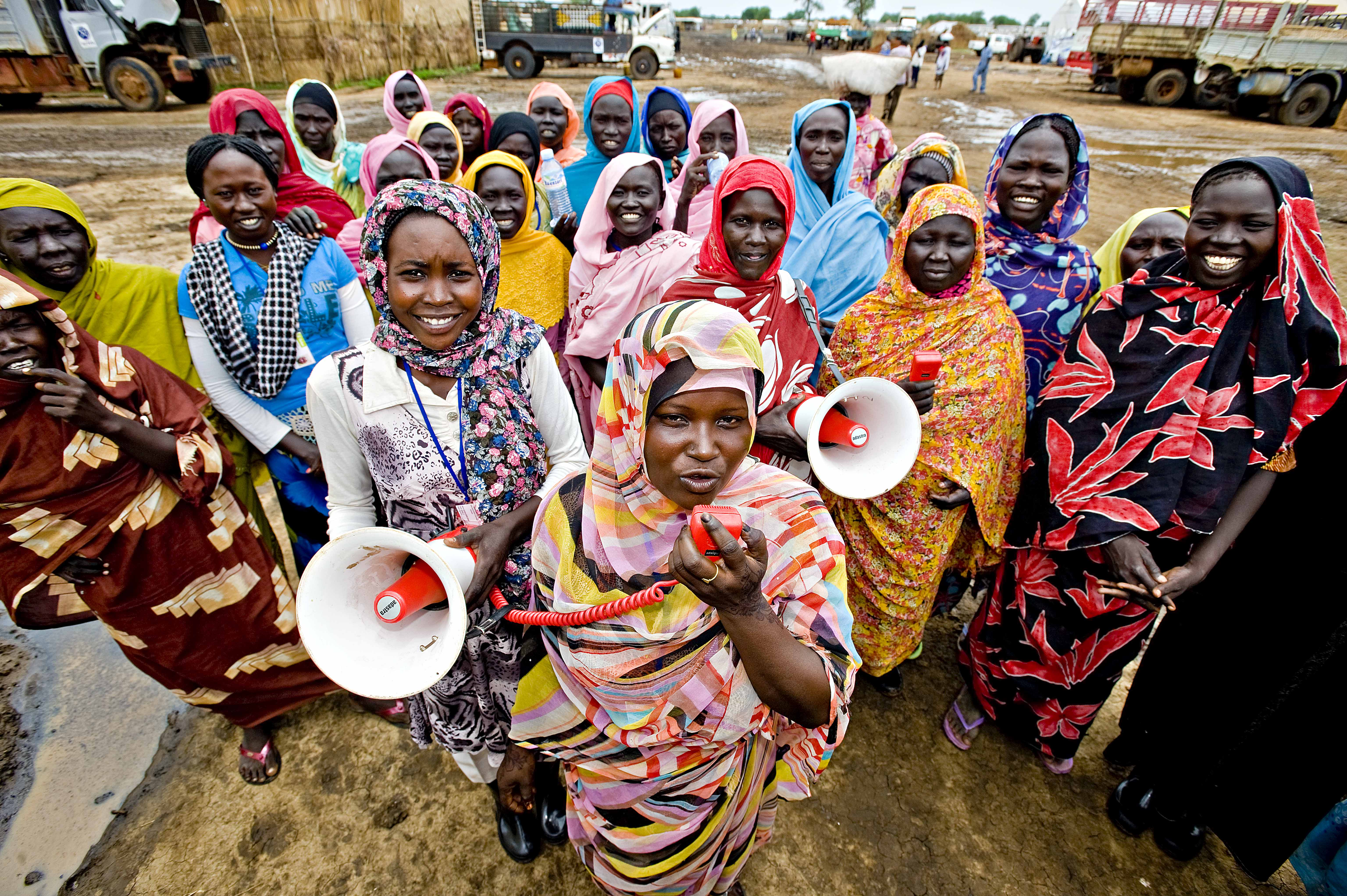
Application in race - "the right to be heard"

Gloria Ladson-Billings believes that "stories provide the necessary context for understanding, feeling, and interpreting" the voices of people of color who are muted within the dominant culture. Critical race theorists try to bring the marginalized group's viewpoint to the forefront through an encouragement of "naming one's own reality." Delgado addresses three reasons for "naming one's own reality" in legal discourse: "1) much of 'reality' is socially constructed; 2) stories provide members of outgroups a vehicle for psychic self-preservation; and 3) the exchange of stories from teller to listener can help overcome ethnocentrism and the dysconscious drive or need to view the world in one way."

In traditional pedagogical practices in the United States' educational institutions, critical race theorists argue that the official school curriculum is designed to maintain a "White supremacist master script." As Swartz contends, master scripting sets the standard knowledge for students, which legitimizes "dominant, white, upper-class, male voices" and mutes people of color's perspectives.

When pedagogies involve the Latinx community, they are often framed by a "public and institutional rhetoric of cultural deficiency", further discouraging Latinx students from sharing their cultural experiences. The muted group theory displays how others interpret marginalized groups and can silence Hispanic immigrants.

The voices from other non-dominant groups are tampered, mastered and can only be heard through reshaping and translation to meet the dominant standard. Therefore, Lasdon-Billing argues that the curriculum should be race-neutral or colorblind, present people of color, and "presume a homogenized 'we' in a celebration of diversity."

=== Age ===
Ageism leads to more mature age groups being muted in American society. In particular, the elderly are ignored and marginalized.

In "Muted lives: Older battered women", Carol Seaver discusses how sexist and ageist factors mute older women. She argues that this group of domestic abuse survivors faces a specific set of difficulties including being "silenced by ageist assumptions about them as too resistant and hopeless to change or made invisible by the notion that very frail elders are the only victims of elder abuse." In "Muted groups in health communication policy and practice: The case of older adults in rural and frontier areas", Deborah Ballard-Reisch examines how and why elderly populations in the rural areas of Nevada and Kansas are considered muted health communication groups. Ageism intertwines with other muted elements that contribute to the loss of autonomy for the elderly.

According to Seaver and Ballard-Reisch's works, stereotypes can mute aging populations, such as the idea that the elderly are resistant to change.

Ageism also intersects with heterosexism when examining how aging LGBT community members are muted. Scholar Maria T. Brown writes, "The exclusion of lesbian, gay, bisexual, and transgender (LGBT) elders from queer and gerontological theories has resulted in the silencing of LGBT older adults and their experiences." Brown claims that the silencing is a "rhetorical move" that excludes the elderly from queer theory and queerness from the field gerontology. Her case study is an example of how elderly and queer identities intersect in muted group theory.

In popular culture, ageism persists. Calasanti stated that seniors receive an influx of unsolicited brochures and spam in their email inboxes that market methods to stop aging. The growing "anti-aging industry" sells the luxurious elderly woman as a model for womanhood. In turn, this strategic practice mutes older women who attempt to speak out about the money-grabbing tactic.

=== Disability ===
Marcel Calvez argues that, "What makes a social group muted is that claims of its members to participate into social life are discounted and that they have internalised the idea that they are not entitled to raise their voice." By this logic, he says that those with intellectual disabilities are muted. Calvez's study examines the experiences of those with intellectual disabilities, with special attention to the fact these groups are often marginalized and silenced.

Differences in social classes also can contribute to diversified school experiences for students with disabilities. Woodcock and Hitches state that increased stigmatization toward disadvantaged students' academic performances can be stereotyped as a result of their health condition rather than "an outcome of multiple marginalized identities".

Many disabled groups are silenced by the dominant abled group that knowingly or unknowingly exclude them. The means of muting, ridicule, ritual, control, and harassment can all apply to disabled groups. Ableist language, such as use of the pejorative term "retard," can be used to ridicule disabled groups. However, disabled groups and abled allies can raise awareness about pejoratives' harm in their communities.

== Extension ==
Although the muted group theory has been mainly developed as a feminist theory, it can also be applied to other silenced groups in society.

=== Mark Orbe's perspective ===
Mark Orbe, a communication theorist, has suggested that in the U.S. the dominant group consists of white, heterosexual, middle-class, males. Thus, groups that distinguish themselves from the dominant one in terms of race, age, gender, sexual orientation, and economic status can potentially be silenced or muted.

==== Interethnic communication ====
In "African-American communication research: Toward a deeper understanding of interethnic communication" (1995) and "Constructing co-cultural theory: An explication of culture, power, and communication" (1998), Orbe fleshed out two important extensions of muted group theory:

- Muting can be applied to many cultural groups. Orbe stated that research performed by the dominant white European culture has created a view of African-American communication "which promotes the illusion that all African-Americans, regardless of gender, age, class, or sexual orientation, communicate in a similar manner".
- There are several ways in which members of a muted group can face their position within the dominant culture. Orbe identified 26 different ways that members of muted groups face the structures and messages imposed by dominant groups. For example, individuals can choose to (1) emphasize commonalities and downplay cultural differences, (2) educate others about norms of the muted group, and (3) avoid members of the dominant group. Orbe also suggests that individuals choose one of the 26 different ways based on previous experiences, context, abilities, perceived costs and rewards.

A muted group theory framework exists within any society that includes asymmetrical power relationships. Kramarae's research on women and Orbe's work on African American men utilize this framework to dissect the communicative experiences of non dominant, or co-cultural, group members. Although Kramarae focuses on women's muted voices, she also opens the door to the application of muted group theory to issues beyond gender differences. Orbe not only applies this theoretical framework to a different muted group, i.e. African-Americans, but also contributes by assessing "how individual and small collectives work together to negotiate their muted group status".

==== Co-cultural communication ====
Orbe regards "interactions among underrepresented and dominant group members" as co-cultural communication. He argues that there are three preferred outcomes in the co-cultural communication process: assimilation (e.g., becoming integrated into mainstream culture), accommodation (gaining acceptance and space in a society and achieving cultural pluralism without hierarchy), or separation (maintaining a culturally distinct identity in intercultural interactions)". He also notes three communication approaches: nonassertive (when individuals are constrained and nonconfrontational, putting the needs of others first to avoid conflicts), assertive (when individuals express feelings, ideas, and rights in ways that consider the needs of themselves and others), or aggressive (when individuals express feelings, ideas, and rights in ways that ignore the needs of others). The different combinations of the three preferred outcomes and three communication approaches result in nine communication orientations.

Further, although various groups can be considered as muted within society, silenced and dominant groups can also exist within any group. For example, Anita Taylor and M. J. Hardman posit that feminist movements can also present dominant subgroups that mute other groups within the same movement. Thus, members within oppressed groups can have diverse opinions and one can become dominant and further mute the others.

=== Radhika Chopra's perspective ===
Most researchers would consider men as the dominant group in MGT. However, scholars like Radhika Chopra asserted that men can also be part of a muted group when considering the nurturing fathers issue. Chopra pointed out that some discourse of mothering devalued father's presence as "an absence, in contrast with the hands-on vital involvement of the mother". According to Chopra's opinion, in the early American colonial period, fathers were quite involved in the nurturance of kids. Therefore, the sex and gender distinction should be taken into consideration when we talk about MGT. He argued that sex is a biological category where people are placed into male and female, whereas gender is more like a social category based on people's behaviors and identity of masculinity and femininity.

In Chopra's "Invisible Men: Masculinity, Sexuality, and Male Domestic Labor", he discusses his concept of "gendering the veil" where Sirisha Indukuri male domestic workers must be perceived as a system that frames bodily styles, speech forms and the nonverbal language of gestures. He argues that men who are in the domestic labor system should not be muted based on their worksite.

"Employers congratulate themselves on servants who have successfully learned their place and only then extend to them the 'right' to be part of the family’s ritual calendar, though a worker's participation is initiated by the employer, not the worker. The move toward being part of the family depends on learning the rules of exclusion, permission, and prohibition."

== Critiques ==
Edwin Ardener perceived that muted group theory had pragmatic and analytical potentials. Ardener constantly stated that muted group theory consisted of both women and men's lived experiences in his social anthropological studies. He drew on his personal experience as a "sensitive boy" in an all-boys London secondary school. His constrained voice in a classroom with dominant young speakers paved way for the development of muted group theory.

A prominent criticism of muted group theory is that it assumes all men or women are essentially same in their own groups. The difference is between men and women, not among men or women. Therefore, both groups are misunderstood to some extent.

Deborah Tannen, the theorist that created Genderlect Theory, criticizes feminist scholars like Kramarae for assuming that men are trying to control women. Tannen acknowledges that differences in male and female communication styles sometimes lead to imbalances of power. She added that "bad feelings and imputation of bad motives or bad character can come about when there was no intention to dominate or to wield power". Kramerae believes that men belittle and ignore women whenever they speak out against being muted. Both theorists believe muting is involved, but they see it from different standpoints.

Carol Gilligan presented another reason concerning why women and men perceive "reality" differently. She posited that, instead of men presumably being the dominant sources of languages and voices, it is because women and men have different means of formulating their sense of "self". According to Gilligan, women's moral domain is more care-based, which means women perceive the reality based on the relations with others, whereas men forge their identity through separation, focusing on self-assessment and individual achievement. These two approaches eventually lead women and men to construct different understandings of integrity and different senses of reality.

== See also ==
- Spiral of silence
- Standpoint feminism
- Standpoint theory
- Groupthink
- Co-cultural communication theory
- Critical race theory
- Cultural studies
