= Nyongo society =

Community

The Nyongo Society is the name of a supposed group of witches believed to exist in Cameroon. The legends were first written about in the 1950s by British social anthropologist, Edwin Ardener, while describing what he called the Nyongo Terror in the present-day Southwest Province in Cameroon. Today the belief in this society can be found from the coast of Cameroon to the Bakossi and Beti peoples in the interior of the country. It is even found amongst the northern parts of the country with the Bamileke and Bamenda peoples.

== History ==
The term has been used by many tribes and factions in Cameroon. The term nyongo and the first legends can be attributed to the Douala peoples, who lived on the coast. Nyongo is derived from the word nyunga, which they used to describe a person who have captured a magical python, which manifests itself as a rainbow.

Around the time of the Second World War, the Bakweris believed that the society met at Mount Kupe to do their practices. Here the legend split into two different versions.

In one version, human sacrifice was practiced in order to "pay" debts to the N'yongo Society, or else taken to work for the N'yongos in a zombie-like state. It is this version that has persisted since the legend has been co-opted by the Wimbum, with the addition of cannibalistic rumors.

However, in the earlier Bakweris version, bodies were only made to look as though they were deceased. Dead rats would supposedly be placed underneath the person to permeate the body with the smell of death, ensuring a quick burial. After this, the witch, or those dealing with the N'yongo Society, would invisibly extract the person from the grave. This victim would then aid the perpetrator in amassing wealth. The Society also had their own community on Mount Kupe, which ran completely off of the victim's labor, and even had luxuries such as lorries.

As the myth spread, people began to say that you could identify a member by their tin roof. This led to a shortage of new housing, as nobody wanted to be linked with N'yongo by their association with modern housing. However, by the time cross-Atlantic trade had flooded the local villages with wealth, social unrest was beginning to form with a flurry of N'yongo accusations. The locals paid dearly for witch-hunter Obasi Njom to come to their villages and perform ju-ju to rid them of witches from the N'yongo Society.

As of the 1970s, the term was being used by the Wimbum evangelicals of Western Cameroon, who ascribed a new significance to those associated with the Nyongo Society. Rather than being confined to an area, or mountain, the Society was now thought to extend their influence nationally. It was now suspected that those who had come into wealth quickly had a close association with the group. These suspicions become heightened if a somebody in their family dies soon. However even then, there are those who insist the subject has made a pact with the Society, and that deaths will follow. When those under suspicion who have recently acquired wealth die themselves, it is said they did not pay the Society when asked.

Another variance of the myth states that in order to select an offering to the society, all the person needs to do is establish a link between themselves and another. For this reason, especially in the late 70s, there were reports of children being told to refrain from picking up coins, as they may have been dropped by nyongo practitioners in order to snare a new victim.

In 1992, when a road accident killed multiple schoolchildren, the headmaster had to be removed from the area as local people insisted that he had given the children to the head of the Nyongo Society. The myths have also impacted those who are attempting to start businesses. If locals think that the initial money invested in the business was given by the Society, nobody will buy the store's goods.

When somebody who is believed to be a member of the N'yongo Society dies, they may be decapitated, or buried face down, in order to prevent them rising as an ekongi.
