= Centre for Cross-Cultural Research on Women =

Research centre based in England

The Centre for Cross-Cultural Research on Women (CCCRW) was established to advance research on women internationally. Prior to the centre being officially created seminars were started in 1972 by academic women (mainly anthropologists) presenting research on women and in particular the universal inferior status of women. This was at the time when the feminist movement was active and the seminars attracted large audiences in what was still male dominated Oxford. It was felt that anthropologists were not looking at research questions such as the place and role of women in society as well as the feminist issues raised from those questions. The centre gave opportunity and space for women researchers to present their findings in public. These seminars have continued weekly every term since 1972 as detailed below. From presenting early papers at the Centre many of the participants have gone onto senior posts in academia and beyond. The founding Director of CCCRW was Shirley Ardener.

In 1983 the CCCRW was formally established at Queen Elizabeth House, the University of Oxford’s International Development Centre. QEH had been the venue for most of the seminars from 1972. Members felt that a public event should mark the beginning of the newly formed Centre and in 1984 the first Commemorative Lecture in celebration of pioneering women anthropologists was given. This was in honour of Phyllis Kaberry with two other women anthropologists, Barbara Ward and Audrey Richards, also being commemorated. Details of the lectures from 1984 are given below.

Visiting Fellows formed an important part of the Centre’s programme since its inception. Fellows had their own research plans and follow individualised research or study programmes, with appointed facilitators according to their research needs. They attended seminars, lectures and workshops, and these provide useful opportunities for cross-cultural exchange of research ideas. Fellows were fully integrated into the social activities of the Centre and QEH more generally. They visited the Centre for up to one academic year or for as little as a month, depending on available funding and research time. Issues researched broadly concern with gender, culture and development. The Centre has had over 100 Visiting Fellows.

Also included in its activities are workshops and conferences, which resulted in many publications (there was a monograph series first with Berg then Berghahn Books). The topics discussed in seminars since its beginning is very varied with relevance to everyday life in many countries and cultures.

In 2002 the name was changed to the International Gender Studies Centre. The IGS website summarises much of this history but never mentions the former name.

In July 2011, IGS/CCCRW ended its long association with Queen Elizabeth House and moved to Lady Margaret Hall (LMH). It closed in October 2019.
