= Cheris Kramarae =

American feminist scholar

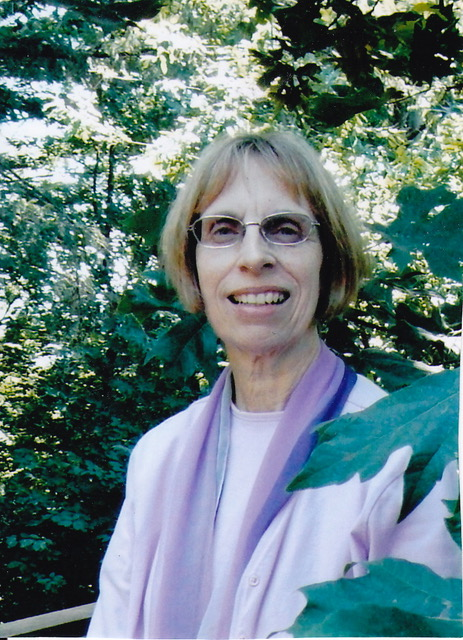
- Dr. Cheris Kramarae
- Known for: Muted group theory

Academic background
- Education: South Dakota State University (BS); Ohio University (MA); University of Illinois (PhD)

Academic work
- Discipline: Women's studies, speech communication
- Notable works: A Feminist Dictionary

Cheris Kramarae (previously known as Cheris Kramer) is a scholar in the area of women's studies and communication, with her research primarily focusing on gender, language and communication, technology, and education. She is mostly known for her contributions to muted group theory, as well as A Feminist Dictionary, in which she was a co-author.

== Early life and education ==
Kramarae received a B.S. from South Dakota State University in 1959, an M.A. from Ohio University and, in 1975, a Ph.D. in communication and social linguistics from University of Illinois, Urbana-Champaign.

== Teaching career ==
Upon completing her doctorate, Kramarae accepted a position in 1978 at the University of Illinois Urbana as an associate professor, teaching speech communication through 1985. In 1988, she moved on to the University of Oregon, where she was the acting director for the Center for the Study of Women in Society.

From 1991 to 1996, Kramarae was at the University of Illinois, where she was the co-founder and co-organizer of the Women, Information Technology & Scholarship (WITS) Center for Advanced Study. She was also the director of the Women's Studies program at the University of Illinois, beginning in 1993, as well as Jubilee Professor or Liberal Arts & Social Sciences at the University of Illinois.

Kramarae is currently a visiting professor for the Center for the Study of Women in Society at the University of Oregon. She also worked as dean at the International Women's University in Germany.

== Research ==
Kramarae's research has been primarily focused on gender, language, communication, technology, and education. Her research focuses on taking a look at women experience in higher education. With her research, she has published many books and articles on the concepts of women communication via technology, and how that can differ between genders. Kramarae is mostly known though, for her contributions to muted group theory, as well as A Feminist Dictionary.

=== Muted group theory ===
Kramarae is most widely known for her contributions to muted group theory (MGT). This theory looks at power and how different groups use it. This theory begins with the premise that language is culture-based, and since men are seen to have more power than women, men have been seen to have power over language, resulting with a male-biased language. MGT breaks down into three assumptions:

- Men and women perceive the world differently because they have different perception shaping experiences.
- Men enact their power politically, using their power to suppress women's ideas from gaining public awareness.
- Women must then convert their voices into language that is considered male.

Upon this definition of MGT, Kramarae made the widely accepted claim that language is a tool made by men and used by a dominant culture to marginalize other groups and to deter them from full participation in their given societies.

=== A Feminist Dictionary ===
Kramarae is also well known for co-authoring A Feminist Dictionary, citing the need to challenge the idea that "men seemed to have the monopoly on the supposedly one true view of the world".

== Activism ==
In 1977, Kramarae became an associate of the Women's Institute for Freedom of the Press (WIFP).

== Selected publications ==
- Henly, N. M., Kramarae, C., & Thorne, B. (1983). Language, gender, and society. New York, NY: Newbury House Publishers
- Kramarae, C. (1980). Women and men speaking. New York, NY: Newbury House Publishers
- Kramarae, C., Russo, A., & Treichler, P. (1985) A feminist dictionary. London, UK: Rivers Oram Press
- Kramarae, C. (1988). Technology and women's voices. Abingdon, UK: Taylor & Francis
- Kramarae, C., Russo, A., & Treichler, P. (1992) Amazons, bluestockings, and crones: A woman's companion to word's and ideas. Abingdon, UK: Routledge
- Kramarae, C. (2000). Routledge international encyclopedia of women: Global women's issues and knowledge. Abingdon, UK: Routledge
- Kramarae, C. (2001). The third shift: Women learning online. Washington, DC: American Association of University Women Educational Foundation

== See also ==
- Feminism
- Women's studies
