= Shirley Ardener =

British anthropologist; women's studies academic

Shirley G. Ardener (born 1 April 1926) is a pioneer of research on women (doing women’s studies more-or-less avant la lettre) and a committed anthropological researcher working with Bakweri people in Cameroon since the 1950s, initially with her husband Edwin Ardener (1927–1987).

== Career ==
In 1964, she published an important analysis of forms of credit (Rotating credit associations) that has been influential on subsequent work on the informal economy and microcredit systems: see Rotating savings and credit association. Her work as editor has seen the publication of many key texts such as Perceiving Women, 1975. This collection also includes her essay Sexual Insult and Female Militancy, a foundational text demonstrating how the personal can be made deeply political.

She helped found and was the founding director of the Centre for Cross-Cultural Research on Women (CCCRW) at Queen Elizabeth House, Oxford informally since 1973, formally since 1983 (Davies and Waldren 2007: 252). The CCCRW later became the International Gender Studies Centre (IGS) based at Lady Margaret Hall, Oxford.

She was the minute taker at the meeting that Dag Hammarskjöld had in Cameroon in the run up to independence in Cameroon on 2 January 1959.

== Awards and honours ==
Ardener won the Welcome Medal for Anthropology in 1962. She was awarded the OBE in 1991. (Note: Other dates have been given: Davies and Waldren 2007:257 say 1989, Swaisland 2007: 272 gives 1990). The 1991 date seems definitive. See also 1991_Birthday_Honours.)

== Selected publications ==
- Perceiving Women (editor and contributor), Berg Publications, 1975
- Defining Females (editor and contributor), Berg, 1978
- Women and Space; ground rules and social maps (editor and contributor), Berg, 1981
- The Incorporated Wife (co-editor and contributor) Berg, 1984
- Visibility and Power, Essays on Women in Society and Development (co-editor, and contributor) OUP India, 1986
- Persons and Powers of Women (ed. and contributor), Berg, 1992
- Women and Missions, co-editor, Berg, 1993
- Bilingual Women, co-editor, Berg, 1994
- Money-Go-Rounds; women's use of rotating savings and credit associations (co-editor and contributor), 1995
- Kingdom on Mount Cameroon (annotated edition of papers by Edwin Ardener) Berghahn Books, 1996
- Swedish Ventures in Cameroon; trade and travel; people and politics, 1883-1923, annotated edition of Knutson's memoirs. Berghahn Books, 2002
- Changing Sex and Bending Gender (co-editor, and contributor) Berghahn Books, 2005
- Professional Identities; Policy and Practice in Business and Bureaucracy (co-editor) Berghahn Books, 2007
- War and Women Across Continents (co-editor and contributor), Berghahn Books 2016
