= Edwin Ardener =

British social anthropologist and academic (1927–1987)

- Born: 21 September 1927; England
- Died: 4 July 1987 (aged 59)
- Education: London School of Economics
- Known for: "Muted Group Theory", Ethnographic research in Cameroon, Study of Nyongo witchcraft
- Spouse: Shirley Ardener
- Scientific career
- Fields: Social Anthropology, History
- Workplaces: London School of Economics, University of Oxford
- Doctoral advisor: E. E. Evans-Pritchard

Edwin Ardener (21 September 1927 – 4 July 1987) was a British social anthropologist and academic. He was also noted for his contributions to the study of history. Within anthropology, some of his most important contributions were to the study of gender, as in his 1975 work in which he described women as "muted" in social discourse.

A graduate of the LSE, Ardener took up an Oxford lectureship in social anthropology at the invitation of E. E. Evans-Pritchard. His ethnographic research concentrated on Africa, particularly on Cameroon. His history of the Bakweri of Cameroon in the nineteenth century is regarded as definitive. In his works about Cameroon, he also wrote about a form of witchcraft in Cameroon known as Nyongo.

One of his best-known contributions to anthropology came in the 1975 article " 'The Problem' revisited", in Perceiving Women, a volume edited by his wife and fellow anthropologist Shirley Ardener. In this essay he advanced the theory that women have been a muted group, comparatively unheard in social discourse, whose relative silence might also be seen as a function of the dominant group's deafness to them. He identified a problematic tendency in anthropological methodology to talk only to men and about women, thereby ignoring at least half the sample of people they were supposed to be observing. Ardener diagnosed the problem as a result of the fact that ethnographic methods were both devised and verified by male anthropologists, who did not realise what they were overlooking.
