= A Feminist Dictionary =

1985 reference book

- Author: Cheris Kramarae, Paula A. Treichler, Ann Russo
- Language: English
- Genre: Feminist theory
- Publisher: Pandora Press
- Publication date: January 1, 1985
- Pages: 587 pages
- ISBN: 978-0863580604
- Text: A Feminist Dictionary online

A Feminist Dictionary is an alternative dictionary written by Cheris Kramarae and Paula A. Treichler, with assistance from Ann Russo, originally published by Pandora Press in 1985.

A revised second edition of the text was published in 1992, under the title Amazons, Bluestockings, and Crones: A Feminist Dictionary. The dictionary contains over 2500 words and definitions from a feminist perspective and, in the words of reviewer Patricia Nichols, forces the reader "to consider who assembles the dictionaries usually consulted and to ask how the words have been chosen."

A Feminist Dictionary does not adhere to lexicographical convention: rather than offering readers objective descriptions for each entry, it uses the dictionary format to wryly comment upon and critique gender dynamics. Nichols describes the resulting volume as a "sort of a cross between the OED and the Whole Earth Catalog". In a discussion of the pedagogical uses of A Feminist Dictionary in the literature classroom, scholars Barbara DiBernard and Sheila Reiter add on the work's origins:

The same social conditions that necessitate college programs called “Women’s Studies,” bizarrely categorized as nontraditional, inspired its editors, Cheris Kramarae and Paula Treichler, to compile A Feminist Dictionary, originally published in 1985.

== Commentary ==
In "Gender, Language, and Discourse: A Review Essay", linguist Deborah Cameron claims that men and women use language differently. However, according to Cameron, it is not enough to simply acknowledge how men and women differ in their use of language. Instead, when raising concerns about language we should look at how language is interpreted or used.

The Dictionary has been used by scholars to address gaps in a variety of academic spheres including history, politics, economics, cultural studies, sexuality, and anatomy. Professors Ilya Parkins and Eva C. Karpinski involve its definition of "invisibility" in the "Introduction" to their work In/Visibility: Absences/Presence in Feminist Theory. For example, the Feminist Dictionary has been used to develop research in medical practice, film studies, and experimental design ethics.

In an analysis of several feminist dictionaries published between 1970 and 2006, the scholar Lindsay Rose Russell argues that the first and second editions of A Feminist Dictionary differ from each other in a way that reflects the shortcomings of feminist dictionary making on the whole:

"The fate of A Feminist Dictionary, originally published in 1985, and reissued in 1992, as Amazons, Bluestockings and Crones, is, I think, telling of how the radical revolution proposed by feminist English language lexicography was (and is) tamed: as A Feminist Dictionary, the text threatens a theoretical frame (feminist) with which to supplant both the theoretical principles of lexicography and the kinds of dictionaries such principles have traditionally produced, but as Amazons, Bluestockings and Crones, the text becomes rather more like a harmless helpmate to the lexicographical tradition, a specialized dictionary of boutique terms (Amazon, bluestocking, crone) that dress up (or down) other more sober and conventional tomes. In this move from suffragist to supplement, feminist dictionaries have lost not only their revolutionary theoretical sophistication but also their potential to act as a usable past by which we can better understand the history of and imagine a future for the dictionary genre."

== See also ==
- Muted group theory
- Testosterone poisoning
