= List of constructed languages =

The following list of notable constructed languages is divided into auxiliary, ritual, engineered, and artistic (including fictional) languages, and their respective subgenres. All entries on this list have further information on separate Wikipedia articles.

== Auxiliary languages ==
=== International auxiliary languages ===
International auxiliary languages (IAL) are languages constructed to provide easy, fast, and/or improved communication among all human beings, or a significant portion, without necessarily replacing native languages.

Name	ISO	Origin	Creator	Description
Solresol		1827	François Sudre	Based on pitch levels sounded with their solfege syllables (a "musical language") although no knowledge of music is required to learn it.
Communicationssprache		1839	Joseph Schipfer	Based on French.
Universalglot		1868	Jean Pirro	An early a posteriori language, predating even Volapük.
Volapük	vo, vol	1879–1880	Johann Martin Schleyer	First to generate international interest in IALs.
Esperanto	eo, epo	1887	L. L. Zamenhof	The most popular auxiliary language ever invented, including, possibly, up to two million speakers, the highest ever for a constructed language and the only one to date to have its own native speakers (approximately 1,000).
Idiom Neutral		1902	Waldemar Rosenberger	A naturalistic IAL by a former advocate of Volapük.
Latino sine Flexione	la-peano	1903	Giuseppe Peano	"Latin without inflection", it replaced Idiom Neutral in 1908.
Ro		1904	Rev. Edward Powell Foster	An a priori language using categories of knowledge.
Ido	io, ido	1907	A group of reformist Esperanto speakers	The most successful offspring of Esperanto.
Adjuvilo		1910	Claudius Colas	An Esperantido some believe was created to cause dissent among Idoists.
Timerio		1921	Tiemer	A language where each concept is replaced with a number, intended to be used as a means for automatic translation.
Interlingue	ie, ile	1922	Edgar de Wahl	A sophisticated naturalistic IAL, also known as Occidental.
Novial	nov	1928	Otto Jespersen	Another sophisticated naturalistic IAL by a famous Danish linguist.
Sona		1935	Kenneth Searight	Agglutinative language with universal vocabulary. Its 360 radicals can be combined to form new words.
Esperanto II		1937	René de Saussure	Last of linguist Saussure's many Esperantidos.
Mondial		1940s	Dr. Helge Heimer	Naturalistic European language.
Interglossa	igs	1943	Lancelot Hogben	It has a strong Greco-Latin vocabulary.
Interlingua	ia, ina	1951	International Auxiliary Language Association	A major effort to systematize the international scientific vocabulary. It aims to be immediately comprehensible by Romance language speakers and to some extent English speakers.
Intal		1956	Erich Weferling	An effort to unite the most common systems of constructed languages.
Lingua sistemfrater		1957	Pham Xuan Thai	Greco-Latin vocabulary with southeast Asian grammar.
Neo	neu	1961	Arturo Alfandari	A very terse Esperantido.
Babm		1962	Rikichi Okamoto	Notable for using Latin letters as a syllabary.
Arcaicam Esperantom	eo-arkaika	1969	Manuel Halvelik	'Archaic Esperanto', developed to produce an archaic effect in Esperanto literature.
Eurolengo		1972	Leslie Jones	Combines elements of English and Spanish.
Glosa		1975	Ronald Clark and Wendy Ashby	An evolution of Interglossa.
Kotava	avk	1978	Staren Fetcey	A sophisticated a priori IAL focused on cultural neutrality.
Uropi		1986	Joël Landais	Based on the common Indo-European roots and the common grammatical points of the IE languages.
Poliespo		1990s?	Billy Ray Waldon	Esperanto grammar with significant Cherokee vocabulary.
Romániço		1991	Anonymous	Vocabulary is derived from common Romance roots.
Europanto		1996	Diego Marani	A "linguistic jest" by a European diplomat.
Unish		1996	Language Research Institute, Sejong University	Vocabulary from fifteen representative languages.
Lingua Franca Nova	lfn	1998	C. George Boeree and others	Romance vocabulary with creole-like grammar.
Sambahsa-Mundialect		2007	Olivier Simon	Mixture of simplified Proto-Indo-European and other languages.
Lingwa de planeta		2010	Dmitri Ivanov	Worldlang based on Arabic, Chinese, English, French, German, Hindi, Persian, Portuguese, Russian, and Spanish.

=== Zonal auxiliary languages ===
Zonal auxiliary languages are languages created with the purpose of facilitating communication between speakers of a certain group of related languages. Unlike international auxiliary languages for global uses, they are intended to serve a limited linguistic or geographic area. Examples include Pan-Slavic languages, Pan-Romance languages and Pan-Germanic languages.

Name	ISO	Origin	Creator	Description
Ruski jezik		1666	Juraj Križanić	The first known example of an artificially created Pan-Slavic language.
Tutonish		1901	Elias Molee	The first Pan-Germanic language, later reformed under names like nu teutonish, alteutonik, etc.
Romanid		1956	Zoltán Magyar	A zonal auxiliary language based on the Romance languages.
Guosa		1965	Alexander Igbinéwéká	A zonal auxiliary language for West Africa derived primarily from Hausa, Yoruba, and Igbo.
Afrihili	afh	1970	K. A. Kumi Attobrah	A pan-African language.
Runyakitara		early 1990s		A standardized language based on four closely related languages of western Uganda.
Palawa kani		1992	Tasmanian Aboriginal Centre	Based on reconstructed vocabulary from the limited accounts of the various Tasmanian languages once spoken by the eastern Aboriginal Tasmanians.
Ortatürk / Öztürkçe		1992, 2008	Baxtiyar Kärimov, Shoahmad Mutalov	A Pan-Turkic zonal auxiliary language, with statistically calculated vocabulary.
Slovio		1999	Mark Hučko	A constructed language based on the Slavic languages and Esperanto grammar.
Romance Neolatino		2006	Jordi Cassany Bates and others	A Pan-Romance language
Slovianski		2006	Ondrej Rečnik, Gabriel Svoboda, Jan van Steenbergen, Igor Polyakov	A naturalistic language based on the Slavic languages.
Neoslavonic		2009	Vojtěch Merunka	A modernized form of Old Church Slavonic.
Budinos		2009	Aleksey Andreyevitch Arzamazov	A zonal auxiliary language based on the Finno-Ugric languages.
Interslavic	isv	2011–2017	Jan van Steenbergen, Vojtěch Merunka	A Pan-Slavic zonal auxiliary language, the result of the merger of Slovianski and Neoslavonic.

=== Controlled languages ===
Controlled natural languages are natural languages that have been altered to make them simpler, easier to use, or more acceptable in certain circumstances, such as for use by people who do not speak the original language well. The following projects are examples of controlled English:

Name	Origin	Creator	Comments
Basic English	1925	Charles Kay Ogden	Seek to limit the language to a given list of common-use words and terms in order to make it simpler to foreign learners or other people who may have difficulties.
Special (Learning) English	1959	Voice of America	Seek to limit the language to a given list of common-use words and terms in order to make it simpler to foreign learners or other people who may have difficulties.
Globish	2004	Jean-Paul Nerrière	Seek to limit the language to a given list of common-use words and terms in order to make it simpler to foreign learners or other people who may have difficulties.
E-Prime	1940s	D. David Bourland Jr.	Eliminates the verb to be with the intent of making writing more expressive and accurate.
Simplified Technical English	1983	European Association of Aerospace Industries	Seeks to largely reduce the complexity and ambiguity of technical texts such as manuals.
Plain English		Various	Proposes a more direct, short, clear language by avoiding many idioms, jargon and foreign words.

=== Visual languages ===
Visual languages use symbols or movements in place of the spoken word. Constructed sign languages also fall in this category.

Name	ISO	Origin	Creator	Comments
Isotype		1925–1934	Otto Neurath et al.	A pictographic language.
Blissymbols	zbl	1949	Charles K. Bliss	An ideographic writing system, with its own grammar and syntax.
International Sign	ils	1970s	Jasin Maloku	International auxiliary sign language. Also known as Gestuno.

== Ritual languages ==
These are languages in actual religious use by their communities or congregations.

Name	ISO	Origin	Creator	Comments
Iyaric		c. 1930s	Rastas	"Rasta Talk" "Dread Talk" Constructed in the Rastafari Movement to replace lost ancestral African languages.
Eskayan	esy	c. 1920–1940	Mariano Datahan	Grammatically based on the Boholano dialect of Cebuano.
Medefaidrin	dmf	1930s	Obɛri Ɔkaimɛ church	Used by this Nigerian Christian church
Damin		unknown	the Lardil people	Created by native speakers of Lardil; only click language outside Africa.

== Engineered languages ==
Engineered languages are devised to test a hypothesis or experiment with innovative linguistic features. They may fall into one or more of three categories: philosophical, experimental and logical.

Name	ISO	Origin	Creator	Description
Logopandecteision		1653	Sir Thomas Urquhart	Suggestions toward a taxonomic language of great complexity.
Real Character		1668	John Wilkins	Detailed suggestions for a symbolic language capable of philosophical precision.
Loglan		1955	James Cooke Brown	Created to test the Sapir–Whorf hypothesis; the inspiration for Lojban.
aUI		1962	W. John Weilgart	Each phoneme is also a morpheme and a sememe, so that a single word can express a complex idea.
Ithkuil		1978–2023	John Quijada	Complex language designed to express deeper meanings briefly and clearly.
Láadan	ldn	1982	Suzette Haden Elgin	A tonal language oriented towards women; created to test if natural languages are biased towards men.
Lojban	jbo	1987	Logical Language Group	Logical and syntactically unambiguous language; successor of Loglan.
Toki Pona	tok	2001	Sonja Lang	Minimalist language with 120–137+ words, with over 1600 speakers.
Kēlen		2009	Sylvia Sotomayor	An alien language that attempts to eliminate verbs, which would violate a universal feature among natural human languages.

=== Others ===
Name	Origin	Creator	Description
Lincos	1960	Hans Freudenthal	Designed to be understandable by any possible intelligent extraterrestrial life, for use in interstellar radio transmissions.
Attempto Controlled English	1995	University of Zurich	A controlled natural language that is also a knowledge representation language.
Mänti	2006	Daniel Tammet	An invented language that uses some Finnic words and grammar.

== Artistic/fictional languages ==
=== Languages mainly used in fiction ===
==== Constructed by J. R. R. Tolkien ====
Tolkien's most prominent languages are:

Language	ISO	Description
Sindarin	sjn	an Elvish language, largely inspired by Welsh.
Quenya	qya	an Elvish language, largely inspired by Finnish, Latin, and Ancient Greek.
Khuzdul		a Dwarvish language, largely inspired by the Semitic languages.

==== Film ====
Name	Work	Origin	Creator	Description
Klingon	Star Trek	1979–present	Marc Okrand	Language of the Klingon alien species.
Atlantean	Atlantis: The Lost Empire	2001	Marc Okrand	Language of the citizens of the mythical city of Atlantis.
Ku	The Interpreter	2005	Said el-Gheithy	Fictional African language.
Naʼvi	Avatar	2009	Paul Frommer	Spoken by the Naʼvi.
Barsoomian	John Carter	2012	Paul Frommer, Edgar Rice Burroughs	Language of the Martians.
Kiliki	Baahubali	2015	Madhan Karky	Spoken by the Kalakeyas.

==== Games ====
Name	Work	Origin	Creator	Description
Tsolyani	Empire of the Petal Throne	1940s	M. A. R. Barker	Language of the world of Tékumel as described in this roleplaying game.
Gargish	Ultima series	1981–2013		Language of the gargoyle race.
Wenja	Far Cry Primal	2016	Andrew Byrd, Brenna Byrd	Three dialects (Wenja, Udam, Izila) used in all dialogs and by NPCs. Engineered as an archaic version of PIE.

==== Internet-based ====
Name	Origin	Creator	Description
Teonaht	1962	Sally Caves	Language of the Teonim, a race of polydactyl humans who have a cultural history of worshiping catlike deities.
Verdurian and others	1995	Mark Rosenfelder	Spoken in the country Verduria of planet Almea.
Dritok	2007	Don Boozer	Spoken by the Drushek, a large-eared, long-tailed race without vocal cords that lives in the continent Kryslan.

==== Music ====
Name	Origin	Creator	Description
Kobaïan	1970s	Christian Vander	Used by French rock group Magma.
Loxian	2005	Roma Ryan	Used on Enya's 2005 album Amarantine and 2015 album Dark Sky Island.
Moss	2009	Jackson Moore	A language with a musical phonology, modeled on pidgins.

==== Television ====
Name	Work	Origin	Creator	Description
Vulcan	Star Trek: The Original Series	1966–1969		Further developed by fans as Golic Vulcan.
Enchanta	Encantadia and Etheria television series	2005	Suzette Doctolero	Spoken by the denizens of Encantadia, known as Encantado(s)/Encantada(s) or Diwata (fairies).
The Valyrian languages and Dothraki	Game of Thrones	2011–2019	David J. Peterson	
Belter Creole	The Expanse	2014	Nick Farmer	Spoken by Belters, inhabitants of the asteroid belt and outer planets of the Solar System.
Romulan	Star Trek: Picard	2019	Trent Pehrson	

==== Other literature ====
Name	Work	Origin	Creator	Description
Utopian	Utopia	1516	Thomas More, Pieter Gillis	Constructed language created for the residents of More's fictional nation of Utopia; one of the first attempts at a constructed language.
Zaum		1913	Velimir Khlebnikov, Aleksei Kruchonykh et al.	Poetic tongue elaborated by these Russian Futurists as a "transrational" and "most universal" language "of songs, incantations, and curses."
Syldavian	The Adventures of Tintin, mostly in King Ottokar's Sceptre	1938–39	Hergé	Fictional West Germanic language of Syldavia, a Balkan kingdom.
Bordurian	The Adventures of Tintin, mostly in The Calculus Affair	1954–56	Hergé	Language of Borduria, a country bordering Syldavia.
Spocanian		1962	Rolandt Tweehuysen	Language of Spocania.
Nadsat	A Clockwork Orange	1962	Anthony Burgess	Teenage gang argot in Britain.
Chakobsa	Dune	1965	Frank Herbert, David J. Peterson, Jessie Peterson	Spoken by the Fremen.
Lapine	Watership Down	1972	Richard Adams	Spoken by rabbits.
Láadan (ldn)	Native Tongue and sequels	1984	Suzette Haden Elgin	Spoken by women.

=== Alternative languages ===
Some experimental languages were developed to observe hypotheses of alternative linguistic interactions which could have led to very different modern languages. The following two examples were created for Ill Bethisad, an alternate history project.

Name	ISO	Origin	Creator	Description
Brithenig	bzt	1996	Andrew Smith	A Romance language that replaced native Celtic languages in Great Britain instead of the Germanic Anglo-Saxon. A scenario where British Latin survived and developed further into a modern language.
Wenedyk (Venedic)		2002	Jan van Steenbergen	Polish as a Romance language. A language with Polish phonetics and orthography but with Romance instead of Slavic vocabulary.

=== Micronational languages ===
Name	ISO	Origin	Creator	Description
Talossan	tzl	1980	R. Ben Madison	Used for the Talossa micronation
Flandriaans		2024		Used for the Grand Duchy of Flandrensis micronation. The language is based on West Germanic languages, mainly on Dutch and English.

=== Personal languages ===
Name	ISO	Origin	Creator	Description
Lingua ignota		12th century	Hildegard of Bingen	Latin-influenced mystical language.
Balaibalan	zba	c. 14th to 16th century	Muhyî-i Gülşenî	Language with mostly a priori vocabulary and written in Arabic script; influenced by Persian, Turkish and Arabic.
Enochian		late 16th century	John Dee, Edward Kelley	Purported Angelic language, possibly used in magic and occultism.
Vendergood		early 20th century	William James Sidis	Based mainly on Latin and Greek, with influence from German, English and Romance languages. Contains eight moods, including Sidis's own strongeable, and has a base twelve number system.

== Constructed languages in Wikipedia ==
There is a version of Wikipedia in each of the following eleven constructed languages. Eight of these languages are IALs (international auxiliary languages), Lojban and Toki Pona are engineered languages, and Interslavic is a zonal auxiliary language. Until 2005, there were also versions of Wikipedia in the constructed languages Toki Pona and Klingon, but these have been deleted. Toki Pona Wiki project continued independently under the name "Wikipesija", and re-opened in 2025.

Constructed languages in Wikipedia
Name	ISO/Link	Origin	Users worldwide	Active editors	Articles
Volapük	vo	1880	?	38	56,963
Esperanto	eo	1887	100,000 – 2,000,000	363	389,863
Ido	io	1907	c. 1000	56	64,992
Interlingue	ie	1922	?	28	13,811
Novial	nov	1928	?	8	2,069
Interlingua	ia	1951	c. 1000	49	30,397
Kotava	avk	1978	?	18	29,905
Lojban	jbo	1987	?	23	1,365
Lingua Franca Nova	lfn	1998	?	22	4,690
Toki Pona	tok	2001	?	75	4,714
Interslavic	isv	2011–2017	7,000 – 20,000	29	1,774

== See also ==
- Conlanger
- Constructed script
- Language game
- List of languages
