= Gajewski =

Gajewski (feminine: Gajewska; plural: Gajewscy) is a Polish surname. It is related to the following surnames:

Language	Masculine	Feminine
Polish	Gajewski	Gajewska
Belarusian (Romanization)	Гаеўскі (Hayeuski, Hajeŭski)	Гаеўская (Hayeuskaya, Hajeŭskaja)
Czech	Hájevský	Hájevská
Latvian	Gajevskis	
Lithuanian	Gajauskas	Gajauskienė (married); Gajauskaitė (unmarried)
Russian (Romanization)	Гаевский (Gayevskiy, Gayevsky)	Гаевская (Gayevskaya)
Ukrainian (Romanization)	Гаєвський (Hayevskyi, Hayevskyy)	Гаєвська (Hayevska)

== People ==
=== Gajewski, Gajewska ===
- Aleksandra Gajewska (born 1971), Polish theatre director, actress, and politician
- Aleksandra Gajewska (born 1989), Polish politician
- Andrzej Gajewski (born 1964), Polish canoer
- Boleslas Gajewski (active 1902), French artificial grammarian
- Fritz Gajewski (1885–1965), German businessman
- Grzegorz Gajewski (born 1985), Polish chess player
- Joanna Majdan-Gajewska (born 1988), Polish chess player
- Karolina Gajewska (born 1972), Polish politician
- Kenny Gajewski (born 1971), American baseball player
- Małgorzata Gajewska (born 1962), Polish field hockey player
- Natasha Gajewski, American businesswoman
- Piotr Gajewski (born 1959), Polish conductor
- Ryszard Gajewski (born 1954), Polish mountaineer
- Wacław Gajewski (1911–1997), Polish geneticist

=== Gayevsky ===
- Valery Gayevsky (born 1958), Russian politician
