= Captive Pursuit =

- Star Trek: Deep Space Nine episode
- Episode no.: Season 1 Episode 6
- Directed by: Corey Allen
- Story by: Jill Sherman Donner
- Teleplay by: Jill Sherman Donner; Michael Piller
- Production code: 406
- Original air date: February 1, 1993

Guest appearances
- Scott MacDonald as Tosk; Gerrit Graham as The Hunter; Kelly Curtis as Miss Sarda

Episode chronology
← Previous "Babel"	Next → "Q-Less"
- Star Trek: Deep Space Nine season 1

"Captive Pursuit" is the sixth episode of the first season of the American science fiction television series Star Trek: Deep Space Nine. The episode was written by executive producer Michael Piller and Jill Sherman Donner and was directed by Corey Allen.

Set in the 24th century, the series follows the adventures on Deep Space Nine, a space station located near a stable wormhole between the Alpha and Gamma quadrants of the Milky Way Galaxy, near the planet Bajor, as the Bajorans recover from a brutal decades-long occupation by the imperialistic Cardassians. In this episode, a creature called Tosk (Scott MacDonald) arrives on the station from the Gamma Quadrant and befriends Chief Miles O'Brien (Colm Meaney), who tries to help him escape the Hunter (Gerrit Graham) who has pursued him through the wormhole.

Scott MacDonald would later appear in several further roles in the franchise as well as a recurring character during season three of Star Trek: Enterprise. Graham, who appears in a guest role as the Hunter, had previously been considered for the main cast role of Odo. Michael Westmore designed the make-up for Tosk to resemble an alligator; his initial design for the Hunters was changed for budgetary reasons. The episode was praised by the cast and crew and received a Nielsen rating of 12.9, placing it as one of the four most-watched episodes of the first season. Critical reception was mostly positive, with critics approving of Meaney and MacDonald's performances, but disliking the formulaic nature of the plot. The episode won an Emmy Award for best make-up for a series.

== Plot ==
A damaged, unidentified vessel from the Gamma Quadrant docks at Deep Space Nine for repairs. Its reptilian pilot, identified only as Tosk, is the first known life-form from the Gamma Quadrant to visit the station. Chief Miles O'Brien suspects Tosk is running from something due to evidence of weapons fire on his vessel. O'Brien befriends Tosk and tries to help him repair his ship. However, Tosk attempts to steal from a weapons locker and is put in a holding cell by Security Chief Odo (René Auberjonois).

Uniformed aliens arrive through the wormhole, beam onto DS9, and start a phaser battle with a team led by Commander Benjamin Sisko (Avery Brooks). The aliens fight their way into the brig where Tosk is being held. Sisko, O'Brien and Odo enter the room as one of the aliens (Gerrit Graham) expresses his disappointment at finding Tosk captured alive; Tosk, it transpires, is the alien Hunters' quarry. The Hunter commands Sisko to lower the forcefield and release Tosk, but Sisko refuses. They discuss the issue and the Hunter agrees to place the wormhole out of bounds for future hunts. As much as he detests this practice, Sisko believes that under the Prime Directive, the law forbidding interfering with alien cultures, he must release Tosk to the aliens.

After talking to the bartender Quark (Armin Shimerman), O'Brien realises that he can change the rules of the hunt before Tosk is taken away by the Hunters. He lies to Odo and convinces him to release Tosk into his care, claiming it is a Starfleet, not a Bajoran matter. O'Brien escorts the Hunter and Tosk to an airlock, but the Chief has it rigged to overload, knocking out the Hunter, allowing O'Brien to help Tosk escape. In Ops, Sisko is informed about the situation and tells Odo to pursue the duo at a leisurely pace, giving O'Brien time to help Tosk escape the station with the Hunters in pursuit. Later, an angry Sisko reprimands O'Brien for his actions; the Chief expresses his surprise at not being apprehended immediately by Odo. Sisko claims that he must have slipped up, and smiles wryly after O'Brien has left his office.

== Production ==
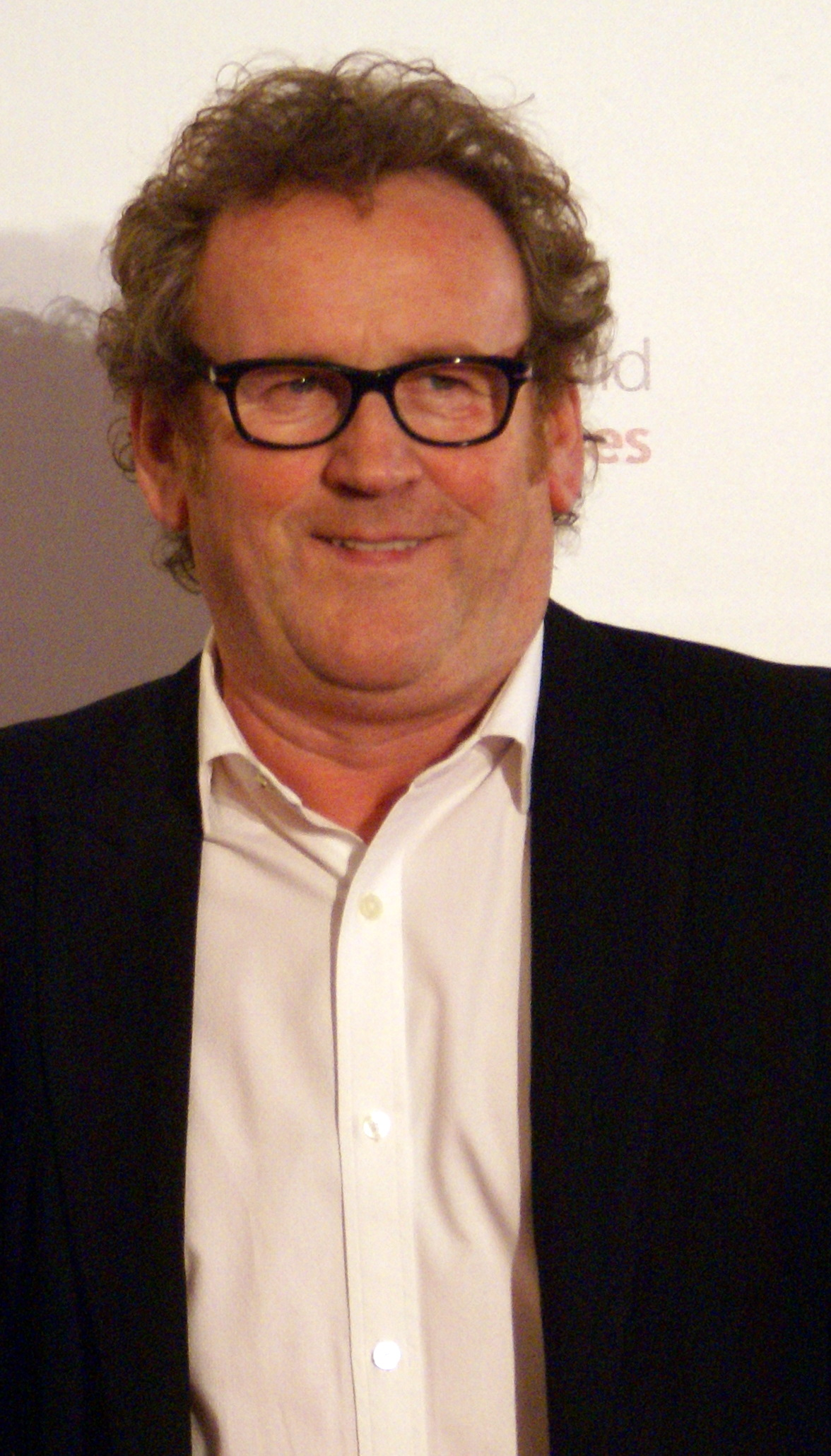
Colm Meaney (pictured) called "Captive Pursuit" his favourite episode of the first season.

Originally titled "A Matter of Breeding", director Corey Allen said the episode intended to move away from the "squeaky clean" plots of Star Trek: The Next Generation. After the franchise's creator Gene Roddenberry banned disagreements between characters in The Next Generation, this became one of the main elements that the producers wanted to include in the new series. In the episode, this was shown by O'Brien releasing Tosk, but originally, during the teaser segment at the beginning, it was intended to show dabo girl Miss Sarda propositioning Commander Sisko. "We had long conversations on that and ultimately came down on the conservative side, but we'd never even had that kind of conference on TNG", Allen explained. Executive producer Michael Piller wrote the episode with writer Jill Sherman Donner, who had previous credits on television shows such as Magnum P.I..

Michael Westmore designed the make-up in the episode, drawing inspiration from an alligator he saw in National Geographic to create Tosk's appearance. The Hunters were initially intended to appear more alien-like, with steam rising out of their masks as they opened to reveal a demonic face with huge eyes and scaly skin. However, due to budgetary restraints, the original costume and make-up plans were scrapped and the description was revised to become "a rather mundane humanoid face, not far off human." The transporter effect used by the Hunters was inspired by the science fiction film Metropolis (1927), specifically by the scene in which the robot Maria undergoes a transformation.

"Captive Pursuit" marked the first appearance in the Star Trek franchise for both Scott MacDonald and Gerrit Graham. MacDonald appeared a week later in The Next Generation episode "Face of the Enemy" as Subcommander N'Vek. He would also appear in the DS9 episode "Hippocratic Oath" and the Star Trek: Voyager pilot "Caretaker". In Star Trek: Enterprise, he was cast in the recurring role of the Xindi-Reptilian antagonist Guruk Dolim through the third season. Graham was once considered, along with René Auberjonois and Andrew Robinson, for the role of Odo, which went to Auberjonois. Robinson was later cast as Elim Garak. Graham later gained the role of Quinn, the second Q in Voyager, in the episode "Death Wish".

The episode was positively received by the cast and crew. Meaney called "Captive Pursuit" a "classic Star Trek story" and praised MacDonald's performance, naming the episode his favourite of the first season. Michael Piller said it was one of his favourite episodes of the season, while Rick Berman said it was his favourite out of the first six episodes of the series, and noted that the connection between Tosk and O'Brien was "charming".

== Reception ==
"Captive Pursuit" was first released in broadcast syndication on January 31, 1993. It received a Nielsen rating of 12.9 percent, placing third in its time slot. This was the fourth highest rated episode of the season, behind "Emissary", "Past Prologue" and "A Man Alone". It won the Emmy Award for outstanding individual achievement in make-up for a series.

Keith DeCandido gave the episode a rating of 7/10 for Tor.com, calling it a "good, solid, well-put-together episode anchored by two excellent performances," despite believing the first season of DS9 was weak prior to the episode "Duet". DeCandido noted that "Captive Pursuit" was a good Prime Directive-themed episode with interesting alien cultures. He described Colm Meaney as "magnificent", and said that Scott MacDonald gave a "superb performance".

Zack Handlen, in his review for The A.V. Club, said that the episode was formulaic, lacked substance and was simply designed to give Meaney something to do. He praised the dynamic between Meaney and MacDonald, but said that "while not a classic, [the episode was] entertaining enough" and it helped to set up O'Brien's character as one to balance the complexity of some of the newer characters introduced on the show.

In 2015, Geek.com suggested this episode as a "recommended episode" for their abbreviated Star Trek: Deep Space Nine binge-watching guide.

== Home media release ==
The first home media release of the episode was on VHS cassette in the United States on September 10, 1996. It was part of the initial launch of cassettes by Paramount Home Video which saw the first six episodes released and was on a single episode cassette.

This was released on VHS in the UK, paired with "Babel".

This episode was released on LaserDisc paired with "Babel" on one double sided disc, on October 1, 1996 in the United States. It retailed for 34.98 USD and was published by Paramount Home Video.

It was released on DVD as part of the season one box set on June 3, 2003. This episode was released in 2017 on DVD again with the complete series box set, which had 176 episodes on 48 discs.
