= The Moon Moth =

- Short story by Jack Vance
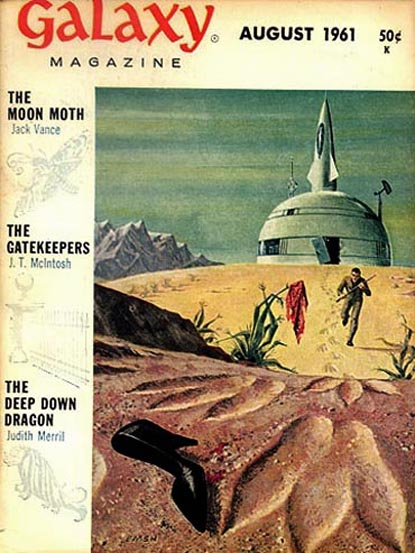
- Country: United States
- Language: English
- Genre: Science fiction

Publication
- Publisher: Galaxy
- Media type: Print (Magazine)
- Publication date: August 1961
- Pages: 36

"The Moon Moth" is a science fiction novelette by American author Jack Vance, first published in the August 1961 edition of Galaxy Science Fiction. It is set in the same fictional universe as Vance's Demon Princes series; the planet Sirene is mentioned and the cultural importance of face masks explained in chapter 7 of Star King.

== Plot summary ==
Edwer Thissell, the new consul from Earth to the planet Sirene, has trouble adjusting to the local culture. The Sirenese cover their faces and heads with exquisitely crafted masks that indicate their social status (strakh) and mood. They also communicate by singing, accompanying themselves with one of a score of musical instruments, selected based on the social situation and feelings. Furthermore, errors of etiquette may prove fatal. Thissell is a clumsy musician and lacks confidence in the alien society, so he is forced to wear a lowly Moon Moth mask.

One day, he receives an alert to arrest a notorious assassin named Haxo Angmark, who is due on the next starship. Thissell, however, gets the message too late. He races to the spaceport, but Angmark, thoroughly comfortable with Sirenese customs, has already landed and disappeared. Thissell commits a number of serious social blunders in his haste to reach the spaceport and in enquiring after Angmark.

The next morning, Thissell is shown the body of an offworlder. He concludes that, since the fugitive would be unable to pass himself off as a native, Angmark must have killed and taken the place of one of the other three expatriates on the planet. But since even they wear masks, how is Thissell to know which one?

Eventually, Thissell solves the mystery by borrowing a slave from each of the suspects and determining their masters' mask preferences before and after Angmark's arrival. He succeeds in identifying his quarry, but is captured and forced to walk unmasked in public (the ultimate humiliation to the natives), while Angmark masquerades as Thissell by wearing his Moon Moth mask. However, the Sirenese turn on Angmark and kill him for the perversion of unmasking another man and, ironically, for Thissell's previous gaffes.

Thissell represents his humiliation as an act of bravery, asking if any present would be willing to be so shamed in order to destroy his enemy. With his new confidence, Thissell receives offers of gifts (the acceptance of which would enhance the prestige of both the giver and the recipient). He first goes with a mask maker to procure a covering more befitting his new strakh.

== Adaptations ==
First Second Books published a graphic novel edition by Jack Vance and illustrated by Humayoun Ibrahim in May 2012.

== Translations ==
The story has been translated into numerous other languages, including Italian, French, German, Russian, Japanese and Esperanto (see below for Esperanto translation).

== Influence ==
The story served as the inspiration for the island of 'Visage' in the 2015 video game Sunless Sea.
