= Past Prologue =

- Star Trek: Deep Space Nine episode
- Episode no.: Season 1 Episode 3
- Directed by: Winrich Kolbe
- Written by: Katharyn Powers
- Production code: 404
- Original air date: January 10, 1993

Guest appearances
- Jeffrey Nordling as Tahna Los; Andrew Robinson as Garak; Gwynyth Walsh as B'Etor; Barbara March as Lursa; Susan Bay as Adm. Rollman; Vaughn Armstrong as Gul Danar; Richard Ryder as Deputy; Mark Allen Shepherd as Morn

Episode chronology
← Previous "Emissary"	Next → "A Man Alone"
- Star Trek: Deep Space Nine season 1

"Past Prologue" is the third episode of the American science fiction television series Star Trek: Deep Space Nine, broadcast during the first season. It originally aired in broadcast syndication beginning on January 10, 1993. The episode was written by Katharyn Powers, with additional elements added by executive producer Michael Piller and co-producer Peter Allan Fields. It was directed by Winrich Kolbe.

Set in the 24th century, the series follows the adventures on Deep Space Nine, a space station located near a stable wormhole between the Alpha and Gamma quadrants of the Milky Way Galaxy, near the planet Bajor, as the Bajorans recover from a brutal decades-long occupation by the imperialistic Cardassians. In this episode, a Bajoran terrorist seeks asylum aboard the station from pursuing Cardassians, publicly renouncing his past violent ways. He begins liaising with the Duras sisters (Barbara March and Gwynyth Walsh), leading to suspicion that he was planning further acts of terrorism and causing Major Kira Nerys (Nana Visitor) to consider her loyalties.

The episode introduces the character of Garak, played by Andrew Robinson, who would return in the second season and made continued appearances throughout the series. The character's traits were developed by Robinson, who was praised for his work by Kolbe. "Past Prologue" was the second most watched episode of the season, receiving a Nielsen rating of 13.4 percent. It was received positively by critics, who praised the introduction of Garak, although it was suggested that the plot was predictable due to the need to maintain the status quo at the end of the episode.

== Plot ==
The crew of Deep Space Nine rescue the Bajoran Tahna Los (Jeffrey Nordling) from a vessel that is being attacked by the Cardassians. They state that Tahna is a known member of a terrorist organization and demand his return, but Tahna asks for political asylum, pleading to his former friend Major Kira Nerys (Nana Visitor) for help. Commander Benjamin Sisko (Avery Brooks) grants his request. Later, Odo (René Auberjonois) spots Tahna with the Duras sisters (Barbara March and Gwynyth Walsh) making covert discussions. Tahna also seeks to gain the use of a runabout from Kira.

Dr. Julian Bashir (Alexander Siddig), thanks to his new-found friend Elim Garak (Andrew Robinson), overhears the Duras sisters planning to rendezvous with the Bajoran to give him a vial of bilitrium, a crystalline compound that can release a tremendous amount of power, but only if connected to an antimatter converter. Garak reveals why the Cardassians were chasing Tahna: he stole one from them, meaning he will have the component materials required to build a bomb.

With no solid evidence to act currently, the crew allow him to take a runabout and intend to arrest him after the transaction. Kira finds herself confused about her own past with the Bajoran resistance and where her current loyalties stand, and offers to go with Tahna in the runabout. Commander Sisko and Chief Miles O'Brien (Colm Meaney) wait in a second runabout nearby while Tahna and Kira complete the transaction. When the second runabout appears, Tahna realizes he has been set up; matters are further complicated by the arrival of the Cardassian warship.

Tahna orders Kira at gunpoint to return to the station, intending to collapse the wormhole with an explosive device, because then Bajor will have no motivation to invite Federation presence on Bajoran territory, which he sees as a new occupation. Kira lurches the runabout to one side, causing Tahna to fall over and allowing her to pilot the ship through the wormhole to the Gamma Quadrant; where she ejects the bomb causing it to explode harmlessly in space. However, Tahna has regained control of his weapon and orders Kira to return to the Alpha Quadrant. There, Sisko gives Tahna an ultimatum, either to give himself over to the station's authorities, or to wait to be destroyed by the Cardassians. Tahna hands over his weapon to Kira, and turns himself in; Kira explains that he may someday come to understand why this was the right thing to do.

== Production ==
Although it was shown second in broadcast order, following the pilot, "Past Prologue" was filmed third, following "A Man Alone". There were several changes to hair and makeup following "A Man Alone", including modifications to Odo, and a simpler, closer haircut for Nana Visitor in her role as Major Kira. Visitor had pushed for her changes, as she did not find it believable that the character would style her hair on a daily basis, instead wanting a look that took minimal effort. The episode was directed by Winrich Kolbe, in line with executive producer Rick Berman's policy of only allowing directors with previous experience on Star Trek: The Next Generation work on the first season of Deep Space Nine. He would go on to direct the series finale of The Next Generation, "All Good Things...", and 48 episodes of the franchise across four separate series.

Katharyn Powers received the sole writing credit on the episode, although elements such as Garak were created by co-producer Peter Allan Fields. Powers had previously written "Code of Honor", a first season episode of The Next Generation. An initial version of her script featured Kira and Tahna as lovers, which was rejected by executive producer Michael Piller. The ending originally showed the terrorist giving up his violent ways and seeking peace with the Cardassians before being killed by the Bajorans. The episode was named after the line from William Shakespeare's The Tempest; "what's past is prologue."

=== Guest appearances ===
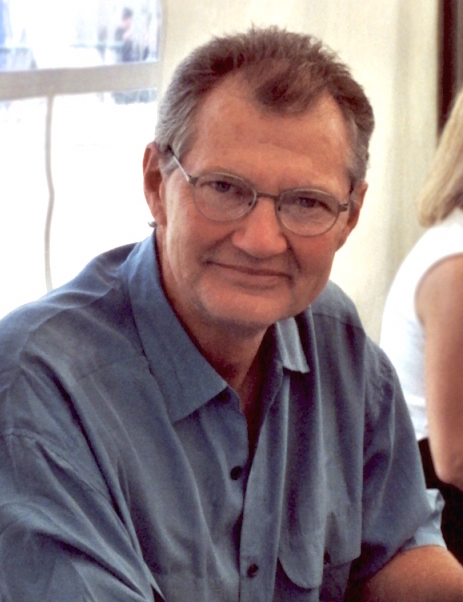
"Past Prologue" marked the first appearance of Garak, played by Andrew Robinson (pictured).

Following a suggestion by Piller, the Duras sisters were written into the episode. The duo had previously appeared in the two-part The Next Generation episode "Redemption" and would go on to appear in "Firstborn" and the film Star Trek Generations. The character of Admiral Rollman made her first appearance in "Past Prologue", and would later return in the second season episode "Whispers". Susan Bay, who played Rollman, has a long-standing relationship with the Star Trek franchise as she was the wife of Leonard Nimoy, the actor who portrayed Spock in Star Trek: The Original Series and the film series. Also appearing in this episode was Vaughn Armstrong, who would go on to play thirteen different characters within the franchise, including the recurring part of Rear Admiral Maxwell Forrest in Star Trek: Enterprise.

The episode is best known for the introduction of the recurring character Elim Garak. Fields said of the character at the time, "we didn't want to make him an out and out spy, because then what would you do with him after the episode? You'd have to put him in jail on Bajor. So we tread a pretty thin line." Fields had decided when creating the character that the station needed a Cardassian on-board and when no-one objected to his suggestion to put him in a tailor shop, that became Garak's profession. This was a reference to The Man from U.N.C.L.E., which used a tailor shop as a front, as Fields had begun his writing career on that series. Andrew Robinson had originally been considered for the part of Odo, and was one of the final three actors vying for the part alongside Gerrit Graham and René Auberjonois. Robinson was invited back to audition for Garak, while Graham was cast as the Hunter in "Captive Pursuit".

Kolbe thought at first that casting Robinson was "really off-the-way", but he felt the actor made the episode "bloom". He gave general guidelines to Robinson about how he could approach the character, but it was Robinson who developed the traits of the character. Kolbe also praised the writing, saying: "I wish there was more writing like this for television. I think we'd have a much healthier industry." Robinson said that Garak was a complicated character which required the use of subtext, adding that it was not a simple way to portray a character "but when you do it well, you really get people's attention". He was told by the producers that they intended to bring him back onto the show, but in a later interview, he said that this was commonplace in the industry and does not usually occur. When he was brought back for the second-season episode "Cardassians", executive producer Ira Steven Behr apologized for not bringing him back sooner.

== Reception ==
"Past Prologue" was first released in broadcast syndication on January 11, 1993. It received a Nielsen rating of 13.4 percent, placing second in its timeslot. This was the second highest rated episode of the season, behind "Emissary".

In 2012, Zack Handlen wrote for The A.V. Club that Garak was "striking" from his first appearance, and it was immediately apparent that he was an important character. He compared Kira's problem of loyalty to those experienced by Ro Laren in The Next Generation episode "Preemptive Strike", however it didn't work as well since the show would have to maintain the status quo by the end of the episode, since Kira was a main character. He summarized, saying that it was a good episode but not great.

In 2013, Keith DeCandido wrote for Tor.com that Garak could have been a "walking, talking cliché", but that Robinson "imbues him with such charm that it’s impossible not to love the character". He said that it was an excellent episode, due in part to the way that the character's dynamics are formed. He gave it a rating of eight out of ten.

== Home video releases ==
The first home media release of the episode was on VHS cassette in the United States on September 10, 1996. It was part of the initial launch of cassettes by Paramount Home Video which saw the first six episodes released and was on a single episode cassette.

"Past Prologue" was released with "A Man Alone" on September 24, 1996 on LaserDisc in the United States.

On February 8, 1997 this episode was released on LaserDisc in Japan as part of the half-season box set 1st Season vol.1. This included episodes from "Emissary" to "Move Along Home" with both English and Japanese audio tracks.

It was released on DVD as part of the season one box set on June 3, 2003. This episode was released in 2017 on DVD with the complete series box set, which had 176 episodes on 48 discs.
