= Richard Ryder (actor) =

American actor (1942–1995)

- Born: August 20, 1942; Rochester, New York, U.S.
- Died: October 27, 1995 (aged 53); Hollywood, California, U.S.
- Occupation: Actor

Richard Ryder (August 20, 1942 – October 27, 1995) was an American actor from Rochester, New York.

== Career ==
Ryder starred in the film Abuse and appeared in Forever Young, as well as the television movies Threesome, Laker Girls, Cries Unheard: The Donna Yaklich Story and When the Dark Man Calls.

He also played a Bajoran deputy in the Star Trek: Deep Space Nine episodes "Past Prologue" and "Babel" and also guest starred in Dream On, Designing Women and Party of Five.

With a live performance career that spanned thirty years, Richard appeared in Las Vegas at the Lido de Paris, sang with Juliette Prowse and was Marty Allen’s stage partner. Theater credits are many regional, off-Broadway, Broadway, and the national tour of They're Playing Our Song alongside Dawn Wells of Gilligan's Island fame and Lorna Luft.

== Personal life ==
Ryder died in Hollywood, California in 1995, of AIDS, aged 53.

== Filmography ==
=== Film ===
Year	Title	Role	Notes
1983	Abuse	Larry	
1992	Forever Young	Pilot at Airshow	

=== Television ===
Year	Title	Role	Notes
1984	Threesome	Photographer	Television film
1990	Laker Girls	Mr. Weisberg	Television film
1990	Dream On	Chorus	Episode: "Angst for the Memories"
1992	Designing Women	Customer	Episode: "Viva Las Vegas"
1993	Star Trek: Deep Space Nine	Bajoran Deputy	2 episodes
1994	Cries Unheard: The Donna Yaklich Story	Prosecutor	Television film
1994	Harts of the West	—	Episode: "Jake and Duke's Excellent Adventure"
1995	Party of Five	Delivery Man	Episode: "Aftershocks"
1995	When the Dark Man Calls	Heavy Man	Television film
1996	Quack Pack	Voice	2 episodes
