= André Pirro =

French musicologist and organist (1869–1943)

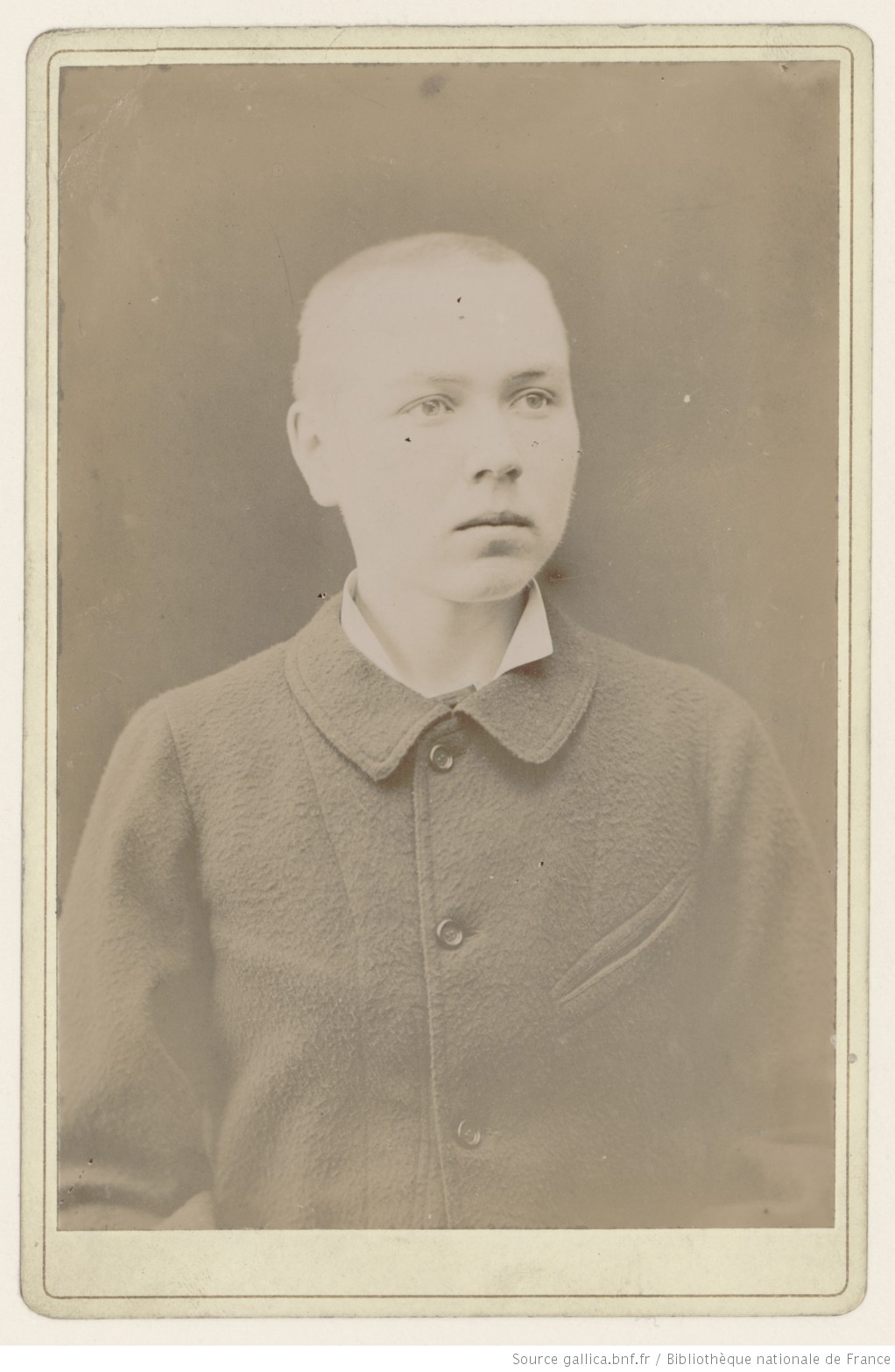
- André Pirro in 1880
- Born: 12 February 1869; Saint-Dizier, France
- Died: 11 November 1943 (aged 74); Paris, France
- Occupation(s): musicologist, organist
- Parent: Jean Pirro

André Gabriel Edmée Pirro (12 February 1869 – 11 November 1943) was a French musicologist and an organist.

Born in Saint-Dizier, Pirro learned to play the organ from his father Jean Pirro. In Paris where he became and organist and a choirmaster for the Collège Stanislas de Paris. He studied with César Franck and taught music history at the Schola Cantorum. Pirro published his academic thesis on the Aesthetics of Bach in 1907, followed by Descartes and the Music'. His famous pupils include Yvonne Rokseth, Vladimir Fedorov, Dragan Plamenac, Armand Machabey, Geneviève Thibault de Chambure, Marc Pincherle, Jacques Chailley, Eugénie Droz, and Aimée Van de Wiele. See: List of music students by teacher: N to Q#André Pirro. These days he is probably most often remembered through his musicological collaborations with Alexandre Guilmant concerning reprints of ancient organ music.

== Publications ==
- L'Esthétique de Jean-Sébastien Bach (Paris, 1907), English translation by Joe Armstrong The Aesthetic of Johann Sebastian Bach (Lanham, MD, 2014),
- L'orgue de Jean-Sébastien Bach (Paris, 1895),
- Jean-Sébastien Bach (Paris, 1906), English translation by Mervyn Savill J. S. Bach (New York, 1957),
- Descartes et la musique (Paris, 1907)
- Dietrich Buxtehude (Paris, 1911),
- Schütz (Paris, 1913),
- Jean-Sébastien Bach, auteur comique (Madrid, 1915),
- Les Clavecinistes : étude critique (Paris, 1924),
- La Musique à Paris sous le règne de Charles VI, 1380-1422 (Strasbourg, 1930),
- La Musique française du Moyen Âge à la Révolution (Paris, 1940),
- Histoire de la Musique de la fin du XI^{e} siècle à la fin du XVI^{e} (Paris, 1940),
- numerous articles in French and other journals,
- 14 biographical notes for the Archives des maîtres de l'orgue (Paris, 1897–1909).
