= Boleslas Gajewski =

French linguist

Boleslas Gajewski was a French linguist who was the author of the grammar of the musical language Solresol, originally published in 1902. He was the son of Vincent Gajewski, the president of the Committee for study and progress of Solresol.

== Works ==
- Grammaire du Solresol, ou langue universelle de Fr. Sudre. Paris, 1902.
