= Babel (Star Trek: Deep Space Nine) =

- Star Trek: Deep Space Nine episode
- Episode no.: Season 1 Episode 5
- Directed by: Paul Lynch
- Story by: Sally Caves; Ira Steven Behr
- Teleplay by: Michael McGreevey; Naren Shankar
- Production code: 405
- Original air date: January 25, 1993

Guest appearances
- Jack Kehler as Captain Jaheel; Matthew Faison as Surmak Ren; Ann Gillespie as Nurse Jabara; Geraldine Farrell as Galis Blin; Joe Zenga as Asoth; Kathleen Wirt as Aphasia Victim; Lee Brooks as Aphasia Victim; Richard Ryder as Bajoran Deputy; Frank Novak as Businessman; Todd Feder as Federation Male; Mark Allen Shepherd as Morn

Episode chronology
← Previous "A Man Alone"	Next → "Captive Pursuit"
- Star Trek: Deep Space Nine season 1

"Babel" is the fifth episode of the American science fiction television series Star Trek: Deep Space Nine. The episode aired on television on January 25, 1993.

Set in the 24th century, the series follows the adventures on Deep Space Nine, a space station located near a stable wormhole between the Alpha and Gamma quadrants of the Milky Way Galaxy, near the planet Bajor, as the Bajorans recover from a brutal decades-long occupation by the imperialistic Cardassians. In this episode, a biological weapon causes the population of DS9 to have difficulty communicating.

== Plot ==
An overworked Chief O'Brien is attempting to repair numerous malfunctions throughout the station, including most of the station's food replicators. He unknowingly activates a device hidden in one of the replicators. Shortly afterwards, O'Brien begins showing signs of aphasia: he becomes unable to speak coherently, or comprehend spoken language.

Lt. Dax soon becomes aphasic as well. Dr. Bashir discovers that the aphasia is caused by a virus in the food created by replicators on the command level. People all over the station begin showing signs of infection. In addition to aphasia, the virus causes a dangerously high and potentially deadly fever in its victims. The station is put under quarantine to keep the virus from spreading.

Odo discovers that the bartender Quark has been selling food from a replicator in an unoccupied room on the command level, resulting in the contaminated food being spread all over the station. The virus mutates to become airborne, endangering the entire population of the station.

Major Kira soon finds a module in the last replicator O'Brien had worked on; Bashir discovers that it wrote the aphasia virus into the molecular pattern of any food being replicated. Bashir determines that the virus was engineered by a Bajoran terrorist during the time of the Cardassian occupation of Bajor.

The doctor who created the virus is long dead, but one of his fellow resistance fighters, Surmak Ren, is now the administrator at a Bajoran hospital. Kira believes Dr. Surmak may have knowledge of the virus, so she decides to bring him to DS9. At first, Commander Sisko refuses to allow Kira to leave, but she assures him she will not break quarantine. Kira flies to Bajor and transports Surmak directly to her runabout. Initially, Surmak refuses to help, but relents when Kira reveals that by being aboard the runabout, Surmak is also infected with the aphasia virus.

Meanwhile, virtually the entire crew is incapacitated. A freighter captain, desperate to avoid infection, tries to leave DS9 without clearance, and ruptures his ship's power core in the process. To prevent the resulting explosion from destroying half the station, the ship must be ejected from its dock. Odo recruits Quark, who is unaffected by the virus, to assist him in jettisoning the ship, and it explodes at a safe distance. Surmak is eventually able to create an antidote for the aphasia virus.

== Reception ==
Keith DeCandido gave the episode a rating of 6/10 for Tor.com, writing: "I could watch an hour of just O’Brien dashing about the station trying desperately to keep up with all the systems failures while he does a slow burn of sleep-deprived snark, and it’s pretty much impossible for a scene between Rene Auberjonois and Armin Shimerman to not be delightful, and this episode has several."

Trek Navigator's Mark A. Altman gave the episode 1.5 stars, stating: "[t]he clichéd virus story is a tired premise that is resolved too quickly."

== Releases ==
The first home media release of the episode was on VHS cassette in the United States on September 10, 1996. It was part of the initial launch of cassettes by Paramount Home Video which saw the first six episodes released and was on a single episode cassette.

This was released on VHS in the UK paired with "Captive Pursuit".

This episode was released on LaserDisc paired with "Captive Pursuit" on one double sided disc, on October 1, 1996 in the United States. It retailed for 34.98 USD and was published by Paramount Home Video.

On February 8, 1997 this episode was released on LaserDisc in Japan as part of the half-season box set 1st Season Vol. 1. This included episodes from "Emissary" to "Move Along Home" with both English and Japanese audio tracks.

It was released on DVD as part of the season one box set on June 3, 2003. This episode was released again in 2017 on DVD with the complete series box set, which had 176 episodes on 48 discs.

== See also ==
- "Journey to Babel" (TOS episode that aired November 17, 1967)
- Medical fiction
