= Kēlen =

Constructed language created in 1998

- Created by: Sylvia Sotomayor
- Date: 1998
- Setting and usage: alien species (the Kēleñi)
- Purpose: Constructed language: artistic language; Kēlen
- Sources: a priori language, consciously rejecting linguistic universals to create an alien language

Language codes
- ISO 639-3: None (mis)
- Glottolog: None
- IETF: art-x-kelen

Kēlen (IPA: [ˈkeː.len]) is a constructed language created by Sylvia Sotomayor in 1998. The language is designed to be a truly alien language by violating a key linguistic universal — namely that all human languages have verbs. In Kēlen, relationships between noun phrases making up the sentence are expressed by one of four relationals. According to Sotomayor, these relationals perform the functions of verbs but lack any of the semantic content. However, the semantic content found in common verbs, such as those that are semantic primes, can also be found in Kēlen's relationals, which calls into question whether Kēlen is technically verbless. Despite its distinctive grammar, Kēlen is an expressive and intelligible language. Texts written in Kēlen have been translated into other languages by several people other than the creator of the language. In an interview, Sotomayor stated that she aimed for Kēlen to be naturalistic apart from its verblessness, and that to achieve this she employs the principle "change one thing and keep everything else the same".

== Background and history ==
In its concultural setting, Kēlen is spoken by an alien species called the Kēleñi, for whom the language was created.

Kēlen has gained recognition and acclaim within the conlanging community. It is mentioned prominently by Sarah L. Higley in her book Hildegard of Bingen's Unknown Language: An edition, translation and discussion (Palgrave Macmillan 2007), The New Middle Ages ISBN 1-4039-7673-2, ISBN 978-1-4039-7673-4) where she discusses Lingua Ignota in the context of constructed languages up to the present day. Higley describes Kēlen as an example of the desire for originality in contemporary conlanging, by virtue of its verbless grammar, and notes that it is a prominent example of a conlang created by a woman. She also says that "fellow conlangers consider Kēlen to be efficient, elegant, strange and innovative, and its writing system is greatly admired." Logan Kearsley discusses Kēlen in his essay "How to Not Verb", describing it as "almost the prototypical example of a conlang without verbs" and the most well fleshed-out of the languages he reviewed for the essay. However, he does mention that by some definitions, relationals could be considered a small closed class of verbs. Peter Bleackley cites Kēlen as a key influence on his conlang iljena. Kēlen is also discussed at length in a book by M. Yu. Sidorova and O.N. Shuvalova, including several glossed examples.

At the third Language Creation Conference David J. Peterson awarded the Smiley Award to Kēlen, describing it as "an engineered language with the soul of an artistic language". Peterson explains that while its experimental structure is in many ways similar to an engineered language, the amount of linguistic and concultural detail given by Sotomayor (including inflection of the relationals, three different scripts, and information on Kēleñi culture and society such as a calendar and a method of divination) make it a fully-fledged artistic project rather than a simple experiment.

== Phonology ==
=== Consonants ===
	Labial	Dental	Alveolar	Post- Alveolar	Palatal	Velar
Nasal	m		n		ɲ ⟨ñ⟩	ŋ
Plosive	p		t		c	k
Fricative	ɸ ⟨w⟩	θ ⟨þ⟩	s	ʃ ⟨x⟩	ç ⟨j⟩	x ⟨h⟩
Lateral			l		ʎ ⟨λ⟩	
Trill			r			

Sylvia Sotomayor analyses the voiceless alveolar fricative /s/ as a stop, because "it used to be [pronounced] like German <z> or /ts/. This pronunciation is still found in some dialects." In addition, all sonorants, except /ʎ/, can be geminated, as follows: mm /mː/, nn /nː/, ññ /ɲː/, ŋŋ /ŋː/, ll /lː/, rr /rː/.

=== Vowels ===
Kēlen has the same five monophthongs as in Spanish, with the addition of vowel length and diphthongs making it similar to the system found in Hawaiian. Some dialects also use a central short monophthong.

==== Monophthongs ====
	Short			Long	
	Front	Central	Back	Front	Back
Close	i	ɨ ⟨y⟩	u	iː ⟨ī⟩	uː ⟨ū⟩
Mid	e		o	eː ⟨ē⟩	oː ⟨ō⟩
Open	a			aː ⟨ā⟩	

==== Diphthongs ====
Sotomayor specifies that when any two vowels appear next to one another that are not specified as being read as diphthongs, they are instead spoken as two separate vowels.

Short Diphthongs
	-e	-o
i-	ie /je/	
a-	ae /aj/	ao /aw/

Long Diphthongs
	-e	-o
i-	iē /jeː/	
a-	āe /aːj/	āo /aːw/

=== Syllable structure ===
Kēlen uses a (C)V(C) syllable structure.

== Writing systems ==
The romanization of Kēlen is given in the phonology section next to the phonemes that each Latin character represents. However, Kēlen also features three original writing systems by Sylvia Sotomayor.

- Kēlen Writing System – While not given its own name by Sotomayor, the primary writing system of Kēlen is ostensibly an alphabet, and bears a superficial resemblance to Devanagari.
- Box Script – A variation upon the standard writing system which encloses text within a box.
- Ceremonial Interlace Alphabet – An alphabet used for ceremonial purposes where each character is represented by a pattern which crosses over itself, "interlacing." as Sotomayor says, "Letters start in the bottom right hand corner, and continue over - under - over - under (or under - over, etc.) until they end at the top right hand corner."

== Grammar ==
=== Syntax ===
The word order of Kēlen depends upon the relational used in a given sentence. However, adjectives always come after nouns.

=== Pronouns ===
Personal pronouns in Kēlen have singular, dual, paucal, and plural forms, as well as distinctions of clusivity in the first-person.

Personal Pronouns
		Singular	Dual	Paucal	Plural
1st Person	Exclusive	liēn	liēnne	lēim	liēþ
1st Person	Inclusive	liēn	liēr	ñēim	ñiēþ
2nd Person		riēn	riēnne	rēim	riēþ
3rd Person		sāen	sāenne	sāim	sāeþ

Kēlen features reflexive pronouns, most of which can also be used as so-called "reduced" forms of the ordinary personal pronouns with the exception of the 3rd person inanimate, "ja". When used as reduced pronouns, some are considered more or less polite than others.

Reduced and Relative Pronouns
		Pronoun
1st Person		le
2nd Person		ri
3rd Person	Animate	ma
3rd Person	Inanimate	ja

Le, ri, and ma can all be used as reduced forms of the singular, dual, and paucal of their corresponding full-length personal pronouns. Ma can be freely used in place of any 3rd person pronoun. Using le as a reduced pronoun is considered polite, ri is considered impolite, and ma is "neutral as far as politeness is concerned".

There are three demonstrative pronouns in Kēlen, distinguishing between the proximal, medial, and distal. They can be used as adjectives, and "generally follow the noun they modify, but can immediately precede it. They can also be used to reference a previously mentioned noun. However, in certain contexts, the noun they are assumed to modify is 'place'". The table below outlines potential uses of the demonstrative pronouns.

Demonstrative Pronouns
	Kēlen Pronoun	Usage	
	Kēlen Pronoun	As Modifier	As Standalone
Proximal	xō	this	here
Medial	þō	that	there
Distal	āke	that other	yonder

Indefinite pronouns in Kēlen function similarly to the demonstratives, where they can be used either as modifiers or standalone. Unlike the demonstratives, however, which indefinite is used depends upon number and animacy.

Indefinite Pronouns
		Existential	Universal		Negative
		Existential	Distributive	Non-Distributive	Negative
Singular	Animate	manahan			
Singular	Inanimate	janahan			
Collective	Animate		manaren		mawae
Collective	Inanimate		janaren		jawae
Plural	Animate	honahan	mannarien	honnarien	howae
Plural	Inanimate	honahan	jannarien	honnarien	howae

=== Nouns ===
==== Animacy ====
Kēlen makes extensive use of a system of animacy, with a set of mandatory prefixes on all noun stems, the usage of which depends upon the speaker's view of what they are talking about. Sotomayor provides an animacy hierarchy as follows, with 1 being the most likely to be considered animate by any given speaker, and 7 the least:

1. Kēleñi Kin
2. Kēleñi Non-Kin
3. Īrāñi & Humans
4. Natural Forces, Pets
5. Animals, Natural Objects
6. Tools
7. Everything Else

Prefixes are given for animate, inanimate, and possessed nouns. Sotomayor describes the latter as "[referring] to those inanimates that are considered to be part of a person, such as body parts."

	Prefix
Animate	m(a)-
Inanimate	j(a)-
Inanimate	an
1st Person Possessed	l(e)-
2nd Person Possessed	r(i)-
3rd Person Possessed	s(a)-

==== Number ====
Kēlen's nouns are suffixed for grammatical number, distinguishing between the singular and the plural. The suffixes used for the singular are dependent upon the ending of the noun stem, and the suffixes for the plural depend upon the animacy.

Singular Suffixes
Stem Ending	Suffix
Any vowel; A single nasal; A lateral or trill; "rj"	-
Any Pair of Consonants (except "rj"); Stem with "-īk" or "-īw" suffix	-e
Everywhere else	-a

Plural Suffixes
Animacy	Suffix
Animate	-ien
Inanimate	-i
Possessed	-i

=== Relationals ===
According to Sotomayor, in lieu of verbs Kēlen uses four so-called "Relationals". She describes these on her site with examples of the potential uses of each within the context of larger sentences, with the abbreviation "NP" for "Noun Phrase".

==== La ====
La is the relational of existence: "La is used to express a static state, a location, or equivalence." It inflects for tense, aspect, and modality.

Pattern	English equivalent
LA NP	NP exists, there is NP
LA NP LOC (NP)	NP is at a location
LA NP (ñe) NP	NP is (the same as) NP
LA NP pa NP	NP is/has/contains NP

==== Ñi ====
Ñi is the relational of change: "Ñi is used to express a coming into existence, a change in state (when the noun phrase that is the object of ñi has more than one noun in it), or a change in location." Ñi inflects for agent.

Pattern	English Equivalent
ÑI NP	NP (now) exists, N_{1} is (now) N_{2}
ÑI NP ā|tō NP	NP (now) exists, because of volitional|non-volitional NP
ÑI NP LOC (NP)	NP is to/from a location

==== Se ====
Se is the transactional relational, "Se is used to express giving and receiving, with the object given or received as the object of se and the giver as the source and the receiver as the beneficiary. This pattern is extended to encompass speech and information. Se is also used to express sensing and experiencing of mental states." Se inflects for source, beneficiary and tense.

Pattern	English Equivalent
SE(.SRC;BEN) NP	SRC gives NP to BEN or BEN receives NP from SRC
SE(.SRC;BEN) NP ke|to NP mo NP	SRC gives NP to BEN or BEN receives NP from SRC
SE(.SRC;BEN) NP ien X	SRC says or expresses NP or BEN hears NP and NP=X
SE.BEN NP	BEN experiences/senses NP
SE N	N is introduced.

==== Pa ====
Pa is the most recent relational in-fiction, "In many ways it expresses the same thing as LA NP pa NP", but indicates a passive meaning. Pa is never inflected.

Pattern	English Equivalent
PA NP_{1} NP_{2}	NP_{1} is/has NP_{2}
