= Timerio =

Constructed language based on numbers

Timerio is a constructed language based on numbers. It was presented to public in 1921 by the Berlin architect Tiemer as a pure literary language and should be used for automated translations. The idea was, that every concept is assigned by a number. The language shows similarities to the Dewey Decimal Classification by Melvil Dewey.

One of the only known sentences is the number-combination 1-80-17, which means I love you. Here the 1 stands for I, 17 for you (accusative or objective) and 80 for [to] love. Alternatively, 2 can also be used as a description of you (singular, nominative) according to some forms. Given the basic concept that 1 equals I, and that the designation starts from that viewpoint onwards, it is a logical alternative to accept 2 as another term for you.

The comparative is shown by *, the superlative by *. "And" is represented by +. A prefix of > makes a root an adjective. The genitive takes the suffix II, the dative takes III. Tenses are shown with an underscore below the number (past) or a macron above (future). The plural takes superscript ^{2}. Numbers when expressed in a numerical form appear inside brackets.

“1-3̅0̅-(3)-980^{2}” means: “I’ll write three letters”.
“6215-8_0-164->1673-980^{2}” means: “The father loved the big coloured letters”.

== See also ==
- Pasigraphy
- Solresol, a constructed language based around musical notes.
