= François Sudre =

French author and musician

Jean-François Sudre
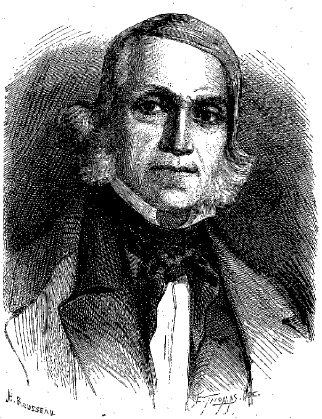
- Born: 15 August 1787; Albi, Kingdom of France
- Died: 3 October 1862 (aged 75)
- Occupations: violinist, composer, music teacher
- Known for: Inventor of Solrésol

Jean-François Sudre, also written Sudré (15 August 1787 – 3 October 1862), was a violinist, composer and music teacher who invented a musical language called la Langue musicale universelle or Solrésol.

Sudre was born in Albi in southern France on 15 August 1787. He studied music as a child and, at the age of eighteen, was admitted to the Conservatoire de Paris on 12 May 1806, where he studied violin under François Habeneck and harmony under Charles Simon Catel.

Sudre created a group of musicians who were attempting to develop a way of transmitting language through music. He devised Solrésol in 1827. He trained Édouard Deldevez and Charles Larsonneur to play and interpret his alphabet. A given note would represent a word or a letter of the alphabet. The trio toured France, answering questions from the audience using Sudre's violin. A military application was soon suggested: a bugler on a battlefield could transmit orders to a regiment by playing an appropriate tune. This promising hypothesis came to nothing because the system was too vulnerable to wind and weather. Sudre then offered the military a set of musical cannons, but they declined the suggestion.
