= Armand Machabey =

French musicologist (1886–1966)

- Born: 7 May 1886; Pont-de-Roide-Vermondans (Doubs)
- Died: 27 April 1966 (aged 79); Paris
- Occupation: Musicologist

Armand Machabey (7 May 1886 – 31 August 1966) was a 20th-century French musicologist.

== Biography ==
A student of Vincent d'Indy at the Schola Cantorum de Paris and André Pirro at the Sorbonne, Machabey's thesis Histoire et évolution des formules musicales du Ier au XVe siècle de L'ère chrétienne which he defended in 1928, gave an important place to the music of Guillaume de Machaut, of whom he was one of the specialists by publishing the second complete edition of the Messe de Nostre Dame by (Guillaume de Machaut) in 1948 just after Jacques Chailley. In 1955 he wrote an important monograph in two volumes: Guillaume de Machault, 130-?-1377 : La vie et l'œuvre musical. He was also the author of a Traité de La critique musicale, and another one entitled la Musicologie, as well as several biographies of composers including his master Vincent d'Indy, Anton Bruckner, Maurice Ravel, and Girolamo Frescobaldi.

Machabey was also the publisher of the Tournai Mass and the treaty Terminorum musicæ diffinitorium by Johannes Tinctoris, and with Norbert Dufourcq and Félix Raugel, he directed the Encyclopédie Larousse de la musique (1957–1958).

== Writings ==
- 1945: La Musique des Hittites
- 1946: La Vie et l'œuvre d'Anton Bruckner
- 1947: Maurice Ravel
- 1947: Traité de la Critique musicale
- 1948: Le bel canto
- 1949: Portraits de 30 compositeurs français modernes
- 1952: La Notation musicale.
- 1952: Musique et médecine
- 1952: Frescobaldi.
- 1955: Guillaume de Machaut
- 1955: Genèse de la tonalité musicale classique
- 1955: La Cantilation manichéenne
- 1957 and 1959: Notations musicales non modales
- 1960: Mélanges musicologiques.
