= Teonaht =

Constructed language created in 1962

- Created by: Sally Caves
- Date: 1962
- Setting and usage: Fantasy setting of the Teonim
- Purpose: Constructed language: artistic language; fictional language; Teonaht
- Sources: draws on Indo-European languages: Romance, Germanic and Celtic

Language codes
- ISO 639-3: None (mis)
- Glottolog: None
- IETF: art-x-teonaht

Teonaht /ˈteɪ.oʊnɑːθ/ is a constructed language that has been developed since 1962 by science fiction writer and University of Rochester English professor Sarah Higley, under the pseudonym of Sally Caves. It is spoken in the fantasy setting of the Teonim, a race of polydactyl humans who have a cultural history of worshiping catlike deities.

Teonaht uses the object–subject–verb (OSV) word order, which is rare in natural languages. An interesting feature of Teonaht is that the end of the sentence is the place of greatest emphasis, as what is mentioned last is uppermost in the mind. The language has a "Law of Detachment" whereby suffixes can be moved to the beginnings of words for emphasis and even attach onto other words such as pronouns.

Teonaht is often cited as an example of the genre in articles on the world of Internet-hosted amateur conlanging.

In May 2019, the Washington Post shared audio of Caves singing in Teonaht.
