= Unish =

Constructed language developed by Sejong University

- Created by: Language Research Institute, Sejong University
- Date: 1996
- Setting and usage: International auxiliary language
- Users: None
- Purpose: Constructed language: International auxiliary language; Unish
- Writing system: Latin
- Sources: Vocabulary from fifteen representative languages: English, Spanish, Portuguese, Italian, French, German, Russian, Arabic, Hindi, Greek, Latin, Chinese, Korean, Japanese, Esperanto.

Language codes
- ISO 639-3: None (mis)
- Glottolog: None
- IETF: art-x-unish

Unish is a constructed language developed by a research team at Sejong University, South Korea. The term “Unish” is used in reference to it being cast as a universal language in the globalized era.

The vocabulary of Unish is chosen from among 15 languages: Esperanto and 14 major languages that have 70 million or more native speakers or which were international languages in the past. Decisions are based on the three principles of commonality, short-word length, and simplicity. Consequently, the core vocabulary of Unish is integrated with the simplest words of existing major languages. To date, Unish has a vocabulary of approximately 10,000 words. Sejong University has also offered Unish classes for several years.

== Linguistic properties ==
=== Classification ===
Unish is a constructed language and not genealogically related to any particular ethnic language. The phonological and grammatical structures are based on those of pidgins.

Typologically, in Unish, prepositions and adjectives are placed before the nouns they modify. The word order of a sentence is “subject-verb-object/complement.” This word order is always kept, regardless of a declarative sentence or an interrogative sentence. New terms are formed through the careful selection of words among the aforementioned fifteen languages by seven principles such as: commonality, short word-length, diversity, distinctiveness, simplicity, cultural priority, and compounding.

=== Writing system ===
The Unish alphabet consists exactly of the twenty-six letters of the ISO basic Latin alphabet, which are as follows:

Unish alphabet
Number	1	2	3	4	5	6	7	8	9	10	11	12	13	14	15	16	17	18	19	20	21	22	23	24	25	26	-	-	-
Upper case	A	B	C	D	E	F	G	H	I	J	K	L	M	N	O	P	Q	R	S	T	U	V	W	X	Y	Z	SH	CH	NG
Lower case	a	b	c	d	e	f	g	h	i	j	k	l	m	n	o	p	q	r	s	t	u	v	w	x	y	z	sh	ch	ng
IPA phoneme	a	b	-	d	e	f	ɡ	h	i	d͡ʒ	k	l	m	n	o	p	kw	r	s	t	u	v	w	ks	j	z	ʃ	t͡ʃ	ŋ

It uses three digraphs: ⟨sh⟩, ⟨ch⟩, ⟨ng⟩

=== Phonology ===
Unish has twenty-two pulmonic consonants, five vowels, and two semi-vowels. Unish also accepts commonly used vowels and consonants that tend to be easier to pronounce.

==== Vowels ====
The vowel structure of Unish consists of five vowels that are most commonly used in pidgins as well as in natural languages: [i, e, a, o, u].

==== Semi-vowels ====
In addition to the five vowels, Unish also accepts the semi-vowels [j] and [w] in making more elaborate sounds.

==== Consonants ====
Unish accepts consonants that are easy to pronounce and common to natural languages. For example, the dental sounds of [θ] and [ð] are not generally easy to acquire and pronounce. Hence, these sounds are not included in the consonant system of Unish. Moreover, the correspondence between sounds and spellings are as straightforward as possible, as listed below. The aim is such that anyone with a basic knowledge of the Latin script will find the relations between consonants and letters quite accessible.

==== List ====
IPA name	IPA symbol	Relation between IPA and Unish representation	Spelling	Unish classification
Close front unrounded vowel	[i]	same	i	vowel
Close-mid front unrounded vowel	[e]	same	e	vowel
Open front unrounded vowel	[a]	same	a	vowel
Close-mid back rounded vowel	[o]	same	o	vowel
Close back rounded vowel	[u]	same	u	vowel
Voiced palatal approximant	[j]	different	y	semi-vowel
Voiced labio-velar approximant	[w]	same	w	semi-vowel
Voiced bilabial stop	[b]	same	b	consonant
Voiceless palato-alveolar affricate	[t͜ʃ]	different	ch	consonant
Voiced alveolar stop	[d]	same	d	consonant
Voiceless labiodental fricative	[f]	same	f	consonant
Voiced velar stop	[ɡ]	different	g	consonant
Voiceless glottal fricative	[h]	same	h	consonant
Voiced palato-alveolar affricate	[d͜ʒ]	different	j	consonant
Voiceless velar stop	[k]	same	k	consonant
Voiced alveolar lateral approximant	[l]	same	l	consonant
Voiced bilabial nasal	[m]	same	m	consonant
Voiced alveolar nasal	[n]	same	n	consonant
Voiced velar nasal	[ŋ]	different	ng	consonant
Voiceless bilabial stop	[p]	same	p	consonant
Labialized voiceless velar stop	[kʷ]	different	q	consonant
Voiced alveolar trill	[r]	same	r	consonant
Voiceless alveolar sibilant	[s]	same	s	consonant
Voiceless palato-alveolar sibilant	[ʃ]	different	sh	consonant
Voiceless alveolar stop	[t]	same	t	consonant
Voiced labiodental fricative	[v]	same	v	consonant
–	[ks]	different	x	consonant
Voiced alveolar sibilant	[z]	same	z	consonant

=== Grammar ===
The grammar of Unish was constructed on the basis of the principles of simplicity, logicality, and regularity. For example, irrespective of number (plural or singular) or person (first-person, second-person, or third-person) of a subject, the form of the verb corresponding to the subject does not vary. Nouns have only one marked case, the genitive, which is identical to the plural, following the principles of simplicity and logicality.

Interrogative Sentence

Unish sentences consist of a subject (S), a verb (V), and an object (O)—ordered (S-V-O). This word order is preserved in declarative sentences (DS) as well as in interrogative sentences (IS). In Unish, the difference between a declarative sentence and an interrogative sentence is that the former ends with a period and falling intonation, while the latter ends with a question mark and rising intonation.

Tim lov beisbol game.
{} love baseball game
"Tim loves {the baseball} game."

Tim lov beisbol game?
"Does Tim love the baseball game?"

As a result of this rule, interrogative pronouns (who, what, when, where, why, and how) appear in situ, as opposed to always being placed initially within a sentence.

Sarah lov wu? / cf. Wu lov Sarah?
{} love who {} {} who love {}
"Who does Sarah love?" / "Who loves Sarah?"

Passive Sentence

In Unish, the passive voice, which tells the story with the object's voice, presents the verb in the form of ‘be + [verb]ed’. To present the person or object performing the action, ‘by + person or object performing the action’ is used in the objective form after the verb or at the end of the sentence.

I lov Susan. / Susan be loved (by i).
I love {} → {} be loved by me
"I love Susan." / "Susan is loved (by me)."

Personal Pronoun

In Unish, there is no gender distinction in pronouns., and the plural form of a pronoun is created by attaching an “-s” to its singular form.

	Singular	Plural
1st-person	i	we
2nd-person	u	ue
3rd-person	he/she/it	dey

A plural personal pronoun is obtained by attaching the suffix “–s” to a singular pronoun. The plural forms of all nouns are made simply by attaching that suffix to their singular forms.

== Vocabulary ==
The Research Team at Sejong University claims that, as the number of developed lexical items has exceeded 9,600, the lexical inventory of Unish provides a sufficient base for everyday conversation. New words are also under constant development for utilization within the context of various speaking and writing topics.

Unish vocabulary is derived from fifteen languages: English, Spanish, Portuguese, Italian, French, German, Russian, Korean, Chinese, Japanese, Arabic, Hindi, Greek, Latin and Esperanto. Words are selected from among multiple terms borrowed from these languages, in accordance with seven criteria: commonality, short word-length, diversity, distinctiveness, simplicity, cultural priority, compounding.

== Sample Text ==
The following short story—with an accompanying Unish translation—is extracted from Aesop's Fables.

English

The Geese and the Cranes. Some geese and cranes were feeding together in the same field, when a bird-catcher suddenly came to them. Since the cranes were slim and light, they could fly right off and escape the bird-catcher’s nets. The geese, however, weighed down by their fat, could not take off so easily and were all captured.

Unish Translation

Guss e krans. Som guss e krans beed fiding junt in same fild, when tori-kachor sudnli komed to dey. Koz krans beed slim e lite, dey kaned flai skoro e eskaped tori-kachor’s nets. But guss non kaned eskap izli e al es kaptur koz dey es overpeso.
