= A Man Alone (Star Trek: Deep Space Nine) =

- Star Trek: Deep Space Nine episode
- Episode no.: Season 1 Episode 4
- Directed by: Paul Lynch
- Story by: Gerald Sanford; Michael Piller
- Teleplay by: Michael Piller
- Production code: 403
- Original air date: January 18, 1993

Guest appearances
- Max Grodénchik as Rom; Aron Eisenberg as Nog; Rosalind Chao as Keiko O'Brien; Edward Laurence Albert as Zayra; Peter Vogt as Bajoran #1; Stephen James Carver as Ibudan; Tom Klunis as Lamonay S; Scott Trost as Bajoran Officer; Patrick Cupo as Bajoran Man; Kathryn Graf as Bajoran Woman; Hana Hatae as Molly O'Brien; Diana Cignoni as Dabo Girl; Judi Durand as Cardassian Computer Voice

Episode chronology
| ← Previous "Past Prologue" | Next → "Babel" |
- Star Trek: Deep Space Nine season 1

"A Man Alone" is the fourth episode of the American science fiction television series Star Trek: Deep Space Nine.

Set in the 24th century, the series follows the adventures on Deep Space Nine, a space station located near a stable wormhole between the Alpha and Gamma quadrants of the Milky Way Galaxy, near the planet Bajor, as the Bajorans recover from a brutal decades-long occupation by the imperialistic Cardassians. This episode focuses on Deep Space Nine's security chief Odo, a shapeshifter of unknown origin; in this episode, he is framed for the murder of a smuggler.

The episode aired in broadcast syndication on January 18, 1993.

== Plot ==
Odo has become worried at the number of new people arriving at Deep Space Nine due to the newly discovered wormhole. While talking with Quark in his bar, Odo observes a man he recognizes and demands he leave the station. The man refuses and the two get into a fight that is broken up by station commander Benjamin Sisko. Odo explains to Sisko that the man is Ibudan, who was a smuggler of goods to Bajorans during the Cardassian Occupation. Though considered a hero by some, Odo states that Ibudan let a young girl die when her parents could not afford the smuggled goods, and later killed a Cardassian officer. He has since gone free after the end of the Occupation. Sisko warns Odo that he cannot take action against Ibudan without any evidence of a crime being committed.

Later, Ibudan is found dead in one of Quark's holosuites. One of Ibudan's friends reports to Sisko and Major Kira that Ibudan was afraid Odo would kill him. No DNA is found at the scene of Ibudan's murder other than that of Ibudan and the officers investigating the crime; the general populace of the station start to become suspicious of Odo, whom they consider untrustworthy due to his unknown origin as a shapeshifter and his past association with the Cardassian regime. Sisko temporarily relieves Odo of duty as head of security. Dr. Bashir discovers that Ibudan was performing medical experiments on a strange material in his quarters despite having no training as a doctor or scientist.

The crowds on the station become more hostile to Odo, who is forced to hide in his office to avoid a mob forming outside. Bashir suddenly arrives with new evidence: Ibudan's medical sample has started growing into a clone of Ibudan. Sisko, Bashir and Odo determine that the murdered Ibudan was also another clone, set up to incriminate Odo. They discover the real Ibudan hiding on the station, and Odo arrests him for the murder of his clone, but receives no apologies from the inhabitants of the station.

In a side plot, DS9's operations chief Miles O'Brien struggles to help his wife Keiko O'Brien get used to living on the station, where she is unable to follow her interests. She decides to start a school to teach the children residing on the station.

== Production ==
This episode was filmed before the previous episode, but aired after it. Director Paul Lynch had previously directed five episodes of Star Trek: The Next Generation.

This marks the first appearance of Rosalind Chao as Keiko O'Brien on Star Trek: Deep Space Nine. This was the second appearance of Max Grodénchik but the first time he was credited as "Rom". In the pilot episode he was credited only as "Ferengi Pit Boss".

== Reception ==
"A Man Alone" first aired on January 18, 1993. It received a Nielsen rating of 13.0 percent, placing third in its timeslot.

In 2013, Tor.com's Keith DeCandido gave the episode a rating of 2 out of 10, writing, "There are moments here and there—the conversation between Sisko and Dax at the beginning is a good one, likewise Sisko reminiscing about Curzon to Bashir, and Rene Auberjonois's performance is superb—but ultimately, the episode just fails on almost every level."

In 2012, The A.V. Club's Zack Handlen praised René Auberjonois's portrayal of Odo, but criticized the episode as cliché, writing it was "not awful, but it's not good, either". He felt the episode had a "purpose" and established the nature of life aboard the space station, and considered Keiko's storyline to be the best plot line in the episode.

In 2019, Tor.com noted this as an "essential" for the character of Odo, remarking how it established him as isolated from the rest of the crew.

== Home video release ==
"Past Prologue" was released with "A Man Alone" on September 24, 1996 on LaserDisc in the United States.

On February 8, 1997 this episode was released on LaserDisc in Japan as part of the half-season box set 1st Season Vol. 1. This included episodes from "Emissary" to "Move Along Home" with both English and Japanese audio tracks.

The first home media release of the episode was on VHS cassette in the United States on September 10, 1996. It was part of the initial launch of cassettes by Paramount Home Video which saw the first six episodes released and was on a single episode cassette.

This episode was released in 2017 on DVD with the complete series box set, which had 176 episodes over 48 discs. It was released on DVD as part of the season one box set on June 3, 2003.
