= Solresol =

Constructed language

- Solfège: Sol-Re-Sol
- Created by: François Sudre
- Date: 1827
- Purpose: constructed languages: auxiliary language, a priori; musical language; Solresol
- Writing system: Solresol script; solfège; musical notation; visible spectrum
- Signed forms: Signed staff notation; tonic sol-fa signs by John Curwen
- Sources: a priori

Language codes
- ISO 639-3: qso (local use)
- Glottolog: None
- IETF: art-x-solresol

Solresol (Solfège: Sol-Re-Sol), originally called Langue universelle (lit. 'Universal language') and then Langue musicale universelle ('Universal musical language'), is a musical constructed language devised by French music teacher and composer Jean-François Sudre (1787–1862), beginning in 1817. His book defining it, Langue Musicale Universelle, was published posthumously in 1866, though he had already been publicizing it for some years. Solresol enjoyed a brief spell of popularity in the latter half of the 19^{th} century and was sponsored by such figures as Victor Hugo, Alphonse de Lamartine, Alexander von Humboldt and Napoleon III, culminating with Boleslas Gajewski's publication of Grammaire du Solresol in 1902.

Today, there exist small communities of Solresol enthusiasts scattered across the world.

== Evolution ==
There are multiple versions of Solresol, each with minor differences. The three primary variations still in circulation—Sudre, Gajewski and "Modern"—mostly differ in various vocabulary elements, while agreeing largely on the grammar.

Sudre created the language, and thus his version deserves the title of being the original version of Solresol.

Vincent Gajewski, a Parisian professor, popularized the language as the president of the Central Committee for the Study and Advancement of Solresol, which was founded in 1869 by Sudre's widow, Joséphine, to further promote his work. Boleslas Gajewski, Vincent's son and himself a professor, formalized the grammar and authored the definitive work on the language: Grammaire du Solrésol (French for 'Grammar of Solresol'). This is the most publicised version of Solresol, thanks to the translation to English by Stephen L. Rice from 1997, with a sizable amount of the vocabulary changed from the original, as well as some of the grammar. One example is the word fasol, defined as "here" in Sudre's dictionary, but "why?" in Gajewski's.

The third is an unofficial version developed over time by the community, dubbed "Modern Solresol". It uses Sudre's version as a base, with tweaks to the grammar and vocabulary, such as changing the definitions of sisol and sila from meaning "Sir" and "Young man", to an honorifics system inspired by what is used in Japanese; both are gender-neutral titles, one to be respectful, and one to be affectionate.

Gajewski's publication brought various additions that don't conflict with the original version of the language, such as various new methods of communication, including:

- a set of symbols
- using the seven colours of the rainbow, and
- using tonic sol-fa to sign the language

== Phonology ==
The seven conventional notes, colors, syllables, numerals, and glyphs used to convey solresol phonemes

Solresol can be communicated by using any seven distinct items, with a maximum of five per word. Statistically, these combinations yield seven one-syllable words, 49 of two syllables, 336 of three, 2,268 of four and 9,072 of five, for a total of 11,732 possible primary words. The main method of communication is by using the seven solfège syllables (a form of solmization), which may be accented, lengthened or repeated. The simplest way to use these syllables is to speak them as if they were regular syllables.

Due to predating the IPA, there are no specific pronunciation rules beyond the standard readings of the solfège. Due to each syllable being fairly distinct, they may be pronounced in almost any way the reader prefers.

Sudre outlined a way of transcribing the phonetics of French (and thus many other languages) into Solresol, primarily used for proper nouns. Using common pronunciations as given by the likes of Wiktionary, it is possible to reconstruct a table of sounds using the modern IPA.

Due to the paucity of syllables, it is necessary to leave a brief pause between words so that each word remains clearly separate. As noted by Boleslas Gajewski: "one should take great care to pause after every word; this slight pause is necessary to separate the words, so that the listener does not become confused".

== Vocabulary ==
In Solresol morphology, each word is divided into categories of either meaning or function, where longer words are generally more specific. Words are differentiated by three main characteristics: the initial syllable, word length, and whether it has a pair of repeated syllables.

Words of one and two syllables are used for pronouns and common particles, and those with repeated syllables are tenses.

Words of three syllables are devoted to words used frequently (at the time of Solresol's creation). The ones which include repeating syllables are reserved for "numbers, the months of the year, the days of the week, and temperature [weather conditions]", e.g. redodo "one", remimi "two" (according to Gajewski).

Words of four syllables fall into various themed categories. For example, words beginning with 'sol', which include no repeating syllables, have meanings related to arts or sciences (e.g. soldoredo, "art"; solmiredo, "acoustic"). However, if words that are four syllables long have a pair of repeated syllables, their meanings relate to sickness or medicine (e.g. solsolredo, "migraine"; solreresol, "smallpox").

More specifically, the classes without repeating syllables, are:

1. do: man, his body and spirit, intellectual faculties, qualities and nourishment;
2. re: clothing, the house, housekeeping and the family
3. mi: man's actions and his flaws
4. fa: the countryside, travel, war, the sea
5. sol: fine arts and sciences
6. la: industry and commerce
7. si: the city, government and administration

With repeating syllables, the same syllables yield:

1. do: religion
2. re: construction and various trades
3. mi: prepositions, adverbial phrases and isolated adverbs
4. fa: sickness
5. sol: sickness (cont.)
6. la: industry and commerce (as in the non-repeating type)
7. si: justice, the magistracy, and the courts

Finally, combinations of five syllables designate animals, plants and minerals.

By default, all animate nouns and pronouns imply that they are of male sex. To differentiate the female sex, a bar, hyphen or macron is added to the final syllable of the corresponding article or the word itself. In speech, this is indicated by repeating the vowel of the syllable, with a glottal stop separating the repeated vowel from the rest of the word.

However, in modern translations, pronouns do not change depending on gender. Instead, they are simply translated into English as neutral pronouns; it and they.

A unique feature of Solresol is that meanings can be inverted by reversing the syllables in words. For instance fala means good or tasty, and lafa means bad. Interruptions in the logical order of words in each category are usually caused by these reversible words.

misol: "good" / solmi: "bad"

domisol: "God" / solmido: "Devil"

However, not all words are reversible in this sense, such as dorefare meaning neck, and refaredo meaning wardrobe, which are obviously not opposites.

The following table shows the words of up to two syllables from Gajewski's dictionary:

2^{nd} syll. 1^{st} syll.	None	-do	-re	-mi	-fa	-sol	-la	-si/-ti
Do-	no, not, neither, nor	(past)	I, me	you [sg]	he	self, oneself	one, someone	other
Re-	and, as well as	my, mine	(pluperfect)	your, yours [sg]	his	our, ours	your, yours [pl]	their
Mi-	or, or even	for, in order to/that	who, which (rel. pron.), that (conj.)	(future)	whose, of which	well (adv.)	here/there is, behold	good evening/night
Fa-	to	what?	with, jointly	this, that	(cond.)	why, for what reason	good, tasty, delectable	much, very, extremely
Sol-	if	but	in, within	wrong, ill (adv.)	because	(imperative)	perpetually, always, without end	thank, thanks
La-	the	nothing, no one, nobody	by	here, there	bad	never, at no time	(present participle)	of
Si-/Ti-	yes, okay, gladly, agreed	the same (thing)	each, every	good morning/afternoon	little, scarcely	mister, sir	young man, bachelor	(passive participle)

The definite article has different forms for the nominative, genitive and dative cases, or, in English, for "the", "to the", and "of the": 'la', 'fa' and 'lasi', respectively.

== Grammar ==
Apart from stress and length, Solresol words are not inflected. To keep sentences clear, especially with the possibility of information loss while communicating, certain parts of speech follow a strict word order.

Adjectives always follow the noun they modify.
Indirect objects always come after the verb.
Examples given throughout the original documentation hint at a subject–verb–object word order, however, it shouldn't matter as long as the sentence remains simple and clear.
Tenses always precede verbs.

To make a word plural, an acute accent is added above the last syllable, which in speech is pronounced by lengthening the last letter of said syllable. Examples of how to mark plural masculine and feminine words:

resimire brother, resimirē/resimire-e sister
resimiré brothers, resimiréē/resimiré-e sisters

This only affects the first word in a noun phrase. That is, it only affects a noun when the noun is alone, as above. If the word is accompanied by a grammatical particle (la, fa or lasi), the particle will take the gender and or number marking instead:

la resimire [the] brother, lā/la-a resimire [the] sister
lá resimire [the] brothers, láā/lá-a resimire [the] sisters

Parts of speech (as well as more specific definitions for certain words) are derived from verbs by placing a circumflex above one of the syllables in writing, and by pronouncing said syllable with rinforzando (sudden emphasis or crescendo). With the accent placed on the first syllable, the word becomes a noun. In four-syllable words, accentuating the second syllable creates an agent noun. The penultimate syllable produces an adjective, and the last creates an adverb. For example,

midofa to prefer, mîdofa preference, midôfa preferable, midofâ preferably
resolmila to continue, rêsolmila continuation, resôlmila one who continues, resolmîla continual, resolmilâ continually

On computers using keyboard layouts without the circumflex accent, the syllable may either be printed using capital letters, or a caret placed between letters of a syllable or after a syllable. Due to the grammar and word order of Solresol, distinguishing parts of speech aren't usually required to understand the sentence.

The various tense-and-mood particles are the double syllables, as given in vocabulary above. In addition, according to Gajewski, passive verbs are formed with faremi between this particle and the verb. The subjunctive is formed with mire before the pronoun. The negative do only appears once in the clause, before the word it negates.

The word fasi before a noun or adjective is augmentative; after it is superlative. Sifa is the opposite (diminutive):

fala good, fasi fala very good, fala fasi excellent, the best; sifa fala okay, fala sifa not very good (and similarly with lafa bad)
sisire wind, fasi sisire gale, sisire fasi cyclone; sifa sisire breeze, sisire sifa movement of air

== Questions ==
Questions in Solresol are not given much attention in the original documentation, nor do they have many examples.

Sudre's publication includes three examples of interrogative sentences:

Is your health good? – Redofafa?
Will you go to the countryside this year? – Fadoremi?
Will you go to the theatre tonight? – Soldoremi?

To make this an affirmative statement, one adds the personal pronoun afterwards:

My health is good. – Redofafa dore.
I will go to the countryside this year. – Fadoremi dore.
I will go to the theatre tonight. – Soldoremi dore.

Gajewski instead places the subject of the sentence after the verb instead of before the verb, a construction common in European languages. Some examples are:

Am I? – Faremi dore?
Does he understand? – Falafa dofa?
Are you learning? – Sidosi domi?

In all versions of the language, there are words four syllables long, repeated "Mi" section of the dictionary which includes some common questions, such as:

Miladodo? – To what extent/degree?
Milarere? – Well?
Misirere? – Who is it?

== Solresol script ==
The symbols of Solresol

The script used in Solresol consists of seven unique symbols, each representing one of the seven "notes". For example, "Do" is a circle, and "Sol" is a horizontal line.

Words of Solresol are formed by connecting the symbols in the order they appear in the word. Double notes are represented by crossing the symbol.

Some basic words of Solresol

== Other attributes ==
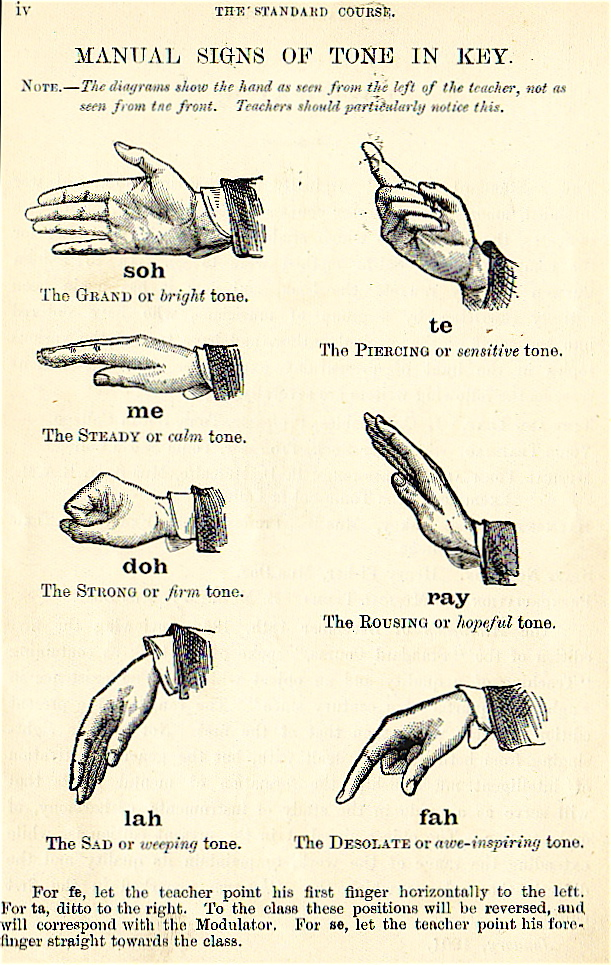
Depiction of John Curwen's solfège hand signs used in tonic sol-fa. This version includes the tonal tendencies and interesting titles for each tone.

- Impartial and relatively simple
- Integrated systems (sign language, colors, etc.) for most impairments, immediately operative without special learning
- Fast learning success for the illiterate (only seven syllables or signs or ten letters to know and to recognize)
- Very simple but effective system for differentiating functions of words in sentences

Using the tonic sol-fa system by John Curwen, Solresol can also be signed.

== Further developments ==
Another way of using Solresol is called ses, developed by C. George Boeree. Using it, the notes are given a representative consonant and vowel (or diphthong). The most basic words use the vowel alone, while all others use more complex syllable structure.

- do ⇒ p / o
- re ⇒ k / e
- mi ⇒ m / i
- fa ⇒ f / a
- sol ⇒ s / u
- la ⇒ l / au
- ti ⇒ t / ai

In this way, one can write or pronounce words such as this one:

sol-sol-re-do ⇒ suko (cvcv) – migraine

Because the plural and feminine forms of words in Solresol are indicated by stress or length of sounds, ses uses pau (some) or fai (many) to indicate the plural, and mu (well) to indicate the feminine when necessary.

== Encoding ==
A request for an ISO 639-3 language code, tentatively suggested to be sud, was made to SIL Global on August 28, 2017, but was rejected on January 23, 2018.

Solresol has been assigned the codes qso and art-x-solresol in the ConLang Code Registry.

The seven basic symbols have been proposed to be registered in the ConScript Unicode Registry.

== Sample texts ==
Article 1 of the Universal Declaration of Human Rights in English
All human beings are born free and equal in dignity and rights. They are endowed with reason and conscience and should act towards one another in a spirit of brotherhood.

The same text in Solresol
Siré misolredo faremi doredore domisimi re misóla, solfalafá dósila re réfasi. Dófa faremi remila fare dômilafa re dôfasifa, re fafa fasolfa midolǎ fare dômisola lasi sîmisila.

Represented using ses Solresol
Sé muro fem pepe omúm e múl, salá ósau e éfai. Óf fem ril fe ômauf e ôfaif, e fa fuf ipǎu fe ômul lai âimail.

== See also ==
- Musical language
- Solfège
- Tonic sol-fa
- Voyage to Faremido
- Ro language
