= Jean Pirro =

Linguist

- Born: 24 December 1813; Woustviller, France
- Died: 3 February 1886 (aged 72); Saint-Dizier, France
- Occupation: linguist
- Known for: Inventor of Universalglot
- Children: André Pirro

Jean Pirro (24 December 1813 – 3 February 1886) was a French linguist who in 1868 invented the "universal language", Universalglot. He was born in Woustviller, France. He was also the father of André Pirro.

He died on 3 February 1886 in Saint-Dizier, France.

== See also ==
- Constructed languages
