= Universalglot =

Constructed language created in 1868

- Created by: Jean Pirro
- Date: 1868
- Purpose: Constructed language: International auxiliary language; Universalglot
- Writing system: Latin, with one letter from the Greek alphabet
- Sources: vocabulary from Romance and Germanic languages

Language codes
- ISO 639-3: qgu (local use). Also used for Wulguru.
- Glottolog: None
- IETF: art-x-univglot

Universalglot is an a posteriori international auxiliary language published by the French linguist Jean Pirro in 1868 in Tentative d'une langue universelle, Enseignement, grammaire, vocabulaire. Preceding Volapük by a decade and Esperanto by nearly 20 years, Universalglot has been called the first "complete auxiliary-language system based on the common elements in national languages". Pirro gave it more than 7,000 basic words and numerous prefixes, enabling the development of a very extensible vocabulary.

In his book describing his own language project Novial, Otto Jespersen praised the language, writing that it is "one to which I constantly recur with the greatest admiration, because it embodies principles which were not recognized till much later". The magazine Cosmoglotta for the auxiliary language Interlingue (then known as Occidental) also praised the language in 1931 for its readability and analysis of international words (in particular the suffix -ion) and regretted that its creator had been forgotten in contrast with the creators of Esperanto and Volapük:

Monuments have been erected to the glory of Zamenhof and the name Schleyer has been engraved in marble. Their precursor and master, Pirro, has been honored - with oblivion.

== Linguistic properties ==
=== Orthography ===
The Universalglot alphabet contains 27 letters. It uses 24 of the 26 letters of the ISO basic Latin alphabet, "w" and "y" are not used, and has three additional letters "œ", "ü" and "σ" which comes from the Greek alphabet.

Universalglot alphabet
Upper case	A	B	C	D	E	F	G	H	I	J	K	L	M	N	O	Œ	P	Qu	R	S	Σ	T	U	Ü	V	X	Z
Lower case	a	b	c	d	e	f	g	h	i	j	k	l	m	n	o	œ	p	qu	r	s	σ	t	u	ü	v	x	z
Phoneme (IPA)	a	b	t͡s	d	e	f	ɡ	h/∅ (Note: Pirro says that <h> should be "always aspired as in héros" however in modern French <h> at the beginning of "héros" is silent)	i	j	k	l	m	n	o	ø	p	kw	ʁ (Note: Pirro provides word "ravir" as an example for <r>, so technically <r> in Universalglot should be realized as [ʁ])	s	ʃ	t	u	y	v	ks	z

=== Word classes ===
==== Nouns ====
Nouns (substantives) are invariable except for the feminine form, which is formed by using suffix -in e.g. kaval - 'horse', kavalin - 'mare'. All words can be used as nouns with the help of an article.

==== Adjectives ====
Adjectives like in English and unlike French, are completely invariable e.g. (singular): el old man, el old manin. e.g. (plural): Li old man, Li old manin. An adjective can be formed from any word, by adding suffix -il, e.g. dai 'day', daili 'daily', amen 'to love', amli 'lovable'. If several adjectives are derived from the same root, -li usually indicates something passive. So to mark an action, the ending -iv is used, e.g. akten 'to act', aktli 'doable', aktiv 'active'.

==== Articles ====
There are two definite articles:

Singular: el (the)
Plural: li (the)

And one indefinite:

un (a/an)

If a noun doesn't have an article preceding it, it will be considered plural: I hab kaval - I have horses.

==== Verbs ====
The verbs all share the same easy conjugation:

Conjugation	Suffix	Example	English translation
Infinitive	-en	esen	to be
Past tense	-ed	esed	was/were
Present tense	-e	ese	am/is/are
Future tense	-rai	esrai	will be
Conditional	-rais	esrais	would be
Imperative	No suffix	es!	be!
Present participle	-ant	esant	being
Past participle	-ed	esed	been

Transitive verbs, such as loben (to praise) also have passive forms:

esen lobed (to be praised)
i ese lobed (I am praised)
i esed lobed (I was praised)
i esrai lobed (I will be praised)
i esrais lobed (I would be praised)
i esrai esed lobed (I will have been praised)
i esrais esed lobed (I would have been praised)
es lobed! (be praised!)

Passive verbs use esen for the perfect (have been). All other verbs use haben.

And reflexives:

se loben (to praise oneself)
i lobe me (I praise myself)
i lobed me (I praised myself)
i lobrai me (I will praise myself)
i lobrais me (I would praise myself)

==== Adverbs ====
- Adverb of place - da 'there', di 'here', fern 'far', pertot 'everywhere', post 'from behind', retro 'backward', sub 'down', up 'up', vo 'where?'
- Adverbs of manner - alterlit 'otherwise', hastlit 'quickly', insamel 'together', oft 'often', rarlit 'rarely', re 'again', so 'thus/so'
- Adverbs of mode - certlit 'certainly', ies 'yes', non 'no', potlit 'maybe' (possibly), villit 'gladly' (willingly)
- Adverbs of time - alor 'so/then', altervolt 'formerly', ankor 'still', bald 'soon', ditdai 'today', heri 'yesterday', jam 'already', kras 'tomorrow', nonk 'never', nun 'now', postdit 'next/then', 'primlit 'first', semper 'always'
- Adverbs of quantity - admindest 'at least', ben 'well', kom 'how', mal 'badly', mind 'few', molt 'many', prox 'almost/around', quant 'how many', sat 'enough', self 'self/even', talit 'that/so much', tant 'as much', totlit 'immediately', trop 'too', unlit 'only', vix 'scarcely'

==== Prepositions ====
ad 'to', adkaus 'because of', de 'of', ex 'from', in 'in', inter 'among', kon 'with', kontra 'against', kontravil 'despite', ob 'in front of', per 'by', post 'after / according to', pre 'before', pro 'for', prox 'beside', retro 'behind', sin 'without', sub 'below', til 'until', tra 'across', um 'around', up 'on', uper 'over'

==== Numerals ====
un (1), du (2), tri (3), quat (4), quint (5), sex (6), sept (7), okt (8), nov (9), dec (10)

11=undec, 12=dudec, 13=tridec etc.
20=duta, 30=trita, etc.
21=dutaun, 22=dutadu, 23=dutatri etc.

cent (100), mil (1000), milion (1,000,000)

El prim (the first), el duli (the second), el trili (the third) etc. el ultim (the last)
primlit (firstly), dulit (secondly), trilit (thirdly) etc.
1/2 = un midli, 3/4 = tri quatli

==== Pronouns ====
i (I), me (me, object—direct, indirect, of preposition), men (my, mine; pl. meni "meni bibel" my books)
tu (you, singular), te (you, singular/object), ten (your(s) singular; pl. teni)
il (he/she/it), eil (him/her/it, object), sen (his/her(s)/its; pl. seni)
nos (we), enos (us, object) nor (our(s); pl. nori)
vos (you, plural), evos (you, plural object), vor (your(s), plural; pl. vori): vor bibel (your (pl.) book), vori bibel (your (pl.) books)
ili (they), eili (them, object), lor (their(s); pl. lori)

Interrogative and relative pronouns: ke (who(m), what), kei (pl. of ke)

alter, alteri 'another, others'
jed 'each'
meri 'several'
nul, nuli 'none'
on 'one/you/they'
self, selfi 'oneself, ones selves'
tal, tali 'such a one, such ones'
tot, toti 'all of it, all of them'
un 'one, someone', uni 'some'

==== Conjunctions ====
e 'and', kar 'because', ma 'but', o 'or'

den 'therefore', ed 'also', ferner 'furthermore', finitlit 'finally', indit 'however', kontra 'on the contrary', nonminder 'nonetheless', sekutlit 'consequently', uper 'in addition'

alorke 'when' (at that time), benke 'though', exke 'since', inditke 'during', ke 'that', kom 'as', perke 'because', postke 'following, proke 'so that', preke 'preceding', quan 'when' (at which time?), si 'indeed', so 'so that', tilke 'until'

=== Affixes ===
List of affixes which haven't been mentioned before.

affix	meaning	examples
an-	negation	afidli (unaithful)
arki-	superior degree	arkiduk (archduke)
dis-	decay, extinction, separation, deprivation, defect	disparen (to separate), disnexen (to detach) discrediten (to discredit)
mis-	bad, mal-	mistrakten (to mistreat), misprisen (to despise), misfiden (to mistrust)
re-	repetition, reciprocity, movement backwards	redikten (to repeat), renuoven (to renew), retornen (to return), rekusen (to reject), resisten (to resist)
-iet	forms diminutives	kavalietin (filly)
-er	marks the agent of a noun	el vorker (the worker), el denker (the thinker), el parler (the speaker)
-tol	instrument	rastol (razor)
-stan	place	kavalstan, (stable)
-al/el	uncertain (Note: Pirro says that those suffixes are used in "certain" words but he doesn't provide any further informations)	vokal, (vowel), detel, (thimble)

Borrowings from Latin keeps same suffixes, however they are optional, so, one can say administratnes or administratiom

=== Syntax ===
Pirro provided no specific rules that everyone should follow; he said, "Everyone is free to follow the usages of his own language". However he recommended that:

- French du, de la, des (some) shouldn't be translated
- Use di or da, when referring to "here" or "there" in context: Ese vor pater in haus? (Is your father at home?) - il ese/ or (yes he is (here/there))
- Object pronouns usually go after the verb, e.g.: habe tu ten vest? (Do you have your clothes?) I habe eil (I have it)
- For "there is/are", use Il ese / ili ese, e.g.: Ese gent up el merk? (Is there anyone at the market?) Ili/il ese da (There is)
- "Of", "to", ... followed by an infinitive, are not usually translated. However, if clarity requires it, they can be rendered by a preposition; e.g. ad, pro, ex, de, etc.
- Neither...nor = non... non, e.g. I habe non brod non vin (I have neither bread nor wine)
- to need, have to - deben
- Adjectives usually precede the noun
- "Of which, of whom; about which, about whom" is rendered as de ke, de kei, or ex ke, ex kei.
- You can form compound words, in which case the determiner word is always placed before the determined word, e.g. un not de bank/un banknot (a banknote).

=== Special word lists ===
septin (week):
Lundai, Mardai, Erdai, Jovdai, Vendai, Samdai, Diodai = un septin
Li mens (months):
Januar, Februar, Mars, April, Mai, Juni, Juli, August, September, October, November, December = un jar

== Examples of texts in Universalglot ==
=== Leter de grat (thankyou letter) ===
Men senior,
I grate vos pro el servnes ke vos habe donated ad me. Kred, men senior, ke in un simli fal vos pote konten up me.
Adcept el adsekurantnes de men kordli amiknes.

=== Konversatsion ===
Ben dai, Meni senior, i ese inkanted reinkontra evos; i habe videt evos in London, e ditdai nos finde enos in Skotland. dikt me ex ke land vos ese.
I habe perkursed el Holland, i habe visited seni principal citad, li Hollander ese molt amatli gent, ili ese mild e vorkli, lor konmerk ese molt extended, on finde Hollander in toti land e pertot ili ese amated e prised.
Un ex enos ese ruser e du ese italier e el quatli ese deutsch; ma nos pote toti parlen insamel, den nos parle el universal glot.
Si nos vile venten in nor hostel, vos etrai (va mangear) kon enos, vos findrai da un ben tabel e ben knmer, fir e ben bet.

== Excerpt from Mamud e sen minister ==
„Ke Dio adkorde un lang viv ad el sultan Mamud; so lang ke il governe enos, nos manku nonk (nequende) ruined dorf.
Ili kontinuated, dikted el visir in terment (in fine), goderant se per el desolatsion, ke, kom ili pretende, propagate se mer e mer jed dai. Ma, kom tu varted, i viled non resten mer lang, den i denked tu poted esen anpatant (impatient) e tu vise (tu save) kom i trepide anplesen (desplacer) te.
El stori dikted, ke el sultan esed exmoved per dit fabel, ke il rekonstrukted li citad e dorf; redukted el tribut, ex ke el land esed uperladed (supercargut); e, ex dit temp, il konsulted ei ben de sen popel."
