= Karolina Gajewska =

Polish politician

member of Sejm 2005-2007
- In office 25 September 2005 – 2007

Personal details
- Born: 31 July 1972 (age 53)
- Party: Law and Justice

Karolina Gajewska (born 31 July 1972 in Działdowo) is a Polish politician. She was elected to the Sejm on 25 September 2005, getting 4784 votes in 34 Elbląg district as a candidate from the Law and Justice list.

== See also ==
- Members of Polish Sejm 2005-2007
