= Joseph Schipfer =

- Born: 8 April 1761; Ransbach
- Died: 27 January 1843 (aged 81); Niederwalluf
- Occupations: Landowner and wine producer
- Known for: Inventor of Communicationssprache

Joseph Schipfer (8 April 1761 – 27 January 1843) was a German landowner and wine producer, today mostly known for his creation of the language Communicationssprache. He was born in Ransbach.

== Biography ==
In his letter of 20 February 1840, titled "General Call to the Compassionate Humanity", Schipfer describes the suffering of the French inhabitants near the rivers Rhône and Saône and also provides a brochure on his "General Communication or World language (in German: Allgemeine Communications- oder Weltsprache)". Other brochures dealt with grammar and teaching materials for adults and children from 12 to 14 years of age.

In the same letter he wrote a description of how the live burial could be avoided and also made a proposal for general charity and that the profits from sales of his Communicationssprache materials be donated to the above-mentioned French populated areas. He died on 27 January 1843 in Niederwalluf.
