= Spocanian =

Spocanian (Dutch: Spokaans) is a constructed language, created by the Dutch linguist Rolandt Tweehuysen. Unlike such invented languages as Esperanto, Spocanian was never intended to be used for international communication; instead, it serves as the language of Spocania, a fictional island group in the Atlantic Ocean, southwest of Ireland.

Spocania and Spocanian are typical examples of early geofiction, predating the Internet. Tweehuysen started working on them when he was still a boy, in 1962. Over the years, they have attracted much press, radio and television attention in the Netherlands. Two travel books about the country have been published. To date, Spocania is one of the most elaborated fictional cultures ever published.

In its fictional setting, Spocanian is a member of the Atlantic language family. As a constructed language, it can be classified as a highly naturalistic a priori language: apart from loan words from European languages, the basic vocabulary and the grammar are unique. Grammar itself is full of "bizarre characteristics":

"Spocanian has not only many rules but also many exceptions to the rules. These exceptions can sometimes be made sense of only by those who know the centuries' old history of the language."

With a dictionary of over 25,000 entries, Spocanian is one of the most elaborated artistic languages ever created.

== Bibliography ==
- Rolandt Tweehuysen: 'Uit in SPOKANIË nooit weg - een reisverslag.' Gralkrich, Pelger & Mardant, 1982. With gramophones record, drawing and maps. ISBN 90-216-0515-5
- Rolandt Tweehuysen: 'Spokanië: Berref'. Travel guide. Uitgeverij Dominicus. ISBN 90-257-3189-9
