= Communicationssprache =

International auxiliary language

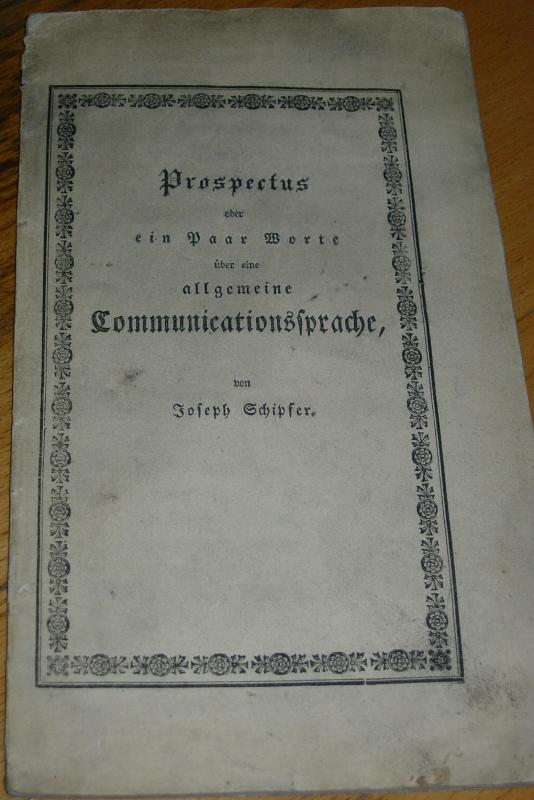
- Created by: Joseph Schipfer
- Date: 1836
- Setting and usage: International auxiliary language
- Purpose: Constructed language: International auxiliary language; Communicationssprache
- Sources: Most of the vocabulary and grammar from French, with some influences from Latin, English and German

Language codes
- ISO 639-3: None (mis)
- Glottolog: None
- IETF: art-x-commsspr

Communicationssprache is one of the earliest international auxiliary languages.

== Overview ==
It was created by Joseph Schipfer and first published in Wiesbaden.

This project is of historical interest for two reasons—first, it being based on French, but the inclusion of ⟨ä⟩, ⟨ö⟩, ⟨ü⟩ reflects the common view of the time that French is "a world language to some extent". A mere forty years later, in 1879, Volapük took English for basis. Second, Schipfer's project reflects a new conscience of greater possibilities of the international communication which appeared by the invention of the railway and steam ship. He even recommended that his project be used on these "new means of voyage".

== Grammar ==
Communicationssprache is based on (or a simplification of) French (see French orthography), making heavy (even exclusive) use of respelled French vocabulary, which Schipfer considered to be nearly universal among the educated classes of the world of his time. Silent letters were removed, one sound for one letter, circumflexes and diaereses were removed, graves to distinguish homographs were removed, the letter ⟨w⟩ was added (as in English), vowels ⟨e⟩ instead of ⟨é⟩, ⟨ä⟩ instead of French ⟨è⟩, ⟨ö⟩ instead of French ⟨eu⟩ and ⟨œ(u)⟩, ⟨u⟩ instead of French ⟨ou⟩, ⟨ü⟩ instead of French ⟨u⟩, ⟨oa⟩ instead of French ⟨oi⟩, the inclusion of macrons for long vowels, and one sound per letter.

Although the final orthography can be read and spelled easily due to this one-sound-per-letter principle, the actual conversion of French words is inconsistent, being based sometimes on pronunciation and sometimes on orthography, for example word-final silent ⟨c⟩ is deleted, as in Estoma "stomach" from estomac, but silent ⟨h⟩ is kept, as in Homa "man" from homme.

Some of its characteristics are:

- No articles.
- Invariable adjectives.
- Comparatives in -ior and -iost.
- Adverbs formed by adding -ly to adjectives.
- Possessive pronouns in -a.
- Infinitives in -er.
- Nouns were declined.
- Capitalization of nouns, as in German.

The declension of nouns works as follows, using Masona "house" as an example:

Nominative	Masona	a house
Nominative	Masonas	houses
Genitive	Masone	of a house
Genitive	Masones	of houses
Dative	Masoni	to a house
Dative	Masonis	to houses
Accusative	Masono	a house
Accusative	Masonos	houses
Vocative	o Masona	oh house
Vocative	o Masonos	oh houses
Ablative	Masonu	in a house
Ablative	Masonus	in houses

== Examples ==
=== Our Father prayer ===
No Pera, wia ete Cielu
ta Noma sanctiferii;
ta Royoma Ais arrivii;
ta volonta färerii
com Cielu änsi Terru.
Donne Ais noa Päno quotidien;
pardonne Ais noa offansos,
com pardonnas Aos offanding;
non permette que succombias tantationi;
mä delivre Aos malu.

=== Numbers from one to ten ===
1	2	3	4	5	6	7	8	9	10
una	dua	tria	quatra	quina	sesta	setta	otta	nona	dia

=== A Response to a Dear Friend ===
Communicationssprache: Cher Amia! Ei demanda mil Par donos, que no repondia ta obligeant Lettro dan tamsu a devea. Non puveia excuser tis Foto, si non puveia Eo assurer, que etia plusior moasos malad. Voala veritabel Coso ma silanse, Eo assurang, que sava etimer dan tu sa Etandu Priso tas Amitie et Bonte, wie Continuationo Eo most humbly pria. Rien subata avec plu Ardoru que occasiono, pur puver Ei donner Provos reel tis Paroles, Ei montrer par Effetos avec was respectfu, et Amitia eta, e restua Ei adonne. M. 28 Janvier 1839, ma most cher Amie, ta most devue Amia.

German: Theurer Freund! Ich bitte tausendmal um Nachsicht, daß ich Ihr sehr verbindliches Schreiben nicht zu gehöriger Zeit beantwortet habe. Diesen Fehler könnte ich nicht entschuldigen, wenn ich Ihnen nicht versichern könnte, daß ich mehrere Monate krank gewesen bin. Das ist die einzige Ursache meines langen Stillschweigens, wobei ich Sie zugleich versichere, daß ich den Werth Ihrer Freundschaft und Güte, um deren Fortsetzung ich unterthänig bitte, in ihrem ganzen Umfange zu schätzen weis. Ich wünsche nichts sehnlicher, als eine Gelegenheit zu haben, um Ihnen thätige Beweise dieser Aeußerung geben zu können, um Ihnen thätig zu zeigen, mit welcher hochachtungsvollen Freundschaft ich Ihnen ergeben bin und bleiben werde. M. d. 28. Jan. 1839, meines werthesten Freundes ergebenster Diener und Freund.

English: Dear friend! I am asking a thousand times for understanding that I haven't responded to your very binding letter in proper time. I could not excuse this mistake if I could not assure you that I have been ill for several months. That is the sole cause for my long silence, and I wish to assure you at the same time that I appreciate the worth of your friendship and goodness, the continuation of which I subserviently ask for, in its entirety. I wish for nothing more dearly than to have an opportunity to be able to give you active proof of this statement, in order to actively show you with what respectful friendship I am, and shall remain, devoted to you. Monday, 28 January 1839, most devoted servant and friend of my most valued friend

== Encoding ==
Communicationssprache has been assigned the codes qcs and art-x-commsspr in the ConLang Code Registry.

== Bibliography ==
- Joseph Schipfer, Prospectus oder ein Paar Worte über die, in der Idee zur Verhütung als scheintodt begraben zu werden, angekündigte allgemeine Communicationssprache, Wiesbaden 1836 (Google)
- Joseph Schipfer, Versuch einer Grammatik für eine allgemeine Communications- oder Weltsprache, Wiesbaden 1839 (LMU)
- The project received the code 417.4"1839” of the Montagu C. Butler Library
