= Sally Caves =

US science fiction writer and English professor

Sally Caves is the pen name of Sarah Higley, a science fiction writer and professor of English at the University of Rochester. She is best known for creating the Star Trek character Reginald Barclay.

== Star Trek ==
Caves wrote the Star Trek: The Next Generation episode "Hollow Pursuits", in which Reginald Barclay was introduced. She also co-authored the story of the Star Trek: Deep Space Nine episode "Babel".

== Teonaht ==
Caves is the creator of Teonaht, a notable constructed language.

== Bibliography ==
- Hildegard of Bingen's Unknown Language. Palgrave Macmillan, 2007.
- "Fetch Felix". The Magazine of Fantasy and Science Fiction, July 1991
- Ketamine, F&SF, March 1995
