= C. George Boeree =

American psychologist and creator of Lingua Franca Nova (1952–2021)

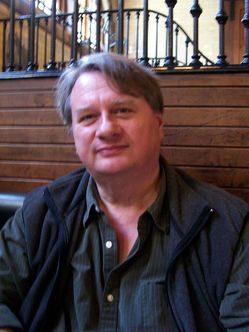
- Born: Cornelis George Boeree; January 15, 1952; Badhoevedorp, Netherlands
- Died: January 5, 2021 (aged 68); Shippensburg, Pennsylvania, U.S.
- Known for: Lingua Franca Nova
- Spouse: Judy Kovarik (m. 1972)
- Children: 3

Academic background
- Education: Pennsylvania State University (B.A.); Oklahoma State University (M.S., Ph.D.)

Academic work
- Discipline: Psychologist
- Institutions: Shippensburg University
- Main interests: Personality theory; History of psychology
- Website: webspace.ship.edu/cgboer

Cornelis George Boeree (January 15, 1952 – January 5, 2021) was a Dutch-born American psychologist at Shippensburg University, who specialized in personality theory and the history of psychology. He created the language Lingua Franca Nova.

== Life ==
Boeree was born in Badhoevedorp, Netherlands. He moved with his parents and brother to the United States in 1956 and grew up on Long Island, New York. He married Judy Kovarik in 1972 and had three daughters. He received his doctoral degree in 1980 from Oklahoma State University. He died on January 5, 2021, at his home in Shippensburg, Pennsylvania.

=== Works on psychology ===
Boeree was the author of the first online psychology texts, which he made available at no cost to students and other interested parties starting in 1997. They have been translated into German, Spanish, and Bulgarian. Two of his textbooks have been published, one on personality theories and one on the history of psychology.

=== Lingua Franca Nova ===
Boeree was also the inventor of the auxiliary language Lingua Franca Nova (ISO 639-3: lfn), which first appeared in 1998 on the Internet. It has its own Wikipedia (lfnwiki), and books have been translated into it. He was the coeditor of the Disionario de Lingua Franca Nova ("Lingua Franca Nova Dictionary").
