= Musical language =

Constructed language based on musical sounds

Musical languages are constructed languages based on musical sounds, which tend to incorporate articulation. Whistled languages are dependent on underlying spoken languages and are used in various cultures as a means for communication over distance, or as secret codes. The mystical concept of a language of the birds tries to connect the two categories, since some authors of musical a priori languages have speculated about a mystical or primeval origin of the whistled languages.

== Constructed musical languages ==
There are only a few language families as of now such as the Solresol language family, Moss language family, and Nibuzigu language family.

The Solresol family is a family of a posteriori languages (usually English) where a sequence of 7 notes of the western C-Major scale or the 12 tone chromatic scale are used as phonemes.

- Domila
- Eaiea
- Sarus
- Solresol
- Moss is a pidgin built out of melodic shapes.
- The Nıbuzıgu family

Kobaïan is a language constructed by Christian Vander of the band Magma, which uses elements of Slavic and Germanic languages, but is based primarily on 'sonorities, not on applied meanings'.

== Musically influenced languages ==
- Hymmnos

== In fiction ==
- Voyage to Faremido
- Close Encounters of the Third Kind
- The Moon Moth

== See also ==
- Tonal language
- Whistled language
