= Constructed language =

Intentionally devised human language

The Conlang Flag, a symbol of language construction created by subscribers to the CONLANG mailing list, which represents the Tower of Babel against a rising sun

A constructed language or conlang is any consciously designed language, typically invented by individual humans (or generated by computers), that is structurally similar to and inspired by natural human languages. As a relatively broad term, it typically includes subcategories like fictional, artificial, and engineered languages, while excluding formal computer languages. Designers of conlangs intentionally incorporate aspects that mirror ordinary natural languages, such as having their own distinct systems of phonology, grammar, orthography, and vocabulary. Interlinguistics includes the study of constructed languages.

== History ==
=== Ancient linguistic experiments ===
Grammatical speculation dates from classical antiquity; for instance, it appears in Plato's Cratylus in Hermogenes's contention that words are not inherently linked to what they refer to; that people apply "a piece of their own voice [...] to the thing".

Athenaeus tells the story of two figures, Dionysius of Sicily and Alexarchus:

- Dionysius of Sicily created neologisms like menandros 'virgin' (from menei 'waiting' and andra 'husband') for standard Greek parthenos; menekratēs 'pillar' (from menei 'it remains in one place' and kratei 'it is strong') for standard stulos; and ballantion 'javelin' (from balletai enantion 'thrown against someone') for standard akon.
- Alexarchus of Macedon, the brother of King Cassander of Macedon, was the founder of the city of Ouranopolis. Athenaeus recounts a story told by Heraclides of Lembos that Alexarchus "introduced a peculiar vocabulary, referring to a rooster as a 'dawn-crier', a barber as a 'mortal-shaver', a drachma as 'worked silver', [...] and a herald as an aputēs [from ēputa 'loud-voiced']. [...] He [Alexarchus] once wrote something [...] to the public authorities in Casandreia. [...] As for what this letter says, in my opinion not even the Pythian god could make sense of it."

While the mechanisms of grammar suggested by classical philosophers were designed to explain existing languages (Latin, Greek, and Sanskrit), they were not used to construct new grammars. Roughly contemporary with Plato, in his descriptive grammar of Sanskrit, Pāṇini constructed a set of rules for explaining language, so that the text of his grammar may be considered a mixture of natural and constructed language.

=== Early constructed languages ===
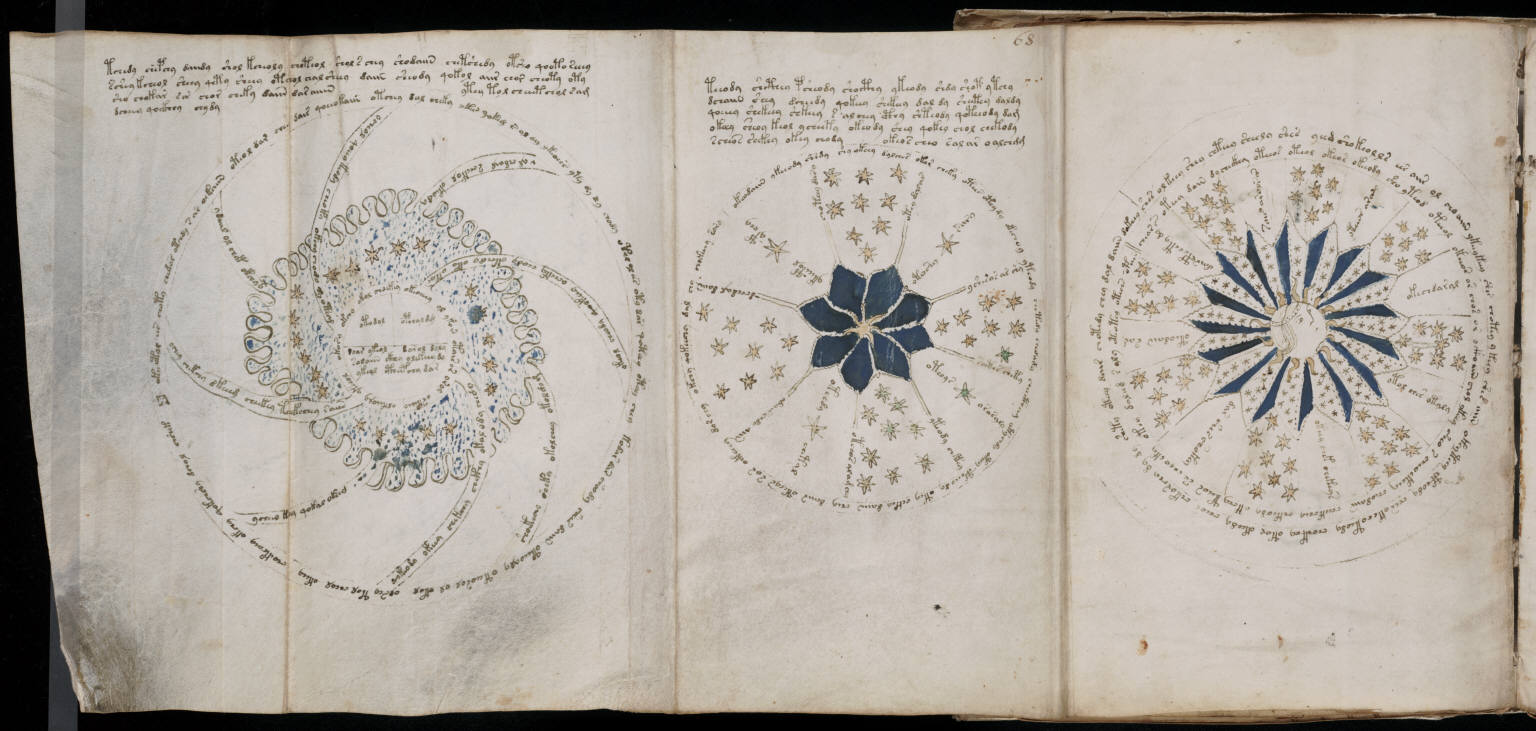
Page 68r of the Voynich manuscript. This three-page foldout from the manuscript includes a chart that appears astronomical.

A legend recorded in the seventh-century Irish work Auraicept na n-Éces claims that Fénius Farsaid visited Shinar after the confusion of tongues, and he and his scholars studied the various languages for ten years, taking the best features of each to create in Bérla tóbaide 'the selected language', which he named Goídelc – the Irish language. This appears to be the first mention of the concept of a constructed language in literature.

The earliest non-natural languages were considered less "constructed" than "super-natural", mystical, or divinely inspired. The Lingua Ignota, recorded in the 12th century by St. Hildegard of Bingen, is an example, and apparently the first entirely artificial language. It is a form of private mystical cant (see also Enochian). An important example from Middle-Eastern culture is Balaibalan, invented in the 16th century. Kabbalistic grammatical speculation was directed at recovering the original language spoken by Adam and Eve in Paradise, lost in the confusion of tongues. The first Christian project for an ideal language is outlined in Dante Alighieri's De vulgari eloquentia, where he searches for the ideal Italian vernacular suited for literature. Ramon Llull's Ars Magna was a project of a perfect language with which the infidels could be convinced of the truth of the Christian faith. It was basically an application of combinatorics on a given set of concepts. During the Renaissance, Lullian and Kabbalistic ideas were drawn upon in a magical context, resulting in cryptographic applications.

=== Perfecting language ===
Renaissance interest in Ancient Egypt, notably the discovery of the Hieroglyphica of Horapollo, and first encounters with the Chinese script directed efforts towards a perfect written language. Johannes Trithemius, in Steganographia and Polygraphia, attempted to show how all languages can be reduced to one. In the 17th century, interest in magical languages was continued by the Rosicrucians and alchemists (like John Dee and his Enochian). Jakob Boehme in 1623 spoke of a "natural language" (German: Natursprache) of the senses.

Musical languages were often connected with mysticism, like the language of the birds, though not necessarily, like Solresol.

=== 17th and 18th century: advent of philosophical languages ===
The 17th century saw the rise of projects for "philosophical" or "a priori" languages, such as:

- Francis Lodwick's A Common Writing (1647) and The Groundwork or Foundation laid (or So Intended) for the Framing of a New Perfect Language and a Universal Common Writing (1652)
- Sir Thomas Urquhart's Ekskybalauron (1651) and Logopandecteision (1652)
- George Dalgarno's Ars signorum, 1661
- John Wilkins' An Essay towards a Real Character, and a Philosophical Language, 1668

These early taxonomic constructed languages produced systems of hierarchical classification for both spoken and written expression. Leibniz had a similar purpose for his lingua generalis of 1678, aiming at a lexicon of characters where the user could calculate true propositions, developing binary calculus in the process. These projects focused on simplifying grammar, and arranging knowledge into hierarchies, eventually leading to the Enlightenment's Encyclopédie. Many of these 17th–18th century languages were pasigraphies, purely written languages without unique spoken form.

After Leibniz and the encyclopedists unsuccessfully organized knowledge unequivocally in a hierarchy, they worked on a priori languages based on such a classification of concepts. Under the entry Charactère, D'Alembert critically reviewed the projects of philosophical languages of the preceding century. After the Encyclopédie, projects for a priori languages moved more and more to the lunatic fringe. Individual authors, typically unaware of the history of the idea, continued to propose taxonomic philosophical languages until the early 20th century (e.g. Ro), but most recent engineered languages have remained small in scope; some are limited to a specific field, like mathematical formalism or calculus (e.g. Lincos and programming languages), while others are designed for eliminating syntactical ambiguity (e.g., Loglan and Lojban) or maximizing conciseness (e.g., Ithkuil).

=== 19th and 20th centuries: auxiliary languages ===
Already in the Encyclopédie attention began to focus on a posteriori auxiliary languages. Joachim Faiguet de Villeneuve in the article on Langue wrote a short proposition of a "laconic" or regularized grammar of French. During the 19th century, a bewildering variety of such International Auxiliary Languages (IALs) were proposed, so that Louis Couturat and Léopold Leau in Histoire de la langue universelle (1903) reviewed 38 projects.

The first of these that made any international impact was Volapük, proposed in 1879 by Johann Martin Schleyer; within a decade, 283 Volapükist clubs were counted all over the globe. However, disagreements between Schleyer and some prominent users of the language led to schism, and by the mid-1890s it fell into obscurity, making way for Esperanto, proposed in 1887 by L. L. Zamenhof, and its descendants. Interlingua, the most recent auxlang to gain a significant number of speakers, emerged in 1951, when the International Auxiliary Language Association published its Interlingua–English Dictionary and an accompanying grammar. The success of Esperanto did not stop others from trying to construct new auxiliary languages, such as Leslie Jones' Eurolengo, which mixes elements of English and Spanish.

Loglan (1955) and its descendants constitute a pragmatic return to the aims of the a priori languages, tempered by the requirement of usability of an auxiliary language. Thus far, these modern a priori languages have garnered only small groups of speakers.

Robot Interaction Language (2010) is a spoken language that is optimized for communication between machines and humans. The major goals of ROILA are that it should be easily learnable by the human user, and optimized for efficient recognition by computer speech recognition algorithms.

== Categorization ==
=== By purpose ===
Most constructed languages can be divided by purpose:

- Engineered language (engelang), further subdivided into logical language (loglang), philosophical language and experimental language, devised for experimentation in logic, philosophy, or linguistics
- International auxiliary language (auxlang or IAL), devised for interlinguistic or international communication
- Artistic language (artlang), devised to create aesthetic pleasure or humorous effect, including sub-categories such as secret languages, joke languages, and mystical languages

The boundaries between these categories are by no means clear, and a language could fall into more than one category. A logical language created for aesthetic reasons would also be classifiable as an artistic language. One created with philosophical motives could also be used as an auxiliary language.

Controlled natural languages have been devised to eliminate ambiguity in natural language processing and knowledge representation.

=== A priori and a posteriori ===
An a priori constructed language is one with features not based on an existing language, and an a posteriori language is the opposite. This categorization, however, is not absolute, as many constructed languages may be called a priori when considering some linguistic factors, and at the same time a posteriori when considering other factors.

==== A priori ====
An a priori language has features that are invented or elaborated to work differently or to allude to different purposes. Some a priori languages are designed to be international auxiliary languages that remove what could be considered an unfair learning advantage for native speakers of a source language that would otherwise exist for a posteriori languages. Others, known as philosophical or taxonomic languages, try to categorize their vocabulary, either to express an underlying philosophy or to make it easier to recognize new vocabulary. Finally, many artistic languages, created for either personal use or for use in a fictional medium, employ consciously constructed grammars and vocabularies, and are best understood as a priori. Examples include:

===== International auxiliary =====
- Balaibalan, attributed to Fazlallah Astarabadi or Muhyi Gulshani (14th century)
- Solresol by François Sudre (1827)
- Ro by Edward Foster (1906)
- Sona by Kenneth Searight (1935)
- Babm by Rikichi Okamoto (1962)
- aUI by W. John Weilgart (1962)
- Mirad (aka Unilingua) by Noubar Agopoff (1966)
- Kotava by Staren Fetcey (1978)

===== Experimental =====
- Láadan by Suzette Haden Elgin (1982)
- Ithkuil by John Quijada (2004)

===== Artistic =====
- Quenya and Sindarin by J. R. R. Tolkien for his legendarium (first published with The Hobbit, 1937)
- Klingon by Marc Okrand for the science-fiction franchise Star Trek (1985)
- Kēlen by Sylvia Sotomayor (1998)
- Naʼvi by Paul Frommer for the movie Avatar (2009)
- Dothraki and Valyrian by David Peterson for the television series Game of Thrones (2011)
- Kiliki by Madhan Karky for the Baahubali films (2015)

===== Community =====
- Damin (Yangkaal and Lardil people, 19th century or earlier)
- Eskayan (Eskaya, c. 1920)
- Medefaidrin (Ibibio, 1930s)
- palawa kani (Palawa, 1990s)

==== A posteriori ====
An a posteriori language (from Latin meaning "from the latter"), according to French linguist Louis Couturat, is any constructed language whose elements are borrowed from or based on existing languages. The term can also be extended to controlled language, and is most commonly used to refer to vocabulary despite other features. Likewise, zonal auxiliary languages (auxiliary languages for speakers of a particular language family) are a posteriori by definition.

While most auxiliary languages are a posteriori due to their intended function as a medium of communication, many artistic languages are fully a posteriori in design – many for the purposes of alternate history. In distinguishing whether the language is a priori or a posteriori, the prevalence and distribution of respectable traits is often the key.

Examples of a posteriori languages:

===== Artistic =====
- Talossan (Romance) by Robert Ben Madison for micronation Kingdom of Talossa (1980)
- Brithenig (Latin and Welsh) by Andrew Smith (1996)
- Atlantean (Indo-European) by Marc Okrand for the film Atlantis: The Lost Empire (2001)
- Toki Pona (various including English) by Sonja Lang (2001)
- Wenedyk (Latin and Polish) by Jan van Steenbergen (2002)
- Trigedasleng (English) by David Peterson for the TV series The 100 (2014)

===== Controlled auxiliary =====
- Latino sine flexione (Latin, 1911)
- Basic English (English, 1925)
- N'Ko (Manding, 1949)
- Learning English (English, 1959)
- Kitara (SW Ugandan Bantu, 1990)
- Globish (English, 2004)

===== International auxiliary =====
- (1868) Universalglot
- (1879) Volapük
- (1885) Pasilingua
- (1887) Esperanto
- (1902) Idiom Neutral
- (1907) Ido
- (1912) Reform-Neutral
- (1922) Interlingue
- (1928) Novial
- (1937) Esperanto II
- (c. 1943) Mondial
- (1951) Interlingua
- (1961) Neo
- (1970) Afrihili
- (c. 1979) Glosa
- (1986) Uropi
- (1991) Romániço
- (1998) Lingua Franca Nova
- (2007) Sambahsa
- (2010) Lingwa de planeta

===== Zonal auxiliary =====
- Efatese (c. Vanuatu Oceanic, 19th century)
- Romanid (Romance, 1956)
- palawa kani (Aboriginal Australian, 1992)
- Folkspraak (Germanic, 1995)
- Budinos (Finno-Ugric, 2000s)
- Neolatino Romance (Romance, 2006)
- Interslavic (Slavic, 2011)

=== Sensitivity ===
The term planned language is sometimes used to classify an international auxiliary language since the common alternative, artificial, may be perceived as pejorative. Outside Esperanto culture, (Note: Esperanto is the world's most widely spoken constructed international auxiliary language.) the term language planning means the prescriptions given to a natural language to standardize it; in this regard, even a "natural language" may be artificial in some respects, meaning some of its words have been crafted by conscious decision. Prescriptive grammars, which date to ancient times for classical languages such as Latin and Sanskrit, are rule-based codifications of natural languages, such codifications being a middle ground between naïve natural selection and development of language and its explicit construction. The term glossopoeia is also used to mean language construction, particularly construction of artistic languages.

Classifications are used differently by tradition. For example, few speakers of Interlingua consider their language artificial, since they assert that it has no invented content. Interlingua's vocabulary is taken from a small set of natural languages, and its grammar is based closely on these source languages, even including some degree of irregularity. Its proponents prefer to describe its vocabulary and grammar as standardized rather than artificial or constructed. Similarly, Latino sine flexione (LsF) is a simplification of Latin from which the inflections have been removed. As with Interlingua, some prefer to describe its development as planning rather than constructing. Some speakers of Esperanto and Esperantidos also avoid the term artificial language because they deny that there is anything unnatural about it.

=== Accuracy ===
Some argue that all human language is artificial, not natural. For example, in the 16th century (long before the establishment of modern linguistics), François Rabelais wrote through his gigantesque character Pantagruel:

C'est abus dire qu'ayons langage naturel. Les langages sont par institutions arbitraires et convenances des peuples : les voix, comme disent les dialecticiens, ne signifient naturellement, mais à plaisir.
It is a misuse of terms to say that we have natural language; languages exist through arbitrary institutions and the conventions of peoples. Voices, as the dialecticians say, don't signify naturally, but capriciously.

=== Naturalistic ===
Fictional or experimental languages can be considered naturalistic if they model real world languages. For example, if a naturalistic language is derived a posteriori from another language (real or constructed), it should imitate natural processes of phonological, lexical, and grammatical change. In contrast with languages such as Interlingua, naturalistic fictional languages are not usually intended for easy learning or communication. Thus, naturalistic fictional languages tend to be more difficult and complex. While Interlingua has simpler grammar, syntax, and orthography than its source languages (though more complex and irregular than Esperanto or its descendants), naturalistic fictional languages typically mimic behaviors of natural languages like irregular verbs and nouns, and complicated phonological processes.

== Rationale ==
Reasons to create a constructed language include: to ease human communication; to give fiction or an associated constructed setting an added layer of realism; for experimentation in the fields of linguistics, cognitive science, and machine learning; for artistic creation; for fantasy role-playing games; and for language games. Some people may also make constructed languages as a hobby, or in connection to worldbuilding.

A famous but disputed Sapir–Whorf hypothesis is sometimes cited which claims that the language one speaks influences the way one thinks. Thus, a better language should allow the speaker to think better – more clearly or intelligently or to encompass more points of view. This was the intention of Suzette Haden Elgin in creating Láadan, a feminist language embodied in her feminist science fiction series Native Tongue. Constructed languages have been included in standardized tests such as the SAT, where they were used to test the applicant's ability to infer and apply grammatical rules. By the same token, a constructed language might also be used to restrict thought, as in George Orwell's Newspeak, or to simplify thought, as in Toki Pona. However, linguists such as Steven Pinker argue that ideas exist independently of language. For example, in the book The Language Instinct, Pinker states that children spontaneously re-invent slang and even grammar with each generation. These linguists argue that attempts to control the range of human thought through the reform of language would fail, as concepts like "freedom" will reappear in new words if the old words vanish.

Proponents claim a particular language makes it easier to express and understand concepts in one area, and more difficult in others. An example can be taken from the way various programming languages make it easier to write certain kinds of programs and harder to write others.

Another reason cited for using a constructed language is the telescope rule, which claims that it takes less time to first learn a simple constructed language and then a natural language, than to learn only a natural language. Thus, if someone wants to learn English, some suggest learning Basic English first. Constructed languages like Esperanto and Interlingua are in fact often simpler due to the typical lack of irregular verbs and other grammatical quirks. Some studies have found that learning Esperanto helps in learning a non-constructed language later (see propaedeutic value of Esperanto).

== Development ==
Most modern developers, called conlangers, create constructed languages as a hobby, for a fictional work, or for personal fulfillment. Conlangers typically create languages by defining their language's phonology, syntax, grammar, and other properties. Doing so requires at least a rudimentary understanding of linguistics.

Various papers on constructed languages were published from the 1970s through the 1990s, such as Glossopoeic Quarterly, Taboo Jadoo, and The Journal of Planned Languages. The Conlang Mailing List was founded in 1991, and later split off an AUXLANG mailing list dedicated to international auxiliary languages. In the early to mid-1990s, a few constructed language-related zines were published as email or websites, such as Vortpunoj and Model Languages. The Conlang Mailing List has developed a community of conlangers with its own customs, such as translation challenges and translation relays, and its own terminology. Sarah Higley reports from results of her surveys that the demographics of the Conlang list are primarily men from North America and western Europe, with a smaller number from Oceania, Asia, the Middle East, and South America, with an age range from 13 to over 60; the number of women participating has increased over time.

Later online communities include the Zompist Bulletin Board (ZBB; since 2001) and the Conlanger Bulletin Board. Discussion on these forums includes presentation of members' constructed languages and feedback from other members, discussion of natural languages, whether particular features of constructed languages have natural language precedents, and how interesting features of natural languages can be repurposed for constructed languages, posting of interesting short texts as translation challenges, and meta-discussion about the philosophy of developing constructed languages, conlangers' purposes, and whether the creation of constructed languages is an art or a hobby. Another 2001 survey by Patrick Jarrett showed an average age of 30.65, with the average time since starting to invent languages 11.83 years. A more recent thread on the ZBB showed that many conlangers spend a relatively small amount of time on any one language, moving from one project to another; about a third spend years on developing the same language.

One constraint on a constructed language is that if it was constructed to be a natural language for use by fictional characters, as with Dothraki and High Valyrian in the Game of Thrones series, the language should be easily pronounced by actors, and should fit with and incorporate any fragments of the language already invented by the book's author, and preferably also fit with any personal names of fictional speakers of the language.

== Organic change ==
When a constructed language has a community of speakers, especially a large population, it tends to evolve and hence loses its constructed nature. For example, Esperanto has evolved significantly as a living spoken language from the prescriptive blueprint published in 1887, so that modern editions of the Fundamenta Krestomatio, a 1903 collection of early texts in the language, require many footnotes on the syntactic and lexical differences between early and modern Esperanto.

== Acceptance ==
Proficient speakers of constructed languages are few and far between. For example, the Hungarian census of 2011 found 8,397 speakers of Esperanto, and the census of 2001 found 10 of Romanid, two each of Interlingua and Ido and one each of Idiom Neutral and Mundolinco. The Russian census of 2010 found that in Russia there were about 992 speakers of Esperanto (the 120th most common) and nine of the Esperantido Ido.

According to Ethnologue, there are 200–2000 who speak Esperanto as a first language.

d'Armond Speers, a member of the Klingon Language Institute, attempted to raise his son as bilingual, using both English and the constructed Klingon language.

== Identification codes ==
Codes for constructed languages include the ISO 639-2 art for constructed languages; however, some constructed languages have their own ISO 639 language codes (e.g. eo and epo for Esperanto, jbo for Lojban, ia and ina for Interlingua, tlh for Klingon, io and ido for Ido, lfn for Lingua Franca Nova, and tok for Toki Pona).

== Ownership ==
The matter of whether a constructed language can be owned or protected by intellectual property laws, or if it would even be possible to enforce those laws, is contentious.

In a 2015 lawsuit, CBS and Paramount Pictures challenged a fan film project called Axanar, stating the project infringed upon their intellectual property, which included the Klingon language, among other creative elements. During the controversy, Marc Okrand, the language's original designer expressed doubt as to whether Paramount's claims of ownership were valid. The Language Creation Society submitted an amicus curiae brief claiming that the Klingon language itself is not copyrightable under section 102(b) of the Copyright Act of 1976, as it is "a procedure, process, or system for communication," rather than an expression of an idea.

David J. Peterson, who created multiple well-known constructed languages including the Valyrian languages and Dothraki, advocated a similar opinion, saying that "Theoretically, anyone can publish anything using any language I created, and, in my opinion, neither I nor anyone else should be able to do anything about it."

However, Peterson also expressed concern that the respective rights-holders – regardless of whether or not their ownership of the rights is legitimate – would be likely to sue individuals who publish material in said languages, especially if the author might profit from said material.

Furthermore, comprehensive learning material for such constructed languages as High Valyrian and Klingon has been published and made freely accessible on the language-learning platform Duolingo – but those courses are licensed by the respective copyright holders. Because only a few such disputes have occurred thus far, the legal consensus on ownership of languages remains uncertain.

The Tasmanian Aboriginal Centre claims ownership of palawa kani, an attempted composite reconstruction of up to a dozen extinct Tasmanian indigenous languages, and has asked Wikipedia to remove its article on the project. However, there is no current legal backing for the claim.

== See also ==
- List of constructed languages
- Interlinguistics
- Aboriginal constructed languages: Damin, Eskayan
- Idioglossia
- Idiolect
- Cant (language)
- ISO, SIL, and BCP language codes for constructed languages
- Language construction
  - Constructed script
  - Langmaker
  - Language Construction Kit
  - Language game
  - Language regulator
  - List of language inventors
- Language modelling and translation
  - Knowledge representation
  - Language translation
  - Metalanguage
  - Universal grammar
- Mystical languages
  - Glossolalia
  - Language of the birds
- Spontaneous emergence of grammar
  - Artificial language
  - June and Jennifer Gibbons
  - Nicaraguan Sign Language
  - Origin of language
  - Pidgin
  - Poto and Cabengo
- Linguistic determinism
- Linguistic relativity
- Pasigraphy
- Universal language
- In the Land of Invented Languages
- Auxlang
