= Codes for constructed languages =

List of strings identifying consciously devised languages in several standards

This is a list of ISO 639 codes and IETF language tags (BCP 47) for individual constructed languages, complete as of January 2023.

ISO 639-2 and ISO 639-5 also have the code art for artificial languages. The BCP 47 subtag x can be used to create a suitable private use tag for any constructed language that has not been assigned an official language tag (e.g., art-x-solresol could be used for Solresol).

The old SIL language identifiers (usually written in capitals) are officially obsolete and should no longer be used. They formed the basis of the ISO 639-3 language codes, but some SIL identifiers that had been retired before the establishment of ISO 639-3 were later assigned to different languages within ISO.

The IANA Language Subtag Registry (for IETF's language tags defined in BCP 47) was updated on 29 July 2009 to include all ISO 639-3 and ISO 639-5 identifiers in use at that time.

== List of codes ==
Language	ISO 639-1	ISO 639-2	ISO 639-3	BCP 47	Glottolog
Afrihili		afh	afh	afh	afri1275
Arcaicam Esperantom				eo-arkaika	
Balaibalan			zba	zba	bala1318
Basic English				en-basiceng	
Blissymbols		zbl	zbl	zbl	blis1239
Blissymbols with the limited Authorized Vocabulary defined by BCI				zbl-bciav	
Blissymbols as defined by Blissymbolics Communication International				zbl-bcizbl	
Brithenig			bzt	bzt	brit1244
Dutton Speedwords			dws	dws	dutt1234
Efatese					efat1235
Enochian				~~i-enochian~~ (Note: The BCP 47 language tags i-enochian, i-klingon and art-lojban are old tags that were grandfathered in and are now deprecated.)	
Eskayan			esy	esy	eska1234
Esperanto	eo	epo	epo	eo	espe1235
Esperanto with H-digraphs				eo-hsistemo	
Esperanto with X-digraphs				eo-xsistemo	
Europanto			~~eur~~ (Note: The ISO 639-3 standard previously included the code eur for Europanto, which was retired on 2009-01-16, with the reason “Nonexistent”.)		
Ido	io	ido	ido	io	idoo1234
Interglossa			igs	igs	inte1261
Interlingua (IALA)	ia	ina	ina	ia	inte1239
Interlingue (formerly Occidental)	ie	ile	ile ~~occ~~ (Note: ISO 639-3 used to have the code occ for Occidental. This was retired on 18 July 2007, because Occidental is just another name for Interlingue, which has the code ile.)	ie	inte1262 inte1260
Interslavic			isv	isv	inte1263
Klingon		tlh	tlh	tlh ~~i-klingon~~	klin1234
Kotava			avk	avk	kota1280
Láadan			ldn	ldn	laad1235
Latino sine flexione				la-peano	
Lingua Franca Nova			lfn	lfn	ling1267
Lojban		jbo	jbo	jbo ~~art-lojban~~	lojb1234
Medefaidrin			dmf	dmf	
Neo			neu	neu	neoa1234
Novial			nov	nov	novi1234
Original Volapük				vo-rigik	
Palawa kani					pala1356
Quenya			qya	qya	quen1234
Romanova			rmv	rmv	roma1338
Sindarin			sjn	sjn	sind1281
Talossan			tzl	tzl	talo1253
Toki Pona			tok	tok	toki1239
Volapük	vo	vol	vol	vo vo-nulik	vola1234

BCP 47 has also reserved simple for simplified languages.

=== Writing systems ===
When a constructed language has multiple writing systems, the following BCP 47 tags can be used to differentiate between them.

Language	Script	BCP 47
Interslavic	Latin	isv-Latn
Interslavic	Cyrillic	isv-Cyrl
Klingon	Latin	tlh-Latn
Klingon	KLI pIqaD	tlh-Piqd
Lingua Franca Nova	Latin	lfn-Latn
Lingua Franca Nova	Cyrillic	lfn-Cyrl
Quenya	Latin	qya-Latn
Quenya	Tengwar	qya-Teng
Quenya	Cirth	qya-Cirt
Quenya	Sarati	qya-Sara
Sindarin	Latin	sjn-Latn
Sindarin	Tengwar	sjn-Teng
Sindarin	Cirth	sjn-Cirt

(This table only includes primary writing systems of each language, so it does not include examples such as Esperanto written in the Shavian alphabet.)

== See also ==
- Language code
- List of ISO 639-1 codes
