= Alexarchus =

Alexarchus may refer to:

- Alexarchus of Corinth (fl. 413 BC), Greek general in the Peloponnesian War
- Alexarchus of Macedon (c. 350–c. 290 BC), Macedonian scholar
- Alexarchus (historian), Greek historian who wrote a work on the history of Italy
