= Sona (constructed language) =

Language created by Kenneth Searight in 1935

- Created by: Kenneth Searight
- Date: 1935
- Setting and usage: international auxiliary language
- Purpose: Constructed language: auxiliary language; Sona
- Sources: The language has 375 radicals or root words based on the terms in Roget's original thesaurus. Ideas and sentences are formed by juxtaposing the radicals.

Language codes
- ISO 639-3: None (mis)
- Glottolog: None
- IETF: art-x-sona

Sona is an international auxiliary language created by Kenneth Searight and described in a book he published in 1935. The word Sona in the language itself means "auxiliary neutral thing". The similarity to the English word 'sonorous' is superficial.

Searight created Sona as a response to the Eurocentricity of other artificial auxiliary languages of his time, such as Esperanto and Ido. At the same time, Searight intended his language to be more practical than most a priori languages like Solresol or Ro, which were intended to be unbiased by any particular group of natural languages. Thus, Sona sacrificed familiarity of grammar and lexicon for some measure of "universality", while at the same time preserving basic notions common to grammars around the world such as compounding as a method of word formation. Searight used inspiration from many diverse languages, including English, Arabic, Turkish, Chinese and Japanese, to create his eclectic yet regular and logical language.

Searight specifically chose only sounds that speakers of many languages could say, therefore making it a true universal language. He hoped that in a perfect world, Sona would be taught to young children everywhere.

Sona is an agglutinative language with a strong tendency towards being an isolating language. The language has 360 radicals or root words whose meanings are based on the categories in Roget's original thesaurus, plus an additional 15 particles. Ideas and sentences are formed by juxtaposing the radicals. Thus, ra "male" plus ko "child" makes rako "boy".

Searight's book, Sona; an auxiliary neutral language (London, K. Paul, Trench, Trubner & Co., Ltd., 1935, LCCN: 35016722) is the only published example of this language. There is a small community on the Internet interested in reviving and using Sona.

== Writing ==
Sona uses the Latin alphabet and contains 24 letters. Although the author provides the rules for writing in Sona in his text, he also specifies that Sona has "few hard and fast rules." One mentioned rule in regards to writing covered by Searight is that foreign words are written with a capital. Even in regards to punctuation, Searight claims it is "desirable that we leave the matter more or less opened to choice."

== Alphabet ==
Sona alphabet
Upper case	A	B	C	D	E	F	G	H	I	J	K	L	M	N	O	P	R	S	T	U	V	X	Y	Z
Lower case	a	b	c	d	e	f	g	h	i	j	k	l	m	n	o	p	r	s	t	u	v	x	y	z
IPA phoneme	a	b	t͡ʃ	d	e	f	g	h	i	d͡ʒ, ʒ	k	l	m	n	o	p	r	s	t	u	v	ʃ	j, ə	z

The Sona alphabet has 24 letters. Searight lists no official order but presents the following chart:

six vowels	a	e	i	o	u	y
six aspirates	c	j	x	f	v	h
six consonants (i)	g	d	z	m	b	l
six consonants (ii)	k	t	s	n	p	r

The vowels are sounded as in Italian. British English equivalents are fast, fete, machine, fort, rule. y is the neutral vowel of Welsh, but before another vowel, it is pronounced as the English y (e.g. yard). The alphabet letters are "named" by adding the vowel y. For the vowels of the alphabet, the y is initial, such as ya, ye, yi, yo, yu, y, and is final for aspirates and consonants, such as cy, gy, ky, etc. The y is also useful for separating two like vowels in a word and for separating an -n radical from a vowel. For instance, ta-ata becomes tayata and ta-o becomes tayo. This helps reduce confusion by distinguishing words from other similar combined radicals. i and u are shortened before a vowel. The only consonant that is final allowed is -n.

== Radicals ==
The language consists of 360 radicals and 15 particles, each of which represents a single unit of meaning. Every word in Sona can be decomposed into radicals and, conversely, new words can be constructed by combining them in various ways. Radicals are meant to represent symbolic ideas or groups of ideas, and this simplifies the language by connecting words to one another based on universal concepts.

The radicals are organized into groups of five which share both a consonant-vowel root and a fundamental meaning. Each radical in the group is created by attaching a-, u-, or i- or -n. For example, the group ta (increase) also contains the radicals tan (bulk), ata (extension), ita (filling), and uta (swelling).

When radicals are combined, their order affects the resulting meaning. A radical used as a prefix will be dominant, while one used as a suffix will be subordinate, hence tara "big man" versus rata "giant."

A radical can change meaning depending on its context. Some radicals take on a different meaning when used as an affix, e.g. when used as a prefix, the meaning of ka changes from "lead" to a causal maker. Many compounds take on set meanings beyond that of their component parts. For example, akizu, literally "fast animal," signifies "horse."

== Phonetics and phonology ==
The 360 radicals are split up into consonants and aspirates. Of the 12 consonants, each can be categorized five different ways, isolated and with the four possible affixes. This gives us 300 radicals. The 6 aspirates, c, j, x, f, v, and h, have only the -n form, which gives us the remaining 60 radicals. Searight decided to exclude diphthongs from Sona in order to maintain its universality. Here is an example of how radicals are modified with prefixes and suffixes to create new words.

Primary	TA (augment)	TE (grasp)	TO (passing)
-n	tan (bulk)	ten (reception)	ton (exhaust)
a-	ata (extension)	ate (tube)	ato (senility)
i-	ita (filling)	ite (flap)	ito (expiring)
u-	uta (swelling)	ute (pocket)	uto (excess)

There are 180 disyllables, and the remaining 5 monosyllables are the particles au, ua, ue, ui, and uo. The only vowels allowed as radical prefixes are a, i, and u.

Sona does not use a formal suffix for possession, but one may add -si for emphasis, which is the equivalent of an English -'s.

The epithet is always placed before its head word, so one would say "the big dog," as in English, and not "the dog big," as in Spanish.

While radicals may be compounded, they also can be isolated words. For instance, te alone means "hand," but compounding it creates tebi (handle), bute (nose), and tega (arm).

As for the aspirates, h is aspirated, x is pronounced like the sh in "shin," j may be sounded as in the English "ʤ" or the French "ʒ". Since there is already a letter k in Sona, c is pronounced like the ch in "chin." f and v are pronounced how English speakers pronounce them.

As for the consonants, only three of them need mentioning. g is always a hard G, meaning it is pronounced like the G in Gary as opposed to the G in Gym. z is pronounced like the Z in "zeal," but it can vary to the Italian variation of dz, or the German variation of ts. Also, s is always sharp, meaning it never sounds like a Z as in "as." The remaining consonants are pronounced as English speakers would pronounce them. Sona also has no double consonants or digraphs.

Sona utilizes elision, meaning when a radical with a vowel prefix is followed by its own primary or -n form, the common vowel is dropped. For example, ata-ta becomes atta, and ata-tan becomes attan.

For foreign sounds and words, Sona uses the phonetic symbol for that word and writes it with an initial capital letter. Sona rarely utilizes capital letters, and Sona is the only word in Sona spelled with a capital letter. For technical and scientific terms, such as Greek and Latin words, Sona leaves them as is, occasionally changing an initial C to K to match the sounds, for instance Carnival becomes Karnival. These words are spelled in accordance with the language of origin, and last names are not altered.

Sona is not a tonal language and therefore the tonic accent is evenly distributed throughout speech, such as Japanese and French.

Punctuation is not a necessary part of the language since there are prefixes and suffixes for questions and emphasis. However, in Sona it is up to a person's preference whether or not they would like to use punctuation.

For nouns, the definite article is en, meaning "it," and is optionally used for emphasis. For instance, ra stands for "man", but en ra means "the (very) man." There is no indefinite article in Sona. It does, however, borrow an Honorific from Japanese. O is used before names, words of address, and verbs as an expression of politeness. For instance, O ra means "honorable man." It can also mean "please."

For naming, the radical ha, meaning "name," converts another radical into a name that addresses a person. For instance, hara (name and man) signifies Mr. Monsieur, Signor, Herr, Sir, etc. Inanimate objects have no gender. Sex is marked by ra, meaning male or man, and zan, meaning female or woman.

== Morphology ==
All words can be fully analyzed into their constituent radicals (with the exception of proper nouns and borrowed words). As a result, the morphology of the language is a combination of isolating and agglutinating, and contains no fusional element.

Most word formation is done by compounding. When compounding radicals, the first one is said to be the "governing radical," and the following ones act as modifiers. The language also permits the compounding of polysyllabic words.

=== Inflectional morphology ===
==== Nouns ====
There are twelve cases. For nominative and accusative, the noun and the verb are compounded. For the former, the noun comes first and for the latter, the verb. For possessive, the possessor is simply placed before the possessed, but the suffix -si can be added to the possessor if needed for clarification. Three of the cases are formed with affixes: the vocative with -ha, the directive with -li, and the locative with a-. The remaining cases are formed analytically with a word placed before the noun: dili for the motive, li for the dative, ne for the ablative, bi for instrumental, vi for genitive, and di for partitive.

Nouns can optionally be marked for plural (-e), collective (-gi).

Only animate nouns are marked for gender: ra for male, zan for female, and -ji or -ci for neuter, with the latter having an additional agentive meaning. The inanimates have special noun affixes which mark them as either inorganic (-na) or organic (-ga).

The augmentative is -ta- and the diminutive is -ko-. The approbative is marked by -xa and the disapprobative is marked by -ze.

===== Adjectives =====
The comparative is formed by e- and superlative is formed by en e- (with en meaning "the"). However, they do not have to be marked explicitly. Compare koyo ra "small man", ekoyo ra "smaller man", and en ekoyo ra "the smallest man."

Table of Comparison of Adjectives
	e- (comparative)	en e- (superlative)
ko (small)	eko (less, smaller)	en eko (least, smallest)
ta (big)	eta (more, bigger)	en eta (most, biggest)

==== Verbs ====
Both prepositions and pronouns may be optionally attached to the end of the verb.

Three different radicals can be used to mark transitivity: -ka- ("cause"), -ba ("strike, forceful"), -ru ("go, get").

Searight gives this verb paradigm using the root ru, "move," as an example:

Verb Paradigm
Broad	Specific	Example	Translation
Infinitive	General	da ru	"to go"
	Intention	ua da ru	"in order to go'
	Past	da to ru	"to have gone"
	Future	da va ru	"to be about to go"
Imperative	Command	ruha, ru	"go!"
	Proposal	dami ru	"let me go"
Participle	Relative	ruci	"who (which) is going"
Adverbial	Gerund	rui	"(while) going"
	Absolute	rutio	"having gone"
Indicative	Present	ru	"go/goes"
	Actual	ruci	"am/is/are going"
	Past	ruto	"went"
	Perfect	to ru	"have/has gone"
	Imperfect	to ruci	"were/was going"
	Pluperfect	to ruto	"had gone"
Conditional	Probable	va to ru	"would have gone"
	Possible	fa to ru	"may, might have gone"
Future	Intention	va ru	"will go"
Aorist	Possible	fa ru	"may go"

=== Derivational morphology ===
==== Nouns ====
Instrumental nouns can be formed with -bi; places are denoted by -a, -ma, or -ca; buildings by -kan; times are formed with -ri.

Abstract nouns may be formed in several ways. A noun of state is produced with -ne, a verbal noun is produced with -da, and a noun of quality is produced with -vi. For example, starting with the radical di, "divide," one can create dine, "division;" dida, "dividing;" and divi, "particularity."

==== Adjectives ====
The primary method of adjective formation is the suffix -(y)o, as in tayo, "great." They can be used as predicates by omitting the o, as in ra ta, "the man is big."

Adjectives with more specific meanings can be derived in several other ways. Searight gives the following list, using ra, "man," to generate an example of each:

Adjectival suffixes
Suffix	Meaning	Example
-vio	of the quality of	ravio, "virile"
-bio	used for	rabio, "phallic"
-dio	of, belonging to	radio, "masculine"
-lio	able to	ralio, "potent"
-sio	like, ish	rasio, "manly"
-kio	beginning to	rakio, "adolescent"
-fio	not quite, hardly	rafio, "effeminate"
-cio or -ci	participle	racio, "one who acts like a man" or "brave"
-nio or -ni	passive adjective, -ized	ranio, "virilized"
-beyo	without, -less	rabeyo, "without a man"
-noyo	bearing	ranoyo, "bearing sons"
-panyo	full of, -ful	rapanyo, "manful"

==== Adverbs ====
Some adverbial forms are derived by a suffix, like adjectives, while others are formed analytically. The default method of creating an adverb is the word po preceding it. Searight offers the following adverb derivations:

Adverbial suffix
Derivation	Meaning	Example
-(y)u	manner	irau, "strongly"
bi	means	bi ira, "by force"
po	general	po ira, "in strength"
a-	rest	afu, "outside"
-li	motion	fuli, "outwards"
-i	gerund	fui, "while putting out"
-ua	emphatic	naua, "not at all"
-ui	affirmative	naui, "yet"

==== Verbs ====
Radicals can be converted into verbs analytically by the addition of da before the root.

== Syntax ==
Searight's central claim on syntax in Sona is that "the construction of the Sona sentence is based upon the logical sequence of ideas." The syntactical structure of Sona is intended to be as intuitive and logical as possible, although Searight does present some rules in his text under the "Syntax" section. According to Searight, the word order is SVO, with qualifying words preceding the words they qualify. Searight stresses that "the construction of the Sona sentence must not be confined to European models."
