= Romanid =

Constructed language created in 1956

- Created by: Zoltán Magyar
- Date: 1956
- Setting and usage: Inter-Romance auxiliary language
- Users: 10 in Hungary (2001)
- Purpose: Constructed language: International auxiliary language; zonal auxiliary language; Romanid
- Writing system: Latin and Latin alphabet
- Sources: A posteriori, naturalistic, based on the Romance languages

Language codes
- ISO 639-3: None (mis)
- Glottolog: None
- IETF: art-x-romanid

Romanid is a zonal auxiliary language for speakers of Romance languages, intended to be understandable to them without prior study. It was created by the Hungarian language teacher Zoltán Magyar, who published a first version in May 1956 and a second in December 1957. In 1984, he published a phrasebook with a short grammar, in which he presents a slightly more simplified version of the language.

The language is based on the most common word senses in French, Italian, Portuguese and Spanish. It is rare, even in Hungary where it originated. According to the Russian newspaper Trud, Romanid, from a structural point of view, is "considerably simpler and easier to learn than Esperanto."

== Example ==
(1957 version)
Moy lingva project nominad Romanid fu publicad ja in may de pasad ano cam scientific studium in hungar lingva...
(1984 version)
Mi lingua project nominat Romanid esed publicat ja in may de pasat an cam scientific studio in hungar lingua...
(translation)
My language project called Romanid was published already in May of last year as a scientific study in Hungarian...

== Literature ==
- Zoltán Magyar. A Romanid nyelv rövid nyelvtana. Debrecen, 1958.
- Zoltán Magyar, "Mi az interlingvisztika? (A nemzetközi világnyelvekről)". In: Alföld, no. 8, 1965.
- Zoltán Magyar, Romanid. Tájékoztató és társalgási könyv, Kossuth Lajos Tudományegyetem, Debrecen, 1984 (ISBN 963 471 337 8).
- Zsuzsa Varga-Haszonits, "Romanid". In: István Fodor, A világ nyelvei. Akadémiai Kiadó, Budapest, 1999 (ISBN 963 05 7597 3), pp. 1222–1223.
