= Pasilingua =

Constructed language created in the 19th century

- Created by: Paul Steiner
- Date: 1885
- Purpose: Constructed language: International auxiliary language; Pasilingua
- Writing system: Latin
- Sources: vocabulary from English, French and German

Language codes
- ISO 639-3: None (mis)
- Glottolog: None

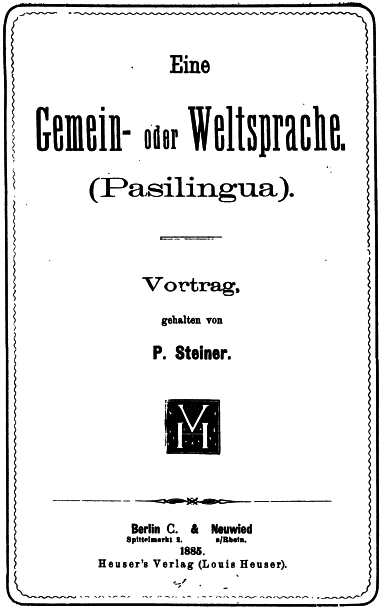
The cover of the first edition of Pasilingua

Pasilingua is an international auxiliary language proposed by Paul Steiner, first published in Neuwied in 1885 in his book Three World Language Systems (German: Drei Weltsprach-Systeme).

== Overview ==
For a time, Pasilingua was regarded as a serious competition to Volapük, but never got much support. However, Frederick Bodmer lauded the project and its author for its inclusion of pidgin elements; it was quoted by Louis Couturat and Leopold Leau, in their Histoire de la langue universelle, and in books of various other interlinguists at the beginning of the 20th century.

The language was based on English, with influences from French and German. Its radicals had natural appearance, without much deformation, but the derivation was not natural, as it was possible to radically change the appearance of word; however, word families were formed regularly.

In spite of its name, the language is not a pasigraphy because it is not an a priori language, but a posteriori/natural one, almost a euroclone.

== Alphabet and pronunciation ==
The alphabet has 31 letters:

- 10 vowels: a, ä, è, e, i, y, o, u, ü (French u);
- 21 consonants: b, c, ç (/s/), d, f, g, h, j, k, l, m, n, p, q, r, s, t, v, w, x, z.

There are also two digraphs: ch and sch. The words are pronounced like in German.

There is no stress.

== Grammar ==
=== Article ===
The definite article is to (masculine), te (feminine), ta (neuter);

The indefinite article is uno (masculine), une (feminine), una (neuter).

The articles agree with the noun in number and case. There are four cases in a single conjugation; case can be indicated on the article - to (nominative), tode (genitive), toby (dative) and ton (accusative) - or on the noun.

=== Nouns ===
Nouns have four cases and three genders; all form plural by adding -s.

Gender endings are: masculine in -o; feminine in -e and neuter in either -a (concrete) or -u (abstract). For example, to homino (the man), te femine (the woman), ta cita (the city), ta modestiu (the modesty).

The four cases are nominative, genitive, dative and accusative, like in German.

Pasilingua declension	Singular	Plural
Nominative	mortu (the death)	mortus
Genitive	mortude	mortusde
Dative	mortuby (to the world)	mortusby
Accusative	mortun	mortun

=== Verbs ===
Verbs have four conjugations:

1) Grander esse - to be big
2) Grandir esse - to become big
3) Grandar esse - to make (something) big
4) Grandor esse - to be made big

Each conjugation has three tenses:

1) mi morter - I die
2) mi mortefer - I died
3) mi morterer - I will die

== Vocabulary ==
The majority of the vocabulary was based on English, French, German and Latin; particles were generally based on the former. A lot of words had two synonyms, Germanic and Romance - for example bono and guto mean "good" and Deo and Gotto mean "God".

Much like in other constructed languages, words are formed by affixes. For example, - mortu, death; morto, dead (masculine gender); morte, dead (fem.); morta, dead (neut.); mortiro, dying; mortaro, murderer; mortamenta, instrument of murder; mortana, poison; mortarea, battlefield; mortitarea, churchyard; mortiblo, mortal; mortablo, fatal; mortoblo, easy to kill; morter, to be dead; mortir, to die; mortar, to kill; mortor, to be killed

== Examples ==
The Lord's Prayer:

Patro miso,
quo er in coela,
nama tü sanctore
kingdoma tüa kommire,
tüa willu fairore
sur erda ut in coela.
Donnare misbi misan brodan taglian;
pardonnare missas dettas
uti mis pardonnars misosbi debitorosbi.

Numbers from one to ten:

1	2	3	4	5	6	7	8	9	10
una	dua	tria	quadra	quinqua	sexa	septa	octa	nova	deka

Some sentences:

Quota hora er al? - What o'clock [=time] is it?
Ubi habitiris tüs? - Where do you live?
Annóncius ers pro tos affäriros qua ta vapora pro ta industriu. - Advertisements are to the man of business what steam is to industry.

== Bibliography ==
- F. Bodmer: The Loom of Language (1943), p. 442
- Moser, Hans: Zur Universal-Sprache: Kritische Studie über Volapük und Pasilingua, Berlin [Neuwied]: Heuser, 1887 (32 p.), 408.9 M853u
- Pei, Mario: One Language for the World. New York: The Devin-Adair Company, 1958.
- Steiner, Paul: Elementargrammatik nebst Übungsstücken zur Gemein- oder Weltsprache Pasilingua, Neuwied: 1885 (80 p.)
- Steiner, Paul: Summary of the Universal Language Pasilingua, Neuwied: 1900 (35 p.)
