= Eurolengo =

Artificial auxiliary language

- Created by: Leslie Jones
- Date: 1972
- Setting and usage: International auxiliary language
- Users: None known
- Purpose: Constructed language: international auxiliary; zonal; Eurolengo
- Writing system: Latin
- Sources: Vocabulary from English and Spanish

Language codes
- ISO 639-3: qel (local use)
- Glottolog: None
- IETF: art-x-euroleng

Eurolengo is a constructed language invented by Leslie Jones in 1972. It was constructed to be a common European language and "a practical tool for business and tourism."

The vocabulary consists of words borrowed from English and Spanish and made to conform to a consistent phonetic and orthographic system. Critics find a Spanglish flavor to the language, and that "reading is only straightforward if the requisite languages (in this case English and Spanish) are already familiar."

Auxiliary languages in general, and regional ones such as Eurolengo in particular, have had little support from the international community; Eurolengo has never had any speakers.

== Linguistic features ==
According to its author, there are only three pages of grammar rules.

=== Alphabet ===
Neo alphabet (+ digraphs)
Number	1	2	3	4	5	6	8	8	9	10	11	12	13	14	15	16	17	18	19	20	21	22	23	24	25	26
Upper case	A	B	CH	D	E	F	G	H	I	J	K	L	M	N	O	P	Q	R	S	T	U	V	W	X	Y	Z
Lower case	a	b	ch	d	e	f	g	h	i	j	k	l	m	n	o	p	q	r	s	t	u	v	w	x	y	z
IPA phoneme	a	b	t͡ʃ	d	e	f	g	h	i	d͡ʒ	k	l	m	n	o	p	kw	r	s	t	u	v	w	ks	j	z

The Eurolengo alphabet is almost the same as the English alphabet, except there is no C (its phonemes being taken over by either S or K), but the Ch digraph is treated as a letter.

a=ah, b= bay, ch = chay, d=day, e = eh, f=eff, g=gay, h=ash, i = ee, j = jay, k = kay, l = ell, m = em, n = en, o = oh, p = pay, q=kw, r=air, s = ess, t=tay, u = oo, v = vee, w=wee, x = eks, y = eye, z = zed

=== Verbs ===
According to its author all verbs are regular.

=== Nouns ===
Nouns in Eurolengo have no gender, but a suffix can be added to derive specifically feminine words from their masculine counterparts, such as in the case of making kusin into kusina to indicate a male cousin or a female cousin.

== Example ==
Eurolengo isto tres fasil. Le lengo habo un diksionarie de venti mil paroles. It isto kompletik fonetik and le difisile sonds in le lengos de West Europe isto elimanado.
