= Budinos =

International auxiliary language based on Finno-Ugric languages

- Setting and usage: international auxiliary language for speakers of Finno-Ugric languages
- Ethnicity: Finno-Ugrians
- Purpose: Constructed language: Budinos
- Sources: Udmurt, Hungarian

Language codes
- ISO 639-3: qbu (local use)
- IETF: art-x-budinos (local use)

Budinos is a constructed language designed to be an international auxiliary language for speakers of Finno-Ugric languages. Budinos builds mainly on Udmurt and Hungarian but also has features from Finnish, Estonian, Mari, and other related languages.

Budinos originates in an initiative from ethnofuturists in Udmurtia from the perspective that foreign languages are insufficient to fully communicate the Finno-Ugric world view in full, according to ethnofuturist thinking. The language has been employed in artistic usage both in Udmurtia and in Estonia.

The name 'Budinos' originates in Herodotus' Histories which, according to one of the authors of the language, Yuri Perevoshchikov, describes a pastoral tribe named 'the Budins' by the river Don.
