= Ro language =

Constructed language by Edward Foster

Ro
- Pronunciation: [ɹo]
- Created by: Edward Powell Foster
- Date: 1906
- Setting and usage: Categorizing human thought.
- Users: Unknown (2018)
- Purpose: constructed language: Ro
- Writing system: Latin
- Sources: a priori language

Language codes
- ISO 639-3: None (mis)
- Glottolog: None
- IETF: art-x-rooo

Ro is an a priori constructed language created by Rev. Edward Powell Foster beginning in 1904.

== History ==
Rev. Edward Powell Foster worked on his "international language" for 25 years before compiling a dictionary which initially had 257 pages with more than 6,000 words. The local newspaper in Newark, Ohio, published a mention of Foster visiting the city in 1929 to deliver copies of his "Ro" dictionary. In the January 23, 1929, issue of The Evening Star newspaper, in the "Answers to Questions" column, and R.S. submitted the question "Is there a Ro dictionary?" The column editor, Frederic J. Haskin responded, "A dictionary of about 12,000 words in the Ro language was published in 1928. The first publication concerning Ro was distributed in 1906." The January 25, 1922, issue of The Arizona Republican published an article entitled "Made-to-Order Language" which discussed "Ro" specifically; however, the article also states "We have received some literature relative to the 'Ro' language, from, we suppose its inventor, Rev. E. P. Foster, have spent some hours in vain trying to acquire head or tail of it... We do not think much of it. We believe too much in evolution to believe in made-to-order language... Still the men who are trying to bring us all into one language family are no wilder than the other idealists who are trying to bring us into one-nation family."

== Characteristics ==
In Ro, words are constructed using a category system. For example, all words starting with "bofo-" signify colors; the word for red is "bofoc", and yellow is "bofof". Foster did not simply try to design a better language in general, but to optimize his language for one design criterion: recognizability of unknown words. Foster wrote about Ro:

Ro did not begin with attempting to rival or supplant any other language whatever, either natural or artificial, nor was it suggested by any of them. Unexpectedly came the thought: "How strange it is that there is nothing in the appearance of a written or printed word that gives the slightest hint of its meaning. Why should a word not be a picture? A new word, never seen before would then, like a painting seen for the first time, convey at least some of the meaning to the eye."

After working on the language for about two years, Foster published the first booklet about Ro in 1906. The publication of Ro periodicals was supported by several American sponsors, especially from the Marietta, Ohio area, including Melvil Dewey, inventor of the Dewey Decimal Classification (another attempt to categorize human knowledge), Vice President Charles G. Dawes, George White, who mentioned Ro in the Congressional Record, and Alice Vanderbilt Morris of IALA. Several more books about Ro by Foster and his wife appeared over the years, as late as 1932. The entirety of George White's mention of Ro in the Congressional Record reads: "By Mr. WHITE (by request) : Resolution (H. Res. 432) providing for an investigation of a new language known as Ro; to the Committee on Education."

A common criticism of Ro is that it can be difficult to hear the difference between two words; usually one consonant makes the word different in meaning, but still similar enough that the intended meaning often cannot be guessed from context. This characteristic is common among philosophical languages, which are characterized by vocabulary developed taxonomically, independently of natural languages. A posteriori languages, such as Esperanto and Interlingua, are more popular than the a priori type, perhaps partly because their familiar vocabulary makes them easy to learn and recognize. Conversely, a priori languages are seen as being more neutral because there are so many languages and root words used in different languages may be completely different.

Solresol was an earlier classificatory language that by using a smaller symbol set achieved easier distinctness. There have been a few more recent attempts to design a language along similar lines, such as Ygyde and the Japanese-made Babm, but most subsequent constructed language makers have avoided this taxonomic or hierarchic design for the reasons mentioned above.

== Alphabet and pronunciation ==
Ro is written with the Latin alphabet. The letters C, J, Q and X are pronounced as: /ʃ/, /ʒ/, /ŋ/ and /χ/ respectively. The vowels (A, E, I, O and U) are pronounced as in the Spanish language.

== Sample text ==
The following sample is from Esperanto, Elvish, and Beyond: The World of Constructed Languages. It is the last stanza of William Cullen Bryant's "Thanatopsis" translated into Ro by Foster himself:

Asi lib, ut avit ace vodas,
Em kep eb cok zudod pibaf av keb
Id bofwo dacagz ov bocnap, avid
Ak hek dugac in dufalz ov lobu
Ac en ket iqk futoq rambar taji,
Paksolo id datag, ub, poboso
Ip en mojop rigam, kidjeb lotmag
Iqk ra av dimgef doqab ov dodac
Ip ad, ud mobem id lastom rivalz.

== Encoding ==
Ro has been assigned the codes qro and art-x-rooo in the ConLang Code Registry.
