= Mondial language =

International auxiliary language

Mondial
- Created by: Helge Heimer
- Date: early 1940s
- Purpose: Constructed language: Mondial

Language codes
- ISO 639-3: None (mis)
- Glottolog: None
- IETF: art-x-mondial

Mondial, not to be confused with Nov-Esperanto, is an international auxiliary language created by the Swedish school principal Helge Heimer, in the early 1940s. It received favourable reviews from several academic linguists but achieved little practical success. Grammars and dictionaries were published in Swedish, French, English, Italian, and German.

== Orthography ==
Mondial uses 26 letters of the ISO basic Latin alphabet, where k and w only occur in proper nouns and loan words.

Mondial alphabet (+ digraphs)
Number	1	2	3	4	5	6	7	8	9	10	11	12	13	14	15	16	17	18	19	20	21	22	23	24	25	26	-	-
Upper case	A	B	C	D	E	F	G	H	I	J	K	L	M	N	O	P	Q	R	S	T	U	V	W	X	Y	Z	CH	QU
Lower case	a	b	c	d	e	f	g	h	i	j	k	l	m	n	o	p	q	r	s	t	u	v	w	x	y	z	ch	qu
IPA phoneme	a	b	k, ts	d	e	f	g, d͡ʒ	h	i	d͡ʒ	k	l	m	n	o	p	k	r	s	t	u	v	w	ks	j, i	t͡s	t͡ʃ	k

- k, w occur only in proper nouns and loanwords
- q only in qu, and that only before e and i

== Grammar ==
=== Tonic accent ===
The tonic accent in Mondial in general falls on the penultimate syllable in words that end in a vowel or s:

- amico, idea, il amara, amicos, ideas, doctores.

on the last syllable in nouns that end with a consonant other than s:

- doctor, general, american.

A diphthong counts as one syllable:

- patria, vidua, patrias, viduas, il amaria.

Exceptions to this show the placing of the tonic accent with an accent:

- veritá, café.

=== Pronouns ===
Person	Nominative		Oblique		Possessive	
Person	English	Mondial	English	Mondial	English	Mondial
1st singular	I	yo	me	me	my	mi
2nd singular	you	tu	you	te	your	tui (or votre)
3rd singular (male)	he	il	him	lui	his	sui
3rd singular (female)	she	el	her	lei	her	sei
3rd singular (neuter)	it	il	it	lo	its	sui
1st plural	we	nu	us	nos	our	nostre
2nd plural	you	vu	you	vos	your	vostre
3rd plural	they	li	them	les	their	lor

The reflexive, third person singular pronoun (himself, herself, itself) is se. The pronoun su means "her own", "his own" or "its own".

Note that the third person singular possessive is the same for both masculine and neuter (sui). Votre can be used as second person singular possessive as a respectful form.

=== Verbs ===
Verbs conjugate as follows, using savar (to know) as an example:

- Infinitive: -ar (savar, to know)
- Present participle: -ante (savante, knowing)
- Past participle: -ate (savate, known)
- Present: -a (yo sava, I know)
- Imperfect: -avi (yo savavi, I knew)
- Simple future: -ara (yo savara, I will know)
- Present conditional: -aria (yo savaria, I would know)
- Imperative: -a (sava!, know!)
- Imperative plural: -amo (savamo!, let us know!)

Verbs do not conjugate by person: yo, tu, il, nu, vu, li sava (I, you, he, we, you, they know).

Mondial has a single irregular verb, the verb ser (to be):

- Infinitive: ser (to be)
- Present participle: sente (being)
- Past participle: sete (been)
- Present: e (is/am/are)
- Imperfect: evi (was)
- Simple future: sera (will be)
- Present conditional: seria (would be)
- Imperative: se! (be!)
- Imperative plural: semo! (let us be!)

The auxiliary verb har (have) is used in much the same way as English, conjugating in the same way as the above plus the past participle of the main verb:

- har savate (to have known)
- hante savate (having known)
- yo ha savate (I have known)
- yo havi savate (I had known)
- yo hara savate (I will have known)
- yo haria savate (I would have known)

Passive voice is formed with the auxiliary verb var and the past participle of the main verb:

- yo va savate (I am known)
- yo vavi savate (I was known)
- yo ha vate savate (I have been known)
- yo havi vate savate (I had been known)
- yo vara savate (I will be known)
- yo hara vate savate (I will have been known)
- yo varia savate (I would be known)
- yo haria vate savate (I would have been known)
- va savate! (be known!)
- vamo savate! (let us be known!)
- var savate (to be known)
- har vate savate (to have been known)
- vante savate (being known)
- hante vate savate (having been known)

The verb to be (ser) can be used in the same way as var when no ambiguity arises:

- Il e / va savate da tutes

(He is known by all)

An example of where var and ser cannot be used interchangeably:

- Le porte va uvrate a tri hores

(The door is opened at three o'clock – passive)

- Le porte e uvrate a tri hores

(The door is open at three o'clock – state of being)

== Sample ==
Tristan Bernard, le autor humoristique, havi un dia prendate place con un amico in un vagon de primer clase por andar a Versalies. Il alumavi imediatemente un bon cigar, que il comenzavi da fumar con visible satisfacion. Alor un senior entravi i dicavi in un ton iritante a Tristan Bernard da gectar le cigar o da andar in un altere compartimente. Nul response. Le senior inconosate repeta su demande, ma in van. Fuor se de indignacion, il precipita se fuor del compartimente i returna algue momentes dopo con le conductor.

"Cel senior ha nulo da dicar ci", dicavi alor Tristan Bernard, "il ha un biliete de secunde clase, i cil e le primer clase." Confuse i furiose, le pasagero devavi presentar su biliete al conductor i acompaniar lui imediatemente a un compartimente de secunde clase. Cuando li havi andate se, le amico de Tristan Bernard questionavi lui come il havi povate savar que lo evi un biliete de secunde clase.

"Il saliavi del poche de sui gilete", respondavi Tristan Bernard, i yo vidavi que il evi del mem color que le mi."

=== Translation ===
Tristan Bernard, the humorist, one day sat with a friend in a first-class carriage to Versailles. He immediately lit a good cigar, which he began to smoke with visible satisfaction. Then, a gentleman entered and told Tristan Bernard, in an irritating tone, to put out his cigar or to go to another compartment. No response. The gentleman, becoming angry, repeated his request, but in vain. Beside himself with indignation, he quickly left the compartment and returned several moments later with the conductor.

"This gentleman has nothing to say here," said Tristan Bernard then; "he has a second-class ticket, and this is first class." Confused and angry, the passenger had to present his ticket to the conductor and accompany him immediately to a second-class compartment. When they had gone, Tristan Bernard's friend asked him how he could have known that the other passenger had a second-class ticket.

"It came out of his vest pocket," answered Tristan Bernard, "and I saw that it was the same color as mine."
