= Arcaicam Esperantom =

Constructed dialect of Esperanto

Archaic Esperanto
- Arcaicam Esperantom
- Pronunciation: arka'ikam espe'rantom
- Created by: Manuel Halvelik
- Date: around 1969
- Purpose: Constructed language: International auxiliary language; Esperanto; Esperantido; Archaic Esperanto
- Writing system: Latin, Fraktur
- Signed forms: Signuno

Language codes
- ISO 639-3: –
- Glottolog: None
- IETF: eo-arkaika

Arcaicam Esperantom or Arqhaicam Esperantom (English: Archaic Esperanto; Esperanto: arĥaika Esperanto, arkaika Esperanto), is a constructed auxiliary sociolect for translating literature into Esperanto created to act as a fictional 'Old Esperanto', in the vein of languages such as Middle English or the use of Latin citations in modern texts.

It was created by linguist Manuel Halvelik as part of a range of stylistic variants including Gavaro (slang) and Popido (patois), forming Serio La Sociolekta Triopo.

Halvelik also compiled a scientific vocabulary closer to Greco-Latin roots and proposed its application to fields such as taxonomy and linguistics. He gave this register of Esperanto the name Uniespo (Uniëspo, Universala Esperanto, 'Universal Esperanto').

The idea of an "old Esperanto" was proposed by the Hungarian poet Kálmán Kalocsay who in 1931 included a translation of the Funeral Sermon and Prayer, the first Hungarian text (12th century), with hypothetic forms as if Esperanto were a Romance language deriving from Vulgar Latin.

== La Sociolekta Triopo ==
La Sociolekta Triopo (the sociolect triple) does not create new Esperantidos (e.g. Esperanto II), but its sole purpose—including Arcaicam Esperantom—is to reflect styles in literature translated into Esperanto, like the Berlin Middle-German dialect spoken by characters in Carl Zuckmayer's Captain of Köpenick (Popido), or ancient styles in Walter Scott's Ivanhoe (Arcaicam Esperantom).

La Sociolekta Triopo thus constitutes not three new constructed languages, but constructed auxiliary sociolects for Esperanto, understandable by every reader of Esperanto but still providing the stylistic differences between dialects (Popido), slang (Gavaro), and ancient forms contrasting with Fundamento, standard Esperanto, e.g. in works of Mark Twain (slang and southern dialect) or The Lord of the Rings (Arcaicam Esperantom for the elves, Popido for the Hobbits).

== Differences from Esperanto ==
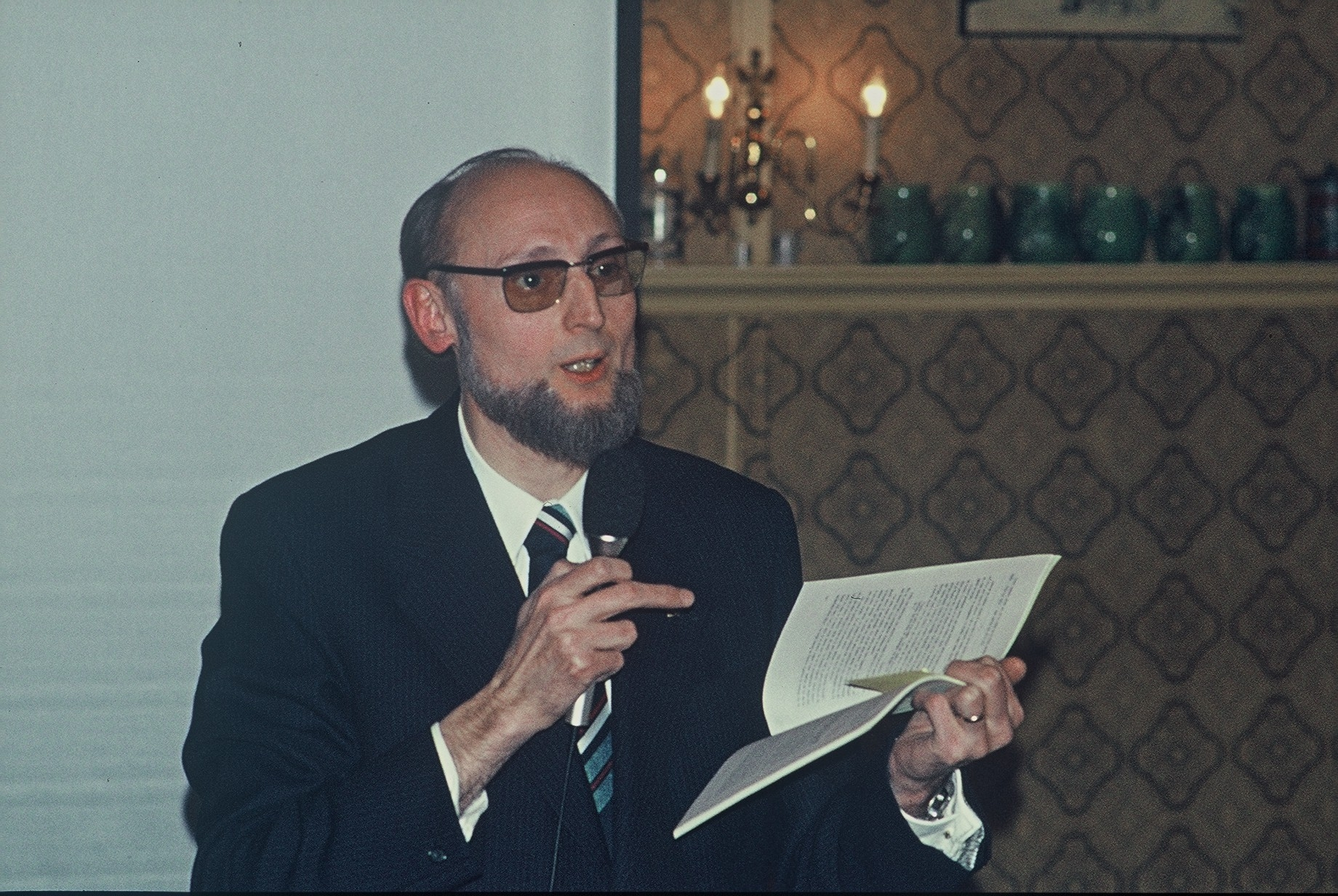
Manuel Halvelik in 1975.

=== Spelling ===
Esperanto/Arcaicam esperantom spellings
Esperanto	Arcaicam Esperantom
c	tz
ĉ	ch
f	ph
ĝ	gh
ĥ	qh
j	y
ĵ	zh
ŝ	sh
v	w

The three following rules are also added:

- g becomes gu (before e, i) or g (before other letters)
- k becomes qu (before e, i) or c (before other letters)
- ŭ becomes ù (but see below regarding -aŭ adverbs)

==== diphthongs ====
- aŭ becomes aù (but see below regarding -aŭ adverbs)
- eŭ becomes eù

==== consonant clusters ====
- dz becomes zz
- ks becomes x
- kv becomes cù

==== Typography ====
Halvelik recommends blackletter and uncial types.

=== Pronouns ===
Pronouns are changed as:

Pronouns—Arcaicam Esperantom compared to Esperanto
English	Esperanto	Arcaicam Esperantom
I	mi	mihi
thou/you (singular)	ci	tu
he	li	lùi
she	ŝi	eshi
it	ĝi	eghi
we	ni	nos
you (plural)	vi	wos
they	ili	ilùi
Reflexive pronoun (pronoun)+self*	si	sihi

*herself/himself/itself/themselves

- There is an old pronoun egui which is a personal, sex-neutral pronoun. Its intended use is for referring to deities, angels, animals etc.

=== Verbs ===
- The infinitive ends in -ir, rather than in the -i of modern Esperanto. Ex.: fari becomes pharir.
- The verb endings change according to the subject. So it is not necessary to write the subject pronoun, where there is no ambiguity.

Example: the modern Esperanto verb esti (to be), present tense:

- mi/ci/li/ŝi/ĝi/si/ni/vi/ili estas

The Arcaicam Esperantom verb estir (to be), present tense:

- (mihi) estams
- (tu) estas
- (lùi/eshi/eghi/egui) estat
- (nos) estaims
- (wos) estais
- (ilùi) estait

The other verb tenses behave the same way, as does the conditional mood:

- The future-tense conjugation estos becomes estoms, etc.
- The past-tense conjugation estis becomes estims, etc.
- The conditional-mood conjugation estus becomes estums, etc.

The imperative mood behaves differently from that pattern:

- The imperative form estu stays estu for singular subjects, but becomes estuy for plural subjects.

=== Nominals ===
Language	Nominative		Accusative		Dative		Genitive
Language	singular	plural	singular	plural	singular	plural	singular	plural
Arcaicam Esperantom	~om	~oy	~on	~oyn	~od	~oyd	~es	~eys
Esperanto	~o	~oj	~on	~ojn	al x~o	al x~oj	de ~o	de ~oj

- -o becomes om (sg. noun, nominative)
- -oj becomes oy (pl. noun, nominative)
- -on stays -on (sg. noun, accusative). Where Esperanto has a direction accusative, the dative is used. E.g.: Esperanto: Tiu virino la drinkemulon venordonis antaŭ la tribunalon, lit. 'That woman ordered the drunkard to come before the tribunal' becomes Ityu Wirinnom Drinquemulon wenordiguit [sic] antez Tribunalod.
- -ojn becomes -oyn (pl. noun, accusative)
- al x-o becomes x-od (sg. noun, dative – ex.: al domo becomes domod)
- al x-oj becomes x-oyd (pl. noun, dative – ex.: al domoj becomes domoyd)
- de x-o becomes x-es (sg. noun, genitive – ex.: de domo becomes domes)
- de x-oj becomes x-eys (pl. noun, genitive – ex.: de domoj becomes domeys)
- -e becomes -œ (adverb) (This is a new phoneme, not present in modern Esperanto. It is pronounced like the German ö.)
- -aŭ becomes -ez (-aŭ-adverb such as baldaŭ, etc.)
- -a becomes -am (sg. adjective, nominative)
- -aj becomes -ay (pl. adjective, nominative)
- A noun is always written with a capital letter. Ex: Glawom = (la) glavo.
- The verb infinitive can function as a noun, having the meaning that is carried in modern Esperanto by the root with the suffix -ado. The infinitive functioning as a noun takes, as does any other noun, both a capital letter and a case ending. Ex: Leguirom = (la) legado.
- The declension of personal pronouns below, however, differs significantly from declensions of nouns or adjectives. These personal pronouns have their own adjectival forms.

English	Cases				Adjectival form
English	Nominative	Genitive	Accusative	Dative	Adjectival form
I	mihi	mihes	mihin	mihid	mihiam
you (sg.)	tu	tues	tuin	tuid	tuam
he	lùi	lùies	lùin	lùid	lùiam
she	eshi	eshies	eshin	eshid	eshiam
it	eghi	eghies	eghin	eghid	eghiam
we	nos	noses	nosin	nosid	nosam
you (pl.)	wos	woses	wosin	wosid	wosam
they	ilùi	ilùies	ilùin	ilùid	ilùiam
(possessive pron.) + -self	sihi	sihes	sihin	sihid	sihiam

=== Correlatives ===
- ki- becomes cuy-
- ti- becomes ity-
- i- becomes hey-
- neni- becomes nemy-
- ĉi- becomes chey-
- ali- becomes altri-

(Note: Ali-, which in modern Esperanto is not a correlative despite its use in that fashion by some, becomes in Arcaicam Esperantom as altri- a full-fledged correlative.)

- -o becomes -om
- -a becomes -am
- -am becomes -ahem
- -e becomes -œ
- -om becomes -ohem
- (-u stays -u)
- (-el stays -el)
- the particle ĉi becomes is- (ĉi tiu = isityu)

=== Articles ===
- The definite article la does not exist in Arcaicam Esperantom. If necessary, a specific person or object can be indicated by means of ityu (in modern Esperanto tiu).
- The indefinite article, which modern Esperanto does not have, does exist in Arcaicam Esperantom. The indefinite article is unn (which is the same word for the number 1).

== Examples ==
=== The Lord's Prayer ===
Patrom nosam, cuyu estas in Chielom,
Estu sanctiguitam Tuam Nomom.
Wenu Tuam Regnom,
Plenumizzu Tuam Wolom,
Cuyel in Chielom, ityel anquez sobrez Terom.
Nosid donu hodiez Panon nosan cheyutagan,
Ed nosid pardonu nosayn Pecoyn,
Cuyel anquez nos ityuyd cuyuy contrez nos pecait pardonaims.
Ed nosin ned conducu in Tentod,
Sed nosin liberigu ex Malbonom.
Amen.

Version with cognates in standard Esperanto:

Patro nia, kiu estas en Ĉielo,
Estu sanktigita Cia Nomo.
Venu Cia regno,
Plenumiĝu Cia volo
Kiel en Ĉielo, tiel ankaŭ sur Tero.
Al ni donu hodiaŭ panon nian ĉiutagan,
Kaj al ni pardonu niajn pekojn
Kiel ankaŭ ni tiujn, kiuj kontraŭ ni pekas, pardonas.
Kaj nin ne konduku en tenton
Sed nin liberigu el malbono.
Amen.

=== Romeo and Juliet ===
Arcaicam Esperantom

Sed haltu: cuyam Lumom ityun Phenestron
Traradiat? Yemen Orientom,
Ed Yulieta memes Sunom estat!
Lewizzu, belam Sunom, ed mortigu
Enwian Lunon, cuyu tristœ palat,
Char tu, Serwantom eshiam, yamen
Plid belam ol eshi memes estas. Ned estu plud
Eshiam Serwantom, se eshi tuin enwiat:
Eshiam westalam Robom werdam
Ed malsanetzam estat, ed solœ Pholuloy
Wolontœ eghin portait. Eghin phorjetu.
Yemen Damom miham; ho, yemen Amom miham!
Se solœ ityon eshi stziut!

Esperanto: Romeo kaj Julieta

Sed haltu: kia lumo tiun fenestron
Traradias? Jen oriento
Kaj Julieta mem suno estas!
Leviĝu, bela Suno, kaj mortigu
Envian Lunon, kiu triste palas,
Ĉar ci, servanto ŝia, jam
Pli bela ol ŝi mem estas. Ne estu plu
Ŝia servanto, se ŝi cin envias:
Ŝia vestala robo verda
Kaj malsaneca estas, kaj sole frenezuloj
Volonte ĝin portas. Ĝin forĵetu.
Jen mia Damo; ho, jen mia amo!
Se sole tion ŝi scius!

Shakespeare: R&J II, 2 (Lines rearranged to correspond)

But, soft ! what light through yonder window
breaks? / It is the east,
and Juliet is the sun! — /
Arise, fair sun, and kill
the envious moon, / Who is [already] sick and pale with grief, /
That thou her maid (yet)
art [far] more fair than she: / Be [not] (no more)
her maid, since she is envious; /
Her vestal livery [is but sick and green], (green
and sick is) / And none but fools
(willingly) do wear it; cast it off. — /
It is my lady; O, it is my love! /
O, that she knew she were! —

=== Phrases ===
- Salutoyn cheyuyd! Cuyel phartais wos? –'Hello everyone, how are you?'
- Lùi ex Byelostocom wenat. – 'He comes from Białystok.'
- Cuyel nomizzas? – 'What is your name?'
- Nomizzams Petrus. – 'My name is Peter.'
- Ityon comprenams bonœ. – 'I understand that well.'
- Unn Manom altrian Manon lawat. – 'One hand washes the other (hand).'
- Tempom phughat. – 'Tempus fugit' (Vergil)
- Ityel pasat mondes Glorom. – 'Sic transit gloria mundi' (Thomas à Kempis)
- Wenims, widims, wenquims. – 'Veni, vidi, vici' (Julius Caesar)
- Homom Homoyd Lupom estat. – 'Homo homini lupus' (Plautus)

== See also ==
- Proto-Esperanto
- Esperantido
