= Esperantido =

Type of constructed language based on Esperanto

An Esperantido (plural Esperantidoj) is a constructed language derived from Esperanto. Esperantido originally referred to the language which is now known as Ido. The word Esperantido contains the affix (-ido), which means a "child (born to a parent), young (of an animal) or offspring". Hence, Esperantido literally means an 'offspring or descendant of Esperanto'. The term was coined by Claus Killing-Günkel.

A number of Esperantidoj have been created to address a number of perceived flaws or weaknesses in Esperanto (or in other Esperantidoj) by attempting to improve the lexicon, grammar, pronunciation, or orthography. Others were created as language games or to add variety to Esperanto literature.

== Language reforms ==
These attempted improvements were intended to replace Esperanto. Limited suggestions for improvement within the framework of Esperanto, such as orthographic reforms and riism, are not considered Esperantidos. (Note: Some of the more common letter substitutions are: The English and French values of ts, w, and y for c, ŭ, and j, and either English zh and j or French j and dj for ĵ and ĝ; X for ĥ, reflecting its use in Spanish and the IPA; other proposals follow common usage and eliminate the rare letter ĥ entirely, and use x for ks and kz; Qu for kv; Single letters for the fricatives and digraphs for the affricates. Generally in such proposals j and dj stand in for ĵ and ĝ ([ʒ] and [dʒ]). For ŝ and ĉ ([ʃ] and [tʃ]), there are two principal approaches, either c or x for ŝ and therefore either tc or tx for ĉ. The c, tc approach is reminiscent of French ch, tch for the same values, while the x, tx approach is found in Basque and to a lesser extent in Catalan and Portuguese (with tx in native Brazilian names).)

=== Mundolinco ===
Mundolinco (1888) was the first Esperantido, created in 1888. Changes from Esperanto include combining the adjective and adverb under the suffix -e, loss of the accusative and adjectival agreement, changes to the verb conjugations, eliminating the diacritics, and bringing the vocabulary closer to Latin, for example with superlative -osim- to replace the Esperanto particle plej "most".

=== 1894 Esperanto reform project ===
Zamenhof himself proposed several changes in the language in 1894, which were rejected by the Esperanto community and subsequently abandoned by Zamenhof himself.

=== Ido ===
Ido (1907), the foremost of the Esperantidos, sought to bring Esperanto into closer alignment with Western European expectations of an ideal language, based on familiarity with French, English, and Italian. Reforms included changing the spelling by removing diacritics used in alphabet such as ĉ and re-introducing the k/q orthographic distinction; removing a couple of the more obscure phonemic contrasts (one of which, [x], has been effectively removed from standard Esperanto); ending the infinitives in -r and the plurals in -i like Italian; eliminating adjectival agreement, and removing the need for the accusative case by setting up a fixed default word order; reducing the amount of inherent gender in the vocabulary, providing a masculine suffix and an epicene third-person singular pronoun; replacing the pronouns and correlatives with forms more similar to the Romance languages; adding new roots where Esperanto uses the antonymic prefix mal-; replacing much of Esperanto's other regular derivation with separate roots, which are thought to be easier for Westerners to remember; and replacing much of the Germanic and Slavic vocabulary with Romance forms, such as navo for English-derived ŝipo. See the Ido Pater noster below.

=== Saussure ===
René de Saussure (brother of linguist Ferdinand de Saussure) published numerous Esperantido proposals, starting with a response to Ido later called Antido 1 ("Anti-Ido 1") in 1907, which increasingly diverged from Esperanto before finishing with a more conservative Esperanto II in 1937. Esperanto II replaced j with y, kv with qu, kz with x, and diacritic letters with j (ĵ and ĝ), w (ŭ), and digraphs sh (ŝ), ch (ĉ); replaced the passive in -iĝ- with -ev-, the indefinite ending -aŭ with adverbial -e, the accusative -on on nouns with -u, and the plural on nouns with -n (so membrun for membrojn "members"); dropped adjectival agreement; broke up the table of concords, changed other small grammatical words such as ey for kaj "and", and treated pronouns more like nouns, so that the plural of li "he" is lin rather than ili "they", and the accusative of ĝi "it" is ju.

=== Adjuvilo ===
Adjuvilo is a constructed language created in 1910 by Claudius Colas under the pseudonym of "Profesoro V. Esperema". Although it was a full language, it may not have been created to be spoken. Many believe that as an Esperantist, Colas created Adjuvilo to help create dissent in the then-growing Ido movement. Colas himself called his language simplified Ido and proposed several reforms to Ido. Colas created a nearly complete grammar, but did not create a new vocabulary. Adjuvilo uses mainly the vocabulary of Ido with modifications according to the grammatical changes of Ido. Colas in some cases reestablishes the Esperanto forms of words and even constructed some new words like sulo for "sun" (Ido/Esperanto: suno) and dago for "day" (Ido: dio, Esperanto: tago).

==== Phonology and orthography ====
Like Ido, Adjuvilo has five vowel phonemes. The vowels e and ɛ are interchangeable depending on speaker preference, as are o and ɔ. The combinations /au/ and /eu/ become diphthongs in word roots but not when adding affixes.

==== Comparison to Ido ====
- Adjuvilo completely eliminates a special ending for the accusative case, whereas in Ido it was still used in sentences beginning with the object.
- Adjuvilo uses the plural ending also for adjectives, the definite article and all pronouns.
- Adjuvilo uses as plural ending -s and not -i as Ido.
- Adjuvilo replaces the Ido infinitive ending -ar by the Esperanto form -i. The infinitive forms of the different tenses in Ido were completely abolished.
- Adjuvilo completely abolishes the synthetic passive voice form of the verbs by a compound form of the auxiliary verb "to be" and the corresponding participle.
- Adjuvilo changes the Ido system of affixes by creating new affixes, omitting some and modifying some existing ones.
- Adjuvilo changes many pronouns of Ido.
- The accent in Adjuvilo is always on the penultimate syllable, as in Esperanto.
- Colas also announced changes to the vocabulary without elaborating this completely. Example: ucelo → avio (bird), hano → galo (chicken), hanino → galino (hen), dio → dago (day), deo → dio (god), kelka → alguna (some), ceno → sceno (scene), kam → quam (than), kin → quin (five), non → nov (nine), kande → quande (when), pro quo → quare (why), kad → num (interrogative particle), di → de (of), suno → sulo (sun), ol → it / lo

=== Romániço ===
Romániço (1991) is an Esperantido that uses only Romance language vocabulary. Its name derives from the Latin word romanice, an adjective meaning "in a Romance language". Unlike Interlingua, it uses the immediate source forms of words in modern Romance languages, so its spellings resemble Latin in most cases. It replaces all of Esperanto's non-Romance vocabulary and some of its grammar with Romance constructions, allows a somewhat more irregular orthography, and eliminates some criticized points such as case, adjectival agreement, verbal inflection for tense and mood, and inherent gender, but retains the o, a, e suffixes for parts of speech and an agglutinative morphology. Additionally, Romániço uses the digraphs çh (ĉ), kh (ĥ), sh (ŝ), and th (no Esperanto equivalent; represents a voiceless dental fricative ⟨θ⟩ or an aspirated voiceless alveolar plosive ⟨tʰ⟩).

=== Esperanto sen Fleksio ===
Esperanto sen Fleksio (Esperanto without inflexion), proposed under this name by Richard Harrison in 1996 but based on long-term complaints from Asian Esperantists, is an experimental and unfinished proposal for a morphologically reduced variety of Esperanto. The main changes are:

- Loss of the plural (the suffix -j), except in the new plural definite article laj (short for la jo) and possibly in a plural accusative preposition naj; singular number is marked by unu or la, plural by the new words jo and laj (la jo) (and maybe naj)
- Replacement of the accusative case (the suffix -n) with either subject–verb–object word order or with a new preposition na for other word orders
- Loss of verb tense: past, present, and future are all subsumed under the infinitive ending -i, though the imperative, conditional, and a single active and passive participle (-anta and -ita) remain
- Shift from copula-plus-adjective to verb, for example boni instead of esti bona. This usage also exists in standard Esperanto.

In an earlier version, the letter ŭ was replaced with w, but the more recent version uses the same alphabet as regular Esperanto.

=== Poliespo ===
While most Esperantidos aim to simplify Esperanto, Poliespo ("polysynthetic Esperanto", c. 1993) makes it considerably more complex. Besides the polysynthetic morphology, it incorporates much of the phonology and vocabulary of the Cherokee language. It has fourteen vowels, six of them nasalized, and three tones.

== Esperantidoj for amusement ==
There are also extensions of Esperanto created primarily for amusement.

=== Universal ===
One of the more unorthodox Esperantidoj, grammatically, is Universal (1923–1928). It adds a schwa to break up consonant clusters, marks the accusative case with a nasal vowel, has inclusive and exclusive pronouns, uses partial reduplication for the plural (tablo "table", tatablo "tables"), and inversion for antonyms (mega "big", gema "little"; donu "give", nodu "receive"; tela "far", leta "near"). Inversion can be seen in:

Al gefinu o fargu kaj la egnifu o grafu.
He finished reading [lit. 'to read'] and she started to write.

The antonyms are al "he" and la "she" (compare li "s/he"), the ge- (completive) and eg- (inchoative) aspects, fin- "to finish" and nif- "to begin", and graf- "to write" and farg- "to read".

The Universal reduplicated plural and inverted antonyms are reminiscent of the musical language Solresol.

=== Esperant' ===
Esperant' (c. 1998) is a style of speech that twists but does not quite violate the grammar of Esperanto.

The changes are morphological:

- The nominal suffix -o is removed, as in poetry. Knabo becomes knab'.
- The plural ending -oj is replaced with the collective suffix -ar-. Knaboj becomes knabar'.
- Adjectives lose their -a suffixes and combine with their head nouns. Bela knabino becomes belknabin'.
- In direct objects, the accusative suffix -n is replaced with the preposition je. Knabon becomes je knab'.
- Verbs become nouns, and their erstwhile tense and mood suffixes move elsewhere:
  - This may be an adverb or prepositional phrase: donu hodiaŭ becomes hodiaŭu don', and estas en la ĉielo becomes est' ĉielas.
  - If the verb contains a valency suffix, this may detach from the verb: fariĝu becomes iĝu far'.
  - If none of these options is available, jen may be used as a placeholder: amas becomes jenas am'. The choice of where the tense suffix ends up is largely a stylistic choice.
- Subjects of the erstwhile verb take the preposition de if nouns, or become possessives if pronouns: knabo amas becomes am' de knab', and kiu estas becomes kies est'.
- The article la becomes l' whenever the preceding word ends in a vowel.

Example:

Boys love the pretty girl.

Esperanto: Knaboj amas la belan knabinon.

Esperant': Jenas am' de knabar' je l' belknabin'.

Literally, "Behold love of group of boys to the prettygirl."

See the Esperant' Pater noster below.

== Esperanto specializations ==
There are various projects to adapt Esperanto to specialized uses. Esperanto de DLT (1983) is one; it was an adaptation of Esperanto as a pivot language for machine translation.

== Esperantidoj used in literature ==
Esperanto has little in the way of the slang, dialectical variation, or archaisms found in natural languages. Several authors have felt a need for such variation, either for effect in original literature, or to translate such variation from national literature.

=== Dialects ===
Occasionally, reform projects have been used by Esperanto authors to play the role of dialects, for example standard Esperanto and Ido to translate a play written in two dialects of Italian.

=== La Sociolekta Triopo ===
Halvelik (1973) created Popido ("Popular Idiom") to play the role of a substandard register of Esperanto that, among other things, does away with much of Esperanto's inflectional system. For example, standard Esperanto

Redonu al tiu viro lian pafilon.
"Give that man back his gun."

is in Popido,

Redonu al tu vir la pistol.

("la" is the Popido equivalent of "lia"; the article in Popido is "lo")

In 1969, he published part I of the Sociolekto Triopo, Arkaika Esperanto to serve as equivalent to Middle English, Middle High German and the like.

A slang completes the trio, called Gavaro.

=== Archaism and Arcaicam Esperantom ===
Proto-Esperanto would theoretically fulfill the need for archaism, but too little survives for it to be used extensively, though Geraldo Mattos made some sonnets. Several items of the lexicon have become archaic. In 1931 Kálmán Kalocsay published a translation of the Funeral Sermon and Prayer, the first Hungarian text (12th century), in which he created fictitious archaic forms as though Esperanto were a Romance language deriving from Vulgar Latin.

Manuel Halvelik went further in 1969 with a book on Arcaicam Esperantom. Initially he studies the problem of introduced archaism and mentions earlier trials such as André Cherpillod's 1998 translation of a 1743 French treatise on defecation using non-standard spellings with q, w, x, ſ, Ottó Haszpra's translation La Enfermita Reĝedzino with accents and geminated consonants, Lastly, he lays out the grammar of a fictitious ancestor of modern Esperanto. It echoes Proto-Esperanto in a more complex set of inflections, including dative and genitive cases ending in -d and -es and separate verbal inflections for person and number, as well as "retention" of digraphs such as ph and tz, writing c for [k], and the use of the letters q, w, x, y.

== Comparison of Esperanto, Internasia, Ido, Esperant', and Arcaicam Esperantom ==
The Esperanto Pater noster follows, compared to the Internasia, Ido, Esperant' and Arcaicam Esperantom versions.

Esperanto

Patro nia, kiu estas en la ĉielo,
sanktigata estu via nomo.
Venu via regno,
fariĝu via volo,
kiel en la ĉielo, tiel ankaŭ sur la tero.
Nian panon ĉiutagan donu al ni hodiaŭ.
Kaj pardonu al ni niajn ŝuldojn,
kiel ankaŭ ni pardonas al niaj ŝuldantoj.
Kaj ne konduku nin en tenton,
sed liberigu nin de la malbono.

Internasia

May Patrico, cuiso isi en Sielo,
sanktea isu ema nomo.
Ema regno venu,
Ema volo isu farea,
Sur tero epro laso isi en sielo.
Donu moy cilo tago may taga pano
Kay pardonu moy may suldoy,
epro moy pardone may sulduloy.
Kay ne konduku moy en tento,
ekay liberigu moy de ebono.

Ido

Patro nia, qua esas en la cielo,
tua nomo santigesez;
tua regno advenez;
tua volo facesez
quale en la cielo tale anke sur la tero.
Donez a ni cadie l'omnidiala pano,
e pardonez a ni nia ofensi,
quale anke ni pardonas a nia ofensanti,
e ne duktez ni aden la tento,
ma liberigez ni del malajo.

Esperant'

Nipatr', kies est' ĉielas,
iĝu via nom' sankt'.
Viu la regnalven'.
Iĝu via la volfar',
kielas en la ĉiel', tiel ankaŭu surtere.
Hodiaŭu ĉiutagpandon' nin.
Kaju la pardon' al niofend',
kiel ankaŭas nipardon' al ofendintar' nia.
Kaju nea nia konduk' entent',
sedu nia la liberig' de l' malbon'.

Arcaicam Esperantom

Patrom nosam, cuyu estas in Chielom,
Estu sanctigitam Tuam Nomom.
Wenu Tuam Regnom,
Plenumizzu Tuam Wolom,
Cuyel in Chielom, ityel anquez sobrez Terom.
Nosid donu hodiez Panon nosan cheyutagan,
Ed nosid pardonu nosayn Pecoyn,
Cuyel anquez nos ityuyd cuyuy contrez nos pecait pardonaims.
Ed nosin ned conducu in Tentod,
Sed nosin liberigu ex Malbonom.

English

Our Father, Who art in heaven,
hallowed be Thy name;
Thy kingdom come;
Thy will be done
on earth as it is in heaven.
Give us this day our daily bread;
And forgive us our debts,
as we also have forgiven our debtors;
and lead us not into temptation,
but deliver us from evil.

Adjuvilo

Patro nosa, qua estan en cielos,
santa esten tua nomo;
advenen tua regno;
esten tua volo,
quale en cielos, tale anke sur la tero.
Nosa pano omnadaga donen a nos hodie;
nosas ofendos pardonen a nos;
quale nos pardonan a nosas ofendantos
e ne lasen nos fali en tento,
ma liberifen nos de malbono.

== See also ==
- Gender reform in Esperanto
