= Paul Steiner (language creator) =

Paul Steiner was a volapükist from Nuremberg, Germany (although some other sources claim that he was a high school teacher in Saverne. He was active in the Volapük movement, but at one point quit and in 1885 created his own constructed language, Pasilingua.
