= Afrihili =

Language

- Ɛl-Afrihili
- Created by: K. A. Kumi Attobrah
- Date: 1970
- Setting and usage: intended for use throughout Africa
- Purpose: constructed language: international auxiliary; zonal; Afrihili
- Sources: a posteriori language, derived primarily from Swahili and Akan

Language codes
- ISO 639-2: afh
- ISO 639-3: afh
- Glottolog: afri1275

Afrihili (Ni Afrihili Oluga 'the Afrihili language') is a constructed language designed in 1970 by Ghanaian historian K. A. Kumi Attobrah (Kumi Atɔbra) to be used as a lingua franca in all of Africa. The name of the language is a combination of Africa and Swahili. The author, a native of Akrokerri (Akrokɛri) in Ghana, originally conceived of the idea in 1967 while on a sea voyage from Dover to Calais. His intention was that "it would promote unity and understanding among the different peoples of the continent, reduce costs in printing due to translations and promote trade". It is meant to be easy for Africans to learn.

== Source languages ==
Afrihili draws its phonology, morphology and syntax from various African languages, particularly Swahili and Akan (Attobrah's native language). The lexicon covers various African languages, as well as words from many other sources "so Africanized that they do not appear foreign", although no specific etymologies are indicated by the author. However, the semantics is quite English, with many calques of English expressions, perhaps due to the strong English influence on written Swahili and Akan. For example, mu is 'in', to is 'to', and muto is 'into'; similarly, kupitia is 'through' (as in 'through this remedy'), paasa is 'out' (as in to go outside), and kupitia-paasa is 'throughout'—at least in the original, 1970 version of the language.

== Script and pronunciation ==
The language uses the Latin alphabet with the addition of two vowel letters, ⟨Ɛ ɛ⟩ and ⟨Ɔ ɔ⟩, which have their values in Ghanaian languages and the IPA, [ɛ] and [ɔ]. Foreign names are spelled out phonetically rather than in the original orthography, so for example 'Hastings' is spelled Hestins. There are two digraphs, ⟨ch⟩ and ⟨sh⟩, which have their English and Swahili values, [tʃ] and [ʃ]. J and y also have their English and Swahili values, [d͡ʒ] and [j]. Ng is not a digraph, but pronounced as in English finger, [ŋɡ].

Vowels are a ɛ e i ɔ o u. Doubled vowel letters appear to be sequences, not long vowels. Consonants are p t ch k, b d j g, m n ny, f s sh h, v z, l r y w.

There is no tone. Stress is on the second-last vowel. Exclamation marks come at the beginning of a clause, which ends in a comma or period as normal; question marks come at the end.

== Grammar ==
The grammar is similar to Swahili, but in addition there is the 'vowel triangle', which is central to Afrihili inflection:

             a
           /   \
          u     e           ɛ
         /       \          
        ɔ __ o __ i

Many grammatical processes are accomplished by exchanging a vowel with its directional opposite on the triangle: a for o, u for i, e for ɔ, and vice versa. For example, a verb can be made into an adjective by changing its final vowel in this manner: from pinu 'to determine' comes the adjective pini 'determinate'. Ɛ does not participate in these swaps, but is used in other situations (below).

All nouns, and only nouns and adjectives modifying nouns, begin with a vowel. In the singular this will be different from the final vowel of the word; the plural is formed by making it the same as the final vowel. For example, omulenzi 'boy' becomes imulenzi 'boys'; similarly, oluga is 'language' and aluga 'languages'.

=== Nouns ===
Nouns are derived from verbs or adjectives by prefixing the opposite of the final vowel, according to the triangle above. So, from pinu 'to determine' comes the noun ipinu 'determination'. If all the vowels in the verb or adjective are the same, as in mono 'to disgrace' and kana 'one', then the neutral vowel ɛ- is used: ɛmono 'a disgrace', ɛkana 'unity'.

Verbal nouns (gerunds) are formed from the infinitive in -de, and so always begin with ɔ- : soma 'reads', somade 'to read', ɔsomade yɛ papa 'reading is good'. (Compare ɔkaratide 'harvesting' and ukarati 'a harvest', from karati 'to harvest'.)

In the opposite direction, nouns drop their initial vowels to form verbs, and with the appropriate change in final vowel, adjectives. So, from etogo 'a house' comes togo (or togode) 'to house', and from umeme 'electricity' comes memɔ 'electric'.

=== Participles ===
Participles are formed with mɛ-, further derived as nouns or adjectives (gerunds): mɛpini 'determinative', ɛmɛwako 'driver' (wako to drive).

Verb phrases are formed with tense prefixes, with the subject pronouns written together with the verb. (Subject pronouns are not used if there is a noun subject.) Objects, however, are written separately after the verb: From jira 'to wait for', mingijira lε 'I (mi-) would have waited for him (lɛ)'.

=== Nominative pronouns ===
Pronouns include mi 'I', nɛ 'me and you', nɛu 'us and you', nu 'we' (not you), wu 'you (thou)' ku 'you (ye)', lɛ 'he', ta 'she', yo 'it', fu 'they'.

=== Possessive pronouns ===
For possession, pronouns are prefixed on a noun, dropping their vowel: l'arafi 'his letter', w'agoji 'your money'.

=== Tense prefixes ===
Tense prefixes include li- (past), ta- (future), lii- (habitual past), taa- (habitual future), yɛɛ- (habitual present), re- (present continuous -ing), ri- (past continuous -ing), ngi- (conditional, would), nge- (subjunctive, may), and a perfect in lo-. Simple present is not marked. U- forms relative clauses (who, which).

So, from du 'eat', lɛdu 'he eats', nɛtadu 'you & I will eat', fulidu 'they ate', miyɛɛdu ɛn zinga 'I eat in the morning (as a matter of habit)', miliidu ɛn zinga 'I would eat / used to eat in the morning', miredu 'I am eating', nuridu 'we were eating (when)', kama kungiwa, kungidu 'if y'all would come, you'd eat', ni omuntu lodu 'the man has eaten'.

=== Demonstrative pronouns ===
'This' and 'that' are ki and ka, which are pluralized with the suffix -nga, giving kinga 'these' and kanga 'those'. They may occur before a noun, or afterward by copying the final syllable:

Ki omulenzi, omulenzi kinzi 'this boy'
Ka omukama, omukama kama 'that king'
Imukazi kangazi 'those girls'

Some suffixes are full syllables, as -wi inchoative (to get or become): sana 'drink', sanawi 'get drunk'; furaha 'happy', furahawi 'be happy'. However, most have an echo vowel, identical to the final vowel of the root, as in -bw- (passive): bona 'see', bonabwa 'be seen'; or -t- '-able': bonata 'visible', dutu 'edible'.

'Of' (partitive?) is either a suffix -n or a particle pe, with opposite word order. Nun kisi or kisi pe nu 'some of us', imulenzin kisi or kisi pen imulenzi 'some of the boys' (the definite article ni is here reduced and suffixed to pe, giving pen).

When an adjective or numeral follows a noun, it takes the initial vowel of the noun as grammatical agreement, as well as the suffix -n:

oluga ozurin na opapan 'a pleasant and good language'
kana oluga, oluga okanan 'one language'

== Sample phrases ==
Zuri lu – Good day (alu 'a day')
Zuri zinga – Good morning
Zuri masa – Good afternoon
Zuri dani – Good evening
Zuri bali – Good night
Jo koni – Go at once
! Afuraho – Cheers!
Sama papa obeka al dude – Find a good place to eat
Kama mingipewa l'arafi gaba milijo paasa, mingijira lε. – If I had received his letter before I went out, I would have waited for him.

Kwaku na Akua mai atapiro atajirin wɛna liwa yide fu kusa. Ni atapiro atajirin mai imulezi ibarin wɛna yɛ f'amotsoala. Ni amotsoala yɛ arenobo kika Kwaku na Akua baitu fu duka yɛ ukuetu upapam tare.

Ku atapiro mai afu okisiwa so nehi nesa bɛ, na ni imao no inta tabonadi you. Fumai arafi f'amotsoala tɔ okisiwa.

== Text ==
The following text, from a 1971 newsletter, was clipped on its left margin. Missing words are in brackets.

Afrihili	English	glosses
Dɛna wungida?	What would you have done?	da – to do
Koda ni amɛgenda ɛn arabiyado, kɛna rigenda to Afrilikrom, rifunda kɛna lɛriwako harakalo ma, ni ɛmɛwako lidinga wakode harakalo.	Although the passengers in a lorry, which was travelling to Afrilikrom, were complaining that he was driving too fast, the driver continued to drive fast.	ni – the; genda – to travel; ɛn – in; arabiyado – a lorry/truck; kɛna – that, which; to – to; funda – to complain; wako – to drive; haraka – fast; ma – very? too; dinga – to continue
[?]rɛ lɛlundi ni ɛndɛmo mu, pɛna ni [arab]iyado luduri muto umuti ni uzo te.	He had almost arrived in the town, when the lorry ran into a tree beside the road.	lundi ? – arrive; ɛndɛmo – a town; mu – in; umuti – a tree; uzo – a road; te – beside
[?]amɛganda (earlier amɛgenda) bi lipewa apira na bi lifua. [Ni ɛ]mɛwako lipirabwa ko.	Some of the passengers received wounds and some died. The driver was not hurt.	bi – some, some or other; pira – to hurt/wound; fua – to die; ko – not
[?]uma rendeke tɛ adoncho tɛ ɛtaya, lɛliwa [na ?] eri ni arabiyado te na likukua, ! W'agoji [kam]a wufuaseko. ! W'agoji kama wufuaseko.	Instead of ringing for an ambulance for help, he came and stood beside the lorry and shouted, "Your money, if you are not dead! Your money if you are not dead!"	tɛ – for; adoncho – an ambulance; taya – to help; wa – to come; kukua – to shout; agoji – money; kama – if; -se (unidentified)
[Ka]na pe fu, ɛn reti yo lijika l'oliso na [?]nya lɛlifuase.	One of the passengers, on hearing this, closed his eyes and pretended he was dead.	kana – one; ti – to hear; yo – it; jika – to close; oliso – eyes;
Dɛna wungida wuriyɛ ka omuntu[?]	What would you have done if you were that man?	yɛ – to be; omuntu – a human
