= Babm =

International auxiliary language

- Pronunciation: [bɔˈɑːbɔmu]
- Created by: Rikichi (Fuishiki) Okamoto
- Date: 1962
- Setting and usage: international auxiliary language
- Users: None
- Purpose: constructed languages: int. auxiliary languages; Babm
- Sources: a priori language

Language codes
- ISO 639-3: qbb (unofficial)
- Glottolog: None
- IETF: art-x-babm

Babm (pronounced [bɔˈɑːbɔmu]) is an international auxiliary language created by the Japanese philosopher Rikichi Okamoto (Fisk Okmot), also known as Fuishiki Okamoto. Okamoto first introduced the language in his 1962 publication The Simplest Universal Auxiliary Language Babm. The language did not achieve widespread adoption, even within the constructed language community, and currently has no known speakers. The language uses the Latin script as a syllabary, and possesses no articles or auxiliary verbs. Each letter marks an entire syllable rather than a single phoneme. Babm adheres to a sound-based rule set, which Okamoto delineates in his book. He explains, "Nouns are coined from three consonants and one vowel, verbs from one or two vowels between two consonants at the beginning and at the end. Adjectives, adverbs, pronouns, numerals, and propositions have respectively their own peculiar form."

Babm shares with certain 17th-century constructed languages a primary emphasis on taxonomy, aiming to establish a universally consistent nomenclature for scientific concepts, including chemical compounds. This scientific focus distinguishes Babm from languages like Esperanto, which prioritize socio-political objectives. Nevertheless, Okamoto's 1962 treatise includes substantial discourse on world peace. The author aspired for his "simple" language to achieve universal utility and adoption.

== Phonology and orthography ==
Every consonant in Babm must be followed by a particular short vowel, with the exception of /k/ which can be followed by any vowel. Vowels that are attached to nouns are short vowels by default, and those not attached to nouns are long, but vowel length can be modified. Because of this, words have a basic CV structure with some vowel clusters but no consonant clusters.

Babm uses the Latin alphabet with 26 letters. Each letter of the alphabet represents said letter plus a short vowel. Written vowels represent long vowels. The consonant and vowel inventories are as follows (for the value of the signs, see International Phonetic Alphabet):

Consonant Inventory
	/–a/	/–e/	/–i/	/–o/	/–u/
/b–/	—N/a			⟨B b⟩	—N/a
/b–/	—N/a			/bo/	—N/a
/d–/	—N/a	⟨D d⟩	—N/a		
/d–/	—N/a	/de/	—N/a		
/f–/	—N/a				⟨F f⟩
/f–/	—N/a				/fu/
/ɡ–/	⟨G g⟩	—N/a			
/ɡ–/	/ga/	—N/a			
/h–/	⟨H h⟩	—N/a			
/h–/	/ha/	—N/a			
/j–/	—N/a				⟨Y y⟩
/j–/	—N/a				/ju/
/k–/	—N/a	⟨K k⟩	⟨X x⟩	⟨C c⟩	⟨Q q⟩
/k–/	—N/a	/ke/	/ki/	/ko/	/ku/
/l–/	—N/a	⟨L l⟩	—N/a		
/l–/	—N/a	/le/	—N/a		
/m–/	—N/a				⟨M m⟩
/m–/	—N/a				/mu/
/n–/	⟨N n⟩	—N/a			
/n–/	/na/	—N/a			
/p–/	—N/a	⟨P p⟩	—N/a		
/p–/	—N/a	/pe/	—N/a		
/r–/	⟨R r⟩	—N/a			
/r–/	/ra/	—N/a			
/s–/	—N/a	⟨S s⟩	—N/a		
/s–/	—N/a	/se/	—N/a		
/t–/	—N/a			⟨T t⟩	—N/a
/t–/	—N/a			/to/	—N/a
/v–/	—N/a		⟨V v⟩	—N/a	
/v–/	—N/a		/vi/	—N/a	
/w–/	⟨W w⟩	—N/a			
/w–/	/wa/	—N/a			
/z–/	—N/a		⟨J j⟩	⟨Z z⟩	—N/a
/z–/	—N/a		/zi/	/zo/	—N/a

Vowel Inventory
⟨A a⟩	⟨E e⟩	⟨I i⟩	⟨O o⟩	⟨U u⟩
/aː/	/eː/	/iː/	/oː/	/uː/

== Syntax ==
Okamoto provides limited information about the syntax, stating that "it is rather desirable that it [the sentence] be free from many rules of composition." The word order is SVO, with modifiers preceding the elements they modify.

The language exhibits some degree of analytic inflection: In sentences with complex structures, the subject, the direct object, and the indirect object can be distinguished through preceding "prepositional conjunctions." There is also a set of auxiliary-like elements that Okamoto terms "executive complements," which modify the verb in various ways and may occur either as suffixes or as separate words preceding the verb.

== Semantics ==
Okamoto's book provides a detailed dictionary, split up into a number of sections. In his text, Okamoto splits nouns up into nine sections: "Living Things", "Material Bodies", "Chemical Terms", "Expendables and Materials", "Durable Goods", "Human Body and Physiology", "Conscious Actions", "Structure of Living", and "Politics". Each of these sections is split into a number of sub-sections. The other parts of speech further split into smaller sections in the book are "Verbs", "Complements" and "Prepositional Conjunctions". Okamoto also includes a section for "Abridged Common Expressions" such as "Good evening!" and "Congratulations!"

== Morphology ==
In order to keep the language simple, Babm does not have articles or auxiliary verbs, and avoids the inflection of a basic word.

=== Nouns ===
As a rule, 4 letters make up a noun. Nouns have an initial short-sound letter which indicates meaning, usually followed by a long-sound letter which is pronounced long and with a strong accent. The third letter is also usually short-sound, and it indicates the sort of noun divided by meaning, although it can be long-sound as well. The final letter is also short-sound, and it specifies the noun. If a noun has two long-sound letters in the middle, the first is accentuated. Proper nouns should follow these guidelines, however one long-sound or one short-sound letter may be added before or after the word. c, lr, and qw are not permitted to be noun-initial, and l and w are avoided at the end of nouns.

Example nouns include babm (a universal language) and rboit [rabooːiːto] ("mother and father").

=== Verbs ===
Verbs have either 3 or 4 letters. They must start with a short-sound letter which indicates meaning and end with a short-sound letter. There can be one or two long-sound letters in the middle. One long-sound letter and the final short-sound letter correspond with their similar-sounding noun counterpart. On rare occasions, verbs may have three long-sound letters. The first long-sound letter and the third long-sound letter (if present) are accentually pronounced and the final short-sound letter is pronounced slightly strongly and distinctly.

Example: bean

=== Complements ===
Complements have less than three letters and are conducted by c. The complement is an adjective when modifying a noun or pronoun and an adverb when qualifying any other word. The suffix -w may also be added to adverbs to make it clearer. They generally end with a short-sound letter. l and w are avoided at the end of complements. Example: cefd (white)

=== Pronouns ===
Pronouns have four classes: personal pronoun, impersonal pronoun, relative pronoun, and interrogative pronoun.

Personal and impersonal pronouns:

First person	Second person	Third person	Impersonal
V - I va - we ov - I (male) ova - we (male) iv - I (female) iva - we (female)	Y - you (singular) ya - you (plural) oy - you (male) oya - you (plural) iy- you (female) iya - you (plural)	x - he or she xa - they ox - he oxa - they (male) ix - she ixa - they (female)	z - an object za - objects ez - that object eza - those objects iz - this object iza - these objects

Relative pronouns are based on lr, and interrogative pronouns are based on qw. Both of these are used as the subject or object. The beginning short-sound letter and the first long-sound letter are accented, and other long-sound letters are pronounced somewhat strongly and distinctly with a pause.

=== Prepositional conjunctions ===
The prepositional conjunction is one letter, a. It usually accompanies one or two long-sound letters before or after one short-sound letter and may be placed before any word, clause, or sentence.

=== Exclamations ===
Exclamations are two long-sounding letters and w may be added to the middle or end.

=== Affixes ===
Babm utilizes prefixes and suffixes to modify nouns, verbs, complements, and pronouns.

== Examples ==
[Babm:] V pajio ci htaj, lrid cga coig pegayx pe bamb [sic] ak cop pbagt.

[IPA:] /vi pa.aːziːóː koíː hato.áːzì | lera.iːde koɡa.áː ke.o.iːɡe pe.eɡa.áːjuki pe.éː bo.áːmubò áːkè ko.óːpè pebo.áːɡatò ‖/

[English:] I am reading this book, which is very interestingly written in Babm by a predominant scholar.

[Babm:] Dedh cjis beg kobp.

[IPA:] /de.éːdehà kozi.íːsè bo.éːɡà ke.óːbopè ‖/

[English:] Time causes youth to be old.

== Bibliography ==
- Okamoto, Rikichi [Fuishiki] (1962). Universal auxiliary language, Babm. Tokyo: The author. [Author appears as Fuishiki Okamoto.]
- Okamoto, Rikichi [Fuishiki] (1964). Sekaigogakuron. Tokyo: Minseikan. [In Japanese.]
