= Alexarchus (historian) =

Ancient Greek historian

Alexarchus or Alexarch (Greek: Ἀλέξαρχος) was an ancient Greek historian, who wrote a work on the history of Italy, of which Plutarch quotes the third book. Servius mentions an opinion of his respecting the origin of the names Epeirus and Campania, which unquestionably belonged to his work on Italy. The writer of this name, whom Plutarch mentions in another passage, is probably a different person.
