= Alexarchus of Corinth =

5th-century BC Greek general

Alexarchus or Alexarch (Greek: Ἀλέξαρχος) of Corinth was an ancient Greek general who, while the Lacedaemonians were fortifying Deceleia in Attica in 413 BC, and were sending an expedition to Sicily, was entrusted with the command of 600 hoplites, with whom he joined the Sicilian expedition.
