= Muhyi Gulshani =

Oghuz Turks scholar and author

Muhyi Muhammad Gulshani ibn Fath-Allah ibn Abu Talib, best known as Muhyi Gulshani (Note: Also spelled "Muhyî-i Gülşenî".) (born c. 1528 – died after 1606/7) was a Turkish scholar and author who worked and lived in the Ottoman Empire. He wrote in Turkish and Persian. Due to his excellent command of Persian, Gulshani was known to his Turkish contemporaries as Acem-i Küçük. (Note: Also spelled Ajam-e Kuchek. It translates as "Little Persian" (see Ajam for more information).) He was also known by the Turks as Acem Fethioglu, Muhyi Celebi and Dervish Muhyi. In addition to his literary output, Gulshani may have been the inventor of Balaibalan, a constructed language.

== Biography ==
Gulshani was born in Adrianople (modern Edirne) to a family originally from Shiraz and Qazvin in Iran, at a time when these cities were ruled by the Ak Koyunlu. Muhyi's grandfather, Abu Talib, lived in Iran during the reign of Uzun Hasan (1453–1478) and was killed during the conquest of the Ak Koyunlu realm by Shah Ismail I (r. 1501–1524). As a result of the political upheaval created by the rise of the Safavids, Abu Talib's son, Fath-Allah (Fethullah Effendi), moved to the Ottoman realm, and settled in Adrianople. He married in Adrianople and joined a scholarly and Sufi social netwerk that encompassed the cities of Adrianople, Cairo and Constantinople (modern Istanbul).

Muhyi attended the Üçşerefeli and Bayezid madrasas in Adrianople. In 1546, he moved to Constantinople to complete his education at the Sahn-i Seman madrasa. There, he attended lectures of contemporaneous scholars such as Ebussuud Efendi and Gelibolulu Süruri (died 1562). In 1552 he moved to Cairo in order to join his brother Muhammad (Mehmed) who served in the local Ottoman bureaucracy of Egypt. Gulshani became deputy judge in Egypt, and became a student of Ahmad Kayali (Ahmed-i Hayali; died 1569/70), son and successor of Shaykh Ibrahim Gulshani (founder of the Gulshani order). He stayed in Egypt until his death and functioned as custodian (turbedar) of the main Gulshani order hospice in Cairo.

In the Ottoman Empire, Gulshani's family were known as the Etmekçizadeler. Muhyi Gulshani married the daughter of Shaykh Ibrahim Gulshani.

== Literary output ==
Though Gulshani claimed to have written a hundred works, only 43 are extant. His Persian works include Ketab-e ma'ab and Ketab-e haqq al-yaqin. He wrote a divan mostly containing poems in Persian, but also include some in Turkish. His Alfiya-ye Muhyi, consists of a collection of ghazals in Persian and Turkish. (Note: This work has, at times, erroneously been ascribed to his son.) His Masader-e alsena-ye arba'a is a quadrillingual dictionary, in which Persian functions as the base, and equivalents to words are provided in Turkish, Arabic and Balibilen (the artificial language he created himself). Of Gulshani's extant works, 34 are in Turkish, including the Loghat va qawa'ed-e Balibilen, the Manaqeb-e Ibrahim Gulshani, and the Nafahat al-ashar.

== Sources ==
- Emre, Side (2017). Ibrahim-i Gulshani and the Khalwati-Gulshani Order: Power Brokers in Ottoman Egypt. Brill. ISBN 978-9004341371.
- Yazici, Tahsin (2002). "GOLŠANI, MOḤYI MOḤAMMAD". In Yarshater, Ehsan (ed.). Encyclopædia Iranica. Vol. XI/2: Golšani–Great Britain IV. London and New York: Routledge & Kegan Paul. p. 113. ISBN 978-0-933273-62-7.
