= Robot Interaction Language =

The Robot Interaction Language (ROILA) is the first spoken language created specifically for talking to robots. ROILA is being developed by the Department of Industrial Design at Eindhoven University of Technology. The major goals of ROILA are that it should be easily learnable by the user, and optimized for efficient recognition by robots. ROILA has a syntax that allows it to be useful for many different kinds of robots, including the Roomba, and Lego Mindstorms NXT. ROILA is free for anybody to use and to contribute to, as the team has released all documentation and tools under a Creative Commons license.

== History ==
ROILA was developed due to the need for a unified language for humans to speak to robots. The designers performed research into the ability of robots to recognize and interpret natural languages. They discovered that natural languages can be very confusing for robots to interpret sometimes, due to elements such as homophones and tenses. Based on this research, the team set out to create a genetic algorithm that would generate an artificial vocabulary in a way that would be easy for a human to pronounce. The algorithm used the most common phonemes from the most popular natural languages and created easy to pronounce words. The team took the results of this algorithm and formed the ROILA vocabulary.

== Language ==
ROILA has an isolating grammar, meaning that it doesn't have suffixes or prefixes added to words to change their meanings. Instead, these changes are constructed by adding word markers that specify what the changes are, such as the tense of the previous verb. For example, in English the suffix “ed” is added to a word to show that it is in the past tense, but in ROILA the marker word “jifi” is placed after the verb.

=== Alphabet ===
Below is the list of all letters and sounds used in ROILA:

Letter	IPA transcription	ARPABET transcription	Example
a	æ	AE	bat
e	ɛ	EH	red
i	ɪ	IH	big
o	ɔ	AO	frost
u	ʌ	AH	but
b	b	B	buy
f	f	F	for
j	dʒ	JH	just
k	k	K	key
l	l	L	late
m	m	M	man
n	n	N	no
p	p	P	pay
s	s	S	say
t	t	T	take
w	w	W	way

Of the 26 letters of the English alphabet, c, d, g, h, q, r, v, x, y, and z are not used.

=== Vocabulary ===
The vocabulary of ROILA was generated by an algorithm designed to create a vocabulary with the least confusion amongst words. Each word generated by this algorithm was assigned a basic meaning, as taken from Basic English. The words from Basic English that are used most frequently are assigned to the shortest ROILA words generated by the algorithm. A short list of words in ROILA is included below, along with their English meaning.

English Meaning	ROILA Word
air	wifawe
and	sowu
bad	topik
can	leto
cold	bosipu
end	pekot
fire	nejoj
give	bufo
hand	jiwos
inside	pawop
know	bati
left	webufo
man	losa
number	felit
outside	bajike
paper	banafu
right	besati
stay	tipet
talk	seni
use	seput
very; pluralizing particle	tuji
walk	fosit
word marker for future tense	jifo
word marker for past tense	jifi
you	bama

=== Grammar ===
ROILA was designed to have a regular grammar, with no exceptions to anything. All rules apply to all words in a part of speech. Due to the simple isolating type grammar of ROILA whole word markers are added following parts of speech to show the grammatical category. For example, a word marker placed after a verb type would apply a tense, while a word marker applied after a noun type would apply plurality. ROILA has five parts of speech: nouns, verbs, adverbs, adjectives, and pronouns. The only pronouns are I, you, he, and she. Sentences follow a subject–verb–object word order.

=== Examples ===
The following examples attempt to show what the syntax of the language looks like in various uses.

English	ROILA	Gloss
I love this fruit	Pito loki wikute	I love fruit
I love all fruits	Pito loki wikute tuji	I love fruit [word marker for plural]
You are a good person	Bama wopa tiwil	You good person
I walked to the house	Pito fosit jifi bubas	I walk [word marker for past tense] house
Do not listen to her	Buse lulaw mona	Don't listen to her

== Availability ==
ROILA is currently only available for the Lego Mindstorms NXT. It uses the CMU Sphinx speech recognition library to interpret spoken commands to the NXT, and transform them into ROILA commands.
