= Personal fulfillment =

Achievement of personal life goals

Personal fulfillment is achievement of life goals which are important to an individual, in contrast to the goals of society, family and other collective obligations.

Personal fulfillment is an ongoing journey for a human individual. It commences when an individual starts becoming conscious of oneself and one's surroundings. It is then that one's exploration begins to realize what one is capable of. Like the tentative steps of a child that invariably lead to a few falls followed by seeking for some help from people around. Then the joy of achievement when one can successfully take a few steps without falling. The appreciation of people around is a key component of achieving personal fulfillment. It is invariably followed by a sense of habituality (i.e., being able to perform any act, such as walking, habitually). Then boredom. Followed by a yearning for the next horizon, whatever it may be for an individual.

Key components then of personal fulfilment are:

1. Consciousness - of oneself and the environment
2. Consciousness - of people around oneself
3. Exploration - of something new that one may be capable of
4. Initial failure - as one's initial attempts at exploration leads to stumbles and falls
5. Trying - again and again till such time that one does not stumble and fall
6. Experiencing joy - of having tried and achieved something new
7. Commendation and applause - of those around, especially of the ones that the individual values
8. Boredom - as one performs the 'not so new anymore' task as a matter of habit
9. Then back to step three for something new to explore
10. The cycle continuing throughout one's life as the individual grows and expands into newer and unexplored dimensions of personal fulfilment

Consciousness is the quality or state of being aware of an external object or something within oneself. It has been defined as sentience, awareness, subjectivity, the ability to experience or to feel wakefulness, having a sense of selfhood, and the executive control system of the mind.

Consciousness of the self is a complex experience for an individual being. A prime aspect of consciousness and awareness of the self is the awakening to one's capabilities and potential.

The awakening to one's capabilities and potential is a continuous process throughout the period of existence of a being - from the birth of the physical being through the expiration of the same. Inherent to this process of being is a drive or a force that seems to be part and parcel of being in the physical being on earth. This drive manifests itself from the start of one's being - like a child crying as soon as it is born. It is the awakening of the child to its capabilities of exercising its vocal cords. The drive continues through the life of one's being (albeit in varying degrees of forcefulness and momentum at various points in time) through to death of the physical being as we know.

This drive is primal and is the single force that leads to exploration.
