= Kenneth Searight =

British writer (1883–1957)

- Born: Arthur Kenneth Searight; December 1883; Kensington, England, United Kingdom
- Died: 28 February 1957 (aged 73); Folkestone, England, United Kingdom
- Occupation: writer
- Known for: Inventor of Sona

Kenneth Searight (born Arthur Kenneth Searight; 15 November 1883 – 28 February 1957) was the creator of the international auxiliary language Sona. His book Sona; an auxiliary neutral language outlines the language's grammar and vocabulary. Encounters with Searight also influenced English author E.M. Forster's world-view, particularly with regard to soldiers.

Searight was born in Kensington, England in 1883. He attended Charterhouse School (a boarding school) for his childhood and teenage years. In 1904 he received a commission into the Queen's Own Western Kent Regiment, and was stationed for several years in India. It was here that he befriended English author E.M. Forster (A Passage to India) and Cambridge don G.L. Dickinson. His regiment was later reassigned to Iraq, and then to Egypt. Searight also enjoyed leave time around the Mediterranean Sea—especially in Italy.

It was during this extensive travel that Searight developed his interest in linguistics and his familiarity with Middle Eastern and Far Eastern languages and cultures. At one point in his military career he was classified as an interpreter competent in "Arabic, Baluchi, Persian and Pushtu."

Searight retired to Rome in 1926. In 1934 he contacted Charles Kay Ogden to discuss publishing the Sona book. Ogden was the creator of a modified version of English known as "Basic English", which consisted of a reduced vocabulary (only 850 words) and simplified grammar. Ogden was also the editor of the Psyche Miniatures series at Cambridge University, and he approved and published the Sona book, as well as writing an introduction for it.

Searight engaged in pederasty and pedophilia. He was also the author of six unpublished volumes of erotica, five of which were destroyed by a later owner in a moment of panic. The sixth survives: a 600-page manuscript work called the Paidikion. It was made up of homoerotic stories, a detailed listing of his sexual conquests with a total of 129 boys — the "Paidiology"— and a 137-page verse autobiography entitled "The Furnace".

There is some reason to believe that Searight was the model for the hero of Forster's novel Maurice.

Ogden originally received the Paidikion, but it was later retrieved from a used bookstore for half a crown. Excerpts were published in the International Journal of Greek Love in 1966. The original manuscript is now kept in the Human Sexuality Collection at Cornell University (Rare Books Division, 7745 Bd. Ms. 1).

Searight died in 1957.
