= Balaibalan =

Oldest known constructed language

- Bâleybelen
- باليبلن
- Created by: Fazlallah Astarabadi or Muhyî-i Gülşenî
- Date: 14th–16th century
- Users: None
- Purpose: Constructed language: Holy language; Balaibalan
- Writing system: Ottoman Turkish

Language codes
- ISO 639-3: zba
- Glottolog: bala1318
- IETF: art-x-balaibal

Balaibalan (Ottoman Turkish: باليبلن, romanized: Bâleybelen (Note: Also transcribed Bala-i-Balan, Bālaïbalan, Balibilen or similarly.)) is the oldest known constructed language. (Note: Lingua Ignota is older, but is an invented vocabulary embedded in Latin grammar, not a full language.)

== History ==
Balaibalan is the only well-documented early constructed language that is not of European origin, and it is independent of the fashion for language construction that occurred in the Renaissance. In contrast to the philosophical languages which prevailed then, and the languages designed for facilitating worldwide communication or for use in literature or film most prominent today, Balaibalan was probably designed as a holy or poetic language for religious reasons, like Lingua Ignota and perhaps Damin. Balaibalan may also have been a secret language which was only known by an inner circle.

Balaibalan may have been created by 14th century mystic Fazlallah Astarabadi, founder of Hurufism, or collectively by his followers in the 15th century, or perhaps by Muhyî-i Gülşenî, born in Edirne, a member of the Gülşenî sufi order in Cairo; in any case, the elaboration of the language was a collective endeavour.

The sole documentary attestation of Bâleybelen is a dictionary, copies of which are to be found in the Bibliothèque nationale de France in Paris and in the Princeton University Library.

== Linguistic properties ==
Balaibalan is an a priori language, written with the Ottoman alphabet (Arabic script). The grammar follows the lead of Persian, Turkish and Arabic; like Turkish, it is agglutinating. Much of the lexis appears wholly invented, but some words are borrowed from Arabic and the other source languages, and others can be traced back to words of the source languages in an indirect manner, via Sufi metaphor. For example:

- -gab-, the stem of the verb 'deliberate', is explained by the dictionary as being built out of the letters b, which indicates shared action between multiple people, and g, which indicates publicizing.
- ḏāt 'origin' appears to be borrowed from Arabic ḏāt, which means 'essence.'
- mim 'mouth' may reflect the Arabic name mim of the letter ⟨م⟩, whose shape is often compared in poetry to that of a mouth.

== Sources ==
- A. Bausani, Geheim- und Universalsprachen: Entwicklung und Typologie. Stuttgart, 1970: Kohlhammer Verlag.
- A. Bausani, Le lingue inventate : linguaggi artificiali, linguaggi segreti, linguaggi universali - Roma : Ubaldini, 1974.
- F. Bergmann, Résumé d'études d'odontologie générale et du linguistique générale, Paris, 1875
- Silvestre DeSacy, Kitab asl al-maqasid wa fasl al marasid, Le capital des objets recherchés et le chapitre des choses attendues, ou Dictionnaire de l'idiome Balaïbalan. Notices et extraits des manuscrits de la Bibliothèque Impériale [Paris], 9: 365–396.
- E. Drezen, Historio de la Mondolingvo, Moskvo 1991: Progreso.
- Charles Häberl, Bālaybalan, in Encyclopædia Iranica, to appear.
- M. Koç, Bâleybelen: İlk Yapma Dil. Istanbul, 2005.
- Bausani, Alessandro (1954). "About a curious "mystical" language BÂL-A I-BALAN". East and West. 4 (4 (JANUARY)). Istituto Italiano per l'Africa e l'Oriente: 234–238.
