= Alexarchus of Macedon =

4th and 3rd-century BC Greek writer

Alexarchus or Alexarch (Greek: Ἀλέξαρχος) was an Ancient Macedonian scholar and officer, son of Antipater and brother of Cassander. He lived around 350 to 290 BC. He is mentioned as the founder of a utopian town called Ouranopolis, in Chalcidice. Here he is said to have introduced a number of neologisms, which, though very expressive, appear to have been regarded as slang or pedantic.

== Glossary ==
- ἀπύτης aputes <caller> for keryx herald (Attic ἠπύω êpuô, Doric and Arcadian apuô, call to)
- ἀργυρὶς argyris <silver cup> for drachma
- βροτοκέρτης brotokertes <mortal-shaver> for koureus barber
- ἡμεροτροφὶς hemerotrophis <daily-food> for choinix dry measure
- ὀρθροβόας orthroboas <morning-shouter> for alektor, alektryon rooster
