= Pentacentrus =

Scientific classification
- Kingdom: Animalia
- Phylum: Arthropoda
- Class: Insecta
- Order: Orthoptera
- Suborder: Ensifera
- Family: Gryllidae
- Subfamily: Pentacentrinae
- Tribe: Pentacentrini
- Genus: Pentacentrus; Saussure, 1878

Genus of crickets

External image
- Images at iNaturalist

Pentacentrus is an Asian genus of crickets, typical of the tribe Pentacentrini and subfamily Pentacentrinae; these names are based on "Pentacentrites" coined by Henri Louis Frédéric de Saussure in 1878. Species in this genus have been recorded from: China, Sri Lanka, Indochina, Malesia and northern Australia (distribution is probably incomplete).

== Species ==
The Orthoptera Species File lists:

1. Pentacentrus acuminatus Chopard, 1930
2. Pentacentrus acutiparamerus Liu & Shi, 2014
3. Pentacentrus annulicornis Chopard, 1929
4. Pentacentrus biflexuous Liu & Shi, 2014
5. Pentacentrus birmanus Chopard, 1969
6. Pentacentrus biroi Chopard, 1927
7. Pentacentrus bituberus Liu & Shi, 2011
8. Pentacentrus brunneus Chopard, 1930
9. Pentacentrus cornutus Chopard, 1940
10. Pentacentrus cupulifer Chopard, 1930
11. Pentacentrus dulongjiangensis Li, Xu & Liu, 2019
12. Pentacentrus emarginatus Liu & Shi, 2014
13. Pentacentrus formosanus Karny, 1915
14. Pentacentrus kakirra Otte & Alexander, 1983
15. Pentacentrus laminifer Chopard, 1940
16. Pentacentrus medogensis Zong, Qiu & Liu, 2017
17. Pentacentrus microtympanalis Gorochov, 1986
18. Pentacentrus minutus Chopard, 1927
19. Pentacentrus mjobergi Chopard, 1930
20. Pentacentrus multicapillus Liu & Shi, 2011
21. Pentacentrus nigrescens Chopard, 1951
22. Pentacentrus papuanus Chopard, 1951
23. Pentacentrus parvulus Liu & Shi, 2014
24. Pentacentrus philippinensis Chopard, 1925
25. Pentacentrus pulchellus Saussure, 1878 - type species
26. Pentacentrus punctulatus Chopard, 1925
27. Pentacentrus quadridentatus Chopard, 1940
28. Pentacentrus quadrilineatus Chopard, 1940
29. Pentacentrus sexspinosus Chopard, 1940
30. Pentacentrus soror Chopard, 1951
31. Pentacentrus sororius Zong, Qiu & Liu, 2017
32. Pentacentrus transversus Liu & Shi, 2015
33. Pentacentrus tridentatus Chopard, 1969
34. Pentacentrus unicolor Chopard, 1925
35. Pentacentrus unifenestratus Caudell, 1927
36. Pentacentrus velutinus Chopard, 1937
37. Pentacentrus vicinus Chopard, 1930
