= Acanthoplistus =

Scientific classification
- Domain: Eukaryota
- Kingdom: Animalia
- Phylum: Arthropoda
- Class: Insecta
- Order: Orthoptera
- Suborder: Ensifera
- Family: Gryllidae
- Subfamily: Gryllinae
- Tribe: Gryllini
- Genus: Acanthoplistus; Saussure, 1877

Species
- See text

Genus of crickets

Acanthoplistus is a genus of crickets in the tribe Gryllini; species are recorded from west Africa, with a discontinuous presence in India and Indo-China.

== Taxonomy ==
Genus contains the following species:

- Acanthoplistus acutus Saussure, 1877
- Acanthoplistus africanus Gorochov, 1988
- Acanthoplistus birmanus Saussure, 1877
- Acanthoplistus carinatus Saussure, 1877
- Acanthoplistus femoratus Chopard, 1931
- Acanthoplistus maliensis Gorochov, 1988
- Acanthoplistus murzuni Gorochov, 1996
- Acanthoplistus nigritibia Zheng & Woo, 1992
- Acanthoplistus testaceus Zheng & Woo, 1992
