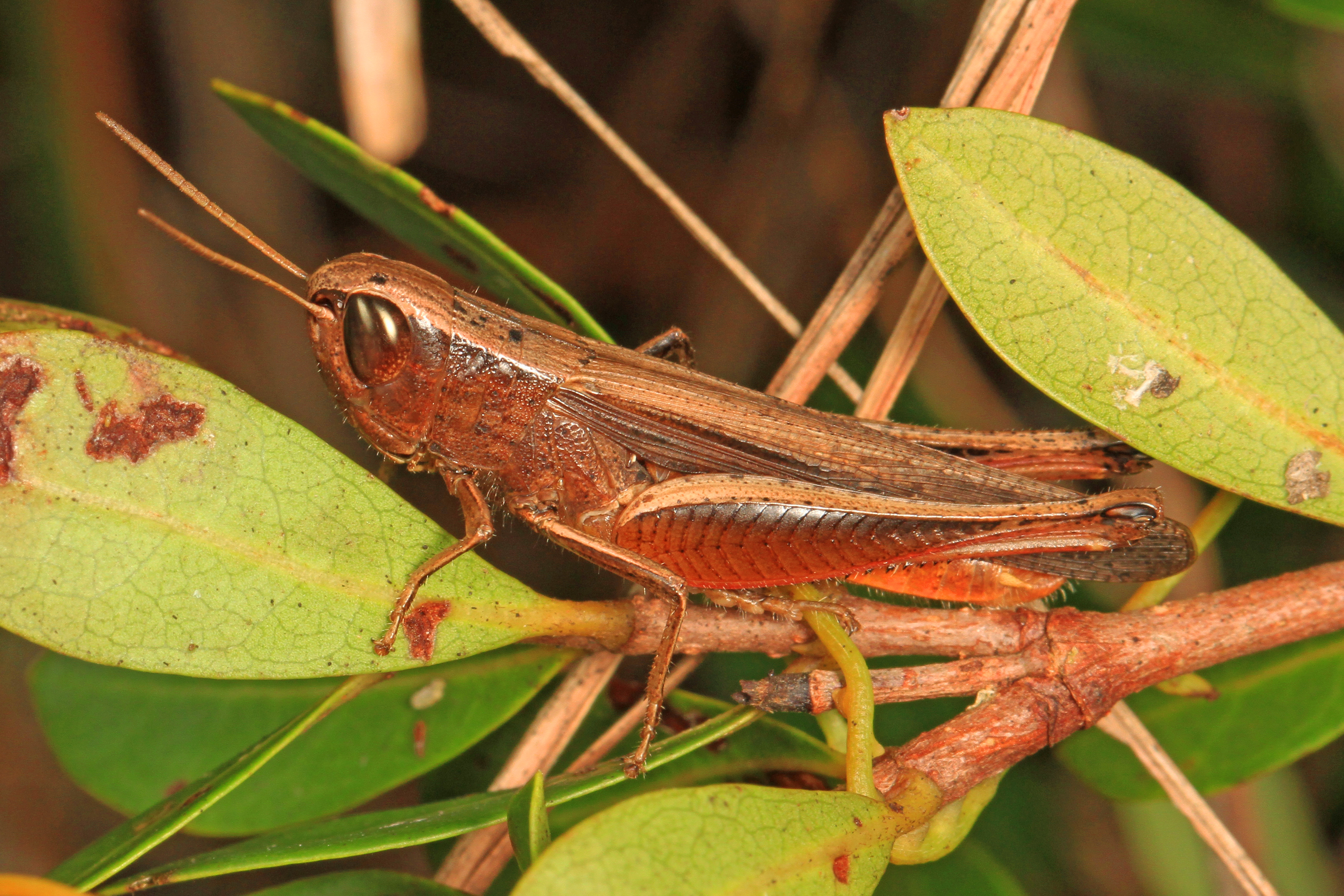

Scientific classification
- Kingdom: Animalia
- Phylum: Arthropoda
- Class: Insecta
- Order: Orthoptera
- Suborder: Caelifera
- Family: Acrididae
- Subfamily: Gomphocerinae
- Genus: Amblytropidia
- Species: A. mysteca

Binomial name
- Amblytropidia mysteca (Saussure, 1861)

= Amblytropidia mysteca =

Species of grasshopper

Amblytropidia mysteca, the brown winter grasshopper, is a species of slant-faced grasshopper in the family Acrididae. It is found in Central America and North America.

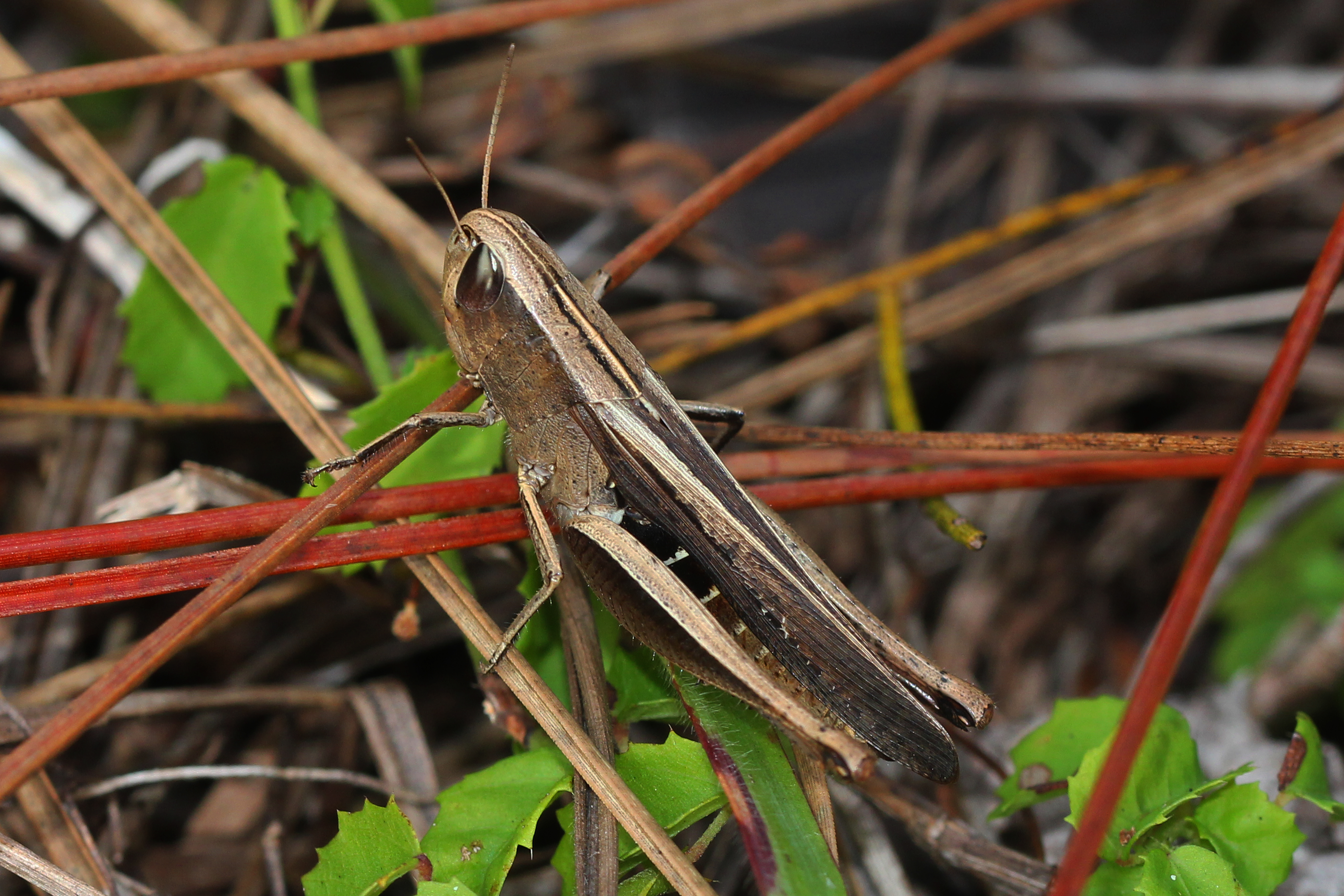
Brown winter grasshopper, Amblytropidia mysteca

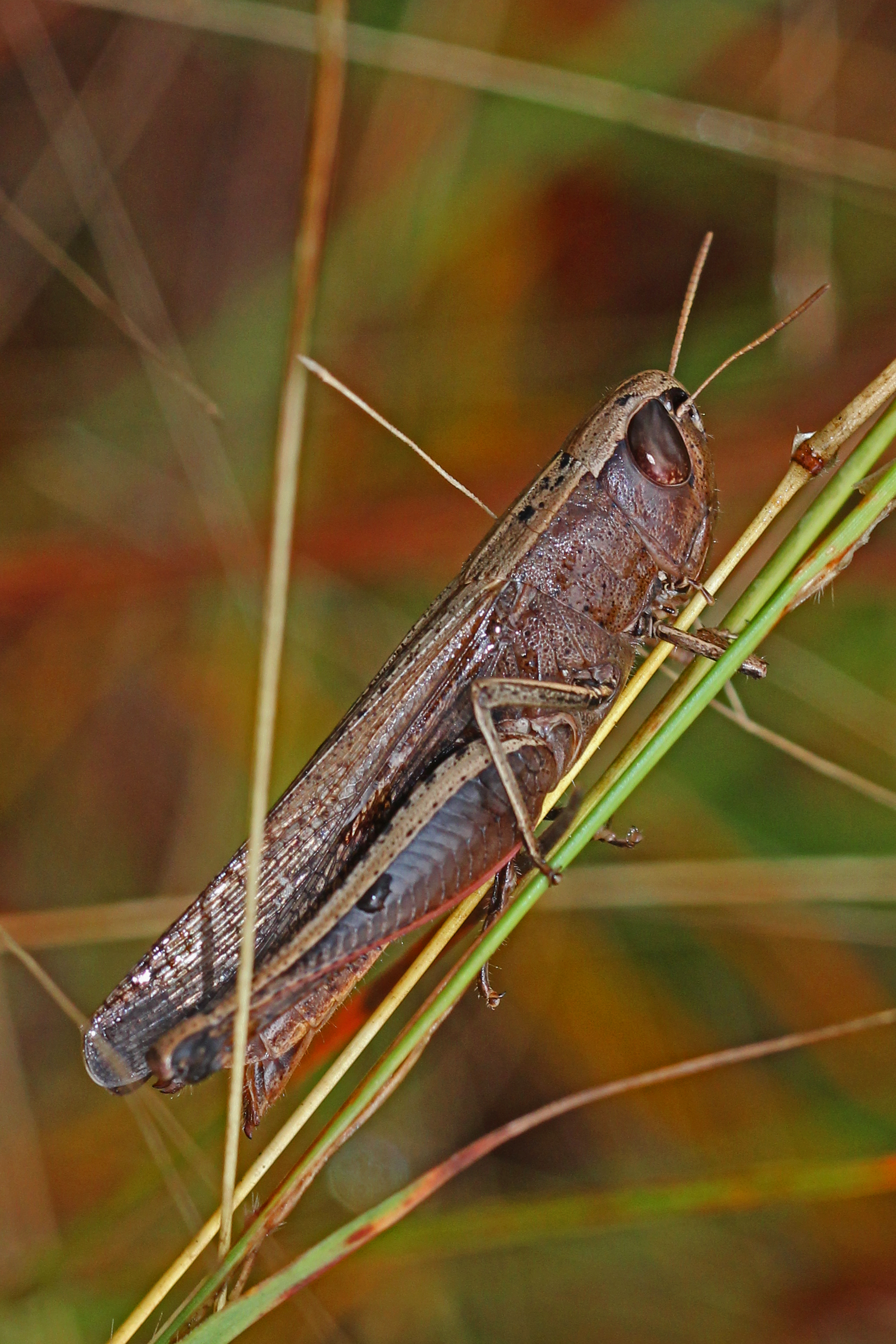
Brown winter grasshopper, Amblytropidia mysteca
