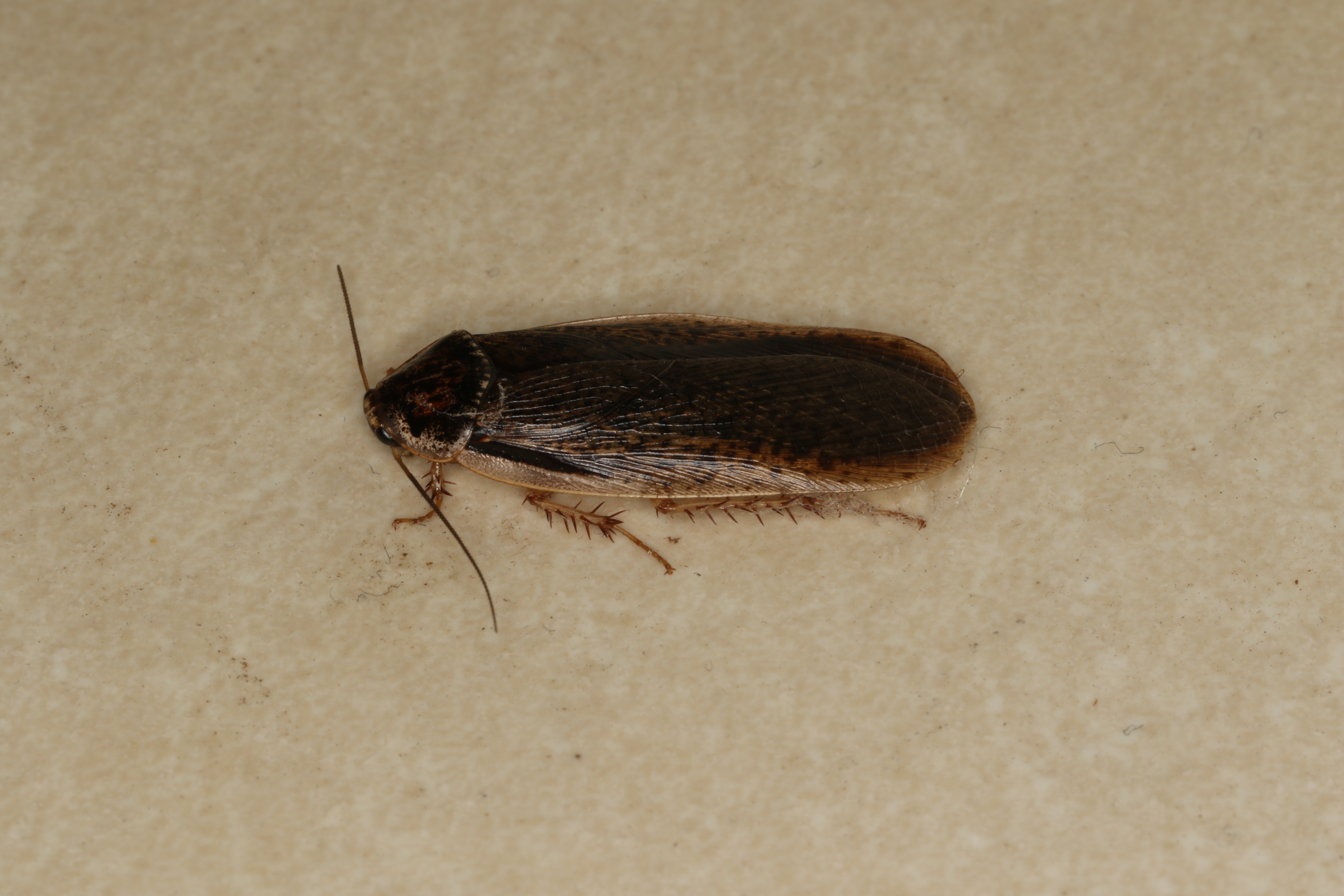
- Calolampra sp.

Scientific classification
- Kingdom: Animalia
- Phylum: Arthropoda
- Clade: Pancrustacea
- Class: Insecta
- Order: Blattodea
- Family: Blaberidae
- Subfamily: Epilamprinae
- Genus: Calolampra; Saussure, 1893

Species
- See text

= Calolampra =

Genus of cockroaches

Calolampra is a genus of Australian cockroaches in the family Blaberidae.

== Species ==
The genus includes the following species:

- Calolampra aspera
- Calolampra atra
- Calolampra candidula
- Calolampra characterosa
- Calolampra confusa
- Calolampra darlingtoni
- Calolampra depolita
- Calolampra elegans
- Calolampra fenestrata
- Calolampra fraserensis
- Calolampra ignota
- Calolampra indonesica
- Calolampra insularis
- Calolampra irrorata
- Calolampra malaisei
- Calolampra marginalis
- Calolampra mjoebergi
- Calolampra nitida
- Calolampra obscura
- Calolampra paula
- Calolampra pernotabilis
- Calolampra propinqua
- Calolampra punctosa
- Calolampra queenslandica
- Calolampra signatura
- Calolampra solida
- Calolampra subgracilis
- Calolampra submarginalis
- Calolampra tepperi
- Calolampra truncata
