= René de Saussure =

Swiss Esperantist and mathematician (1868–1943)

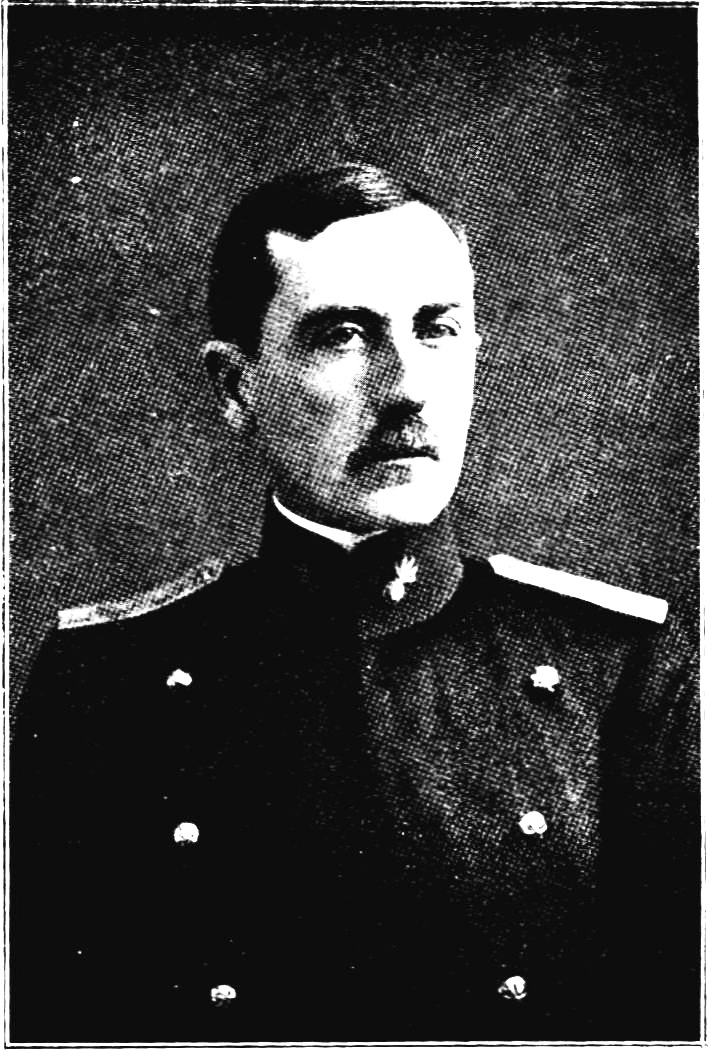
- Portrait of de Saussure, before 1909
- Born: 17 March 1868; Geneva, Switzerland
- Died: 2 December 1943 (aged 75); Bern, Switzerland
- Occupations: Esperantist, professional mathematician
- Known for: Inventor of Esperanto II
- Relatives: Ferdinand de Saussure (brother)

René de Saussure (17 March 1868 – 2 December 1943) was a Swiss Esperantist and professional mathematician who composed important works about the linguistics of Esperanto and interlinguistics.

== Biography ==
He was born in Geneva, Switzerland. René's father was the scientist Henri Louis Frédéric de Saussure. His brothers were linguist Ferdinand de Saussure and Sinologist Léopold de Saussure.

He defended a doctoral thesis on a subject in geometry at the Johns Hopkins University in 1895 and until 1899 he was professor at the Catholic University of America in Washington, D.C., and later in Geneva and Bern.

His main work is an analysis of the logic of word construction in Esperanto, Fundamentaj reguloj de la vortteorio en Esperanto ("Fundamental rules of word theory in Esperanto"), defending the language against several Idist critiques. He developed the concept of neceso kaj sufiĉo ("necessity and sufficience") by which he opposed the criticism of Louis Couturat that Esperanto lacks recursion.

Spesmilo symbol

In 1907, de Saussure proposed the international currency spesmilo (₷). It was used by the Ĉekbanko esperantista and other British and Swiss banks until the First World War.

Beginning in 1919, de Saussure proposed a series of Esperanto reforms, and in 1925, he renounced Esperanto in favor of his artificial language Esperanto II. He later became a consultant for the International Auxiliary Language Association, the linguistic research body that standardized and presented Interlingua. He died on 2 December 1943 in Bern, Switzerland.

== Legacy ==
A new silver Esperanto coin for 100 Steloj was struck in 2018 for the 150th birthday of René de Saussure.

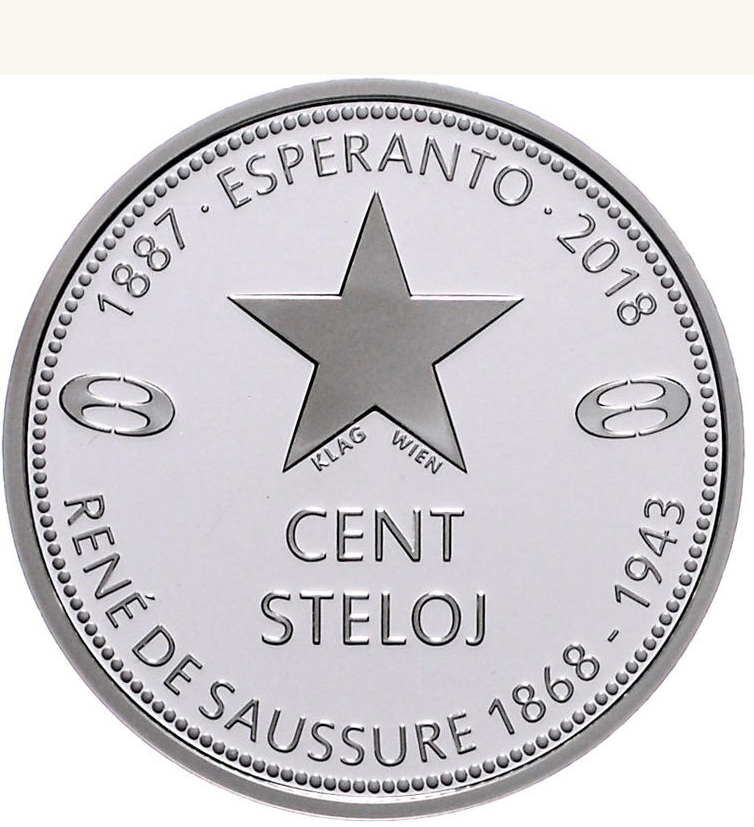
Esperanto 100 Steloj 2018 - Avers.

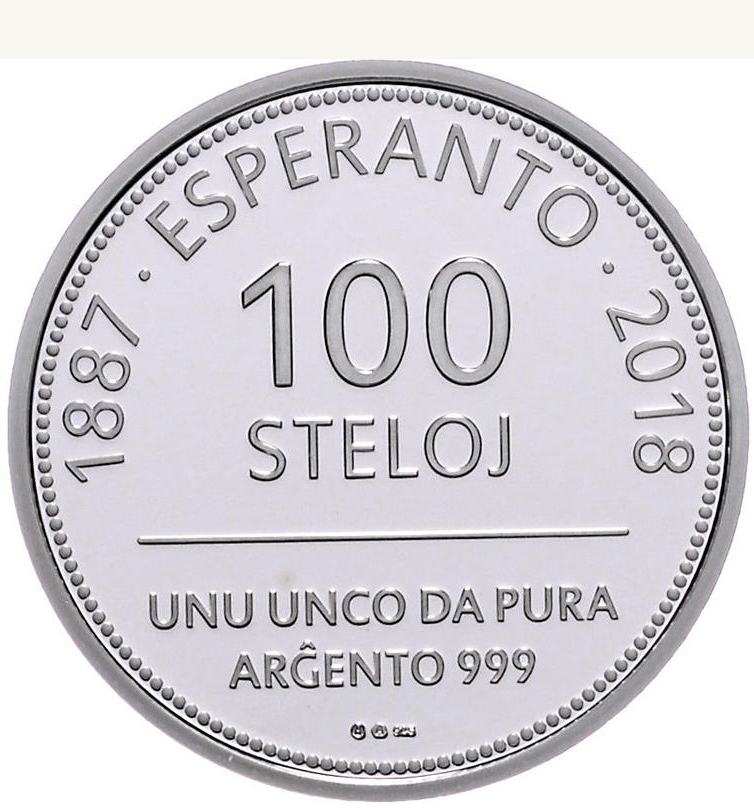
Esperanto 100 Steloj 2018 - Revers.
