= Trigonidomimus belfragei =

Scientific classification
- Domain: Eukaryota
- Kingdom: Animalia
- Phylum: Arthropoda
- Class: Insecta
- Order: Orthoptera
- Suborder: Ensifera
- Family: Gryllidae
- Subfamily: Pentacentrinae
- Genus: Trigonidomimus
- Species: T. belfragei

Binomial name
- Trigonidomimus belfragei Caudell, 1912

Species of cricket

Trigonidomimus belfragei, or Belfrage's cricket, is a species of anomalous cricket in the family Gryllidae. It is found in North America.
