= Acanthoplistus acutus =

Scientific classification
- Domain: Eukaryota
- Kingdom: Animalia
- Phylum: Arthropoda
- Class: Insecta
- Order: Orthoptera
- Suborder: Ensifera
- Family: Gryllidae
- Genus: Acanthoplistus
- Species: A. acutus

Binomial name
- Acanthoplistus acutus Saussure, 1877

Species of cricket

Acantoplistus acutus is an insect species from the family Gryllidae (crickets). The species name for this type of cricket was validly published for the first time in 1877 by Henri Louis Frédéric de Saussure.
