= Trigonidomimus =

Scientific classification
- Domain: Eukaryota
- Kingdom: Animalia
- Phylum: Arthropoda
- Class: Insecta
- Order: Orthoptera
- Suborder: Ensifera
- Family: Gryllidae
- Subfamily: Pentacentrinae
- Genus: Trigonidomimus; Caudell, 1912

Genus of crickets

Trigonidomimus is a genus of anomalous crickets in the family Gryllidae. There are about five described species in Trigonidomimus recorded from the Americas.

== Species ==
These five species belong to the genus Trigonidomimus:

- Trigonidomimus annuliger (Hebard, 1928)
- Trigonidomimus belfragei Caudell, 1912 (Belfrage's cricket)
- Trigonidomimus comptus (Walker, 1869)
- Trigonidomimus ruficeps Chopard, 1956
- Trigonidomimus zernyi (Chopard, 1931)
