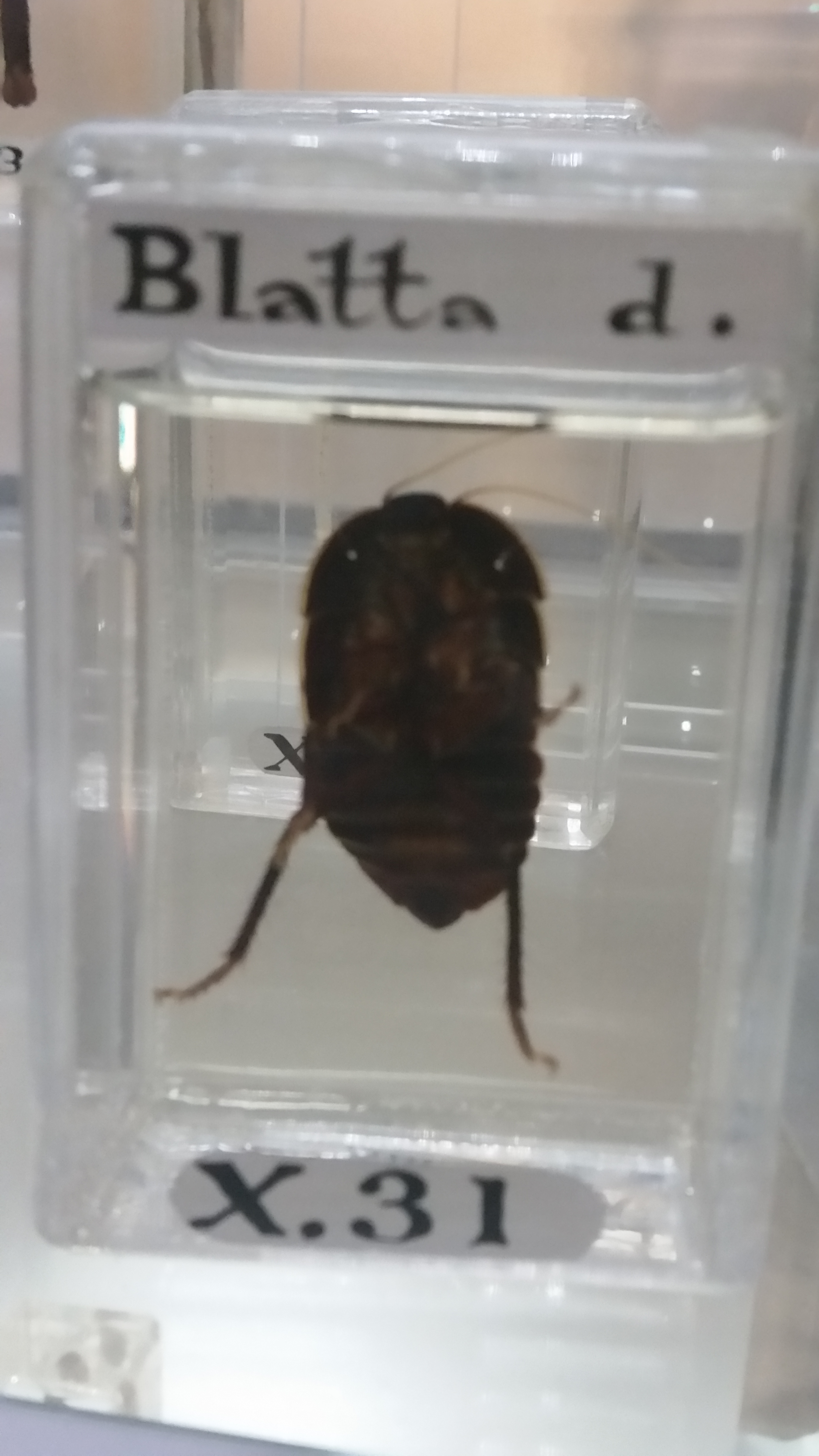

Scientific classification
- Kingdom: Animalia
- Phylum: Arthropoda
- Clade: Pancrustacea
- Class: Insecta
- Order: Blattodea
- Family: Blaberidae
- Genus: Calolampra
- Species: C. elegans

Binomial name
- Calolampra elegans Roth & Princis, 1973

= Calolampra elegans =

Species of cockroach

Calolampra elegans is a species of cockroach in the family Blaberidae. It is found in Queensland, Australia.
