= Stelo =

Monetary unit of Esperantists (1945–1993)

The stelo ("star"; plural: steloj) was from 1945 to 1993 a monetary unit of Esperantists, one of whose aims was to achieve a single world currency. Attempts at an earlier currency, the speso, were cut short by the First World War. For a time the Universal League (Esperanto: Universala Ligo), part of the Esperanto movement, issued coupons and coins denominated in steloj, making attempts to link the Stelo to existing currencies on the basis of relative purchasing power in different countries.

A currency by the same name is used in some Esperanto youth meetings from 2012 to the present day. It has plastic coins in several colors.

== The speso ==
For Esperantists concerned with international relationships, the need for a currency with a fixed purchasing power was very important. To commemorate the 25th anniversary of Esperanto in 1912, the Swiss firm Holy Frères made coins for the Universal Esperanto Association — the Speso (plural: Spesoj) — in the denominations spesdeko (10 spesoj), spescento (100 spesoj), spesmilo (1,000 spesoj) and spesdekmilo (10,000 spesoj). The First World War, however, put an end to this initiative.

== Founding of the Universal League ==
On 14 April 1942, the 25th anniversary of the death of L. L. Zamenhof, a group of faithful Esperantists had gathered in secret in a private residence in The Hague to remember him. The Netherlands were then under Nazi occupation and the group had already experienced the tyranny of the police state. Esperantists had been among the groups especially persecuted and even exterminated by the Nazis, and they now wanted jointly to undertake a concrete task to help save mankind from "world catastrophe."

After discussion, the Esperantists agreed to form the Universal League as an organization whose principal purpose would be to implement Zamenhof's original program: to unite humanity in peace through a common language. Employing the motto "One World, One Language, One Currency," the Netherlands-based group promoted the use of the Stelo as a universal currency unit.

With the founding of the Universal League, an express wish of the now-deceased Zamenhof and of Esperantists from many different lands both before and during the Second World War was coming to fruition. The original participants secretly invited other well-known Esperantists to take part in the discussions. A preparatory committee was constituted to develop and fix the ideas further. On 1 April 1945 the committee revealed their basic concept to the world. One of their stated purposes was: "to strive for the creation of a world currency, based on an international monetary unit, the Stelo."

On 16 March 1946 its first international assembly was held in The Hague. The 1294 members at the meeting approved a constitution, one of the stated goals of which was the issuing of Stelo currency with a stable, internationally agreed value. The members elected a committee to work out further details for the use of the Stelo. The contribution for a lifelong membership was at first set as the "cornerstone" value of one Stelo. Soon, however, it was announced that the value of a Stelo would equal the price of a standard loaf of bread in the Netherlands, which at that time cost 0.25 Dutch guilders.

The 1946 assembly re-emphasized the motto "One World, One Language, One Currency." The League had commercial relations with banks in six countries (Belgium, Denmark, Germany, Italy, Sweden and Switzerland), as well as with three Dutch banks. For all these bank accounts the Universal League maintained parallel systematic accounting in the local currency and in Steloj, and appointed agents in 14 other countries. These representatives submitted their financial operations reports on the basis of the Stelo.

== Monetary stability ==
The archives of the Universal League show that the intention was to mint a coin with a fixed value. The League saw this stability as the only way to lift the world from the pressures of economic differentials that tended to result in conflicts among peoples. Exchange rates for the Stelo outside the Netherlands were based on 1946 exchange rates for other currencies quoted by the largest Dutch commercial bank.

=== Coupons ===
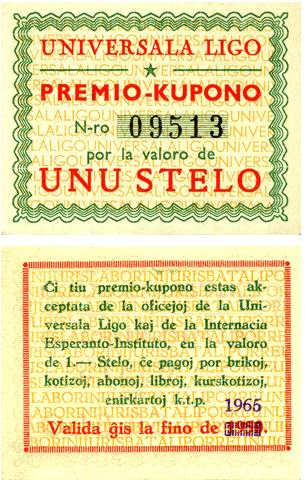
Coupons issued by the Universal League for 1 Stelo.

At first the Esperantists had to forgo further steps, such as the establishment of their own bank with a worldwide cheque endorsing and payment system and the issuing of coins and banknotes. At that time the various nations had strict rules governing international financial operations that were designed to shield them from outside financial attack.

Even in the early period (1945) the Universal League nevertheless brought out the 1-Stelo Premio-Kupono, which remained valid till 1950. Every new coupon issue brought on the market was intended to be valid for five years. The coupons were used to pay for subscriptions, advertisements, activity participation costs, etc. League members also received the coupons as rewards for introducing new members or as competition prizes. According to a report in La Praktiko the use of Premio-Kupono flourished, and it became habitual for Esperantists to pay with them, for example during Esperanto world conferences.

Later development of the Stelo stagnated. The Universal League founders wanted to show their good will by maintaining a constant value for the Stelo, but their efforts were doomed to failure. The Dutch price of bread gradually increased, but nobody thought to adjust the relationship between the Stelo and the guilder. The ratio remained four Steloj to the guilder, and bank currency conversion tables were used to fix the value of the Stelo in other countries. Moreover, even the Universal League gave up the idea of recording bookkeeping transactions in Stelo monetary units, so nobody gained experience with a coin of constant value. It is no wonder that the Stelo lost its reputation and that its use even by Esperantists became rare.

=== Minting of coinage ===
During the 1950s membership in the Universal League grew to 15,000 Esperantists. In 1959, they realized the longstanding dream of minting Esperanto coinage in denominations of one Stelo (bronze), five Steloj (yellow copper) and ten Steloj (cupronickel). Rich from worldwide commodity sales receipts, the Universal League had placed a large order for with the Royal Dutch Mint (Rijksmunt) in Utrecht to strike the coinage. This investment was swiftly recouped, with the result that in 1965 the League was able to issue a fourth denomination, a silver 25 steloj coin, which also sold very well. Cupronickel and gold variants of the 25 steloj denomination were also minted.

But the other dream of the Stelo retaining a constant value was almost forgotten except among the very old Universal League members. The League fell quiet and scarcely did anything, though still publishing the illustrated magazine La Praktiko. The new subtitle was A journal for citizens of the world; previously it had been A journal for instruction and recreation. Publication of the periodical stopped only in 1970, when Andreo Cseh, who had been editor since 1946, had to retire due to weak health. Dr. Cseh remained in a care home until his death in 1979.

List of coins:

Image	Value	Diameter	Mass	Composition	Edge	Obverse	Reverse	Mintage
	1 stelo	20 mm	3 g	Bronze	Plain	Heraldry of radiant star with text "UNU MONDO · UNU LINGVO · UNU MONO" ("One world, one language, one currency").	Value over star, "UNIVERSALA LIGO", year	10,000
	5 steloj	23 mm	5 g	Aluminium bronze	Milled	Globe with text "LA MONDO ESTAS UNU LANDO ★ LA HOMARO UNU POPOLO" ("The world is one country, humanity one people").	Value over star, "UNIVERSALA LIGO", year	10,000
	10 steloj	28 mm	9 g	Cupronickel	Plain	Effigy of Ludwik Lejzer Zamenhof with text "D-RO L.L. ZAMENHOF KREINTO DE ESPERANTO" ("Dr. Zamenhof, creator of Esperanto") and "1859–1917"	Value over star, "UNIVERSALA LIGO", year	10,000
	25 steloj (cupronickel)	37.8 mm	19 g	Cupronickel	Plain	Effigy of Ludwik Lejzer Zamenhof with text "D-RO L.L. ZAMENHOF KREINTO DE ESPERANTO" ("Dr. Zamenhof, creator of Esperanto") and "1859–1917"	Value over star, "UNIVERSALA LIGO", year	1,000
	25 steloj (silver)	37.8 mm	25 g	90% Ag	Plain	Effigy of Ludwik Lejzer Zamenhof with text "D-RO L.L. ZAMENHOF KREINTO DE ESPERANTO" ("Dr. Zamenhof, creator of Esperanto") and "1859–1917"	Value over star, "UNIVERSALA LIGO", year	5,000
	25 steloj (gold)	37.8 mm	50 g	98.3% Au	Plain, each coin with an individual number engraved	Effigy of Ludwik Lejzer Zamenhof with text "D-RO L.L. ZAMENHOF KREINTO DE ESPERANTO" ("Dr. Zamenhof, creator of Esperanto") and "1859–1917"	Value over star, "UNIVERSALA LIGO", year	10

== Lawrence Mee's role ==
Lawrence Mee was to breathe new life into the Universal League. In 1973 Mee and his wife became co-workers at the head office of the World Esperanto Organization. The following year the Universal League selected a few faithful members to lead a renewal of the League in striving for peace through cooperation with the World Association for World Federation (now known as the World Federalist Movement/Institute for Global Policy) and the World Esperanto Association.

For two years they promoted development of the Stelo as an international currency. After long discussion they concluded that the Stelo should be revalued from a fourth of a guilder to a half-guilder. Further discussions led the Universal League to fix the value of the Stelo. Mee was later to write a significant and comprehensive essay on the development of the Stelo, "De stabiele munteenheid van de esperantisten: de stelo" ("The stable monetary unit of the Esperantists: the Stelo'"), which first appeared in the 2000 Yearbook of Europees Genootschap voor Munt- en Penningkunde, a federation of Dutch-language numismatic associations.

=== Fixed value ===
Setting a fixed value for the Stelo meant that, as of a certain date, its purchasing power would thereafter remain the same and would not be subject to inflation. On the chosen date, 1 January 1977, the purchasing power of one Stelo was defined as equal to a half guilder; i.e., one guilder was set equal to two Steloj.

Dr. Josef Hartl of Vienna had devised a detailed plan for fixing the value of the Stelo. Around 1977 Dr. Hartl had circulated a pamphlet on the Stelo that appears to have influenced Lawrence Mee. Hartl's article suggested the circulation of a currency with a constant value as an answer to inflationary devaluation. His basic idea was that regardless of its level of development each country could calculate in its national currency an average family's monthly expenditure. One could then arbitrarily assign the value of 1,000 monetary units to this average monthly expenditure. Thus by definition, the loss to a family in any country of, say, 10 units would be absolutely equal to 10 "international monetary units."

By careful calculation, therefore, the conversion rate between the international monetary unit and the national currency could be adjusted as necessary according to the inflation rate in any particular country. By basing transactions among different countries on the international monetary unit, the national currencies would be beyond the attacks of speculators; indeed, speculation in currency values would become useless.

As often occurs, several unconnected events happened to coincide:

- In 1976 the Internacia Scienca Asocio Esperantista (ISAE: International Esperanto Sciences Association) urged the Universal League to revalue the Stelo;
- New members took a leading role in the League;
- In the League a forgotten supply of Stelo coins was rediscovered;
- At the same time the publication of a new magazine began;
- A Dutch monetary reformer published an article concerning the unsuitability of currency systems in the industrialized lands; and
- Dr. Hartl launched his pamphlet.

=== A new treasurer for the League ===
Lawrence Mee enthusiastically accepted the position of League treasurer in 1977. Remaining as board members were Christiaan M.N.T. Op 't Roodt and Willem P. Roelofs, who were eager to quickly establish a procedure to keep the Stelo's value constant and to publish the result within the framework of the Esperanto movement. Under the editorship of Op 't Roodt, the Universal League's new periodical Bulteno was guided by the idea that the value of the Stelo would remain constant, unaffected by inflation.

With bank accounts in seven countries including the Netherlands, the Universal League needed to stipulate the value of the Stelo in these countries. For want of scientific data on the effective purchasing power of the various national currencies it was, however, impossible to determine reliable conversion rates between the Stelo and each national currency. While the conversion rate with the guilder was solidly established, agreement on the other rates would not be easy.

Dr. Roelofs especially wanted to give the Stelo a character totally different from Dr. Hartl's idea of international monetary units. He also advocated using the Stelo as propaganda for money reform. Dr. Roelofs believed that the Stelo should serve as the basis for international financial transactions, but only between countries that refused to deal with commercial banks. How the system would function was never detailed on paper, writes Lawrence Mee, "presumably because the ideas of money reformers were already well known." Although he admitted that the original basis of the purchasing-power provision was somewhat arbitrary, Mee wanted the Stelo to serve in the role originally envisioned by the Universal League.

Even after months of discussions, it was not possible to fashion a compromise between the two views, but a majority of the League's governing board supported Roelofs's views. Mee could not accept the decision and resigned from the League. From time to time Roelofs supplied Bulteno with tables of the Stelo's current value but never disclosed his principles or calculation method. Mee himself could not work out the underlying value ratios used, although he assumed that they had been archived.

== The unofficial Stelo ==
For Lawrence Mee the ideas of Dr. Hartl were not dead. He and his wife had long used the Stelo in the bookkeeping for their business Mondkomercista Eldonejo Esperantista (an Esperanto-language trade publisher). After his departure from the Universal League he tried to apply Dr. Roelofs's currency values, but quickly concluded that the data on the purchasing power of the Stelo were erroneous. From the mid-1980s he began to collect statistical data on inflation in various countries, gaining the unexpected support of an economics instructor at Erasmus University in Rotterdam. The instructor had a great interest in Mee's work. An honorary member of the library at Erasmus University, Mee occupied much of his free time in researching statistical data on the 25 countries of the Organisation for Economic Co-operation and Development.

Mee worked out the unofficial value of the Stelo in those 25 countries, using as his point of departure 1 January 1977, the day on which the Stelo's fixed purchasing power was defined. He discovered that the Universal League formula was certainly wrong for the Netherlands; he presumed that it was wrong for other countries also, although he did not yet have proof of this.

The progress of Mee's research accelerated in 1981 as he began distributing tables of nine countries' currency relationships, with which he could make rapid and trustworthy calculations. It shortly became apparent, however, that the Italian data were not sufficiently dependable for him to make reliable inferences about that country's currency values.

The basic calculating system was so adapted that could he but obtain regular and reliable data, he could fix the currency relationships among many more countries. Mee believed, however, that even his incomplete data had great utility. The currency relationships permitted him to determine the purchasing power of the Stelo and to express it in the national currency of a certain country. To be able to put the Stelo into service everywhere would require the joint work of a multinational network of collaborators. Yet Lawrence Mee continued.

Matters went still more rapidly after he purchased a computer, which by current norms would be considered primitive. It was already possible in September 1992 to rapidly calculate currency value predictions for different countries. Since then a booklet with the title Informkajero pri la Stelo (Notes about the Stelo) has been published and distributed through enthusiastic collaborators, especially by the Esperantocentrum in Aarhus, Denmark.

At the beginning of his study into the Stelo's purchasing power, Dr. Mee and his associates had already noted that the purchasing power in Great Britain had been determined arbitrarily: on 1 January 1977, for example, according to the large banks' currency agreements one pound was equal to 4.1875 guilder. Because one guilder was then defined as equal to 2 Steloj it followed that one pound would be equal to 8.375 Steloj. This exchange rate would remain until a more reliable method could be devised to directly compare the purchasing power in the two countries with each other. Dr. Mee also applied the same system to other countries.

Lawrence Mee had already reported an arbitrary decision on fixing the basic purchasing power of the Stelo in other countries outside the Netherlands. To fix its accounting basis he applied other arbitrary decisions, each time with the goal of presenting acceptable currency rates. Those decisions formed the system he employed to regularly calculate and publish currency conversion rates.

== Utility of the Stelo ==
Since the Stelo was the currency of Esperantists, a good example of its utility was the publication of a monthly magazine and the payment of rents and salaries. The publisher of a monthly magazine receives subscription money, requires the services of a printer, and must pay for stationery and postage, etc. Under the influence of inflation costs will tend to increase but not all at the same time and not all in proportion to the inflation rate. Eventually the publisher must contemplate an increase to the annual subscription rate. The new annual rate usually has to be announced in September before the next calendar year.

Mee and his associates could show that linking the subscription rate to a stable currency unit facilitated this task, although commercial bank rates still required separate consideration. If a particular publisher in 1977 were satisfied with the exchange-value of 60 Steloj for one year, Mee's studies concerning the Stelo predicted that the exchange value of 60 Steloj would continue to be sufficient in future years. That publisher, therefore, would need only the currency tables for September to have an idea of the required subscription price level in national currencies for the next year.

A second example from the practice of the Esperantists is the rental of a hall to another society. As the Esperanto Association would want to maintain the same purchasing power for its rental revenue (since the Association's expenses would be likely to increase through inflation over time) it could conclude an agreement with the tenant, expressed in Steloj but payable in the national currency according to the then-current monthly conversion rate.

A third example is the determination of the salary for work performed. Whether we reckon using the Stelo system or not, wages are a matter of daily concern. All industrialized countries must contend with inflation, which continuously gnaws away at the family budget, and the only remedy is the continuing increase of salaries. Especially in the industrialized world, wage negotiations can lead to sometimes bitter confrontation between employers and labour unions. In developing countries lacking a strong tradition of labour relations law, these confrontations can result in human rights abuses or even in police or military intervention. After a strike or lockout has concluded it may take a long time to regain an atmosphere of mutual confidence and trust. Esperantist economists believe that the application of the Stelo to labour-management negotiations could prevent these problems.

== Dissolution of the Universal League ==
The Universal League remained in existence, but in the Esperanto world its significance declined. After they had placed his obituary in the periodical Esperanto, many of his colleagues died as well. Dr. Roelofs had taken over the editing of the Bulteno when Dr. Op 't Roodt could no longer undertake it. The irregular appearance of new issues of the Bulteno made apparent the reduction in active League membership.

In 1993 the governing board of the Universal League ceased publishing the Bulteno and decided to wind up the affairs of the League itself. The remaining capital was divided among several foundations, with most of the funds going to the World Esperanto Association. Among the grants was found a stock of Stelo coins to be sold through the UEA as collector's items. The death of Dr. Op 't Roodt in 1996 and of Dr. Roelofs in 1998 marked the end of a major Esperantist initiative.

== Esperanto coin 100 Steloj 2018 silver ==
Anniversary of René de Saussure (150th birthday), 1868–1943. 31,1 g silver 999/1000.

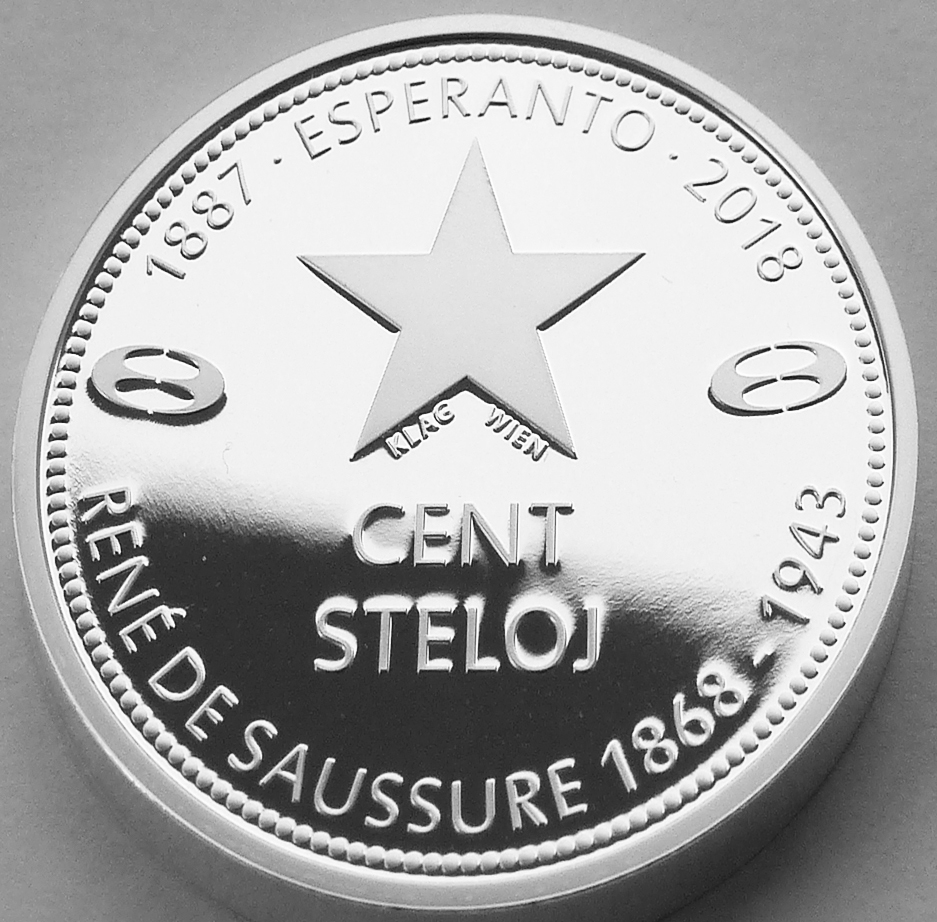

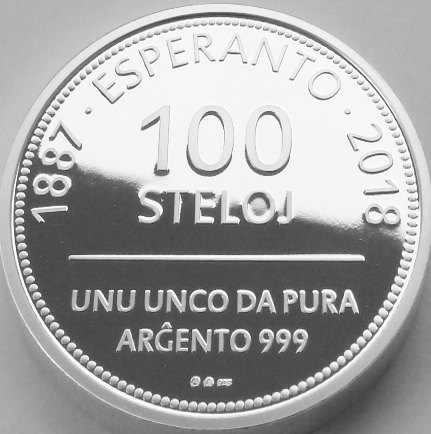

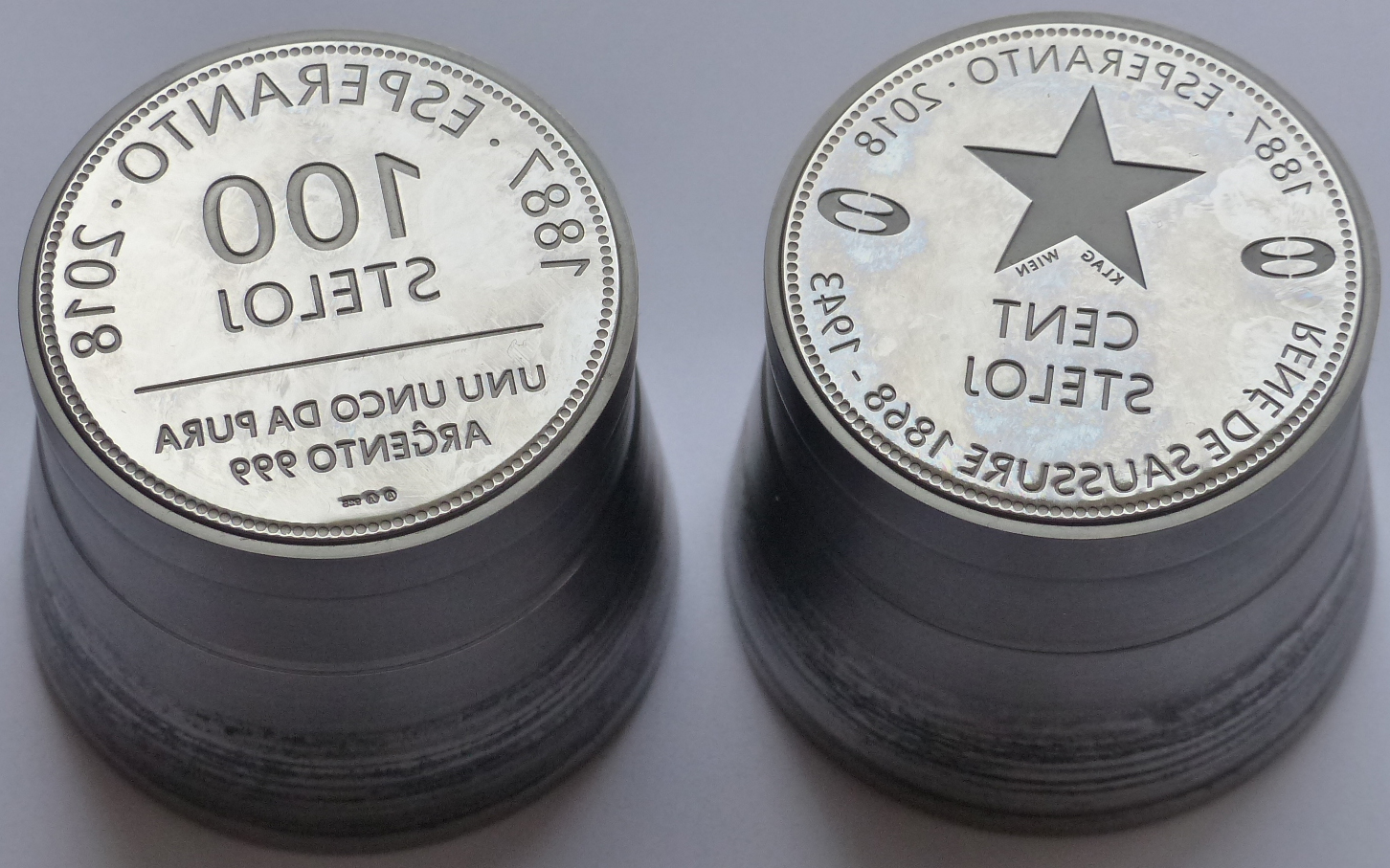

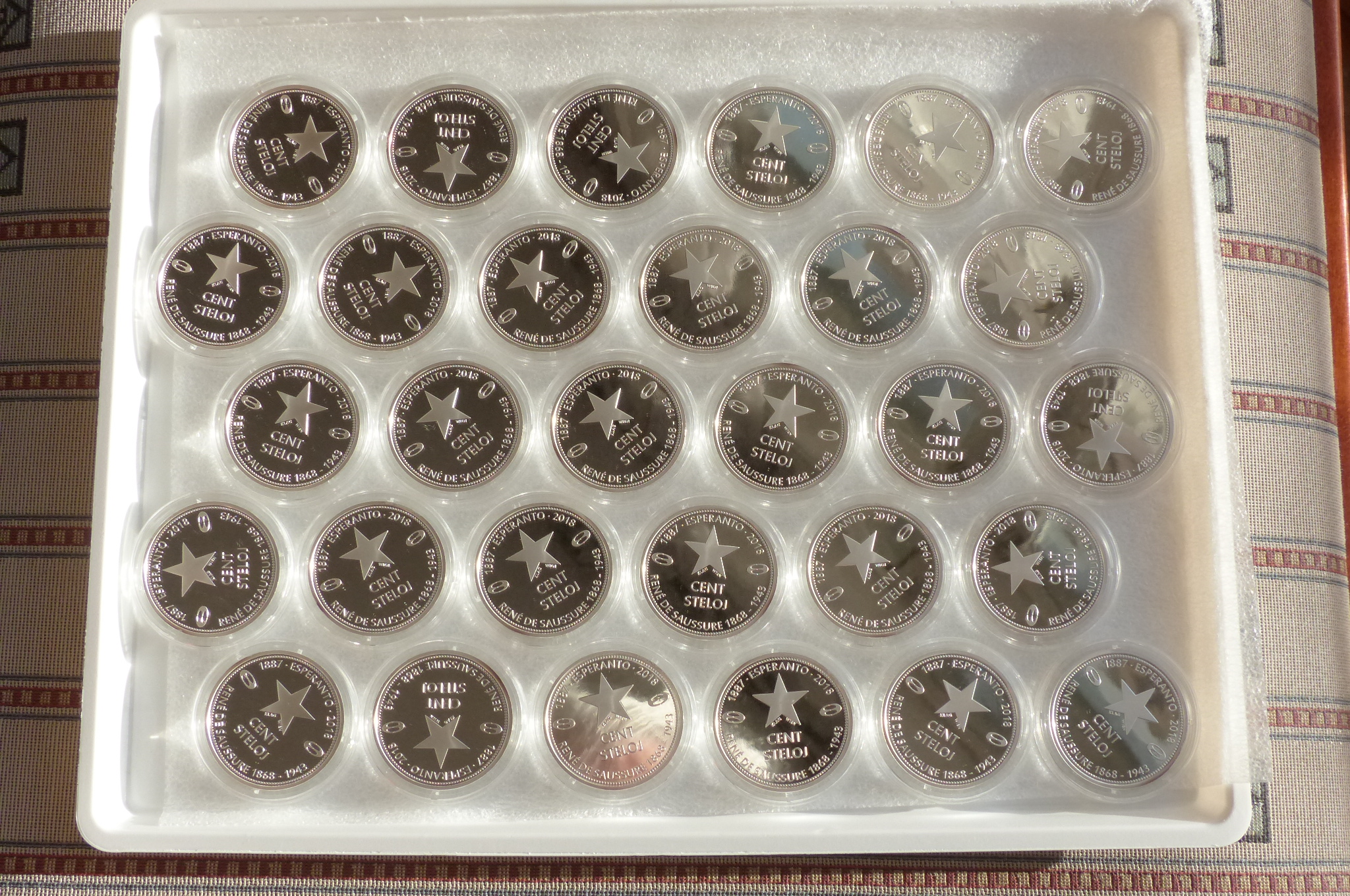

== Esperanto coin 50 Steloj 2020 silver ==
30 g silver 925/1000.

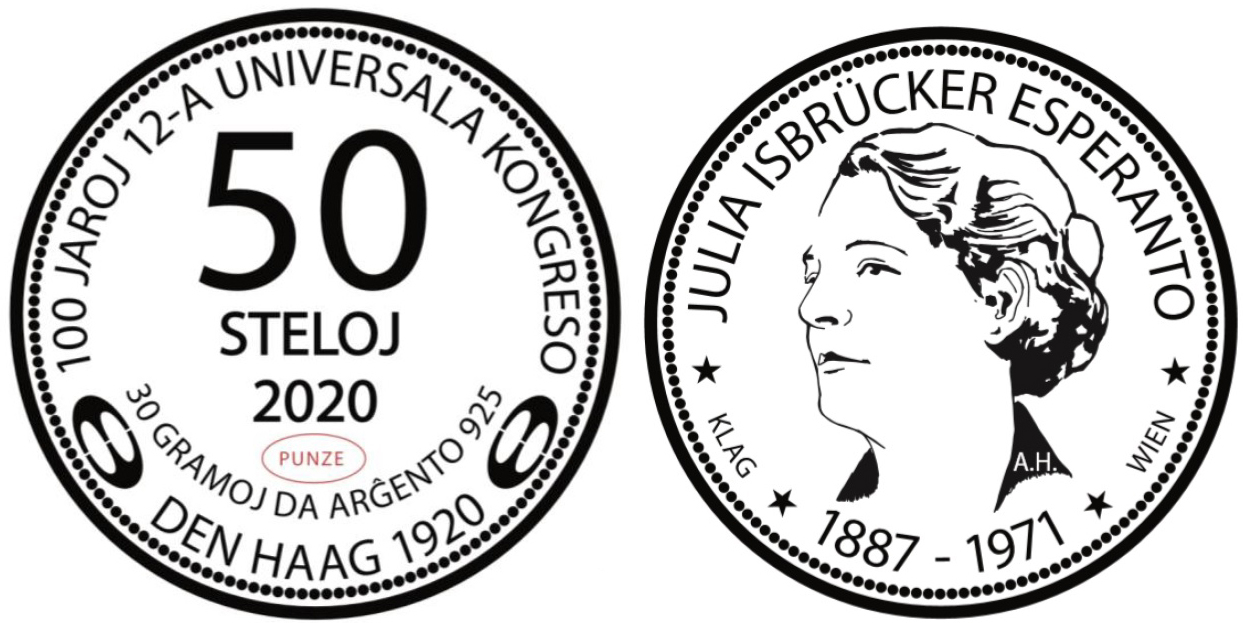

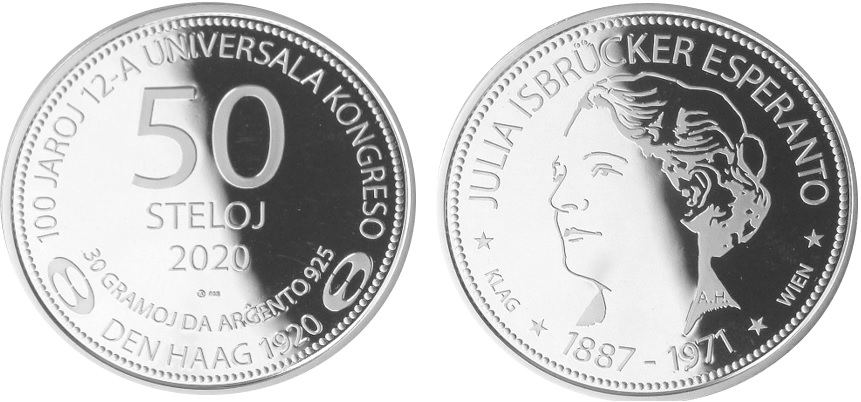

== Esperanto coin 5000 Steloj 2025 platin ==
15,6 g platin 999,5/1000.

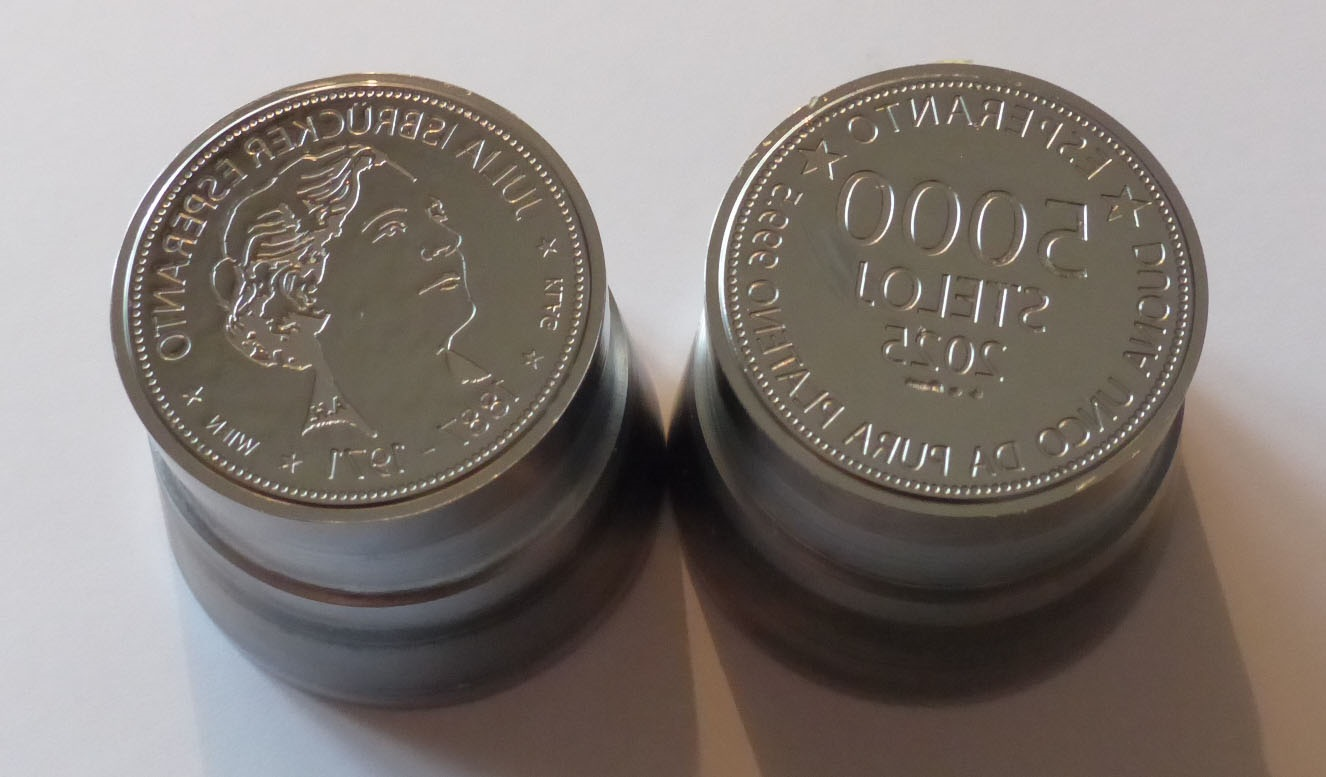

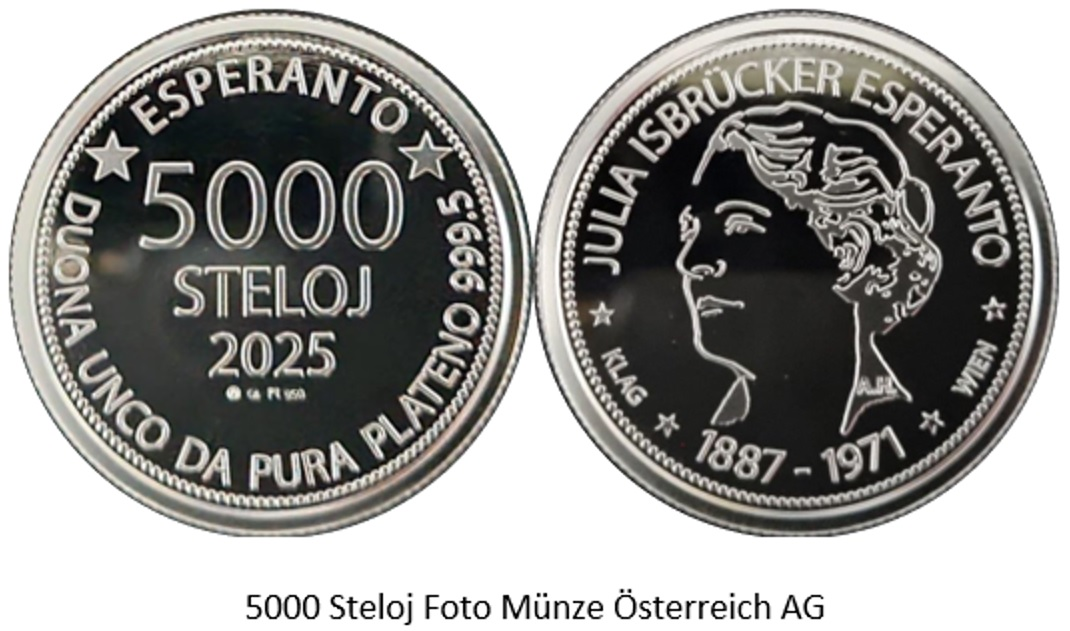

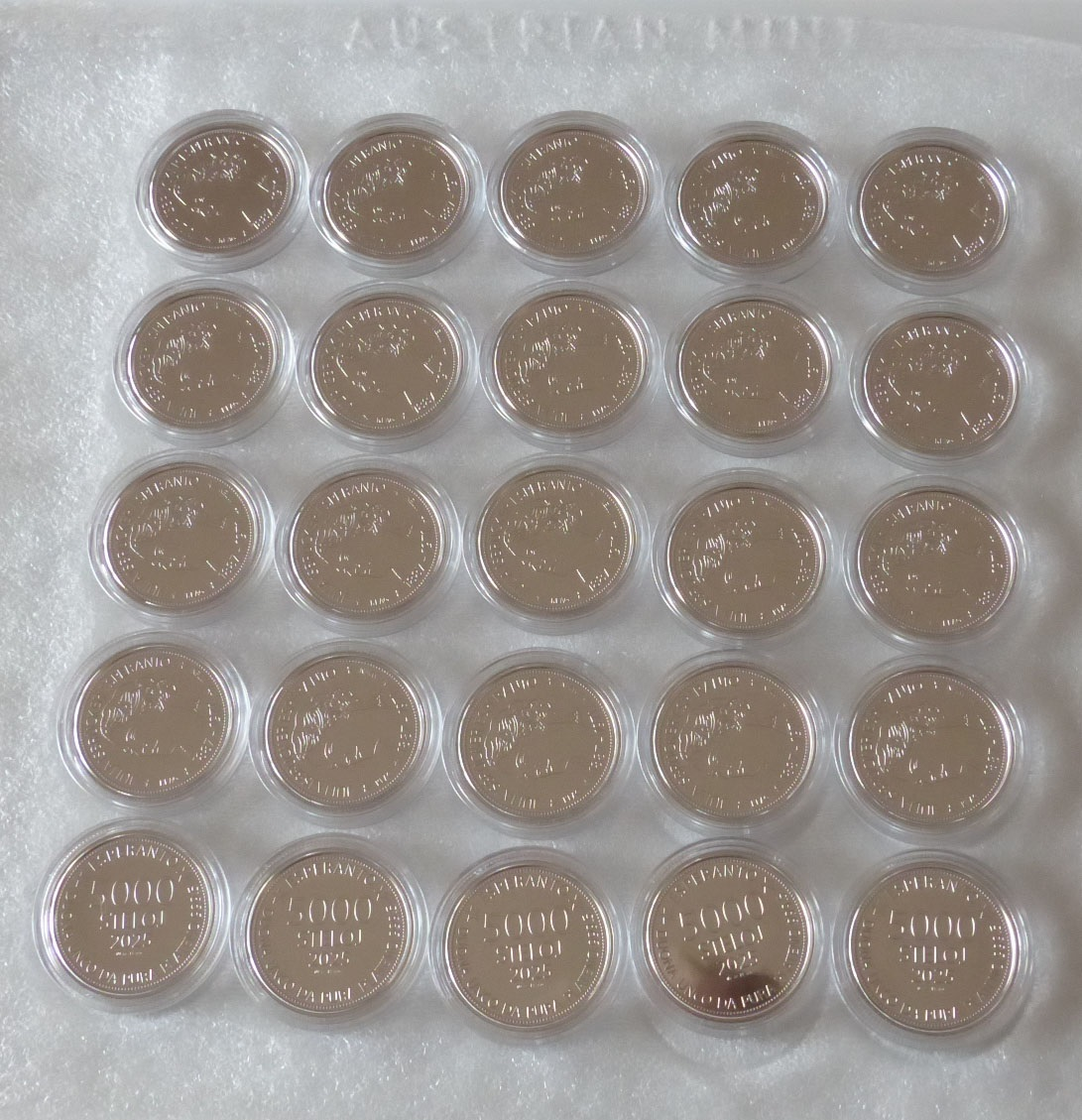

== Esperanto coins and stamps ==
- Belgium — In 1982 an Esperanto postage stamp with a face value of 12 Belgian francs was issued. Several dozen other countries have also issued stamps, especially in 1987 for the 100th anniversary of the publication by L. L. Zamenhof of Unua Libro.
- Cuba — In 1990 on the occasion of the World Esperanto Congress in Havana, Cuba, a 1-peso coin with Esperanto text was minted.
- Croatia — In 1997 a 25-kuna coin with Esperanto text was minted.

== Bibliography ==
(Netherlands) In Dutch:

- "De stabiele munteenheid van de esperantisten: de stelo", from 2000 Yearbook of Europees Genootschap voor Munt- en Penningkunde
- L. M. J. Boegheim, "Esperanto-Betaalpenningen" in De Muntkoerier, 3-1994, pp. 27–33

(United Kingdom) In English:

- "Esperanto and the Dream of a World Currency"
