= Spesmilo =

Obsolete decimal international currency

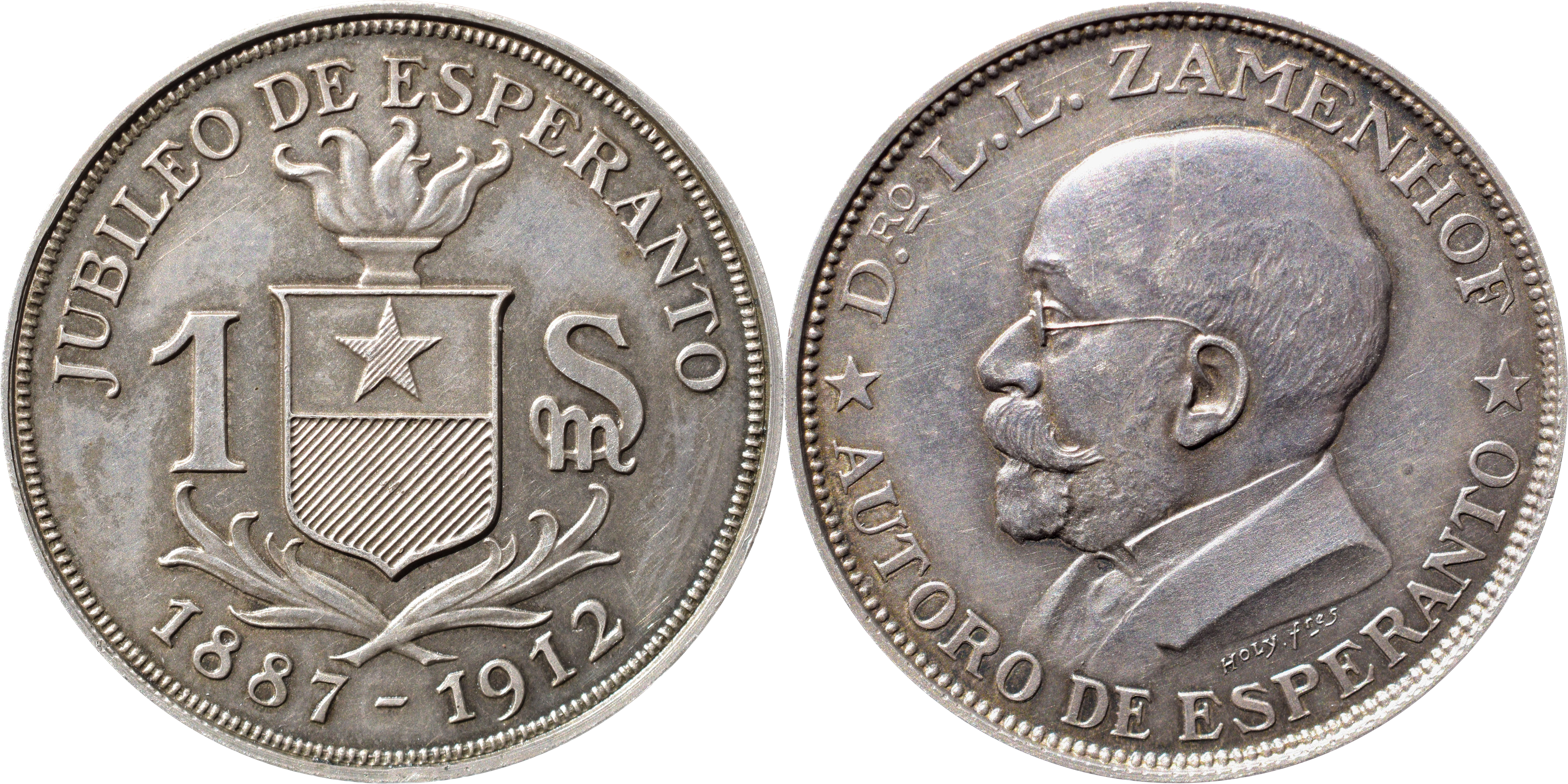
- 1₷ coin

Units of account
- Plural: spesmiloj
- Symbol: ₷
- This infobox shows the latest status before this currency was rendered obsolete.

The spesmilo (pronounced [spesˈmilo], plural spesmiloj [spesˈmiloi̯]) is an obsolete decimal international currency, proposed in 1907 by René de Saussure and used before World War I by a few British and Swiss banks, primarily the Ĉekbanko Esperantista.

The spesmilo was equivalent to one thousand spesoj, and worth 0.733 grams (0.0259 oz) of pure gold (0.8 grams of 22 karat gold), which at the time was about one-half United States dollar, two shillings (one-tenth of a pound sterling) in Britain, one Russian ruble, or 2 1/2 Swiss francs.

The basic unit, the speso (from Italian spesa or German Spesen; spesmilo is Esperanto for "a thousand pennies"), was purposely made very small to avoid fractions.

== Sign ==
Spesmilo sign ⟨₷⟩

The spesmilo sign, called spesmilsigno in Esperanto, is a monogram of a cursive capital "S", from whose tail emerges an "m". The currency sign is often typeset as the separate letters Sm.

In Unicode, the character is assigned U+20B7 ₷ SPESMILO SIGN in version 5.2.

== Miscellaneous ==
- The stelo was another currency unit used by the Universal League from 1942 to the 1990s.
- An Esperanto version of the board game Monopoly uses play money in denominations of spesmiloj.
