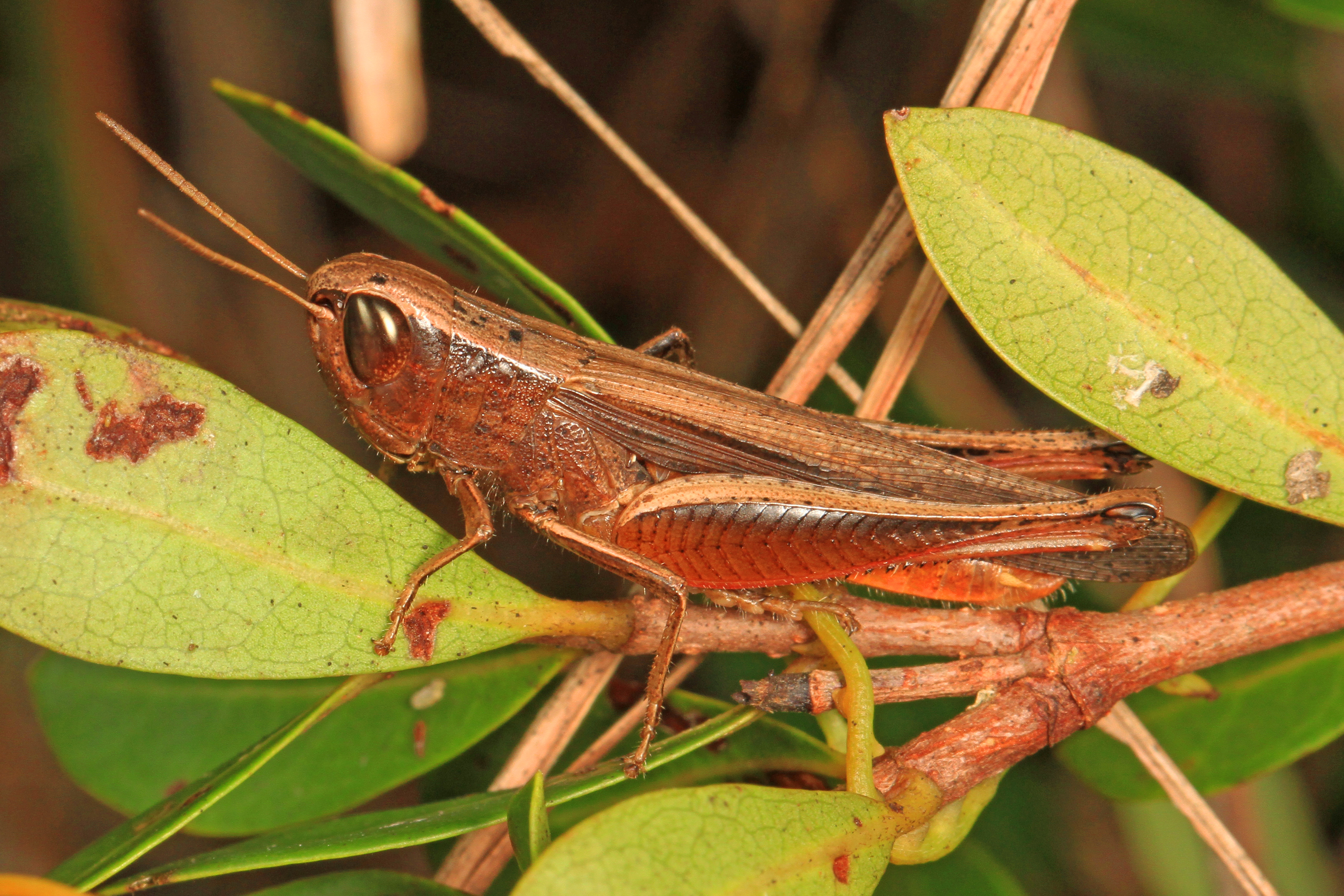
- Amblytropidia mysteca

Scientific classification
- Kingdom: Animalia
- Phylum: Arthropoda
- Class: Insecta
- Order: Orthoptera
- Suborder: Caelifera
- Family: Acrididae
- Subfamily: Gomphocerinae
- Genus: Amblytropidia; Stål, 1873

= Amblytropidia =

Genus of grasshoppers

Amblytropidia is a genus of slant-faced grasshoppers in the family Acrididae. There are about 14 described species in Amblytropidia.

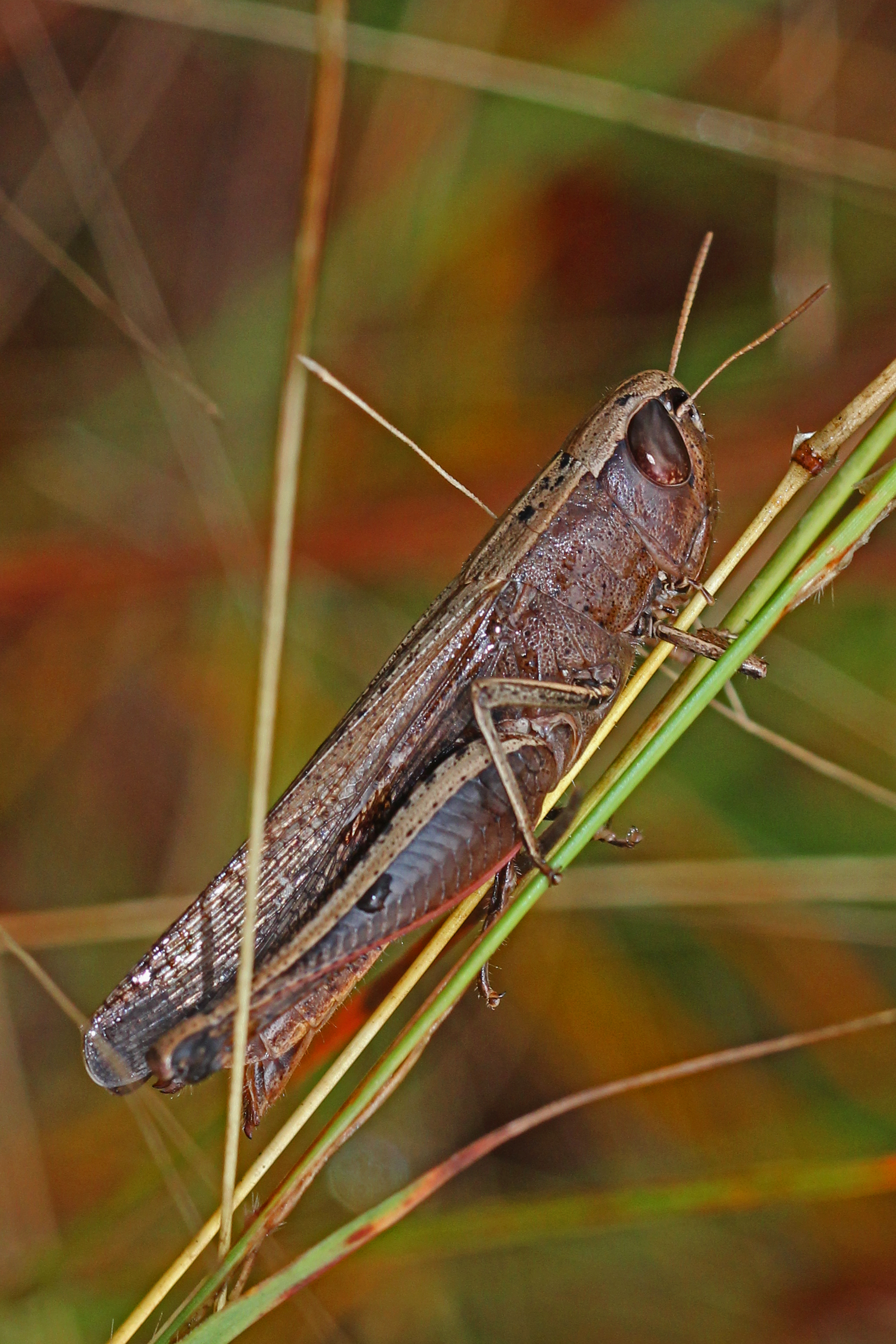
Amblytropidia mysteca

== Species ==
These 14 species belong to the genus Amblytropidia:

- Amblytropidia australis Bruner, 1904
- Amblytropidia chapadensis Rehn, 1906
- Amblytropidia corumbae Bruner, 1911
- Amblytropidia elongata Bruner, 1904
- Amblytropidia ferruginosa Stål, 1873
- Amblytropidia geniculata Bruner, 1911
- Amblytropidia hispaniolana Perez-Gelabert, Dominici, Hierro & Otte, 1995
- Amblytropidia interior Bruner, 1911
- Amblytropidia minor Bruner, 1911
- Amblytropidia mysteca (Saussure, 1861) (brown winter grasshopper)
- Amblytropidia robusta Bruner, 1906
- Amblytropidia sola Rehn, 1939
- Amblytropidia trinitatis Bruner, 1904
- Amblytropidia vittata Giglio-Tos, 1894
