= Léopold de Saussure =

French sinologist

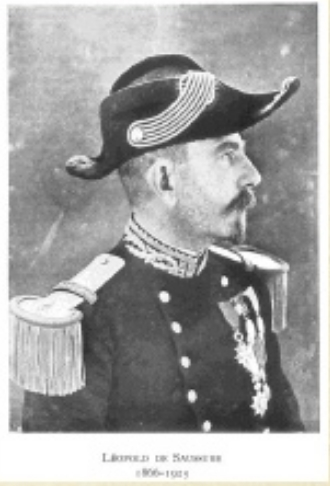
- Born: 30 May 1866; Geneva, Switzerland
- Died: 30 July 1925 (aged 59); Geneva, Switzerland
- Citizenship: French (naturalized)
- Scientific career
- Fields: Chinese astronomy

Léopold de Saussure (30 May 1866 – 30 July 1925) was a Swiss-born French sinologist, pioneering scholar of ancient Chinese astronomy, and officer in the French navy. After a naval career which took him to Indochina, China, and Japan, he quit the service and devoted the remainder of his life to scholarship. He was most famous for his studies of ancient Chinese astronomy.

He was the younger brother of Ferdinand de Saussure, the pioneering linguist and semiotician, the painter Horace de Saussure (1859–1926), and René de Saussure, a Swiss Esperantist and mathematician.

== Career ==
Léopold de Saussure was born in Switzerland, just outside Geneva, in the hamlet Creux de Genthod. His family were Protestants originating in France in Lorraine, who had come to Geneva after the revocation of the Edict of Nantes in 1688. His father, Henri Louis Frédéric de Saussure, was a mineralogist, entomologist, and taxonomist and a constant traveler and explorer who wrote treatises on the insects of Africa and had an encyclopedic range of interests.

From his early teens de Saussure desired to make a career in the navy, an ambition which one historian called "a somewhat problematic undertaking in Switzerland." Saussure, with his father's permission, became a French citizen in order to enlist in the École Navale, and in 1885 went to sea as a cadet. In 1887, he successfully demanded admission to the Ecole des Langues orientales vivantes in Paris.

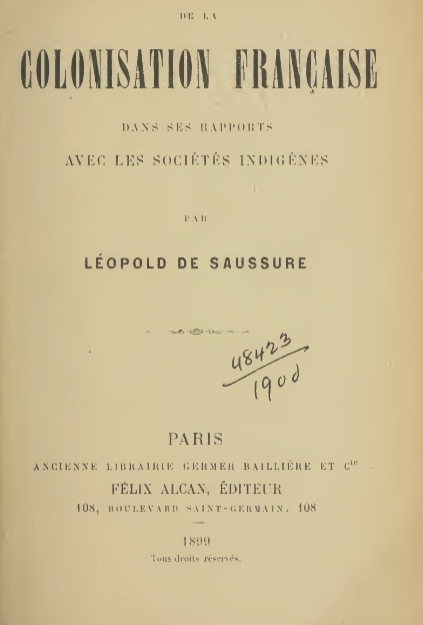
Psychology of Colonisation (1899).

He spent the years 1889–1891 in Indochina, then a French colony, as well as in Japan, but mainly in China, where he served on the gunboat Aspie, which cruised the river Yangtze. De Saussure gathered not only linguistic experience, particularly in Vietnamese, but a stock of anecdotes and ideas concerning Asian history and writings, many of which he later abandoned, however. He participated with the French campaign in Dahomey during the early 1890s before family concerns obliged him to resign his commission.

On his return to France, he applied his energies entirely to research. After publishing an article on Korea, he published his first major work, Psychologie De La Colonisation Française (1899). The volume offered an analysis of the assimilation of the French language among colonialized peoples. He echoed some of the linguistic concepts of his brother, Ferdinand, but subscribed, as Ferdinand did not, to the concept of a "psychological race" modeled on the concept "historical race" offered by Gustave le Bon. De Saussure argued that both the French and Spanish empires would dissolve because they did not recognize the irreconcilable divisions between the superior and lower races, while his linguist brother did not view racial differences as absolute or predetermined.

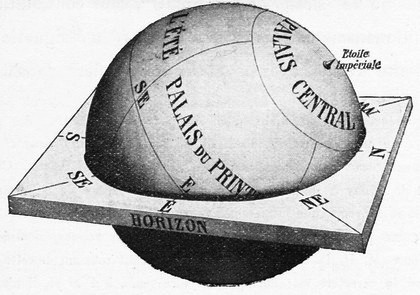
The heavenly spheres from Les Origines De L'astronomie Chinoise.

During the years from 1899 to 1922, de Saussure published dozens of articles, especially in the Paris journal T'oung Pao, the main periodical for sinology in Europe. The subjects included ancient Chinese astronomy, calendars, zodiac, as well as the influence of ancient middle-eastern cultures on China. He argued, however, that Chinese astronomy influenced Babylonian astronomy, opposing those who assumed that China must have been influenced from the outside. A group of these articles were reprinted after his death.

De Saussure died 30 July 1925 in Geneva, after a mysterious illness confined him to bed for almost ten years.

== Scholarly contributions ==
De Saussure, since he had practical experience as a sailor, was able to use his knowledge as a practical navigator to show that even James Legge and other well-known sinologists had not correctly understood the astronomical references in such works as the Shujing. Joseph Needham, the historian of Chinese science, terms Saussure's long series of papers "still indispensable" and says that he possessed "considerable sinological knowledge", though not as much as some.

== Representative works ==
- —— (1899). Psychologie De La Colonisation Française: Dans Ses Rapports Avec Les Sociétés Indigènes. Paris: F. Alcan. Internet Archive.
- —— (1909). "Les origines de l'astronomie chinoise C. la série quinaire et ses dérivés (Suite)". T'oung Pao. 20 (2): 121–182. JSTOR 4526145.
- —— (1920). Le Système Astronomique Des Chinois. Rédaction des archives. Download copy; Pdf (automatic download).
- —— (1920). "Le Voyage Du Roi Mou Au Turkestan Oriental. La Relation Des Voyages Du Roi Mou (Au Xe Siècle Avant J.-C.)". Journal Asiatique: 151–156, 247–280.
- —— (1920). "The Calendar of Mu T'ien-Tsz Chuan". North China Review. 2: 513–16.
- —— (1924). "La Chronologie Chinoise Et L'avènement Des Tcheou". T'oung Pao. 23 (5): 287–346. doi:10.1163/156853224X00275. JSTOR 4526764.
- —— (1923). Origine Babylonienne De L'astronomie Chinoise. Geneve: Institut de physique de l'Université.
- —— (1930). Les Origines De L'astronomie Chinoise. Paris: Librarie orientale et américaine Maisonneuve frères. Reprints 10 articles which appeared in T'oung Pao (1909-1922) on ancient Chinese astronomy, calendars, zodiac, etc.

== References and further reading ==
- Needham, Joseph (1959). Science and Civilisation in China Vol. 3, Mathematics and the Sciences of Heaven and Earth. Cambridge: Cambridge University Press. ISBN 978-0521058018.
- de Saussure, Raymond and Marthe de Saussure (1937). "Léopold de Saussure (1866-1925)". Isis. 27 (2): 286–305. doi:10.1086/347248. JSTOR 225418. S2CID 224842750.
- Joseph, John E (2007). "La Grenouille Ne Devient Pas L'égale Du Boeuf: Les Limites De L'assimilation Linguistique Selon Léopold De Saussure" (PDF). Histoire Épistémologie Langage. 29 (2): 131–143. doi:10.3406/hel.2007.3009.
- Pelliot, Paul (1925). "Léopold De Saussure". T'oung Pao. Second Series. 24 (2/3): 296–300. JSTOR 4526807.
