= Esperanto II =

Esperanto reform of 1937

- Created by: René de Saussure
- Date: 1937
- Setting and usage: International auxiliary language
- Purpose: Constructed language: International auxiliary language; Esperanto; Esperanto II
- Sources: based on Esperanto

Language codes
- ISO 639-3: qet (local use). Also used for Kiaokio.
- Glottolog: None
- IETF: art-x-epotwo

Esperanto II or Esperanto 2 was a reform of Esperanto proposed by René de Saussure in 1937, the last of a long series of such proposals beginning with a 1907 response to Ido with a project called Lingwo Internaciona, later called Antido 1. Esperanto II was one of several languages investigated by the International Auxiliary Language Association, the linguistic research body that eventually standardized and presented Interlingua de IALA.

Several of the grammatical inflections were changed. The accusative is in -u, which replaces the final vowel of nouns, pronouns, and correlatives (ju for ĝin, tu for tion), and for the plural -n is added to both nouns and pronouns (lin "they", lina "their"). Neither suffix affects adjectives, which do not agree with their noun. The correlative series tiu, ĉiu becomes ta, cha when modifying a noun. The indefinite suffix -aŭ is replaced with adverbial -e, and the inchoative -iĝ- becomes -ev-.

Many small grammatical words are also replaced, such as ey for kaj "and", be for ĉe "at", and ki for ol "than". The work of the preposition de "of, by, from" is divided up into several more specific prepositions.

Additionally, the project introduced international cognates when such cognates were readily recognized; for example, skolo was used for "school" in place of standard Esperanto's lernejo (a derivation of lerni, "to learn"); Esperanto has skolo only in the sense of "a school of thought", which is also the meaning that the word has in the example passage below. Antonymic roots such as tarde for malfrue "late" and poke for malmulte "few" are used today in Esperanto poetry, though they resemble Ido and Esperanto may have acquired them from that language.

== Orthography and phonology ==
The orthography and phonology were changed to eliminate diacritics and a few of the more marginal sounds: ⟨j⟩ becomes ⟨y⟩, ⟨ĵ⟩ and ⟨ĝ⟩ conflate to ⟨j⟩, ⟨ŭ⟩ becomes ⟨w⟩, ⟨ĉ⟩ becomes ⟨ch⟩, ⟨ŝ⟩ becomes ⟨sh⟩, ⟨kv⟩ becomes ⟨qu⟩, ⟨kz⟩ and ⟨ks⟩ become ⟨x⟩, ⟨ej⟩ becomes ⟨e⟩.

== Sample ==
Changes from standard Esperanto that involve more than orthography are highlighted in this sample passage and explained below.

Esperanto II
Vizitinte perhazarde la 2-a Universala Kongresu de Esperanto be Genevo (te 1906), mi farevis Esperantisto ey partoprenis tie la fondu de la Int(ernacia) Scienca Asocio Esperantista, kaes mi estis elektata sekretaro. Dum pli longe ki qin yaron mi anke estis chef-redaktoro de la Int(ernacia) Scienca Revuo, la oficiala organo de ta Asocio, kay tiam havis pliente ki 800 membrun. En 1907 okazis la 3-a Universala Kongreso de Esperanto be Cambridge, kaw mi anke beestis ey kie mia projekto de internacia helpmono estis akceptata di la Kongreso. Pos ta Kongreso aperis la riformprojekto Ido, verkita di Markezo de Beaufront ey Prof. Couturat. Mi tuy konsciis, ke ta projekto estas tute ne konforma al la spirito de Esperanto, kaes rimarkinda flexeblu Ido detruis per logika derivsistemo tro rigida por la chataga uzado de la lingvo skribe ey parole, ey dey ta tago mi komencis rifuti la pretendun de Ido en la Int(ernacia) Scienca Revuo. Dum mia laboro por la riformo de Esperanto mi examenis ne nur la projektu Ido, sed anke la interlingvun el la skolo "naturista" (Occidental, Latino sine flexione, etp.). Tala lingvoprojekton estas interesa, sed lina awtoron forgesis, ke la ple malfacila parto de la interlingva problemo ne estas la facila kompreno por la Okcidentanon, sed la facila parolado por cha popolon de la terglobo. Ey lo ankore pli malfacila ne estas krei interlingvu, sed ju vivigi, ey tu sukcesis nur Esperanto; forlasi la bazu Esperanta ey la grandega laboru yam farita di la Esperantiston estus vera frenezajo, tiente pli ke la Esperantiston niam akceptos lingvu tute nova.

Standard Esperanto
Vizitinte perhazarde la 2-an Universalan Kongreson de Esperanto en Ĝenevo (en 1906), mi fariĝis Esperantisto kaj partoprenis tie la fondon de la Int(ernacia) Scienca Asocio Esperantista, de kiu mi estis elektita sekretario. Dum pli longe ol kvin jaroj mi ankaŭ estis ĉef-redaktoro de la Int(ernacia) Scienca Revuo, la oficiala organo de tiu Asocio, kiu tiam havis pli ol 800 membrojn. En 1907 okazis la 3-a Universala Kongreso de Esperanto en Kembriĝo, kiun mi ankaŭ ĉeestis kaj kie mia projekto de internacia helpmono estis akceptita de la Kongreso. Post tiu Kongreso aperis la reformprojekto Ido, verkita de Markizo de Beaufront kaj Prof. Couturat. Mi tuj konsciis, ke tiu projekto estas tute ne konforma al la spirito de Esperanto, kies rimarkindan flekseblon Ido detruis per logika derivsistemo tro rigida por la ĉiutaga uzado de la lingvo skribe kaj parole, kaj ekde tiu tago mi komencis rifuzi la pretendojn de Ido en la Int(ernacia) Scienca Revuo. Dum mia laboro por la reformo de Esperanto mi ekzamenis ne nur la projekton Ido, sed ankaŭ la interlingvojn el la skolo "naturalisma" (Occidental, Latino sine flexione, ktp.). Tiaj lingvoprojektoj estas interesaj, sed iliaj aŭtoroj forgesis, ke la plej malfacila parto de la interlingva problemo ne estas la facila kompreno por la Okcidentanoj, sed la facila parolado por ĉiuj popoloj de la terglobo. Kaj ankoraŭ plej malfacile ne estas krei interlingvon, sed ĝin vivigi, kaj tion sukcesis nur Esperanto; forlasi la bazon Esperantan kaj la grandegan laboron jam faritan de Esperantistoj estus vera frenezaĵo, des pli ke la Esperantistoj neniam akceptos lingvon tute novan.

Translation
"Visiting by chance the 2nd World Congress of Esperanto in Geneva (in 1906), I became an Esperantist and took part there in the founding of the International Scientific Esperantist Association, of which I was elected secretary. For more than five years I was also chief editor of the International Science Journal, the official organ of that association, which then had more than 800 members. In 1907 there was the 3rd World Congress of Esperanto in Cambridge, which I also attended and where my project of international financial aid was accepted by the congress. After that congress there appeared the reform project Ido, worked out by Marquis [sic] de Beaufront and Prof. Couturat. I immediately realized that that project was completely non-conforming to the spirit of Esperanto, whose remarkable flexibility Ido destroyed through a logical derivational system too rigid for everyday use of the spoken and written language, and from that day I began to refute the claims of Ido in the International Science Journal. During my work for the reform of Esperanto I examined not only the Ido project, but also the interlanguages of the "naturalist" school (Occidental, Latino sine flexione, etc.). Such language projects are interesting, but their authors forgot that the most difficult part of the interlanguage problem is not easy comprehension by Westerners, but ease of speech for all the peoples of the Earth. And what is more difficult is not to create an interlanguage, but to make it live, and only Esperanto has succeeded in that; to leave the base of Esperanto and the huge work already done by Esperantists would be true craziness, even more given that Esperantists will never accept a completely new language."

Correspondences

In the order in which they occur in the passage above, these are:

- -u : -on (as Kongresu : Kongreson, fondu : fondon)
- be : ĉe
- te : je (date)
- farevis : fariĝis
- ey : kaj
- kaes : kies
- de kiu. ki : ol
- anke : ankaŭ
- ta : tiu
- kay : kiu?
- pliente ki : more than
- -n : -j (as yaron : jaroj, membrun : membrojn)
- kaw : kiun?
- projekto : projekto (change in pronunciation)
- di : (accepted) by
- pos : post
- cha : ĉiu
- dey : from
- tala : tia
- li-n-a : ili-a (lin for ili is li plus plural -n)
- lo : ?
- ankore : ankoraŭ
- ju : ĝin
- tu : tion
- tiente: ?
- niam : neniam

== Bibliography ==
- De Saussure. 1938. Twelve lessons of Esperanto-II for beginners.
