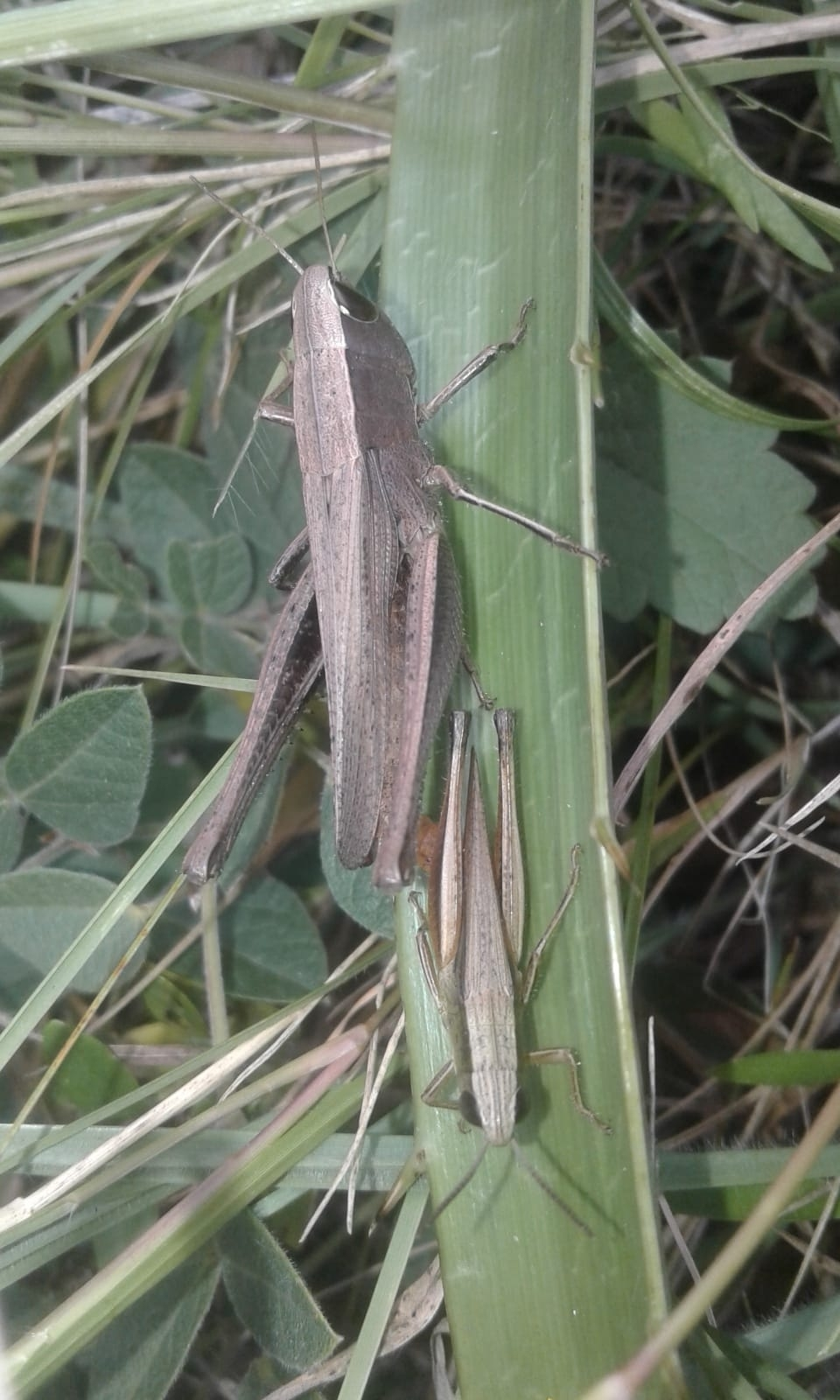
- Amblytropidia australis, Argentina

Scientific classification
- Kingdom: Animalia
- Phylum: Arthropoda
- Clade: Pancrustacea
- Class: Insecta
- Order: Orthoptera
- Suborder: Caelifera
- Family: Acrididae
- Subfamily: Gomphocerinae
- Genus: Amblytropidia
- Species: A. australis

Binomial name
- Amblytropidia australis Bruner, 1904

= Amblytropidia australis =

Species of grasshopper

Amblytropidia australis is a species of slant-faced grasshopper in the family Acrididae. It is found in South America.
