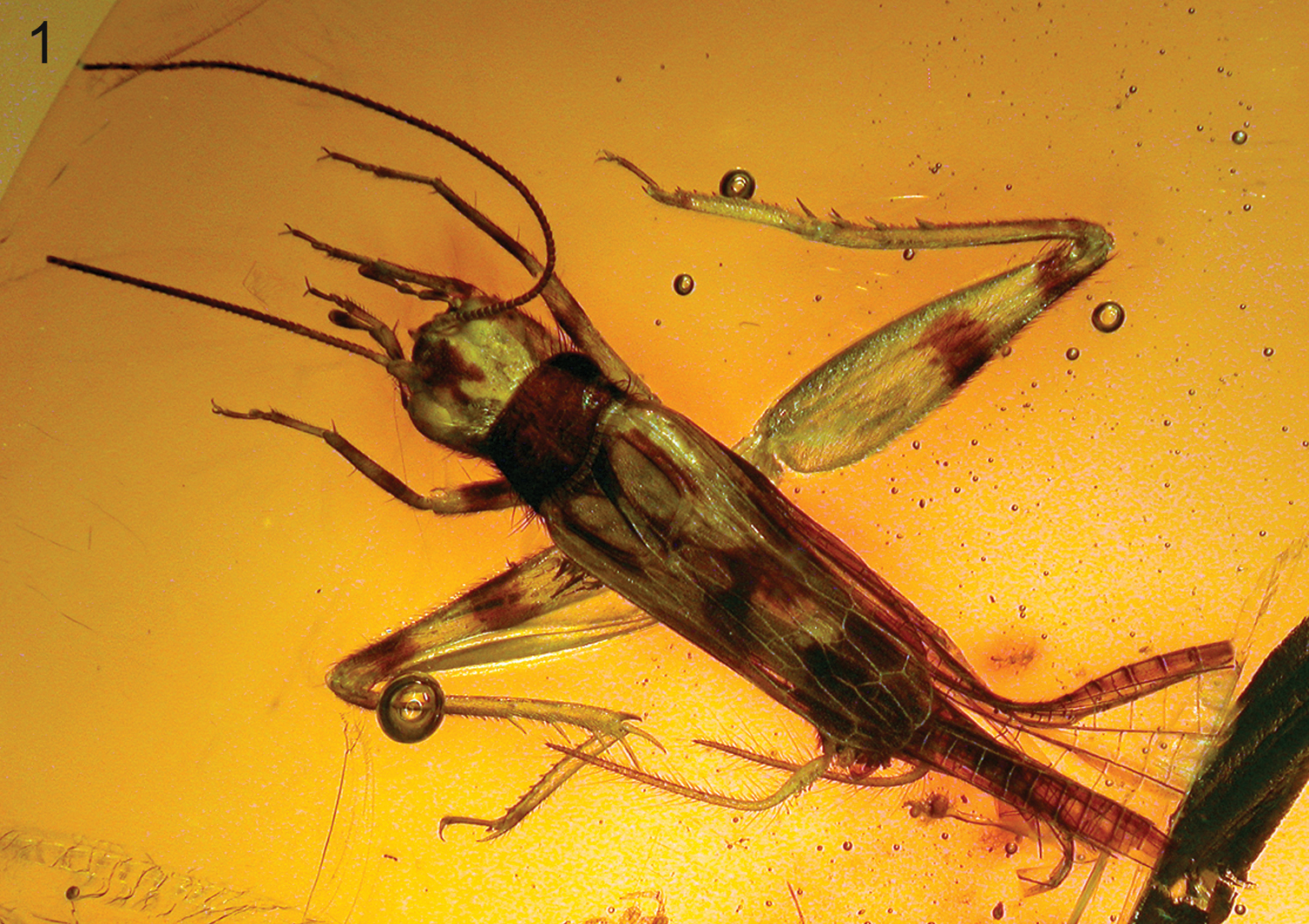
- Proanaxipha madgesuttonae male

Scientific classification
- Kingdom: Animalia
- Phylum: Arthropoda
- Clade: Pancrustacea
- Class: Insecta
- Order: Orthoptera
- Suborder: Ensifera
- Family: Gryllidae
- Subfamily: Pentacentrinae; Saussure, 1878

Tribes
- Aphemogryllini Hubbell, 1938; Homalogryllini Hubbell, 1938; Nemobiopsini Hubbell, 1938; Pentacentrini Saussure, 1878

= Pentacentrinae =

Subfamily of crickets

External image
- Images at iNaturalist

Pentacentrinae is a subfamily of crickets in the family Gryllidae. Sometimes known as 'Silent Litter Crickets', they occur in tropical Asia, Africa and the Americas. The tribe Lissotrachelini Hubbell, 1938 has been moved to the Nemobiinae.

== Tribes and Genera ==
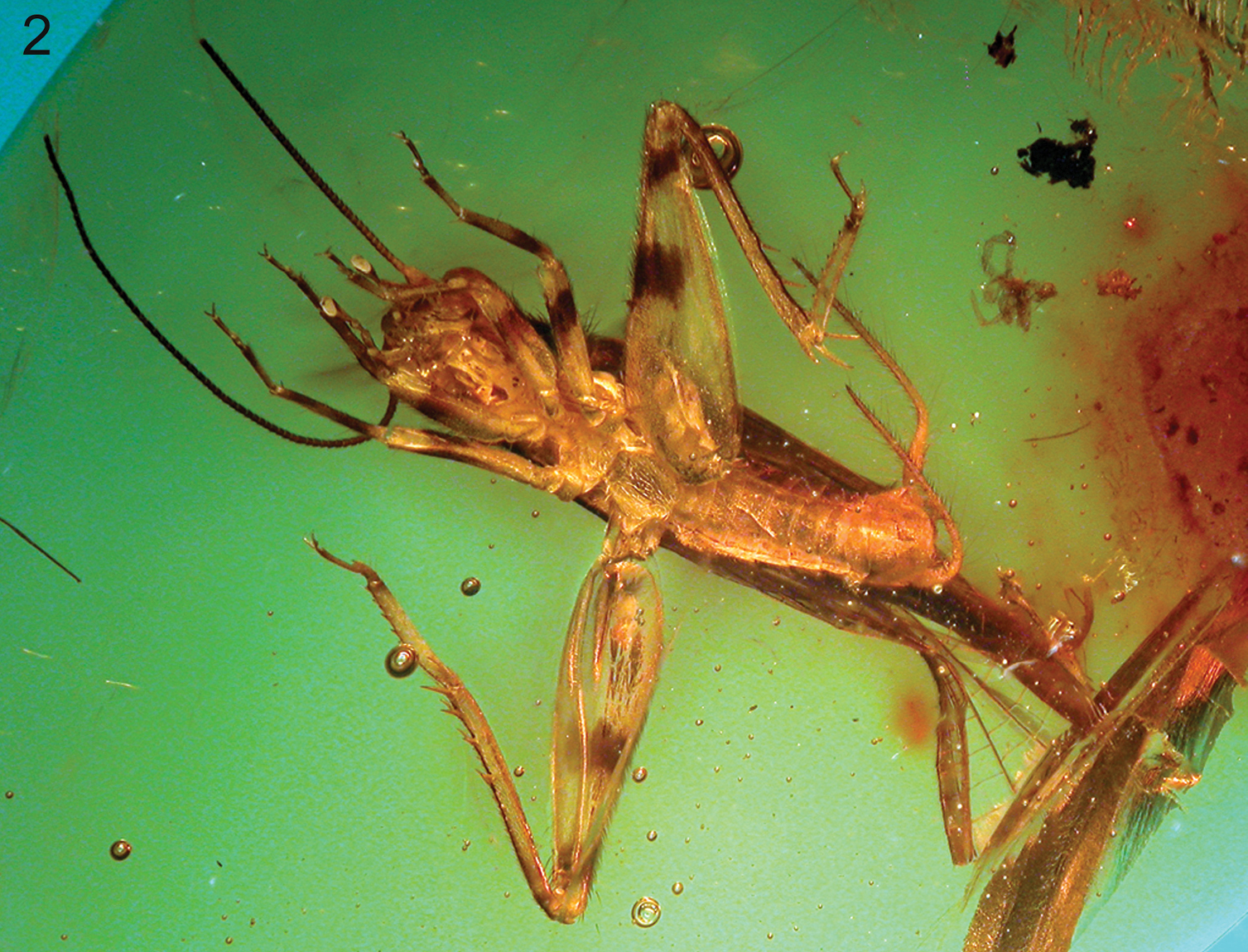
Proanaxipha madgesuttonae underside

These genera, in four tribes, belong to the subfamily Pentacentrinae:

=== Aphemogryllini ===
Distribution: south America

1. Aphemogryllus Rehn, 1918^{c g}

Homalogryllini

Distribution: Sri Lanka

1. Homalogryllus Chopard, 1925^{c g}

=== Nemobiopsini ===
Authority: Hubbell, 1938

1. Nemobiopsis Bolívar, 1890^{c g} - central America
2. Pendleburyella Chopard, 1969^{c g} - west Malesia

=== Pentacentrini ===
Distribution: Africa, Asia, Australia

1. Apentacentrus Chopard, 1934^{c g}
2. Orthoxiphus Saussure, 1899^{c g}
3. Pentacentrodes Bolívar, 1910^{c g}
4. Pentacentrus Saussure, 1878^{c g}

=== tribe not placed ===
1. Trigonidomimus Caudell, 1912^{i c g b}
2. Velapia Otte & Perez-Gelabert, 2009^{c g}
3. † Eopentacentrus Gorochov, 2010^{c g}
4. † Grossoxipha Vickery & Poinar, 1994^{c g}
5. † Proanaxipha Vickery & Poinar, 1994^{c g}

Data sources: i = ITIS, c = Catalogue of Life, g = GBIF, b = Bugguide.net
