= Ĉekbanko Esperantista =

English bank

The Ĉekbanko Esperantista (Esperantist Checking Bank) was a bank founded in 1907 by H. F. Höveler in London.

Deposits and withdrawals were based on the Spesmilo. Transactions were "readily available and inexpensive". On 30 April 1914, there were 730 accounts in 320 cities in 43 countries.

After the death of Höveler in 1918, the bank was liquidated.
