= Henri Louis Frédéric de Saussure =

Swiss mineralogist and entomologist

Henri de Saussure
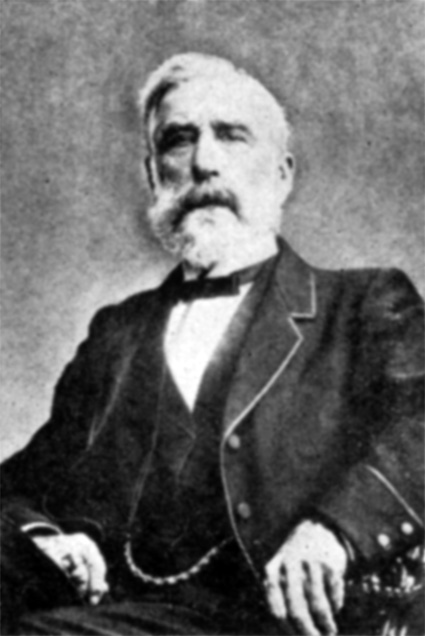
- Born: 27 November 1829; Geneva
- Died: 20 February 1905 (aged 75); Geneva
- Education: University of Giessen
- Children: Ferdinand de Saussure; René de Saussure, 7 more
- Scientific career
- Fields: Entomology, mineralogy

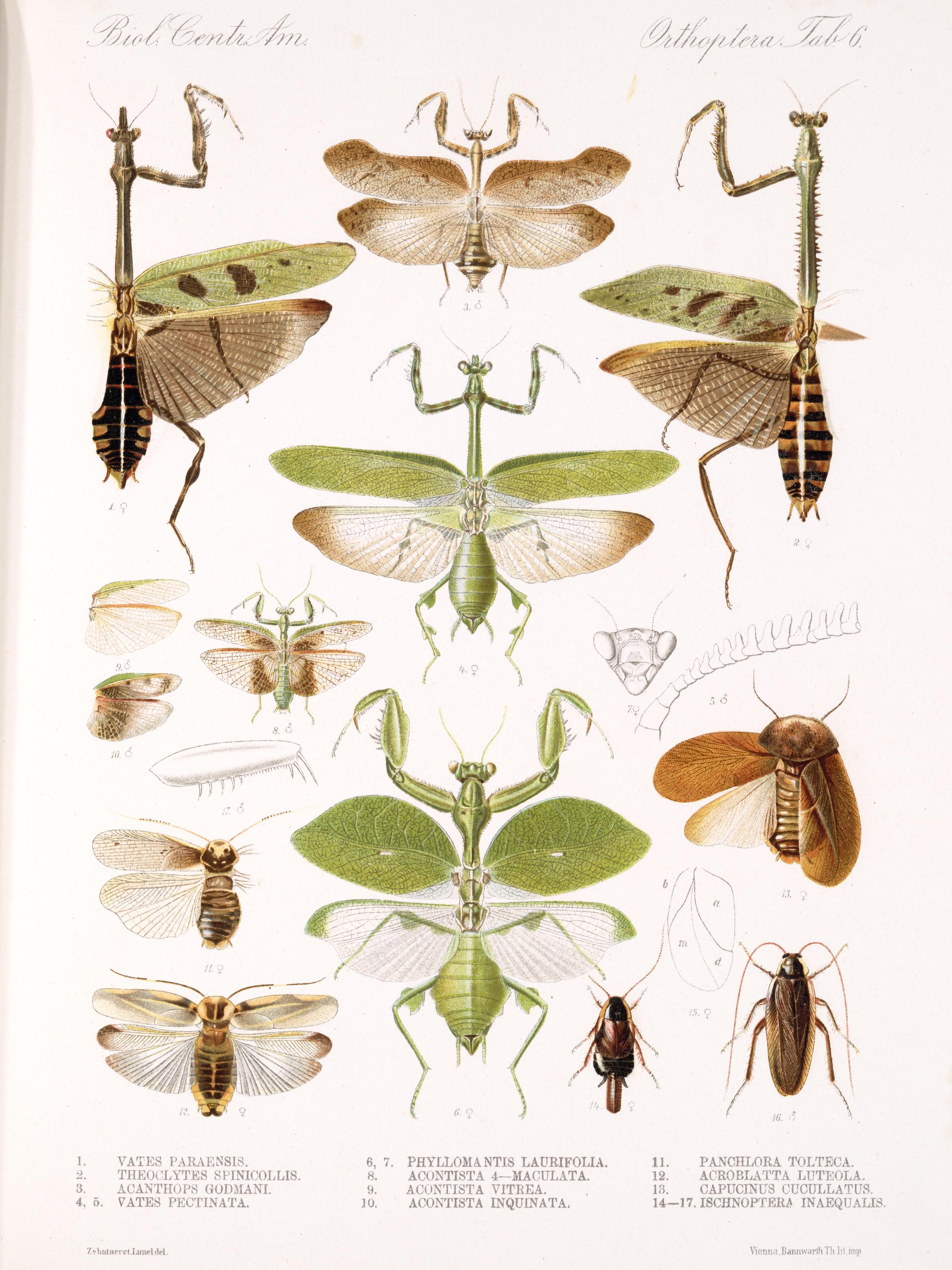
Plate from Biologia centrali-americana. Insecta. Orthoptera

Henri Louis Frédéric de Saussure (/soʊˈsjʊər/; French: [də sosyʁ]; 27 November 1829 – 20 February 1905) was a Swiss mineralogist, taxonomist and entomologist specialising in studies of hymenopteroid and orthopteroid insects.

== Education, career and family ==
Saussure's family was Christian Protestant, originating in Lorraine . His elementary education was at Alphonse Briquet's school and then, as an adolescent, at the Hofwyl school directed by Philipp Emanuel von Fellenberg. He attended the University of Geneva where he was taught by François Jules Pictet de la Rive, who introduced him to entomology. After several years of study in Paris he received the degree of licentiate of the Faculty of Paris and obtained the degree of Doctor from the University of Giessen.

His work concerned mainly the Hymenoptera and Orthoptera, sometime Mtriapoda. His first paper, in 1852, concerned solitary wasps.

In 1854 he traveled to the West Indies, then to Mexico and the United States of America. There he met Louis Agassiz.

He returned to Switzerland in 1856 with collections of American insects, myriapods, crustaceans, birds and mammals. Also interested in geography, geology and ethnology, he co-founded the Geographical Society of Geneva in 1858.

He was also a member of the managing committee of the Natural History Museum of Geneva, ensuring that its collections of Hymenoptera and Orthoptera became one of the best in the world. In 1872 he was made an Honorary Fellow of the Entomological Society of London. In 1873, he was elected as a member to the American Philosophical Society.

He had nine children including the famous linguist Ferdinand de Saussure (1857), who was his eldest son; Horace (1859–1926); Albertine Adèle (1861), named for Henri's aunt and sister-in-law; Elisabeth "Dora" Théodora (1863); Léopold (1866); René de Saussure (1868); Jeanne (c 1869); Louis Octave (1871); and Maximilien (1873).

== Works ==
=== Hymenoptera ===
- Études sur la Famille des Vespides. 1. Monographie des Guêpes solitaires, ou de la Tribu des Euméniens, comprenant la Classification et la Description de toutes les Espèces connues jusqu'à ce Jour, et servant de complément au Manuel de Lepeletier de Saint Fargeau. Paris : Masson pp. 1–128 pls ii-v, vii, x, xiv (1852).
- Note sur la tribu des Masariens et principalement sur le Masaris vespiformis. Ann. Soc. Entomol. Fr. (3)1: xvii-xxi (1853).
- Études sur la Famille des Vespides. 2. Monographie des Guêpes Sociales, ou de la Tribu des Vespiens, ouvrage faisant suite à la Monographies des Guêpes Solitaires. Paris : Masson pp. 1–96 pls 2-8, 13 (1853).
- Études sur la Famille des Vespides. Troisième Partie comprenant la Monographie des Masariens et un Supplément à la Monographie des Eumeniens. Paris : Masson pp. 1–48 pls i-v (1854).
- Mélanges hyménoptérologiques. Extrait du Tome XIV des "mémoires de la Société de Physique etc. Genève, Cherbuliez, Paris, Masson (1854).
- Études sur la Famille des Vespides. 2. Monographie des Guêpes Sociales, ou de la Tribu des Vespiens, ouvrage faisant suite à la Monographies des Guêpes Solitaires. Paris : Masson pp. 97–256 pls 9-12, 14-18, 20-24, 27-33 (1854).
- Études sur la Famille des Vespides. Troisième Partie comprenant la Monographie des Masariens et un Supplément à la Monographie des Eumeniens. Paris : Masson pp. 49–288 pls vi-xiv (1855).
- Études sur la Famille des Vespides. Troisième Partie comprenant la Monographie des Masariens et un Supplément à la Monographie des Eumeniens. Paris : Masson pp. 289–352 pls xv-xvi (1856).
- Mélanges hyménoptérologiques. Mém. Soc. Phys. Hist. Nat. Genève 17: 171-244 (1863).
- Hymenoptera. In, Reise der österreichischen Fregatte Novara um die Erde in den Jahren 1857, 1858, 1859 den unter den Befehlen des Commodore B. von Wüllerstorf-Urbair. Zoologischer Theil. Wien : K-K Hof- und Staatsdrückerei Vol. 2(1a). 138 pp. (1867).

=== Orthoptera ===
- Revue et Magasin de Zoologie. 2(13):128 (1861)
- Essai d'un système des Mantides. Mitt. Schweiz. Entomol. Ges. 3: 49-73 (1869).
- Additions au système des Mantides. Mitt. Schweiz. Entomol. Ges. 3: 221-244 (1870).
- Mélanges Orthoptérologiques. Fasc. 3. Mem. Soc. Phys. Hist. Nat. Genève 21(1): 1-214 (1871).
- Mélanges Orthoptérologiques. Fasc. 3. Mem. Soc. Phys. Hist. Nat. Genève 21(1): 1-214 (1871).
- Mélanges Orthoptérologiques. Supplément au IIIme Fascicule. Mem. Soc. Phys. Hist. Nat. Genève 21(1): 239-336 (1871).
- Mélanges Orthoptérologiques. Fasc. 4. Mem. Soc. Phys. Hist. Nat. Genève 23: 1-160 (1872).
- with Auguste Bormans, comte de, Lawrence Bruner; Frederick Du Cane Godman, Osbert Salvin, Albert P Morse, Alphonse Pictet, Robert Walter, Campbell Shelford, Leo Zehntner Biologia centrali-americana. Insecta. Orthoptera London, Published for the editors by R.H. Porter 1893-1909.
- Saussure, H. de & Zehntner, L. Histoire naturelle des Blattides et Mantides. pp. 147–244 in *Grandidier. A. (ed.) Histoire Physique, Naturelle et Politique de Madagascar. Paris : Librairie Hachette et Cie Vol. 23 Orthoptères (1895).
