= Inflection =

Process of word formation, by alteration to express grammatical categories

Inflection of the Scottish Gaelic lexeme for 'dog', which is cù for singular, chù for dual with the number dà ('two'), and coin for plural

In linguistic morphology, inflection (less commonly, inflexion) is a process of word formation in which a word is modified to express different grammatical categories such as tense, case, voice, aspect, person, number, gender, mood, animacy, and definiteness. The inflection of verbs is called conjugation, whereas the inflection of nouns, adjectives, adverbs, etc. (Note: More include pronouns, determiners, participles, prepositions and postpositions, numerals, and articles.) can be called declension.

== Definition ==
An inflection expresses grammatical categories with affixation (such as prefix, suffix, infix, circumfix, and transfix), apophony (as with Indo-European ablaut), or other modifications. For example, the Latin verb ducam, meaning 'I will lead', includes the suffix -am, expressing person (first), number (singular), and tense-mood (future indicative or present subjunctive). The use of this suffix is an inflection. In contrast, in the English clause "I will lead", the word lead is not inflected for any of person, number, or tense; it is simply the bare form of a verb. The inflected form of a word often contains both one or more free morphemes (a unit of meaning which can stand by itself as a word), and one or more bound morphemes (a unit of meaning which cannot stand alone as a word). For example, the English word cars is a noun that is inflected for number, specifically to express the plural; the content morpheme car is unbound because it could stand alone as a word, while the suffix -s is bound because it cannot stand alone as a word. These two morphemes together form the inflected word cars.

Words that are never subject to inflection are said to be invariant; for example, the English verb must is an invariant item: it never takes a suffix or changes form to signify a different grammatical category. Its categories can be determined only from its context.

Requiring the forms or inflections of more than one word in a sentence to be compatible with each other according to the rules of the language is known as agreement or concord. For example, in "the man jumps", "man" is a singular noun, so "jump" is constrained in the present tense to use the third person singular suffix "-s".

Languages that have some degree of inflection are called synthetic languages. They can be highly inflected (such as Georgian or Kichwa), moderately inflected (such as Russian or Latin), weakly inflected (such as English), but not uninflected (such as most varieties of Chinese). Languages that are so inflected that a sentence can consist of a single highly inflected word (such as many Native American languages) are called polysynthetic languages. Languages in which each inflection conveys only a single grammatical category, such as Finnish, are known as agglutinative languages, while languages in which a single inflection can convey multiple grammatical roles (such as both nominative case and plural, as in Latin and German) are called fusional languages.

Weakly inflected languages which seldom make use of inflection, such as English, are said to be analytic. Analytic languages that do not make use of derivational morphemes, such as Standard Chinese, are said to be isolating. Highly synthetic languages are weakly or not at all analytic and vice-versa, while a middle-ground language like English may exhibit traits of both to varying degrees.

== Examples in English ==
Most native-English nouns are inflected for number with the inflectional plural affix -[e]s (as in dogs ← dog + -s; "glasses" ← glass + -es); most other English nouns are inflected for plurality in some other way, varying by language of loanword origin. Most English verbs are inflected for tense with the inflectional past tense suffix -ed (as in called ← call + -ed). English also inflects verbs by suffixation to mark the third-person singular in the present tense (with -s), and the present participle (with -ing, also used for gerunds). Some English adjectives (mostly those derived from Anglo-Saxon) are inflected to mark comparative and superlative forms, with -er and -est respectively (while those derived from other linguistic substrates, like French and Latin, are instead preceded by the separate words more and most, respectively – a non-inflected genitive construction).

There are eight regular inflectional affixes in the English language.

Inflectional affixes in English
Affix	Grammatical category	Mark	Part of speech
-s or -es (among other approaches from a loanword's origin language)	Number	plural	nouns
--'s or -' or (on pronouns only) -s	Case	genitive (possessive)	nouns and noun phrases; pronouns (marks independent possessive)
-ing	Aspect	progressive	gerunds or participles
-ed or -en	Aspect	perfect	verbs
-ed, uncommonly -t, or archaically/poetically -'d	Tense	past (simple)	verbs
-s or -es	Person, number, aspect, tense	3rd person singular present indicative	verbs
-er (replaced by more before most loanwords)	Degree of comparison	comparative	adjectives and adverbs
-est (replaced by most before most loanwords)	Degree of comparison	superlative	adjectives and adverbs

Despite the march toward regularization, modern English retains traces of its ancestry, with a minority of its words still using inflection by ablaut (sound change, mostly in verbs) and umlaut (a particular type of sound change, mostly in nouns), as well as long–short vowel alternation. For example:

- write, wrote, written (marking by ablaut variation, and also suffixing in the participle)
- sing, sang, sung (ablaut)
- foot, feet (marking by umlaut variation)
- mouse, mice (umlaut)
- child /ˈtʃaɪ.əld/, children /ˈtʃɪld.rən/ (ablaut, and also suffixing in the plural)

== Regular and irregular inflection ==
When a given word class is subject to inflection in a particular language, there are generally one or more standard patterns of inflection (the paradigms described below) that words in that class may follow. Words which follow such a standard pattern are said to be regular; those that inflect differently are called irregular.

For instance, many languages that feature verb inflection have both regular verbs and irregular verbs. In English, regular verbs form their past tense and past participle with the ending -[e]d. Therefore, verbs like play, arrive, and enter are regular, while verbs like sing, keep, and go are irregular. Irregular verbs often preserve patterns that were regular in past forms of the language, but which have now become anomalous; in rare cases, there are regular verbs that were irregular in past forms of the language.

Other types of irregular inflected form include irregular plural nouns, such as the English plurals mice, children, and women and the French yeux (the plural of œil, 'eye'); and irregular comparative and superlative forms of adjectives or adverbs, such as the English better and best (which correspond to the positive forms good or well).

Irregularities can have four basic causes:

1. Euphony: Regular inflection would result in forms that sound esthetically unpleasing or are difficult to pronounce (English far → farther or further; Spanish tener → tengo, tendré vs. comer → como, comeré; Portuguese vs. Spanish andar (in both languages) → Portuguese andaram vs. Spanish anduvieron).
2. Principal parts: These are generally considered to have been formed independently of one another, so they must be memorized when learning a new word and its inflections. Example: Latin dīcō, dīcere, dīxī, dictum → Spanish digo, decir, dije, dicho.
3. Strong vs. weak inflection: In some cases, two inflection systems exist, conventionally classified as "strong" and "weak". For instance, English and German have weak verbs that form the past tense and past participle by adding an ending (English jump → jumped; German machen → machte); versus strong verbs that change vowel, and in some cases form the past participle by adding -en (English swim → swam, swum; German schwimmen → schwamm, geschwommen). Ancient Greek verbs are likewise said to have had a first aorist (ἔλῡσα) and a second aorist (ἔλιπον).
4. Suppletion: The "irregular" form was originally derived from a different root (English person → people; Lithuanian būti → esu/esi/yra). The comparative and superlative forms of good in many languages display this phenomenon (e.g. English good, better, best).

== Declension and conjugation ==
Two traditional grammatical terms refer to inflections of specific word classes:

- Inflecting a noun, pronoun, adjective, adverb, article, or determiner is known as declining it. The forms may express number, case, gender, or degree of comparison.
- Inflecting a verb is called conjugating it. The forms may express tense, mood, voice, aspect, person, or number.

An organized list of the inflected forms of a given lexeme or root word is called its declension if it is a noun, or its conjugation if it is a verb.

Below is the declension of the English pronoun I, which is inflected for case and number.

	singular	plural
nominative	I	we
oblique	me	us
possessive determiner	my	our
possessive pronoun	mine	ours
reflexive	myself	ourselves

The pronoun who is also inflected according to case. Its declension is defective, in the sense that it lacks a reflexive form.

	singular and plural
nominative	who
oblique	whom (traditional), who (informal)
possessive	whose
reflexive	–

The following table shows the conjugation of the verb to arrive in the indicative mood; suffixes inflect it for person, number, and tense:

Tense	I	you	he, she, it	we	you	they
Present	arrive	arrive	arrives	arrive	arrive	arrive
Past	arrived	arrived	arrived	arrived	arrived	arrived

The non-finite forms arrive (bare infinitive), arrived (past participle), and arriving (present participle, gerund), although not inflected for person or number, can also be regarded as part of the conjugation of the verb to arrive. Compound verb forms, such as I have arrived, I had arrived, or I will arrive, can be included also in the conjugation of the verb for didactic purposes, but they are not overt inflections of arrive. The formula for deriving the covert form, in which the relevant inflections do not occur in the main verb, is:

pronoun + conjugated auxiliary verb + non-finite form of main verb.

Conjugations of verbs in other languages are often much more complex, as illustrated below.

=== Inflectional paradigm ===
An inflectional paradigm refers to a pattern (usually a set of inflectional endings), in which a class of words follows the same pattern. Nominal inflectional paradigms are called declensions, and verbal inflectional paradigms are termed conjugations. For instance, there are five types of Latin declension. Words that belong to the first declension usually end in -a and are usually feminine, these words share a common inflectional framework. Meanwhile words that belong to the second declension end in -us, -um, or -er, and are usually masculine or neuter. In Old English, nouns are divided into two major categories of declension, the strong and weak ones, as shown below:

	gender and number					
	Masculine		Neuter		Feminine	
	Singular	Plural	Singular	Plural	Singular	Plural
case	Strong noun declension					
case	engel 'angel'		scip 'ship'		sorg 'sorrow'	
Nominative	engel	englas	scip	scipu	sorg	sorga
Accusative	engel	englas	scip	scipu	sorge	sorga/sorge
Genitive	engles	engla	scipes	scipa	sorge	sorga
Dative	engle	englum	scipe	scipum	sorge	sorgum
case	Weak noun declension					
case	nama 'name'		ēage 'eye'		tunge 'tongue'	
Nominative	nama	naman	ēage	ēagan	tunge	tungan
Accusative	naman	naman	ēage	ēagan	tungan	tungan
Genitive	naman	namena	ēagan	ēagena	tungan	tungena
Dative	naman	namum	ēagan	ēagum	tungan	tungum

The terms strong declension and weak declension are primarily relevant to well-known dependent-marking languages (such as the Indo-European languages, or Japanese). In dependent-marking languages, nouns in adpositional (prepositional or postpositional) phrases can carry inflectional morphemes.

In head-marking languages, the adpositions can carry the inflection in adpositional phrases. This means that these languages will have inflected adpositions. In Western Apache (San Carlos dialect), the postposition -ká’ 'on' is inflected for person and number with prefixes:

	Singular		Dual		Plural	
1st	shi-ká	'on me'	noh-ká	'on us two'	da-noh-ká	'on us'
2nd	ni-ká	'on you'	nohwi-ká	'on you two'	da-nohwi-ká	'on you all'
3rd	bi-ká	'on him'	–		da-bi-ká	'on them'

== Compared to derivation ==
Inflection is the process of adding inflectional morphemes that modify a verb's tense, mood, aspect, voice, person, or number or a noun's case, gender, or number, rarely affecting the word's meaning or class. Examples of applying inflectional morphemes to words are adding -s to the root dog to form dogs and adding -ed to wait to form waited.

In contrast, derivation is the process of adding derivational morphemes, which create a new word from existing words and change the semantic meaning or the part of speech of the affected word, such as by changing a noun to a verb.

Distinctions between verbal moods are mainly indicated by derivational morphemes.

Words are rarely listed in dictionaries on the basis of their inflectional morphemes (in which case they would be lexical items). However, they often are listed on the basis of their derivational morphemes. For instance, English dictionaries list readable and readability, words with derivational suffixes, along with their root read. However, traditional English dictionaries do not list books as an entry separately from book; the same goes for jumped and jump.

== Inflectional morphology ==
Languages that add inflectional morphemes to words are called inflectional languages or inflected languages. Morphemes may be added in several different ways:

- Affixation, or simply adding morphemes onto the word without changing the root;
- Reduplication, repeating all or part of a word to change its meaning;
- Alternation, exchanging one sound for another in the root (usually vowel sounds, as in the ablaut process found in Germanic strong verbs and the umlaut often found in nouns, among others);
- Suprasegmental variations, such as of stress, pitch or tone, where no sounds are added or changed but the intonation and relative strength of each sound is altered regularly.

=== Inflection through reduplication ===
Reduplication is a morphological process where a constituent is repeated. The direct repetition of a word or root is called total reduplication (or full reduplication). The repetition of a segment is referred to as partial reduplication. Reduplication can serve both derivational and inflectional functions. A few examples are given below:

Inflectional Reduplication
Value	Language	Original	Reduplicated
Plurality	Indonesian	buku 'book'	buku-buku 'books'
Distribution	Standard Chinese	ren^{24} 'person'	ren^{24} ren^{24} 'everyone'
Intensity	Taiwanese Hokkien	ang^{24} 'red'	ang^{24} ang^{24} 'reddish'
Imperfective	Ilokano	agbása 'read'	agbasbása 'reading'
Inchoative	Nukuoro	gohu 'dark'	gohu-gohu 'getting dark'
Progressive	Pazeh language	bazu’ 'wash'	baabazu’ 'be washing'

=== Inflection through tone change ===
An example is Tlatepuzco Chinantec (an Oto-Manguean language spoken in Southern Mexico), where tones are able to distinguish mood, person, and number:

Verb paradigm of húʔ, 'bend', in Tlatepuzco Chinantec
	1 SG	1 PL	2	3
Completive	húʔ^{1}	húʔ^{13}	húʔ^{1}	húʔ^{2}
Incompletive	húʔ^{12}	húʔ^{12}	húʔ^{12}	húʔ^{2}
Irrealis	húʔ^{13}	húʔ^{13}	húʔ^{13}	húʔ^{2}

Case can be distinguished with tone as well, as in Maasai language (a Nilo-Saharan language spoken in Kenya and Tanzania):

Case Inflection in Maasai
gloss	Nominative	Accusative
'head'	èlʊ̀kʊ̀nyá	èlʊ́kʊ́nyá
'rat'	èndérònì	èndèrónì

== In various languages ==
=== Indo-European languages (fusional) ===
Because the Proto-Indo-European language was highly inflected, all of its descendant Indo-European languages are inflected to a greater or lesser extent. In general, older Indo-European languages such as Latin, Ancient Greek, Old English, Old Norse, Old Church Slavonic, and Sanskrit are extensively inflected because of their temporal proximity to Proto-Indo-European. Deflexion has caused modern versions of some Indo-European languages that were previously highly inflected to be much less so; an example is Modern English, as compared to Old English. In general, languages where deflexion occurs replace inflectional complexity with more rigorous word order, which provides the lost inflectional details. Most Slavic languages and some Indo-Aryan languages are an exception to the general Indo-European deflexion trend, continuing to be highly inflected (in some cases acquiring additional inflectional complexity and grammatical genders, as in Czech and Marathi).

==== English ====
Old English was a moderately inflected language, using an extensive case system similar to that of modern Icelandic, Faroese, and German. Middle and Modern English lost progressively more of the Old English inflectional system. Modern English is considered a weakly inflected language, since its nouns have only vestiges of inflection (plurals, the pronouns), and its regular verbs have only four forms: an inflected form for the past indicative and subjunctive (looked), an inflected form for the third-person-singular present indicative (looks), an inflected form for the present participle (looking), and an uninflected form for everything else (look). While the English possessive indicator 's (as in "Jennifer's book") is a remnant of the Old English genitive case suffix, it is now considered by syntacticians not to be a suffix but a clitic, although some linguists argue that it has properties of both.

==== Scandinavian languages ====
Old Norse was inflected, but modern Swedish, Norwegian, and Danish have lost much of their inflection. Grammatical case has largely died out with the exception of pronouns, just as in English. However, adjectives, nouns, determiners, and articles still have different forms according to grammatical number and grammatical gender. Danish and Swedish only inflect for two different genders while Norwegian has to some degree retained the feminine forms and inflects for three grammatical genders like Icelandic. However, in comparison to Icelandic, there are considerably fewer feminine forms left in the language.

By contrast, Icelandic preserves almost all of the inflections of Old Norse and remains heavily inflected. It retains all the grammatical cases from Old Norse and is inflected for number and three different grammatical genders. The dual-number forms from Old Norse are, however, almost completely lost.

Unlike in other Germanic languages, nouns are inflected for definiteness in all Scandinavian languages, as in the following case for Nynorsk Norwegian:

Inflection of nouns in Norwegian (Nynorsk)
	Singular		Plural	
	Indefinite	Definite	Indefinite	Definite
masculine	ein bil	bilen	bilar	bilane
masculine	'a car'	'the car'	'cars'	'the cars'
feminine	ei vogn	vogna	vogner	vognene
feminine	'a wagon'	'the wagon'	'wagons'	'the wagons'
neuter	eit hus	huset	hus	husa
neuter	'a house'	'the house'	'houses'	'the houses'

Articles in Norwegian (Nynorsk)
	Singular		Plural	
	Indefinite	Definite	Indefinite	Definite
masculine	ein	-en	-ar	-ane
feminine	ei	-a	-er	-ene
neuter	eit	-et	-	-a

Adjectives and participles are also inflected for definiteness in all Scandinavian languages, as they were in Proto-Germanic.

==== Other Germanic languages ====
Modern German remains moderately inflected, retaining four noun cases, although the genitive started falling into disuse in all but formal writing in Early New High German. The case system of Dutch, simpler than that of German, is also further simplified in common usage. Afrikaans, recognized as a distinct language in its own right rather than a Dutch dialect only in the early 20th century, has lost almost all inflection.

==== Latin and the Romance languages ====
The Romance languages, such as Spanish, Italian, French, Portuguese, and especially – with its many cases – Romanian, have more overt inflection than English, especially in verb conjugation. Adjectives, nouns, and articles are considerably less inflected than verbs, but they still have different forms according to number and grammatical gender.

Latin, the mother tongue of the Romance languages, was highly inflected; nouns and adjectives had different forms according to seven grammatical cases (including five major ones) with five major patterns of declension, and three genders instead of the two found in descendant Romance tongues. Latin inflection included: four patterns of conjugation, in six tenses; three moods (indicative, subjunctive, imperative), plus the infinitive, participle, gerund, gerundive, and supine form; and two voices (passive and active). All were overtly expressed by affixes (passive voice forms were periphrastic, in three tenses).

==== Baltic languages ====
The Baltic languages are highly inflected. Nouns and adjectives are declined in up to seven overt cases. Additional cases are defined in various covert ways. For example, an inessive case, an illative case, an adessive case, and allative case are borrowed from Finnic. Latvian has only one overt locative case but it syncretizes the above four cases to the locative marking them by differences in the use of prepositions. Lithuanian breaks them out of the genitive case, accusative case and locative case by using different postpositions.

Dual form is obsolete in standard Latvian and nowadays it is also considered nearly obsolete in standard Lithuanian. For instance, in standard Lithuanian it is normal to say "dvi varnos (plural) – two crows" instead of "dvi varni (dual)". Adjectives, pronouns, and numerals are declined for number, gender, and case to agree with the noun they modify or for which they substitute. Baltic verbs are inflected for tense, mood, aspect, and voice. They agree with the subject in person and number (not in all forms in modern Latvian).

==== Slavic languages ====
All Slavic languages make use of a high degree of inflection, typically having six or seven cases and three genders for nouns and adjectives. However, the overt case system has disappeared almost completely in modern Bulgarian and Macedonian. Most verb tenses and moods are also formed by inflection (however, some are periphrastic, typically the future and conditional). Inflection is also present in adjective comparation and word derivation.

Declensional endings depend on case (nominative, genitive, dative, accusative, locative, instrumental, or vocative), number (singular, plural, or sometimes dual), gender (masculine, feminine, or neuter) and animacy (animate or inanimate). Declension in most Slavic languages also depends on whether the word is a noun or an adjective; this is a distinction unusual in other language families. Slovene and Sorbian languages use the uncommon dual number between singular and plural. For some words, dual survived also in Polish and some other Slavic languages. Modern Russian, Serbian, and Czech also use a more complex sub-form of plural as a separate inflectional pattern; often called "dual", this misnomer actually applies to numbers 2, 3, and 4, as well as larger numbers ending in 2, 3, and 4 (with the exception of the teens, which are handled as plural); thus, 2, 22, and 102 are "dual", but 7, 12 and 127 are plural).

In addition, in some Slavic languages, such as Polish, word stems are frequently modified by the addition or absence of endings, resulting in consonant and vowel alternation (apophony).

=== Arabic (fusional) ===
Modern Standard Arabic (also called Literary Arabic) is an inflected language. It uses a system of independent and suffix pronouns classified by person and number, with verbal inflections that also mark person and number. Suffix pronouns are used as markers of possession and as objects of verbs and prepositions. The kashida or tatweel (ـ) marks where the verb stem, verb form, noun, or preposition is placed.

			Singular			Plural			Dual		
			Independent Pronoun	Suffix Pronoun	Present Tense Affix	Independent Pronoun	Suffix Pronoun	Present Tense Affix	Independent Pronoun	Suffix Pronoun	Present Tense Affix
Person	First		أَنَا ʾanā 'I'	ـــِـي, ـــيَ, ـــنِي —ī, —ya, —nī	أ ʾ—	نَحْنُ naḥnu	ـــنَا —nā	نـــ n—	(same as plural)		
Person	Second	masc.	أَنْتَ ʾanta 'you'	ـــكَ —ka	تـــ t—	أَنْتُمْ ʾantum	ـــكُمْ —kum	تــــُونَ t—ūn	أَنْتُمَا ʾantumā	ـــكُمَا —kumā	تــــَانِ t—āni
Person	Second	fem.	أَنْتِ ʾanti 'you'	ـــكِ —ki	تــــِينَ t—īna	أَنْتُنَّ ʾantunna	ـــكُنَّ —kunna	تــــْنَ t—na	أَنْتُمَا ʾantumā	ـــكُمَا —kumā	تــــَانِ t—āni
Person	Third	masc.	هُوَ huwa 'he'	ـــهُ —hu	يـــ y—	هُمْ hum	ـــهُمْ —hum	يــــُونَ y—ūna	هُمَا humā	ـــهُمَا —humā	يــــَانِ y—āni
Person	Third	fem.	هِيَ hiya 'she'	ـــهَا —hā	تـــ t—	هُنَّ hunna	ـــهُنَّ —hunna	تــــْنَ t—na	هُمَا humā	ـــهُمَا —humā	يــــَانِ y—āni

Regional Arabic dialects (e.g. Moroccan Arabic, Egyptian Arabic, Gulf Arabic), used for everyday communication, tend to have less inflection than the more formal Literary Arabic. For example, in Jordanian Arabic, the second- and third-person feminine plurals (أنتنّ antunna and هنّ hunna) and their respective unique conjugations are lost and replaced by the masculine (أنتم antum and هم hum), whereas in Lebanese and Syrian Arabic, هم hum is replaced by هنّ hunna.

In addition, the system known as ʾIʿrāb places vowel suffixes on each verb, noun, adjective, and adverb, according to its function within a sentence and its relation to surrounding words.

=== Uralic languages (agglutinative) ===
The Uralic languages are agglutinative, following from the agglutination in Proto-Uralic. The largest languages in the family are Hungarian, Finnish, and Estonian – all European Union official languages. Uralic inflection is, or is developed from, affixing. Grammatical markers directly added to the word perform the same function as prepositions in English. Almost all words are inflected according to their roles in the sentence: verbs, nouns, pronouns, numerals, adjectives, and some particles.

Hungarian and Finnish, in particular, often simply concatenate suffixes. For example, Finnish talossanikinko, 'in my house, too?', consists of talo-ssa-ni-kin-ko. However, in the Finnic languages (Finnish, Estonian, etc.) and the Sami languages, there are processes which affect the root, particularly consonant gradation. The original suffixes may disappear (and appear only by liaison), leaving behind the modification of the root. This process is extensively developed in Estonian and Sami, and makes them also inflected as well as agglutinating languages. The Estonian illative case, for example, is expressed by a modified root: maja → majja (from early form *maja-han).

=== Altaic languages (agglutinative) ===
Though the proposed Altaic languages superfamily is widely considered by linguists to be simply a sprachbund of unrelated languages, three language families united as Altaic by a small subset of linguists – Turkic, Mongolic, and Manchu-Tungus – are agglutinative. The largest languages in this grouping are Turkish, Azerbaijani, and Uzbek, all of which are Turkic. Altaic inflection is, or is developed from, affixing. Grammatical markers directly added to the word perform the same function as stand-alone prepositions and such in English. Almost all words are inflected according to their roles in the sentence: verbs, nouns, pronouns, numerals, adjectives, and some particles.

=== Basque (agglutinative nominal inflection / fusional verb inflection) ===
Basque, a language isolate, is a highly inflected language, heavily inflecting both nouns and verbs.

Noun-phrase morphology is agglutinative and consists of suffixes which simply attach to the end of a stem (and more generally, only once at the very end of the nominal syntagma). These suffixes are in many cases fused with the article (-a for singular and -ak for plural), which in general is required to close a noun phrase in Basque if no other determiner is present, and unlike an article in many languages, it can only partially be correlated with the concept of definiteness. Proper nouns do not take an article, and indefinite nouns without the article (called mugagabe in Basque grammar) are highly restricted syntactically. Basque is an ergative language, meaning that inflectionally the single argument (subject) of an intransitive verb is marked in the same way as the direct object of a transitive verb. This is called the absolutive case and in Basque, as in most ergative languages, it is realized with a zero morph; in other words, it receives no special inflection. The subject of a transitive verb receives a special case suffix, called the ergative case.

There is no case marking concord in Basque; case suffixes, including those fused with the article, are added only to the last word in a noun phrase. Plurality is not marked on the noun and is identified only in the article or other determiner, possibly fused with a case marker. The examples below are in the absolutive case with zero case marking, and include the article only:

txakurr-a	'(the/a) dog'
txakurr-ak	'(the) dogs'
txakur polit-a	'(the/a) pretty dog'
txakur polit-ak	'(the) pretty dogs'

The noun phrase is declined for 11 cases: Absolutive, ergative, dative, possessive-genitive, benefactive, comitative, instrumental, inessive, allative, ablative, and local-genitive. These are signaled by suffixes that vary according to the categories of Singular, Plural, Indefinite, and Proper Noun, and many vary depending on whether the stem ends in a consonant or vowel. The Singular and Plural categories are fused with the article, and these endings are used when the noun phrase is not closed by any other determiner. This gives a potential 88 different forms, but the Indefinite and Proper Noun categories are identical in all but the local cases (inessive, allative, ablative, local-genitive), and many other variations in the endings can be accounted for by phonological rules operating to avoid impermissible consonant clusters. Local case endings are not normally added to animate Proper Nouns. The precise meaning of the local cases can be further specified by additional suffixes added after the local case suffixes.

Verb forms are extremely complex, agreeing with the subject, direct object, and indirect object; and include forms that agree with a "dative of interest" for intransitive verbs as well as allocutive forms where the verb form is altered if one is speaking to a close acquaintance. These allocutive forms also have different forms depending on whether the addressee is male or female. This is the only area in Basque grammar where gender plays any role at all. Subordination could also plausibly be considered an inflectional category of the Basque verb since subordination is signaled by prefixes and suffixes on the conjugated verb, further multiplying the number of potential forms.

Transitivity is a thoroughgoing division of Basque verbs, and it is necessary to know the transitivity of a particular verb in order to conjugate it successfully. In the spoken language only a handful of commonly used verbs are fully conjugated in the present and simple past, most verbs being conjugated by means of an auxiliary which differs according to transitivity. The literary language includes a few more such verbs, but the number is still very small. Even these few verbs require an auxiliary to conjugate other tenses besides the present and simple past.

The most common intransitive auxiliary is izan, which is also the verb for 'to be'. The most common transitive auxiliary is ukan, which is also the verb for 'to have'. (Other auxiliaries can be used in some of the tenses and may vary by dialect.) The compound tenses use an invariable form of the main verb (which appears in different forms according to the "tense group") and a conjugated form of the auxiliary. Pronouns are normally omitted if recoverable from the verb form. A couple of examples will suffice to demonstrate the complexity of the Basque verb:

Liburu-ak saldu dizkiegu.
Book-PL.the sell AUX.3PL/ABS.3PL/DAT.1PL/ERG
'We sold the books to them.'

Kafe-a gusta-tzen zaidak.
Coffee-the please-HAB AUX.ALLOC/M.3SG/ABS.1SG/DAT
'I like coffee.' More literally, 'Coffee pleases me.' (Used when speaking to a male friend.)

The morphs that represent the various tense/person/case/mood categories of Basque verbs, especially in the auxiliaries, are so highly fused that segmenting them into individual meaningful units is nearly impossible, if not pointless. Considering the multitude of forms that a particular Basque verb can take, it seems unlikely that an individual speaker would have an opportunity to utter them all in his or her lifetime.

=== Mainland Southeast Asian languages (isolating) ===
Most languages in the Mainland Southeast Asia linguistic area (such as the varieties of Chinese, Vietnamese, and Thai) are not overtly inflected, or show very little overt inflection, and are therefore considered analytic languages (also known as isolating languages).

==== Chinese ====
Standard (Mandarin) Chinese does not possess overt inflectional morphology. While some languages indicate grammatical relations with inflectional morphemes, Chinese utilizes word order and particles. Consider the following language-contrasting examples:

- Latin:
  - Puer puellam videt.
  - Puellam puer videt.

Both sentences mean 'The boy sees the girl.' This is because puer (boy) is singular nominative, puellam (girl) is singular accusative. Since the roles of puer and puellam have been marked with case endings, the change in position does not matter.

- Modern Standard Chinese:
  - 我给了他一本书; wǒ gěile tā yī běn shū; 'I gave him a book'
  - 他给了我一本书; tā gěile wǒ yī běn shū; 'He gave me a book'

The situation is very different in Chinese. Since Modern Chinese makes no use of inflection, the relationship between wǒ ('I' or 'me') and tā ('he' or 'him') can only be determined by their position.

English, in contrast to both of the above, uses word order/position to establish relationships between words and steer overall sentence meaning, but also reinforces this approach with inflection, which may permit limited word order changes. (Note: The ancestral Old English (Anglo-Saxon) was more inflected, and had a much more Latin-like flexibility of word order, with Middle English showing more order inflexibility over time as various inflectional affixes became obsolescent. Modern English word order can be altered poetically in various ways, producing an archaic-seeming or "Yoda-esque" sentence structure that can still be parsed (sometimes with diffculty) by contemporary readers/listeners because of the inflectional morphology. The most common such poetic shift is to object–subject/agent–verb (OSV) order; example: "Far lands from him she now travels", in which the inflectional cues – e.g. "travel" being inflected with -s, and the functional differences between the "she" vs. a "her" or a "hers" – make it comprehensible.)

In Classical Chinese, pronouns were overtly inflected to mark case. However, these overt case forms are no longer used; most of the alternative pronouns are considered archaic in modern Mandarin Chinese. Classically, 我; wǒ was used solely as the first-person accusative, while 吾; wú was generally used as the first-person nominative.

Certain varieties of Chinese are known to express meaning by means of tone change, although further investigations are required. Tone change is a morphologically conditioned alternation used as an inflectional or derivational strategy. It is distinguished from tone sandhi, a compulsory change that occurs when certain tones are juxtaposed. Examples of tone change from Taishanese and Zhongshan dialect (both Yue dialects spoken in Guangdong Province) are shown below (The superscripted numbers indicate the Chao tone numerals):

- Taishanese

ngwoi^{33}	‘I’ (singular)
ngwoi^{22}	‘we’ (plural)

- Zhongshan dialect

hy^{22}	‘go’
hy^{35}	‘gone’ (perfective)

The following table compares the personal pronouns of Sixian dialect of Taiwanese Hakka with Zaiwa and Jingpho (both Tibeto-Burman languages spoken in Yunnan and Myanmar/Burma).

Comparison of Personal Pronouns
	Sixian	Zaiwa	Jingpho
1 Nom	ŋai^{11}	ŋo^{51}	ŋai^{33}
1 Gen	ŋa^{24} or ŋai^{11} ke^{55}	ŋa^{55}	ŋjeʔ^{55}
1 Acc	ŋai^{11}	ŋo^{31}	ŋai^{33}
2 Nom	ŋ̍^{11}	naŋ^{51}	naŋ^{33}
2 Gen	ŋia^{24} or ŋ̍^{11} ke^{55}	naŋ^{55}	naʔ^{55}
2 Acc	ŋ̍^{11}	naŋ^{31}	naŋ^{33}
3 Nom	ki^{11}	jaŋ^{31}	khji^{33}
3 Gen	kia^{24} or ki^{11} ke^{55}	jaŋ^{51}	khjiʔ^{55}
3 Acc	ki^{11}	jaŋ^{31}	khji^{33}

=== Japanese (agglutinative) ===
Japanese shows a high degree of overt inflection of verbs, less so of adjectives, and very little of nouns, but it is mostly strictly agglutinative and extremely regular. Fusion of morphemes may happen in colloquial speech, for example: the causative-passive 〜せられ〜 (-serare-) fuses into 〜され〜 (-sare-), as in 行かされる (ikasareru, 'is made to go'), and the non-past progressive 〜ている (-teiru) fuses into 〜てる (-teru) as in 食べてる (tabeteru, 'is eating'). Formally, every noun phrase must be marked for case, but this is done by invariable particles (clitic postpositions). (Many grammarians consider Japanese particles to be separate words, and therefore not an inflection, while others view them as agglutinative affixes, and therefore consider Japanese nouns to be inflected.)

=== Auxiliary languages ===
Some international auxiliary languages, such as Lingua Franca Nova, Glosa, and Frater, have no inflection. Other auxiliary languages, such as Esperanto, Ido, and Interlingua have comparatively simple inflectional systems. Some on the contrary, like Volapük, are highly inflected (though perfectly regular).

==== Esperanto ====
In Esperanto, an agglutinative language, nouns and adjectives are inflected for case (nominative or accusative) and number (singular or plural), according to a simple paradigm without irregularities. Verbs are not inflected for person or number, but they are inflected for tense (past, present, or future) and mood (indicative, infinitive, conditional, or jussive). They also form active and passive participles, which may be past, present, or future. All verbs are regular.

==== Ido ====
Ido has a different form for each verbal tense (past, present, future, volitive, and imperative) plus an infinitive, and both a present and past participle. There are, however, no verbal inflections for person or number, and all verbs are regular.

Nouns are marked for number (singular or plural), and the accusative case may be shown in certain situations, typically when the direct object of a sentence precedes its verb. On the other hand, adjectives are unmarked for gender, number, or case (unless they stand on their own, without a noun, in which case they take on the same desinences as the missing noun would have taken). The definite article la ('the') remains unaltered regardless of gender or case, and also of number, except when there is no other word to show plurality. Pronouns are identical in all cases, though exceptionally the accusative case may be marked, as for nouns.

==== Interlingua ====
Interlingua, in contrast with the Romance languages, has almost no irregular verb conjugations, and its verb forms are the same for all persons and numbers. It does, however, have compound verb tenses similar to those in the Romance, Germanic, and Slavic languages: ille ha vivite, 'he has lived'; illa habeva vivite, she had lived. Nouns are inflected by number, taking a plural -s, but rarely by gender (only when referring to a male or female being). Interlingua has no noun–adjective agreement by gender, number, or case. As a result, adjectives ordinarily have no inflections. They may take the plural form if they are being used in place of a noun: le povres, 'the poor'.

== See also ==
- Agreement (linguistics)
- Diction
- Intonation (linguistics)
- Introflection
- ʾIʿrab
- Lexeme
- Marker (linguistics)
- Morpheme
- Nominal TAM
- Periphrasis
- Righthand head rule
- Suppletion
- Synthetic language
- Tense–aspect–mood
- Uninflected word
- Linguistic relativity

== Citations ==
=== References ===
- Agirre, E.; et al. (1992). "XUXEN: A spelling checker/corrector for Basque based on two-level morphology". Proceedings of the Third Conference of Applied Natural Language Processing (PDF). pp. 119–125. Archived (PDF) from the original on 30 September 2005.
- Bubeník, Vit (1999). An introduction to the study of morphology. Coursebooks in Linguistics ser., no. 7. Munich: LinCom Europa. ISBN 3-89586-570-2.
