= Gloss =

Gloss may refer to:

== Text ==
- Gloss (annotation), a brief explanatory note, translation or definition for a word or phrase in a text, inserted after the original in the margin or between the lines. Or more specifically:
  - For an entry in a dictionary or glossary, the gloss is the text of each definition given for that entry
  - Interlinear gloss, in linguistics and pedagogy, the explanatory gloss text placed between lines of original text and their translation
  - Biblical gloss, explanatory gloss text annotating a biblical manuscript or printed scripture
- Glose or Gloss, a quatrain from a usually better known poem incorporated into a new poem

== Shininess ==
- Gloss (optics), reflectivity of light on a surface
- Gloss and matte paint, terms used for painted finishes
- Lip gloss
- Sickle-gloss, a silica residue found on blades

== Fiction ==
- Gloss (character), a fictional character who appeared in DC Comics' series New Guardians
- Gloss (film), a Russian satirical melodrama by Andrei Konchalovsky
- Gloss (TV series), a New Zealand television drama, which ran from 1987 to 1990
- Gloss, a minor character in The Hunger Games

== People ==
- Hugo Gloss (born 1985), Brazilian journalist and presenter
- Molly Gloss (born 1944), American writer

== Other uses ==
- Dillon v. Gloss, a 1921 U.S. constitutional court case
- Global Sea Level Observing System, an Intergovernmental Oceanographic Commission program
- G.L.O.S.S., a punk band based in Olympia, Washington
- GLOSS FM, an online radio station based in South Gloucestershire, UK

== See also ==
- Glossa (disambiguation)
