= IJDB =

IJDB may refer to:

- International Journal of Developmental Biology, a scientific journal in biology
- The Internet Juggling Database (not active anymore)
- Internet Jokes Database, a collection of funny jokes to share and laugh
