= Glossa =

Glossa (γλῶσσα) is a Greek word meaning "tongue" or "language", used in several English words including gloss, glossary, glossitis, and others.

Glossa may also refer to:

- Glossa (journal), a peer-reviewed academic journal of linguistics established as a successor to Lingua
- Glossa, Skopelos, a village in the island of Skopelos in the Northern Sporades
- Glossa Music, a Spanish record label
- Glossa Ordinaria, a medieval scholarly Bible in which the text is surrounded by learned commentary
- Possible misspelling of Glosa, a constructed language

== See also ==
- Glosa
- Gloss (disambiguation)
