= Enid Charles =

British statistician

Dorothy Enid Charles (29 December 1894 – 26 March 1972) was a British socialist, feminist and statistician who was a pioneer in the fields of demography and population statistics.

She was born in Denbigh, Wales. She obtained a bachelor's degree in mathematics, economics and statistics at Newnham College, Cambridge, where she became friends with Dorothy (Dodo) Crowther, sister of the writer James Crowther. She gained a Ph.D. in physiology from the University of Cape Town, South Africa.

Charles met the conscientious objector Lancelot Hogben while at Cambridge; they married in 1918. Out of a dozen or so socialist and feminist couples in Britain in the early 20th century, Charles was the only wife to keep her name. The couple, who had two sons and two daughters, separated in 1953 and divorced in 1957.

Charles worked on fertility rates and marriage rates for the Dominion Bureau of Statistics in Canada. In 1934, Charles projected drastic decline in population of the United Kingdom if fertility rates continued to fall. These results led her to speak out against the then commonly accepted principle of eugenics. She subsequently worked as a Regional Adviser in Epidemiology and Health Statistics and as a Population Statistics Consultant for the World Health Organization in Singapore and New Delhi.

She died in Torquay, England, in 1972, aged 77.

== Bibliography ==
- Charles, E (1931), "Metabolic Changes Associated with Pigmentary Effector Activity and Pituitary Removal in Xenopus Laevis.—I. Respiratory Exchange", Proceedings of the Royal Society B: Biological Sciences, 107 (753): 486–503, Bibcode:1931RSPSB.107..486C, doi:10.1098/rspb.1931.0010
- Hogben, L; Charles, E; David Slome (1931), "Studies On The Pituitary: VIII. The Relation Of The Pituitary Gland To Calcium Metabolism And Ovarian Function In Xenopus", J. Exp. Biol., 8: 345–354, doi:10.1242/jeb.8.4.345
- Zoond, A; Charles, E (1931), "Studies in the Localisation of Respiratory Exchange in Invertebrates: I. The Respiratory Mechanism of the Fresh-Water Crab Potamonautes", J. Exp. Biol., 8: 250–257, doi:10.1242/jeb.8.3.250
- Charles, E (1932), The Practice of Birth Control, London: Williams and Norgate, OCLC 253047932
- Hogben, L; Charles, E (1932), "Studies on the Pituitary: IX. Changes in Blood Calcium Following Injection of Anterior Lobe Extracts and Sexual Excitement in Female Rabbits", J. Exp. Biol., 9: 139–148, doi:10.1242/jeb.9.2.139
- Charles, E (1934), The Twilight of Parenthood: A Biological Study of the Decline of Population Growth, London: Watts and Company
- Charles, E (1936), The Menace of Underpopulation: A Biological Study of the Decline of Population Growth, London: Watts and Company
- Charles, E (1937), "The Changing Structure of the Family in Australia", Economica, 4 (15), Economica, Vol. 4, No. 15: 245–273, doi:10.2307/2548953, JSTOR 2548953
- Charles, E.; Moshinsky, P. (1938), "Differential Fertility in England and Wales during the Past Two Decades", in L. Hogben (ed.), Political Arithmetic, London: Allen and Unwin, pp. 106–160
- Charles, E (1941), "The Nuptiality Problem with Special Reference to Canadian Marriage Statistics", Canadian Journal of Economics and Political Science, 2: 477
- Charles, E (1942), "The Trend of Fertility in Prince Edward Island", The Canadian Journal of Economics and Political Science, 8 (2), The Canadian Journal of Economics and Political Science / Revue canadienne d'Economique et de Science politique, Vol. 8, No. 2: 213–246, doi:10.2307/136951, JSTOR 136951
- Charles, E (1943), "Differential Fertility in Canada, 1931", The Canadian Journal of Economics and Political Science, 9 (2), The Canadian Journal of Economics and Political Science / Revue canadienne d'Economique et de Science politique, Vol. 9, No. 2: 175–218, doi:10.2307/137418, JSTOR 137418
- Charles, E (1946), The Changing Size of the Family in Canada, Ottawa: Dominion Bureau of Statistics
- Charles, E (January 1951), "Statistical Utilization of Maternity and Child Welfare Records", Br J Soc Med, 5 (1): 41–61, doi:10.1136/jech.5.1.41, PMC 1012565, PMID 14839232
- Charles, E (April 1953), "The Hour of Birth: A Study of the Distribution of Times of Onset of Labour and of Delivery throughout the 24-hour Period", Br J Prev Soc Med, 7 (2): 43–59, doi:10.1136/jech.7.2.43, PMC 1058488, PMID 13051536

== See also ==
- Leslie Hogben, granddaughter of Enid
