= Lancelot Hogben =

British zoologist and statistician (1895-1975)

Lancelot Thomas Hogben
- Born: 9 December 1895; Portsmouth, England
- Died: 22 August 1975 (aged 79); Wrexham, Wales
- Education: Trinity College, Cambridge; University of London
- Occupations: experimental zoologist, medical statistician
- Spouse: Enid Charles
- Scientific career
- Workplaces: University of Edinburgh; University of Cape Town; London School of Economics; University of Aberdeen; University of Birmingham
- Doctoral advisor: Ernest MacBride
- Doctoral students: Horace Waring

Lancelot Thomas Hogben FRS FRSE (9 December 1895 – 22 August 1975) was a British experimental zoologist and medical statistician. He developed the African clawed frog (Xenopus laevis) as a model organism for biological research in his early career, attacked the eugenics movement in the middle of his career, and wrote popular books on science, mathematics and language in his later career.

== Early life and education ==
Hogben was born and raised in Southsea near Portsmouth in Hampshire. He attended Tottenham County School in London, his family having moved to Stoke Newington, where his mother had grown up, in 1907, and then as a medical student studied physiology at Trinity College, Cambridge. Hogben had matriculated into the University of London as an external student before he could apply to Cambridge and he graduated as a Bachelor of Science (BSc) in 1914. He took his Cambridge degree in 1915, graduating with an Ordinary BA. He had acquired socialist convictions, changing the name of the university's Fabian Society to Socialist Society and went on to become an active member of the Independent Labour Party. Later in life he preferred to describe himself as 'a scientific humanist'.

In the First World War he was a pacifist, and joined the Quakers. He worked for six months with the Red Cross in France, under the auspices of the Friends' War Victims Relief Service and then the Friends' Ambulance Unit. He then returned to Cambridge, and was imprisoned in Wormwood Scrubs as a conscientious objector in 1916. His health collapsed and he was released in 1917. His brother George was also a conscientious objector, serving with the Friends' Ambulance Unit.

== Career ==
After a year's convalescence he took lecturing positions in London universities and in 1921 he became a Doctor of Science (D.Sc.) in Zoology of the University of London. He moved in 1922 to the University of Edinburgh and its Animal Breeding Research Department. In 1923, Hogben was a founder of the Society for Experimental Biology and its organ the British Journal of Experimental Biology (renamed Journal of Experimental Biology in 1930), along with Julian Huxley and geneticist Francis Albert Eley Crew (1886–1973). According to Gary Werskey, Hogben was the only one of the founders not holding any eugenic ideas. In 1923 he was also elected a Fellow of the Royal Society of Edinburgh. His proposers were James Hartley Ashworth, James Cossar Ewart, Francis Albert Eley Crew and John Stephenson. He won the Society's Keith Prize for the period 1933–35. He then went to McGill University.

In 1927 he became zoology chair at the University of Cape Town. He worked in endocrinology, studying chameleon properties of the Xenopus frog. The frog's adult color depended on its early environment; wild frogs became brownish-green, while frogs raised in a dark environment became black, and in a light environment, light-colored. Hogben theorized that the frog's ability to develop differences in color was related to the pituitary gland. After removing the pituitary gland, the frogs became white regardless of their environment.

The frogs also developed a side effect that Hogben tried to counteract by injecting the frogs with pituitary extract from an ox. He noticed that female Xenopus frogs ovulated within hours of being injected with the extract. In this way, Hogben serendipitously discovered a human pregnancy test. He knew that the ox extract chemically resembled human chorionic gonadotropin (HCG), a hormone released by pregnant women. He confirmed that female Xenopus frogs, when injected with urine from a pregnant woman, ovulated within hours. Hogben found the job in South Africa attractive, but his antipathy to the country's racial policies drove him to leave.

In 1930 Hogben moved to the London School of Economics, in a chair for social biology. There he continued to develop the Hogben Pregnancy Test. Previous pregnancy tests required several days to carry out and resulted in the deaths of mice or rabbits. Hogben's pregnancy test took hours and could be carried out without harm to the frogs, which could be reused for future tests. It became the major, international pregnancy test for about fifteen years, from the mid-1930s through the 1940s.

The social biology position at the London School of Economics was funded by the Rockefeller Foundation, and when it withdrew funding Hogben moved to Aberdeen, becoming Regius Professor of Natural History at the University of Aberdeen in 1937.

During World War II Hogben had responsibility for the British Army's medical statistics. From 1941 to 1947 he was Mason Professor of Zoology at the University of Birmingham and professor of medical statistics there 1947–1961, when he retired. In 1963, he became the first Vice-Chancellor of the University of Guyana, a post he abandoned in April 1964, resigning in 1965.

=== Xenopus pregnancy test controversy ===
Hogben's claim to have discovered the Xenopus pregnancy test was disputed by two South African researchers, Hillel Shapiro and Harry Zwarenstein. Shapiro had been Hogben's student in Cape Town, and he acknowledged that Hogben had suggested that Xenopus was a suitable subject for general research. The pregnancy test itself was discovered by Shapiro and his co-researcher, Harry Zwarenstein, and their results and report had been widely published in medical journals and text books in South Africa and the United Kingdom; in their report published by Royal Society of South Africa in October 1933, Shapiro and Zwarenstein announced that in the previous month they had successfully used Xenopus in 35 pregnancy tests. The following spring Nature carried their report. Shapiro and Zwarenstein's letter published in the British Medical Journal on 16 November 1946 clarified that Hogben was retrospectively wrongly claiming credit for discovering the pregnancy test. Nobel laureate John B. Gurdon of the Wellcome CRC Institute and Nick Hopwood of the Department of History and Philosophy of Science, University of Cambridge, elaborated on this in detail in their comprehensive 2003 article published in The International Journal of Developmental Biology, pointing out that although Hogben had demonstrated in principle that Xenopus might be used for testing the presence of gonadotropins in a pregnant woman's urine, his reporting had not mentioned pregnancy testing at all; he seemed to have had other research directions.

=== Political views ===
While he was Chair for Social Biology at the London School of Economics, Hogben unleashed a relentless attack on the British eugenics movement, which was at its apex in the 1920s and 1930s. In contrast to eugenicists, who commonly drew a strict line between heredity (or nature) and environment (or nurture), Hogben highlighted the 'interdependence of nature and nurture'. Hogben's appeal to this interdependence of nature and nurture marked the first time gene-environment interaction (or 'gene-environment interplay') was used to undermine statistical attempts to partition the contributions of nature and nurture, as well as the eugenic implications drawn from those statistics. Hogben's foil throughout this period was R.A. Fisher, the leading scientist-eugenicist of the day (Tabery 2008).

In a biographical sketch for Twentieth Century Authors, Hogben stated:

I like Scandinavians, skiing, swimming, and socialists who realize that it is our business to promote social progress by peaceful methods. I dislike football, economists, eugenists, Fascists, Stalinists, and Scottish conservatives. I think that sex is necessary and that bankers are not.

=== Popular science writing ===
Inspired by the example of The Outline of History by H. G. Wells, Hogben began to work on books designed to popularize mathematics and science for the general public. Hogben produced two best-selling works of popular science, Mathematics for the Million (1936) and Science for the Citizen (1938). Mathematics for the Million received widespread praise, with H. G. Wells saying that "Mathematics for the Million is a great book, a book of first-class importance". The book was also lauded by Albert Einstein, Bertrand Russell and Julian Huxley. Mathematics for the Million was reprinted after Hogben's death. While at Aberdeen, Hogben developed an interest in language. Besides editing The Loom of Language by his friend Frederick Bodmer, he created an international language, Interglossa, as 'a draft of an auxiliary for a democratic world order'.

George Orwell in his essay Politics and the English Language used a sentence of Hogben's as an example of how not to write, particularly in relation to the use of metaphors.

Above all, we cannot play ducks and drakes with a native battery of idioms which prescribes egregious collocations of vocables (...)

— Orwell (1946), quoting Hogben, Interglossa (1943)

Professor Hogben plays ducks and drakes with a battery which is able to write prescriptions (...)

— Orwell, Politics and the English Language (1946)

== Personal life ==
In 1918 Hogben married the mathematician, statistician, socialist and feminist Enid Charles from Denbigh with whom he had two sons and two daughters. He learned Welsh.

In the 1950s Hogben settled at Glyn Ceiriog in north Wales, where he bought a cottage. That decade his marriage to Enid broke down; the couple separated in 1953 and divorced in 1957. Later that year Hogben married (Mary) Jane Roberts (née Evans), a local widowed retired school headmistress, who was seven years younger. Widowed by the death of Jane in 1974, he died at the War Memorial Hospital at Wrexham in 1975 aged 79 and was cremated at nearby Pentre Bychan. He was an atheist, and defined himself as a "scientific humanist".

== Awards ==
Hogben was awarded the Neill Prize, and a gold medal, for his work in mathematical genetics. In 1936, Hogben became a Fellow of the Royal Society. The citation read:

Distinguished for his work in Experimental Zoology, especially in respect of the mechanism of colour change in Amphibia and Reptilia. He has published a series of important papers on the effect of hormones on the pigmentary effector system and on the reproductive cycle of vertebrates, and has worked on many branches of comparative physiology. More recently he has made substantial contributions to genetics, especially with regard to man.

== Legacy ==
Hogben's research has left a lasting impression on the history of biology. The African clawed frog (Xenopus laevis), which Hogben first developed as a model organism, is now one of the most widely used model organisms in biological research. Likewise, his emphasis on the interdependence of nature and nurture has affected and continues to affect scientific practice and scientific debate. In terms of scientific practice, modern research on phenotypic plasticity, gene-environment interaction, and developmental systems theory all owes much to the legacy of Hogben's initial emphasis on understanding nature and nurture interdependently rather than in dichotomy. In terms of scientific debate, the dispute between Hogben and R.A. Fisher over gene-environment interaction was the first of many subsequent disputes over the extent to which the primacy of the gene can be understood independently of its developmental relationship with the environment. The debate on nature and nurture, the race and intelligence controversy, the heritability wars, concerns over the geneticisation of complex human traits, and arguments over the promises and perils of the Human Genome Project all incorporate some element of disagreement over the primacy of the gene. Hogben's attack on that primacy by appeal to the interdependence of nature and nurture has been echoed in each successive dispute.

=== The Hogben Archive ===
The Lancelot Thomas Hogben papers are held in Special Collections, University of Birmingham. Archive highlights include a draft of his autobiography (later edited and published by his son Adrian Hogben and his wife), correspondence, hand drawn diagrams for his books, and reflections on his life and works. (For a review of the Hogben Archive, see Tabery 2006).

== Works ==
- A Short Life of Alfred Russel Wallace (1823-1913), p. 64 (London, Society for Promoting Christian Knowledge, 1918)
- Exiles of the Snow, and Other Poems (1918)
- An Introduction to Recent Advances in Comparative Physiology (1924) with Frank R. Winton
- The Pigmentary Effector System. A review of the physiology of colour response (1924)
- Comparative Physiology (1926)
- Comparative Physiology of Internal Secretion (1927)
- The Nature of Living Matter (1930)
- Genetic Principles in Medical and Social Science (1931)
- Nature or Nurture - The William Withering Lectures for 1933 (1933)
- Mathematics for the Million: A Popular Self-Educator (London, George Allen & Unwin, 1936), illustrated by Frank Horrabin, Primers for the Age of Plenty - No. 1. Re-issued in the United States by W. W. Norton & Company, Inc. (1937).
- The Retreat from Reason (1936) Conway Memorial Lecture 20 May 1936, chaired by Julian Huxley.
- Science for the Citizen: A Self-Educator Based on the Social Background of Scientific Discovery (London, George Allen & Unwin, 1938), illustrated by Frank Horrabin, Primers for the Age of Plenty - No. 2.
- Political Arithmetic: A Symposium of Population Studies (1938) editor
- Dangerous Thoughts (1939)
- Author in Transit (1940)
- Principles of Animal Biology (1940)
- Interglossa: A Draft of an Auxiliary for a Democratic world order, Being an Attempt to Apply Semantic Principles to Language Design (1943)
- The Loom of Language: A Guide To Foreign Languages For The Home Student by Frederick Bodmer (1944), edited by Hogben, Primers for the Age of Plenty - No. 3.
- An Introduction to Mathematical Genetics (1946)
- History of the Homeland: The Story of the British Background by Henry Hamilton (1947), edited by Hogben, Primers for the Age of Plenty - No. 4.
- The New Authoritarianism (1949) Conway Memorial Lecture 1949
- From Cave Painting To Comic Strip: A Kaleidoscope of Human Communication (1949)
- Chance and Choice by Cardpack and Chessboard (1950)
- Man Must Measure: The Wonderful World of Mathematics (1955)
- Statistical theory. The relationship of probability, credibility and error. An examination of the contemporary crisis in statistical theory from a behaviorist viewpoint (1957)
- The Wonderful World Of Energy (1957)
- The Signs of Civilisation (1959)
- The Wonderful World of Communication (1959)
- Mathematics in the Making (1960)
- Essential World English (1963) with Jane Hogben and Maureen Cartwright
- Science in Authority: Essays (1963)
- The Mother Tongue (1964)
- Whales for the Welsh — A Tale of War and Peace with Notes for those who Teach or Preach (1967)
- Beginnings and Blunders or Before Science Began (1970)
- The Vocabulary Of Science (1970) with Maureen Cartwright
- Astronomer Priest and Ancient Mariner (1972)
- Maps, Mirrors and Mechanics (1973)
- Columbus, the Cannon Ball and the Common Pump (1974)
- How The World Was Explored, editor, with Marie Neurath and Joseph Albert Lauwerys
- Hogben, Anne; Hogben, Lancelot Thomas; Hogben, Adrian. Lancelot Hogben: scientific humanist: an unauthorised autobiography (1998)

== See also ==
- Leslie Hogben, granddaughter of Lancelot
