= Interglossa =

Constructed language

- Created by: Lancelot Hogben
- Date: 1943
- Setting and usage: international auxiliary language
- Purpose: Constructed language: auxiliary language; Interglossa
- Sources: Latin and Greek

Language codes
- ISO 639-3: igs
- Glottolog: inte1261

Interglossa (lit. "between + language") is a constructed language devised by biologist Lancelot Hogben during World War II, as an attempt to put the international lexicon of science and technology, mainly of Greek and Latin origin, into a language with a purely isolating grammar. Interglossa was published in 1943 as just a draft of an auxiliary. Hogben applied semantic principles to provide a reduced vocabulary of just over 880 words which might suffice for basic conversation among peoples of different nationality.

A descendant of Interglossa is Glosa (1970s–), which expanded and made changes to the words of the language.

== History ==
In 1943 Hogben published Interglossa: A draft of an auxiliary for a democratic world order. As a professor, Hogben had seen how hard it was for the students to memorize the terms of biology, as they were poorly acquainted with etymology and the classical languages. So he began to show them the international Greek and Latin roots of these terms to aid their memory. He started to compile a vocabulary, and later, during World War II at Birmingham, he devised some guidelines of syntax, thus completing the draft of a new auxiliary language especially based on the lexicon of modern science:

Because natural science is the only existing form of human co-operation on a planetary scale, men of science, who have to turn to journals published in many languages for necessary information, are acutely aware that the babel of tongues is a social problem of the first magnitude. Men of science, more than others, have at their finger-tips an international vocabulary which is already in existence (...)

— Hogben (1943, p. 7)

Eventually, Hogben became convinced that such an auxiliary language appeared to be more necessary than ever before, so he decided to publish his proposal, insisting that it was simply a draft:

A good enough reason for publishing this draft is that the post-war world may be ripe, as never before, for recognition of need for a remedy which so many others have sought. When need becomes articulate, it will be relatively simple for an international committee (...).
(...) the author modestly consigns this first draft in the hope that readers will make suggestions and offer constructive criticisms as a basis for something better. It is not a primer for the beginner.

— Hogben (1943, p. 7)

Interglossa might be seen as the draft of its descendant auxiliary language Glosa, which has partly changed and expanded the lexicon.

== Alphabet and pronunciation ==
Interglossa has a Latin alphabet using the 26 letters of the ISO basic Latin alphabet without any diacritics.

Capital letters
A	B	C	D	E	F	G	H	I	J	K	L	M	N	O	P	Q	R	S	T	U	V	W	X	Y	Z
Lower case
a	b	c	d	e	f	g	h	i	j	k	l	m	n	o	p	q	r	s	t	u	v	w	x	y	z
IPA phonemes
a	b	k	d	e	f	g	h	i	j	k	l	m	n	o	p	k	r	s	t	u	v	w	ks	i	z

Most letters of the alphabet are pronounced in accordance with the symbols of the international phonetic alphabet, with the following exceptions:

y is equivalent to /i/.
c and q are equivalent to /k/.
ph, th, ch, rh, have respectively the value /f/, /t/, /k/, /r/.
Initial x is /z/, otherwise /ks/.

In the following initial consonant combinations, the first element is silent: ct-, gn-, mn-, pn-, ps-, pt-.

These rules admit of no inconsistencies. The inconvenience of having a few anomalies which go into a dozen lines of print is far less than the disadvantage which would result from mutilating roots beyond visual recognition.

— Hogben (1943, p. 30)

The stress is generally on the penultimate syllable, e.g. billeta (ticket), nesia (island). If the word ends with two vowels (-io, -ia, etc.), these might sound as a diphthong. But Hogben rather keeps a hiatus, stating that the stress in nesia is on the antepenultimate syllable (thus analysed as nE-si-a, not *nE-sia).

== Parts of speech ==
A classification of parts of speech relevant to an isolating language would not follow the categories appropriate to the flexional system of the Indo-European group. The vocables of Interglossa can be classified following the function of individual vocables in the “sentence-landscape” (p. 32-3):

- Substantives (items no. 483 to 860; and no. 874 to 880; additionally no. 881 to 954): Names for concrete things. Any one of them can act as an adjective, as it increasingly happens in English. Examples (from the sample text below): crati (government), geo (earth), pani (bread), parenta (parent), urani (heaven).
  - Parts of the Body (no. 483 to 550)
  - Zoological and Botanical terms (no. 551 to 630)
  - Geographical names (no. 631 to 668)
  - Food, Clothes and Furniture (no. 669 to 702)
  - Architectural terms; Shapes and Units (no. 703 to 732)
  - Instruments (no. 733 to 783)
  - Substances and Manufactured Articles (other than Foods and Clothes) (no. 784 to 808)
  - Human Affairs (no. 809 to 860)
- There is a set of generic substantives (no. 47 to 60) used in compounds. Examples: -pe [from persona] (person), dirigo-pe (driver, pilot), tene-pe (keeper), pan-pe (everybody).
- “Amplifiers” (no. 141 to 462; and no. 862 to 873): Abstract words, anyone of which can take the place of a noun, adjective or corresponding adverb. Examples: accido (happening, real, -ity, etc.), demo (population), dirigo / controlo (direction, control, etc.), dyno (power, -ful, etc.), eu (good, -ness, well, etc.), famo (reputation, fame), eu-famo (good fame, glory, etc.), libero (free, -dom), malo (evil), nomino (name), offero (offer, -ing), pardo (forgiving, forgiveness), revero (reverent, -ence).
  - Some of them do the work of place or time particles (no. 61 to 101). Examples: a(d) (to, toward), apo (away from, etc.), di (day, daily, on (the day...), etc.), epi (on), in (in, inner, etc.), tem (time, while, etc.).
  - Some of them do the work of associative particles with additional meaning as prepositions and/or conjunctions (no. 102 to 128). Examples: causo (cause, because, etc.), de (of, in relation to, etc.), harmono (harmony, according to, etc.), hetero (different, unlike, otherwise, etc.), homo (similar, -ly, like), metro (measure, in so far as, etc.), plus (addition, -al, in addition, and, etc.), tendo (aim, will, in order to, etc.).
  - Some of them do the work of auxiliary verbs (no. 129 to 140). Example: volo (willing, wish, wish to, want to, would like to).
- “Verboids” (no. 463 to 482): Names of processes and states. Examples: acte (do, act, etc.), date (give, etc.), dicte (say, express, etc.), gene (get, etc.), habe (have, etc.), tene (keep, etc.). They may not act like a verb, e.g.: plu malo acte (the evil acts, the sins).
  - They may form natural combinations with abstract words, analogous to such Basic English constructions. Examples: acte dirigo (direct, control, etc.), acte malo (do evil, sin, trespass), acte pardo (forgive), date libero (give freedom, free), dicte petitio (say a request, request), dicte volo (wish, etc.), habe accido (happen, etc.).
- “Pseudonyms” (no. 1 to 11): They function both as pronouns and as equivalents for nouns or for corresponding adjectives. Examples: na (we, us, our), mu (they, those, etc. (multitude)), su (who... (relative pronoun when subject)), tu (thou, thee, thy, you, your).
- Interrogative, Imperative, Negative and Comparative Particles (no. 41 to 46), two of which allow for question, request or command without deviation from the invariant word-pattern. Examples: no(n) (not, no!), peti (request). While peti is a brief way to express the polite imperative, dicte petitio would be the whole expression.
  - In the sample text below, the expression dicte volo may be equivalent to the English subjunctive: Na dicte volo; tu Nomino gene revero : hallowed be thy name.
- Articles (no. 12 to 40): General words and numerals which have the function of predicating plurality or otherwise in relation to noun-equivalents (all of which are invariant like English sheep). Examples: pan (all), plu (some, a number of, the), u(n) (a(n), any, the).

== “Sentence-landscape” ==
For ready recognition, a language free of flexions can benefit from two types of signposts of “sentence-landscape”: articles (see “Parts of Speech”), and terminals (that is, final vowels):

- Substantives end in -a or -i. (Exceptions are: geo, cardo, acu, occlu, bureau, computo).
- ”Amplifiers” end in -o. (Exceptions are: anni, di, hora, post, pre, tem, ad, contra, epi, ex, extra, in, inter, para, littora, peri, tele, trans, anti, de, minus, per, plus, syn, vice).
- “Verboids” end in -e.
- “Pseudonyms”, otherwise, end in no particular terminal: mi, tu, na, an[dro], fe[mina], re, pe[rsona], mu[lti], auto, recipro, su[bject].

Hogben prefers to have this number of exceptions instead of the disadvantage of mutilating a familiar international stem or of unduly lengthening the word. (p. 37)

== Syntax ==
Interglossa is a purely isolating language like Chinese, not depending on suffixes, neither flexional nor derivational, yet it uses a kind of composites whose second component is a monosyllabic noun. Like in Chinese (and English), composite nouns are essential, and so is the context. According to Hogben, such composite nouns may be self-explicit while we take into account its common context of use (p. 21).

Interglossa provides a minimal grammar with a series of syntactic rules, yet differing from the usual grammar of inflexional-agglutinative languages like the Indo-European ones:

Inevitably, we find our-selves gravitating away from the grammatical pattern of the Aryan [Indo-European] family to a more universal idiom with features common to Chinese. The result is that learning a language so designed is a lively training in clear thinking of a kind which anyone can usefully undertake. In fact, the grammar of Interglossa, as is largely true of Basic English, is semantics.

— Hogben (1943, p. 24)

== Lexicon ==
Unlike other auxiliary languages, Hogben's Interglossa tends to adopt the international words from Greek, on account of the intense infiltration of Greek roots into everyday life, which come from modern science and technology. For instance: microbe, microphone, telephone, etc. (p. 30). Even so, a great part of the lexicon is of Latin origin. The term Inter-glossa itself is composed of the Latin inter and the Greek glossa. At times Hogben wavers between Greek and Latin, and suggests pairs of equivalent synonyms (e.g. hypo and infra, soma and corpora), for an eventual international committee to decide between them.

Mass observation on the basis of questionnaires sent out to different groups of people of different nationalities would settle which words in each pigeon-hole are entitled to first-rank.

— Hogben (1943, p.15-16)

In 1943 Hogben announced the preparation of an additional volume, A short English-Interglossa Dictionary. It seems that this volume was not in fact published. Its manuscript is kept among Hogben's papers at the University of Birmingham, and was put online in 2014.

== Sample text ==
The following is the Lord's Prayer, in Interglossa “U Petitio de Christi” (p. 242):

Interglossa version:	Text in Greek:	English version (with final doxology):
Na Parenta in Urani: Na dicte volo; tu Nomino gene revero; plus tu Crati habe accido; plus u Demo acte harmono tu Tendo epi Geo homo in Urani; Na dicte petitio: Tu date plu di Pani a Na; plus Tu acte pardo plu malo Acte de Na; metro Na acte pardo Mu; Su acte malo de Na. Peti Tu non acte dirigo Na a plu malo Offero; Hetero, Tu date libero Na apo Malo. Causo Tu tene u Crati plus u Dyno plus un eu Famo pan Tem. Amen.	Πάτερ ημών ο εν τοις ουρανοίς, αγιασθήτω το όνομά Σου, ελθέτω η Βασιλεία σου, γενηθήτω το θέλημά σου ως εν ουρανώ και επί της γης. Τον άρτον ημών τον επιούσιον δος ημίν σήμερον, και άφες ημίν τα οφειλήματα ημών, ως και ημείς αφίεμεν τοις οφειλέταις ημών. Και μη εισενέγκης ημάς εις πειρασμόν, αλλά ρύσαι ημάς από του πονηρού. Ότι σου εστί η βασιλεία και η δύναμις και η δόξα εις τους αιώνας. Αμήν.	Our Father who art in heaven, hallowed be thy name. Thy kingdom come. Thy will be done, on earth as it is in heaven. Give us this day our daily bread, and forgive us our trespasses, as we forgive those who trespass against us, and lead us not into temptation, but deliver us from evil. For thine is the kingdom, and the power, and the glory, for ever and ever. Amen.

== Word-list ==
Hogben provides a numbered list of 880 words with etymologic clues.(pp. 256–82) Some of the items (about 100) are pairs of synonyms, for example: dirigo / controlo (item no. 185).
Hogben also provides an additional list of 74 international words, so actually there would be a lexicon of 954.
Hogben finally provides an alphabetical list (pp. 249–56), which unfortunately has frequent mistakes in the item numbers (here corrected).
Syllables in bold type are "generic substantives" used in compound words.

Item no.	Word
483	abdomini
551	acantha
141	accido
784	acidi
463	acouste
142	acro
464	acte
143	activo
733	acu
144	acuto
076	a(d)
180	adapto
145	adhesio
146	aero
147	aetio
809	agenda
455	aggresso
631	agri
148	algo
149	alieno
102	allo
633	alluvia
150	alto
151	amico
703	amorphi
669	ampulla
552	amygda
670	amyla
004	an
553	ana
152	anemo
175	angio
061	anni
554	anseri
077	antero
785	anthraci
103	anti
810	anthropi
556	api
078	apo
734	ara
274	arbitro
153	archo
786	argenta
811	arma
329	aromo
154	arrogo
484	arthri
812	arti
735	artilleri
669	asci
556	asini
772	aspi
155	assuro
633	astra
634	asyla
704	atria
156	attendo
334	attitudo
463	audie
787	aura
153	authorito
009	auto
557	avi
736	axi
737	baci
635	baia
705	balconi
465	balle
813	banca
157	baro
158	baso
159	batho
028	bi
814	bibli
160	bibo
815	billeta
161	bio
738	blada
162	blasto
739	bomba
079	boreo
558	bovi
485	brachi
163	bronto
558	brya
486	bucca
560	bulba
816	bureau
671	bursa
672	butyri
673	caca
674	cafa
487	calca
196	callo
675	calyci
861	cambio
561	cameli
047	**ca**meri
676	campani
562	canabi
636	canali
563	canceri
564	cani
488	cantha
164	canto
460	capacito
546	capilla
817	capitali
818	capitula
819	capsa
165	captivo
788	carba
489	cardia
740	cardo
565	cari
682	carni
566	carpa
490	carpi
637	carta
874	cartoni
617	casea
166	catalyso
741	catena
548	cauda
567	caula
104	causo
167	cavito
168	celebro
169	celero
037	centi
706	centra
491	cephali
707	cera
492	cerebra
168	ceremonio
170	certifo
155	certo
568	cervi
492	cervica
862	charito
494	chiri
171	chloro
678	choani
172	cholo
495	chondra
173	choro
820	christi
174	chromo
062	chron
569	chyma
863	cido
789	cigara
790	cigaretta
570	citra
821	classi
175	claustro
742	clavi
743	cleidi
105	cleisto
176	clepto
638	clima
679	clinica
177	clino
571	cochlea
572	cocoa
167	coelo
178	cogito
179	coito
744	colea
791	colla
822	coloni
708	columni
180	comico
823	commisari
824	commita
181	communo
825	compani
106	comparo
182	competo
839	computo
864	concessio
530	concha
107	conditio
680	confecti
183	confessio
871	confusio
108	congruo
709	coni
573	coniferi
184	consolo
639	continenti
080	contra
185	controlo
745	copa
505	copra
746	copula
514	cornua
681	corona
541	corpora
875	corpuscula
747	coryna
640	cosmi
496	costa
534	coxa
497	crania
826	crati
682	crea
186	credito
187	credo
792	creta
188	critico
710	cruci
189	cryo
190	crypto
793	crystali
748	cteni
711	Cuba
574	cucurbi
191	culino
192	culto
794	cupra
193	curo
206	curso
194	curvo
195	cyano
712	cycli
575	cygni
713	cylindri
498	cysti
499	cyti
500	dactyli
827	data
466	date
109	de
129	debito
036	deca
196	decoro
197	defecto
198	demo
199	demonstro
576	dendra
501	denti
749	dentili
501	dermi
641	deserta
200	desicco
467	detecte
642	detriti
081	dextro
063	di
468	dicte
353	dieto
865	diffusio
110	digito
297	diluto
185	dirigo
750	disca
828	discipuli
201	disputo
202	dissipo
203	divino
204	diviso
048	**do**mi
097	dorsi
205	dramo
206	dromo
207	duco
064	duro
208	dyno
551	echini
209	eco
084	ecto
751	elasti
210	electio
211	electro
212	elemento
577	elepha
503	entera
065	eo
082	epi
213	equatio
469	eque
578	equi
214	ergo
518	eri
215	erro
216	erythro
130	espero
217	espio
470	esthe
158	evido
218	eu
083	e(x)
219	examino
220	excesso
221	expecto
219	experimento
222	experto
163	explosio
084	extra
579	faba
223	fabrico
504	facia
224	facilo
471	facte
752	falci
829	famili
225	famo
315	fantaso
643	farina
049	**fa**scio
226	fatigo
005	fe
505	feci
580	feli
714	fenestra
227	fero
795	ferra
228	fertilo
050	fi
622	fici
830	fili
581	filici
229	fino
230	fisco
231	fissuro
232	fixo
233	flagello
234	flavoro
866	flexio
582	flora
644	fonta
867	foramino
715	forma
583	formici
831	formula
235	forto
236	fortuno
716	fossa
237	fracto
238	frequo
239	frictio
240	frigo
241	frustro
242	fugo
243	fumo
111	functio
753	furca
584	galli
244	gameo
796	gasi
506	gastri
832	gazeta
472	ge
162	gemmo
473	**ge**ne
245	geneto
018	geno
683	geli
645	geo
876	glacia
754	gladi
507	glandi
246	glauco
508	glena
509	glossa
247	gluco
585	gluma
510	glutea
664	glypha
511	gnatha
248	gono
586	gossypi
249	grado
716	grami
587	gramini
833	gramma
250	grapho
251	gratio
252	gravito
253	gravo
254	grego
834	gyna
255	gyro
474	habe
512	haema
256	hagio
797	hali
212	haplo
588	harengi
112	harmono
131	hedo
207	hegemo
646	heli
755	helica
257	helico
626	helminthi
258	helo
040	hemi
513	hepa
033	hepta
066	hespero
259	hetero
032	hexa
260	historo
021	holo
589	homari
590	homini
113	homo
067	hora
591	hordea
261	horizo
647	horti
262	humano
263	hydro
085	hypo
178	ideo
868	idio
264	immuno
265	impacto
836	imperia
266	impero
086	in
756	inci
110	indico
837	industri
835	infanti
267	inflatio
085	infra
268	inhibito
051	inst**ru**menti
269	insuro
087	inter
270	investo
271	iodeo
172	iro
044	iso
272	itero
273	itinero
832	journali
274	judico
275	juro
514	kerati
038	kilo
475	kine
515	labi
516	lacrima
517	lacti
088	laevo
757	lamina
717	lampa
518	lana
758	lancea
276	lapso
089	latero
592	latici
396	latrio
277	laudo
278	lavo
279	lecto
280	lego
593	legumi
594	lepi
519	lepidi
281	leuco
331	liabilo
282	liberalo
283	libero
284	libido
285	ligato
286	limito
648	limni
595	lina
287	lineo
520	lipi
288	liquo
052	**li**thi
718	litri
090	littora
053	**lo**co
289	logo
290	longo
521	lophi
166	lubrico
878	luciferi
291	luco
649	luna
596	lupi
292	luteo
759	lyra
293	lyso
760	machina
294	magico
295	magneto
045	major
761	mallea
296	malo
297	mano
798	margara
650	mari
684	marsupia
869	massago
298	masso
054	**ma**teria
299	maturo
055	**me**chani
022	mega
300	melano
308	memo
068	mensi
301	merco
091	meridio
019	mero
092	meso
799	metali
638	meteori
302	methodo
719	metri
114	metro
001	mi
023	micro
303	milito
039	million
762	mimi
651	mina
069	mini
304	ministro
046	minor
115	minus
305	miro
306	miso
763	missili
685	mitra
307	mixo
308	mnemo
056	**mo**bili
309	monito
027	mono
652	monti
310	mordo
132	moro
311	morpho
312	morto
476	mote
008	mu
653	muci
720	mura
597	muri
838	musea
313	musico
314	muto
539	mya
039	myria
315	mytho
003	na
316	narco
522	nari
523	nasa
317	natio
318	nato
764	navi
655	nebuli
319	necro
133	necesso
870	necto
320	negotio
321	neo
656	nepheli
524	nephri
655	nesia
525	neura
623	nicoti
070	nocti
322	nocuo
323	nomino
324	nomo
043	no(n)
035	nonnea
325	normo
839	nota
326	nullo
327	numero
071	nu(n)
328	occasio
093	occidento
765	occlu
657	oceani
034	octa
526	oculi
329	odoro
527	oesophagi
330	offero
686	olea
014	oligo
331	onero
332	oppresso
528	ora
596	orangi
333	ordino
877	organa
334	orientatio
094	oriento
335	orno
336	ortho
453	oscillo
337	osculo
529	ostea
530	ostraca
531	oti
532	ova
721	ovali
599	ovi
338	oxidatio
144	oxyo
339	pachyo
340	paco
341	paleo
699	pallia
015	pan
687	pani
600	panica
342	papillo
800	papyri
095	para
343	parallelo
344	paralyso
345	parasito
346	pardo
840	parenta
254	partio
347	patho
748	pectini
348	pecunio
533	pedi
349	pedio
766	peleci
534	pelvi
116	pendo
350	penito
767	penna
351	peno
031	penta
117	per
477	perde
383	perforato
096	peri
134	permito
871	perplexo
332	persecuto
601	persica
007	**pe**rsona
041	**peti**tio
801	petrolea
352	phaeo
353	phago
354	phanero
135	pheno
355	philo
878	phlogista
356	phobo
602	phoeni
357	phono
358	phoro
359	photo
658	phrea
360	phreno
603	phylla
361	physio
604	phyta
362	picto
535	pinna
605	pisa
606	pisci
768	pista
688	placa
363	plano
802	plasti
364	plato
365	pleno
366	plico
013	plu
803	plumba
118	plus
367	pluto
368	pluvio
369	pneumo
536	poda
841	poeti
246	polio
842	politica
843	polizi
016	poly
607	pomi
721	ponti
722	porta
136	posso
072	post
844	posta
119	postulo
659	potami
608	potati
137	poto
370	praxo
073	pre
371	premio
138	preparo
723	prisma
372	privilegio
102	pro
373	producto
374	profito
342	projectio
845	proletari
375	promisso
846	propaganda
376	proposo
847	propria
848	prosa
724	prosceni
377	prospecto
378	protesto
139	proto
121	proximi
609	pruni
661	psamma
379	pseudo
537	pteri
380	publico
381	pudo
538	pulmoni
689	pulvini
382	puro
510	pygea
383	pylo
725	pyrami
610	pyri
384	pyro
726	quadra
385	qualito
042	**que**stio
326	quito
024	quo
386	radio
611	rami
387	rapo
388	raso
389	ratio
006	re
478	reacte
414	recepto
727	recessi
010	recipro
390	recto
391	reflecto
849	regi
392	religio
524	rena
850	rentieri
393	reparo
209	resido
394	residuo
395	resisto
369	respiro
396	revero
769	reti
097	retro
612	rhabdi
397	rheo
613	rhiza
398	rhodo
399	rigo
400	riso
168	rituo
770	rota
051	ru
401	rugo
660	rura
690	sacari
671	sacci
841	sacramenta
256	sacro
402	sado
771	sagitta
614	salmi
403	salto
404	saluto
405	sano
406	sapio
804	saponi
407	sapro
539	sarca
615	sardini
025	satio
728	scala
540	scapa
408	schizo
409	scholo
852	scientia
410	sclero
411	scopo
772	scuta
616	secala
074	seci
853	secretari
412	secto
691	sedi
617	selachi
413	semao
414	sensitivo
805	sepia
440	sepso
720	septa
122	sequo
415	serio
258	servo
773	seta
416	severo
854	sibi
774	signa
417	significo
661	sili
618	simi
017	singulo
418	siphono
715	skeleta
419	societo
420	solemno
428	solido
020	solo
421	solutio
541	soma
423	somno
422	sopho
423	soporo
775	spatula
424	specio
662	spectra
619	sperma
776	sphena
730	sphera
879	sphinctra
692	spiriti
257	spiro
425	sporto
232	stabilo
426	stalagmo
806	stanna
777	stapi
427	stato
520	stea
428	stereo
429	stigmo
479	stimule
528	stoma
693	strata
430	strategico
011	su
620	suberi
542	sudori
621	sui
807	sulphi
431	summatio
694	supa
098	supero
622	syca
432	sympto
123	syn
778	syringi
433	systemo
623	tabaca
124	tacto
388	talo
695	tapea
156	tardo
543	tarsi
779	taxi
696	tea
222	techno
731	tecti
099	tele
855	telefon
856	telegram
075	tem
126	tendo
480	tene
434	tensio
140	tentato
663	terra
697	testa
435	testimonio
030	tetra
057	**te**xti
305	thaumo
698	theca
544	thela
857	thema
436	theo
437	thermo
545	thoraci
699	toga
438	tolero
624	tomati
439	tono
100	topo
440	toxo
481	tracte
101	trans
700	trapeza
441	traumo
749	trepana
029	tri
546	tricha
625	tritica
442	tropo
002	tu
732	tubi
701	tunica
664	tunneli
443	turbo
780	tympana
444	typo
099	ultra
445	umbro
012	un
547	ungua
446	uniformo
447	unio
880	unita
858	universita
872	universo
548	ura
665	urani
666	urba
549	urini
550	uteri
873	utilo
448	vacuo
781	vagoni
667	valli
449	valo
859	valuta
450	vaporo
314	vario
058	**va**sa
782	vecti
783	vela
169	veloco
451	vendo
860	verba
452	verito
626	vermi
126	verso
627	vespi
059	**ve**sto
668	via
453	vibro
127	vice
454	victo
544	villi
702	vini
455	violo
456	viro
482	vise
457	visito
628	viti
808	vitri
458	vivo
459	voco
128	volo
460	volumo
461	vulno
629	vulpi
292	xantho
149	xeno
026	zero
630	zoa
060	**zo**na
462	zygo
881*	acarina
882*	alfalfa
883*	alga
884*	alkali
885*	Anguilla
886*	anura
887*	anus
888*	araneida
889*	area
890*	arteria
891*	avena
892*	bacteria
893*	banana
894*	betula
895*	branchia
896*	brassica
897*	camera
898*	capra
899*	carina
900*	cetacea
901*	chela
902*	chelonia
903*	coleoptera
904*	corolla
905*	coryza
906*	crocodilia
907*	diptera
908*	dyspepsia
909*	embryo
910*	erica
911*	fungi
912*	gemini
913*	inertia
914*	insecta
915*	lacertilia
916*	lactuca
917*	larva
918*	lens
919*	leo
920*	lepidoptera
921*	libra
922*	mamma
923*	manifesto
924*	maxima
925*	mica
926*	minima
927*	nausea
928*	ophidia
929*	oryza
930*	ostrea
931*	pediculina
932*	pelecypoda
933*	piano
934*	picea
935*	porifera
936*	protesta
937*	pterygia
938*	pyrexia
939*	reptilia
940*	sago
941*	saliva
942*	scorpionida
943*	sex
944*	silica
945*	siphanaptera
946*	soya
947*	trachea
948*	ursa
949*	vena
950*	vertebra
951*	violin
952*	virgo
953*	viscera
954*	zea
