= Glosa =

International auxiliary language

- Glosa
- Created by: Ronald Clark and Wendy Ashby, based on the Interglossa of Lancelot Hogben
- Date: 1972–1992
- Setting and usage: international auxiliary language
- Purpose: Constructed language: auxiliary language; Glosa
- Sources: Interglossa

Language codes
- ISO 639-3: None (mis)
- Glottolog: None
- IETF: art-x-glosa

Glosa is a constructed international auxiliary language based on Interglossa (a previous draft of an auxiliary published in 1943). The first Glosa dictionary was published 1978. The name of the language comes from the Greek root glossa meaning tongue or language.

Glosa is an isolating language, which means that words never change form, and Glosa spelling is also completely regular and phonetic. As an isolating language, there are no inflections, so that words always remain in their dictionary form, no matter what function they have in the sentence. Consequently, grammatical functions, when not clear from the context, are taken over by a small number of operator words and by the use of word order (syntax). Being an a posteriori language, Glosa takes most of its vocabulary from Greek and Latin roots, seen by the authors as international in a sense by their usage in science.

== History ==
Glosa is based on the draft auxiliary language Interglossa devised by the scientist Lancelot Hogben in the empty hours of fire-watching in Aberdeen during World War II. Interglossa was published in 1943 as a draft of an auxiliary.

Ron Clark came across the handbook of Interglossa: a draft of an auxiliary at about 1960. Then he met Professor Hogben with the aim of developing the language. They worked to refine it, in order to make it more easily usable in all possible forms of communication. Wendy Ashby joined the project in 1972. When Hogben died in 1975, most changes had already been discussed. Hogben and Clark had agreed that the language should have a phonetic spelling (that is: each letter representing a single sound). This principle implied that the Greek CH, TH and PH now should be spelt K, T and F.

Finally a few further changes were introduced by Ron Clark and Wendy Ashby, who then gave the language the new name Glosa (from the Greek word for tongue, language – “glossa” being the English transliteration), and thus founded a new auxiliary language.

Until about 1979, Ashby and Clark tested the use of Glosa using local volunteers in the town in which they were living. During this period, the vocabulary and some details of sentence formation were developed and revised. They had moved to another town by the time they had published the first Glosa dictionary.

From 1987, the charity-status organisation GEO (Glosa Education Organisation) has promoted the teaching of Glosa as a second language in schools worldwide.

GEO's official website was set up by Paul O. Bartlett in 1996, and it is managed at present by Marcel Springer. It provides the Glosa Internet Dictionary (Glosa Inter-reti Diktionaria), as well as an introductory course, and other resources. A Wiki in Glosa was created in 2021. In January 2025, a new online magazine, called U Glosa jurnali, was published in Glosa. In March 2025, a YouTube channel called Mi Simpli Bio ("My Simple Life") started uploading short videos in Glosa. On 6 November 2025, the Glosa community decided to move the encyclopedic articles from Glosa Wiki from Fandom to Incubator Plus 2.0. On 10th November 2025, a new wiki, called Glosa Biblioteka ("Glosa library") was created to gather just literary texts in Glosa

=== Unclear history ===
According to History behind Glosa, after Hogben's death “a few further and trivial changes were introduced”. But there is no precise information about them, so it's not clear exactly which changes were made by Hogben and Clark, and which were made by Clark and Ashby.

== Overview ==
In Glosa, words always retain their original form, regardless of their function in a sentence. Thus, the same word can function as a verb, noun, adjective or preposition. Glosa is thereby a completely analytic language: there are no inflections for noun plurals, verb tenses, genders, and so on – the words never change.

Grammatical functions are taken over by a limited number of operator words and by the word order (syntax). Subject–verb–object order is the standard word order, and "adjectives" usually precede "nouns", and the "verbs" follow the tense particles and the "adverbs".

Glosa is usually compared to two natural languages which are analytical in different degrees, Chinese and English. It is also similar to the auxiliary Lingua sistemfrater, also known as Frater, published in 1957 by the Vietnamese Phạm Xuân Thái. Frater is also isolating, has a similar vocabulary base, but a slightly different syntactical structure, and has no articles – where Glosa uses u/un for both “the” and “a”/“an”, or gendered pronouns.

Glosa is written with the Latin alphabet without special characters. There are no double vowels or consonants and pronunciation rules are simple and regular.

Most words in Glosa are taken from Latin and Greek roots. Glosa is thus an a posteriori language.

While aspects of Hogben's Interglossa were explicitly inspired by the auxiliary Basic English, Glosa tends to work like normal English. Interglossa works with a small number of essential light verbs (up to 20), which Hogben calls “verboids” or “verbal operators”, like the 18 verb operators of Basic English. In Glosa words from this special class can be elided if the context is clear.

== Spelling and pronunciation ==
Glosa spelling is completely regular and phonetic: one spelling always represents one sound, and one sound is always represented by one spelling. With the sole exception of SC which represents the sound ʃ (as “sh” in short), every letter just represents one sound, and vice versa. Glosa is written with the Latin letters. The alphabet consists of the following letters (and digraph), and their upper case equivalents:

Glosa alphabet (and the digraph sc)
Letter	a	b	c	d	e	f	g	h	i	j	k	l	m	n	o	p	q	r	s	t	u	v	w	x	z	(sc)
IPA phoneme	a	b	t͡ʃ	d	e	f	g	h	i	j	k	l	m	n	o	p	kw	r	s	t	u	v	w	ks	z	ʃ

Unlike several other auxiliary languages, Glosa uses the letters Q and X. C makes the “ch” sound in church. The “sh” sound in short is represented by the letter combination SC – the only digraph. As in many languages, J makes the “y”-sound found in yell or yak. G and S are always "hard" (goat and, respectively, hiss and snake). R should be trilled or "tapped" (the tongue lightly taps the palate of one's mouth), never uvularized.

The practice of pronouncing N before a velar sound (g or k) as ŋ is generally non-preferred but is used commonly in order to simplify pronunciation. X may be pronounced z at the start of a word but this is non-preferred.

Some foreign names may include non-Glosa letters in order to retain original spelling.

=== Vowels ===
The first pronunciation is the preferred one:

a – /a/ or /æ/
o – /ɔ/ or /o/
e – /e/ or /ɛ/
u – /u/ or /ʌ/
i – /i/ or /ɪ/

There are no diphthongs in Glosa. Where two or more vowels occur together, they are pronounced separately.

=== Stress ===
The stress or accent should be placed gently on the vowel before the last consonant.

== Word classes ==
Glosa contains two major groups of words:

=== Primitives ===
Primitives are the small number of basic function words present in most languages—these allow us to describe the relationships between the major concepts we convey. These are basically prepositions and conjunctions, such as: de [of], e [and], pre [before], supra [above], sub [under; below; lower; beneath; lesser; somewhat].

=== Substantives ===
Substantives here are the group of words that represents the more complex things, actions and descriptions (sometimes usable for all three) present in a language, such as: via [road], kurso [run], hedo [happy], vide [see], celera [swift], tako [fast; quick; swift; brisk; hasty; prompt; hurry; nimble; rapid; rapidity; rate; speed; haste; sprint; quick; speedy; velocity]; oku [eye]. Please note that many of these words have multiple meanings, based on how they are used in a sentence (verb, adjective, etc.), exempli gratia: "oku" can mean "eye", "optical", "to notice with the eyes", "see (look)", "perceive (with the eyes)", or "to peep".

== Phrases and clauses ==
Phrases, the basic unit of recognizable meaning in Glosa, follow a Subject–Verb–(Object) order and noun phrases are "substantive final", which means that they start with the least important word, and are followed by additional words combining progressively to extend the meaning of the substantive, which comes last.

== Parts of speech ==
Glosa words can often serve as more than one part of speech. Thus part of speech is a role that the word plays in a sentence, not a tightly-bound property of a word.

=== Personal pronouns ===
Personal Pronouns
Person	English	Glosa	English	Glosa
1	I, me	mi	we, us	na
2	you (s.)	tu	you (pl.)	vi
3	she, her	fe	they, them	mu
3	he, him	an	they, them	mu
3	it	id	they, them	mu
3	he/she/one	pe	they, them	mu

Glosa, unlike English, distinguishes between "you" about one person, which is tu, and about several people, which is vi.

The reflexive pronoun ”oneself” is se, the reciprocal pronoun alelo means ”each other”, and the emphatic auto is used for “self, own“.

=== Verbs ===
Most words can act as verbs, depending on their places in the sentence (usually in the medial position).

Example of Verb Tenses
Tense	Prior Word	Glosa Text	English Translation
Infinitive	-	Mi volu lekto u bibli.	I want to read the book.
Simple Past	pa	Mi pa lekto u bibli.	I (did) read the book.
Imperfect	pa du	Mi pa du lekto u bibli.	I was reading the book.
Past Participle	ge-	U ge-lekto bibli	The read book / The book that has been read
Simple Present	(nu)	Mi (nu) lekto u bibli.	I (do) read the book / I am reading the book.
Continuous Present	du	Mi du lekto u bibli.	I am reading the book.
Present Perfect	nu pa	Mi nu pa lekto u bibli.	I have (just) read the book.
Future-in-Present	nu fu	Mi nu fu lekto u bibli.	I am just about to read the book / I am just going to read the book.
Future-in-Past	pa fu	Mi pa fu lekto u bibli.	I was about to read the book / I was going to read the book.
Simple Future	fu	Mi fu lekto u bibli.	I shall/will read the book.
Future Perfect	fu pa	Mi fu pa lekto u bibli.	I shall/will have read the book (by tomorrow).
Conditional	sio	Mi sio lekto u bibli...	I would read the book...
Imperative	-!	Lekto!	Read!
Negative	ne	Mi ne lekto u bibli.	I do not read the book/I am not reading the book.
Interrogative	qe	Qe mi lekto u bibli?	Am I reading the book? / Do I read the book?
Passive	gene	U bibli gene lekto ex mi.	The book is/gets read by me.
Gerund	-	(U) lekto (de bibli).	(The) reading (of the book...)

"Prior word" here means a word used immediately prior to the verb of the sentence or clause in order to demonstrate or affect its tense. For example:

- To show that a verb is in the past tense, add pa before the verb.
- To indicate the future tense, add fu before the verb.
- To indicate the conditional, add sio before the verb.

=== Adjectives ===
Adjectives, like the rest of the language, are not inflected. They do not change to fit the tense, number, gender, formality, or etc. of the nouns that they modify. They generally precede the word that they modify. Sometimes an adjective's place determines its meaning:

- Mi fu lekto mo bibli – I will read one book
- Mi fu lekto bibli mo – I will read the first book

To create "opposites", one just places "no-" as a prefix to the adjective. This usage is similar to that of the prefix "mal-" in Esperanto which gives the word the exact opposite meaning. So the Glosa usage below means "not beautiful". It is the equivalent of some of the uses on in- or un- in English.

- kali – beautiful
- no-kali – ugly
- termo – hot, heat
- meso-termo – warm
- no-termo – cold

=== Conjunctions ===
- akorda-co – accordingly
- alo – or
- alo...alo – either...or
- alora – in that case...
- anti-co – however
- e – and
- fini-co – finally
- hetero-co – otherwise
- jam – already
- kaso – case...
- ko-co – also
- klu – even...
- ni....ni – neither...nor
- pene – almost
- po-co – after that
- posi – perhaps
- plus-co – moreover
- qasi – as if...
- sed – but
- si ne... – unless
- vice – instead of...

=== Question and answer words ===
Words used to ask or answer a question of who, where, what, when, why, how or how much. These words form a set in a semi-systematic manner with a particle of the compound indicating abstract quantity (what person or thing, what place, what time, for what reason, in what manner, what is the amount) and the prefix/other particle indicating the specific function of the word (exactly which, all, some, negating, etc.).

Here are some examples. There are other ways to say the following correlatives, the table just shows the most basic and systematic of these:

	Question (what)	Indefinite (some)	Very indefinite (any)	Universal (every)	Negative (no)
	qo–	uno–	ali–	panto–	nuli–
–ra (thing)	qo-ra? (what thing?)	uno-ra (something)	ali-ra (anything)	panto-ra (everything)	nuli-ra (nothing)
–pe (individual)	qo-pe? (who?)	uno-pe (someone)	ali-pe (anyone)	panto-pe (everyone; all)	nuli-pe (no one)
Individual	qo? (what [horse]? which [horse]?)	uno (some [horse])	ali (any [horse])	panto (every [horse])	nuli, zero (no [horse])
–lo (place)	qo-lo? (where)	uno-lo (somewhere)	ali-lo (anywhere)	panto-lo (everywhere)	nuli-lo (nowhere)
–mode (manner)	qo-mode?, komo? (how, in what way)	uno-mode (somehow)	ali-mode (in any way)	panto-mode (in every way)	nuli-mode (in no way, no-how)
–ka (cause)	qo-ka? (why; for what cause)	uno-ka (for some cause)	ali-ka (for any cause)	panto-ka (for all causes)	nuli-ka (for no cause)
–te (intention)	qo-te? (why; with what intention)	uno-te (with some intention)	ali-te (with any intention)	panto-te (with all intentions)	nuli-te (with no intention)
–metri (quantity)	qo-metri?, qanto? (how much)	uno-metri (some)	ali-metri (any)	panto-metri (all)	nuli-metri (none)

In addition to the above, there is the prefix/beginning singu- (each), and the suffixes/endings -numera (amount/number), -speci (quality/kind of) and -kron (time), which can be used in the same way as the above.

Qo horo? can also be used for “What time?” or “What is the time?”.

==== Demonstratives ====
The basic demonstratives used for indication (this, that, etc.) are:

- ci, here
- u-ci, this, this one, this [X]
- plu-ci, these
- la, there
- u-la, that, that one, that [X]
- plu-la, those

The demonstratives can also be used in the same way as the words in the table above: u-ci mode, u-la mode (thus; in this way, in that way), u-ci ka, u-la ka (for this cause, for that cause), u-ci te (with this intention), etc.

For “this time”, there's also nu (now), and for “that much/that many”, you can say tanto; for “that kind” talo.

To change a statement into an interrogative, qe is placed at the beginning of the sentence.

=== Prepositions ===
The prepositions of Glosa are here presented with their English translations, and with English example words containing cognates or the same roots in parentheses, with the corresponding part italicized.

- ab – away from (abduct)
- ad – to / towards (advance)
- ana – up (anabolic)
- anti – against (antibiotic)
- de – of / about / pertaining to (describe)
- dextro – (on the) right (ambidextrous)
- dia – through (diagonal)
- epi – on (epicentre)
- ex – out (of) / by (agent) (exterior)
- infra – below / under / lesser (infrared, inferior)
- intra – inside (intracloud)
- kata – down (catastrophe)
- ko – with (coöperate)
- kontra – counter / opposite (counter, contrast)
- laevo – left (levorotation)
- margina – edge / side (margin)
- meso – middle (Mesopotamia)
- minus – without / lacking (minus)
- para – beside (parallel)
- per – by (instrumental) (per)
- peri – around (pericarp)
- po – after (post scriptum)
- pre – before (previous)
- pro – for (pro or con)
- proxi – near (proximity)
- supra – over / above (supranational)
- te – in order to... (tendency)
- tem – for a period of time (temporary)
- tele – far (telephone)
- to(po) – at place (topology)
- trans – across (transition)
- ultra – beyond (ultrasophisticated)
- vice – instead of (vice-president)

=== Numbers ===
The numbers from 0–10 are: ze, mo, bi, tri, tet, pen, six, seti, ok, nona, deka. For 0, 4, 5, 7 and 8 (ze, tet, pen, seti, ok), there's also the longer forms zero, tetra, penta, septi and okto. Higher numbers are formed by combining the numerals in the number, and in some cases by proper names:

Number	Glosa name	Exact translation
11	mo-mo	one-one
12	mo-bi	one-two
20	bi-ze	two-zero
22	bi-bi	two-two
100	hekto (mo-ze-ze)	(one) hundred (one-zero-zero)
101	mo-ze-mo	one-zero-one
1.000	(mo-)kilo	(one) thousand
1.000.000	(mo-)miliona	(one) million

Note that some use centi, the older form of hekto, for “hundred”. Centi is now used as “hundredth” in accordance with the ISO standard usage.

Numbers placed after a noun will function as ordinal numbers: u bibli tri, “the third book”. Mo, bi and tri also means single, double and triple, respectively.

== Vocabulary ==
=== Compound words ===
In order to form a composite word in Glosa, one just combines existing words. For example:

- pe – person who does/person (short form of persona)
- an – male (from andros)
- fe – female (from femina)
- do – building where (from domo meaning house)
- lo – location, place of (from loko)

Therefore, a student is stude-pe (one who studies), a male student is stude-an, a female student is stude-fe and a building where students study (school, college, etc.) is a stude-do. Likewise a hospital is pato-do (from the word pathology but meaning sickness), literally meaning a house/building for the sick.

- tegu – cover; ceiling; (to) shutter; deck; lid (cover); eclipse; (to) shelter; casing
- oku-tegu – eyelid
- agri – field, countryside
- agri-lo – farm
- a-nu – until now

Meals can also be formed by noun-compounding:

- evening – vespera
- to eat, to devour – vora
- dinner, supper – vespera-vora

=== Sample words and expressions ===
==== Phrases and expressions ====
- Hello, greetings, salutations – Saluta!, Ave!
- Welcome – Bene-veni
- Please! – Place!
- Sorry! – Pardo!, Penite!
- What is your name? – Tu habe qo nomina/nima?

(literally ”You have what name?”)

- My name is... – Mi nomina/nima es...
- Where am I – Qo-lo es mi?
- How much? – Qanto?
- Do you speak Glosa – Qe tu dice Glosa?
- I don't understand you – Mi ne logi/kompreni tu.
- Thank you – Gratia
- You're welcome – Es nuli.

(literally ”It's nothing”)

- Here's to your health – A tu eu-sani.
- Bless you!/Gesundheit! – (Eu-)sani (a tu)!
- It is a nice day – Es u bene di.
- I love you – Mi amo tu.
- Goodbye – Vale.
- What is that? – Qo-ra es u-la?
- That is...? – U-la es...?
- How are you? – Komo tu?
- Good morning! – Boni matina/mana!
- Good evening! – Boni po-meso-di! Boni di!

(literally ”Good after mid-day”, ”Good day”)

- Good night! – Boni noktu!
- Good night, sweet dreams – Boni somni! Plu boni sonia!
- I can't find an error – Mi ne pote detekti u defekti.

==== Words ====
- well – bene
- be well – vale
- good/well – boni/bene/eu
- well (healthy) – sani
- ki – movement, to go, to move
- a/an/the (singular) – u before all consonants but h; un before vowels and h
- the/some (plural) – plu
- a cat, the cat – u feli(s)
- cats – plu feli(s)
- dog – kanis
- pig – sui
- bovine (cow/bull) – bovi (fe-bovi, an-bovi)
- horse – equs
- frog – rana
- bird – avi
- bee – apis
- spider – aranea
- fish – piski

=== Word derivation ===
Generally, the following derivation rules apply when creating new words for Glosa. Some basic words (often that act as specificational prefixes) are shortened (such as "an", "fe", or "pe").

Indefinite words remain as they are (ad, de, si, kata).

Derivational Rules (from Latin)
Latin Ending	Glosa Ending	Example
-a, -ae (from genitive)	-a	silva (forest)
-us, -us	-u	manu (hand)
-is, -is	-i	turi (tower, turret)
adjectives: -us/-a/-um	-o	karo (dear)
verbs: -ere	-e	face (to make, build, commit)
verbs: -are	-a	lauda (to praise, esteem, applause)
verbs: -ire	-i	veni (to arrive)

Latin words in the second declension become the nominative plural. Therefore:

- -us, -i ending are adapted to -i ending (rami, soni, tubi)
- -er, -ri become -ri (libri)
- -um, -i use the -a ending in Glosa (exempla)

Words built from the perfect-tense-radix become -i (cepti, fluxi, komposi). Latin -io, -ionis are not changed to the ablative-ending (-ione) but keep the nominatives -io (natio, okasio, petitio, religio, tensio).

The same occurs when deriving from Greek (however, Greek lacks an ablative so the dative is used instead):

- -os, -u become -o (fobo, orto).

Derivational Rules (from Greek)
Greek Ending	Glosa Ending	Example
-α, -ης	-a	glosa (language)
-α, -ατος	-a	soma (body)
-ος, -ου	-o	bio (life)
-ιος, -ίου	-i	heli (sun)
-ον, -ου	-a	zoa (animal)
-ω, -ειν	-o	grafo (to write)

Occasionally the Greek aorist-root is taken instead of present-tense-root (gene). Greek verbs become -o (1st person singular) such as: skizo. Species names keep nominative (equs, ursus).

Any time Greek CH, Y, RH, TH and PH occur they become K, I, R, T and F, respectively, in Glosa.

== Texts ==
There are very few texts translated or written in Glosa. The most important one is the translation of Around the World in Eighty Days (Peri Geo Tem Okto-ze Di), by Gary R. Miller. Others are If— (Si) and Hills Like White Elephants (Plu buno homo plu leuko elefa), both translated by Vicente Costalago.

Two textbooks have been written in Glosa, one on history, another one on international auxiliary languages both by Vicente Costalago.

== Sample texts ==
=== Language planning ===
The following is taken from a text on language planning by Lancelot Hogben, author of Glosas precursor Interglossa. First a sample with Glosa and English side by side:

Glosa	English
U logika ge-face verba-lista sio apo multi sinonima alo proxi-sinonima, de qi Anglo-Amerika lingua es ple. Ex. little–small, big–large, begin–commence. Id ne nece tolera funktio imbrika homo band – ribbon – strip.	A rationally constructed word-list would discard many synonyms or near-synonyms, of which the Anglo-American language is full. For example, little–small, big–large, begin–commence. It need not tolerate functional overlap as with band – ribbon – strip.

And here continued as regular text, first in Glosa:

Plus, id sio evita excesi specializa per face mo verba akti qod in Plu Palaeo Lingua gene face per tri alo ma. Exempla, u France demo nima un extra tegu de homi soma la peau, u-la de cepa la pelure; e u-la de botuli la cotte.

And the English translation of the last paragraph:

Also, it would avoid over-specialization by making one word do what in natural languages is often done by three or more. For example, the French call the outer cover of the human body la peau, that of the onion la pelure, and that of the sausage la cotte.

=== The Lord's Prayer ===
The following is the Lord's Prayer in Glosa, compared with Interglossa, Frater and English versions, respectively:

Glosa version

Na patri in urani:
na volu; tu nomina gene honora,
tu krati veni e
tu tende gene akti
epi geo homo in urani.
Place don a na nu-di na di-pani
e tu pardo na plu Mali akti;
metri na pardo mu; qi akti Mali a na.
E ne direkti na a u proba;
sed libe na ab Mali.
Ka tu tena u krati, u dina
e un eufamo pan tem.
Amen.

Interglossa

Na Parenta in Urani:
Na dicte volo; tu Nomino gene revero;
plus tu Crati habe accido;
plus u Demo acte harmono tu Tendo
epi Geo homo in Urani;
Na dicte petitio: Tu date plu di Pani a Na;
plus Tu acte pardo plu malo Acte de Na;
metro Na acte pardo Mu; Su acte malo de Na.
Peti Tu non acte dirigo Na a plu malo Offero;
Hetero, Tu date libero Na apo Malo.
Causo Tu tene u Crati plus u Dyno plus un eu Famo
pan Tem.
Amen.

Frater version

Pater mis in sel,
nam ni es santa,
nasionroi ni aribe,
desir ni es fakto,
sur geo omo sin sel.
Don mis jurdis pani jur mis.
Perdon erormulti mis,
omo mis perdon filone mis.
Ne direk mis a proba,
e libere mis ot benne.
Amen.

English

Our Father in heaven,
hallowed be your name,
your kingdom come,
your will be done,
on earth as in heaven.
Give us today our daily bread.
Forgive us our sins
as we forgive those who sin against us.
Save us from the time of trial
and deliver us from evil.
For the kingdom, the power,
and the glory are yours
now and for ever.
Amen.

Notice that in Glosa the word ”sky” is derived from Greek (Πάτερ ἡμῶν ὁ ἐν τοῖς οὐρανοῖς, Ουρανός, God of the sky → Urani, sky) while Frater uses a Latin derived word (caelum, caeli).
