= Leslie Hogben =

American mathematician

Leslie Hogben is an American mathematician specializing in graph theory and linear algebra, and known for her mentorship of graduate students in mathematics. She is a professor emerita of mathematics at Iowa State University, where she held the Dio Lewis Holl Chair in Applied Mathematics 2012–2020; she was also professor (by courtesy) of electrical and computer engineering at Iowa State, associate dean for graduate studies and faculty development of the College of Liberal Arts and Sciences at Iowa State (2019–2024). Since 2007 she has worked part-time for the American Institute of Mathematics, initially as associate director for diversity (2007–2024) and now as Director of Research Communities (2024–present).

== Education and career ==
Hogben graduated summa cum laude in 1974 from Swarthmore College, and completed her Ph.D. in 1978 at Yale University. Her dissertation, Radical Classes of Jordan Algebras, concerned ring theory and was supervised by Nathan Jacobson.

She joined Iowa State University as a tenure-track instructor in 1978. There, she was tenured in 1983, promoted to full professor in 2006, and given the Dio Lewis Holl Chair in 2012, and retired in 2024. She added her courtesy appointment in electrical and computer engineering in 2013. She was named associate dean in 2019. She retired from Iowa State in 2024 and is now a Professor Emerita.

Hogben became associate director for diversity at the American Institute of Mathematics in 2007 and transitioned to become Director of Research Communities (a new AIM program) in 2024.

In 2024 Hogben was appointed as an Adjunct Professor at Purdue University (a courtesy affiliation with no duties).

== Books ==
Hogben is the editor of the Handbook of Linear Algebra (CRC Press, 2007; 2nd ed., 2014) and edited several other books. She is the author (with Jephian Lin and Bryan Shader) of Inverse Problems and Zero Forcing for Graphs (AMS, 2022) and the author of the textbook Elementary Linear Algebra (West Publishing, 1987).

== Recognition ==
The Association for Women in Mathematics has included her in the 2020 class of AWM Fellows for "being an endless champion for women in mathematics for nearly 40 years; for her outstanding record of involvement in programs to promote equal treatment and equal opportunities for women and minorities in mathematics". In 2020, she was elected Fellow of the American Association for the Advancement of Science, in the Section on Mathematics. She was elected as a Fellow of the American Mathematical Society in the 2024 class of fellows.

== Personal life ==
Hogben is the daughter of C. A. M. Hogben, a physiologist at George Washington University and later the University of Iowa. She is the granddaughter of British zoologist and medical statistician Lancelot Hogben and of his wife, demographer Enid Charles. She married mathematician Mark Hunacek, who became a teaching professor at Iowa State after many years as an assistant attorney general for the State of Iowa.
