= Lingua sistemfrater =

Constructed language

- Created by: Pham Xuan Thai
- Date: 1957
- Setting and usage: International auxiliary language
- Purpose: Constructed language: International auxiliary language; Lingua sistemfrater
- Sources: A posteriori language with a predominantly Romance vocabulary and an Asian-based grammar

Language codes
- ISO 639-3: None (mis)
- Glottolog: None

Lingua sistemfrater ("Language of Brotherhood"), also referred to as Frater, is an a posteriori international auxiliary language created by Vietnamese translator Phạm Xuân Thái in 1957 as Frater (Lingua sistemfrater): The simplest International Language Ever Constructed. The language uses a largely Greco-Latin lexicon, and an Asian-influenced grammar.

Frater was one of the (comparatively rare) international languages created in Asia, and had a vocabulary of more than 6,000 words.

== Phonology and orthography ==
Frater used an orthography of eighteen letters from the Latin script: five vowels: a, e, i, o, u, and thirteen consonants: b, d, f, g, j, k, l, m, n, p, r, s, and t. These letters were enunciated as their pronunciations in the International Phonetic Alphabet, with the following exceptions:

- ⟨j⟩ is pronounced as [z];
- The letters ⟨e⟩ and ⟨o⟩ are pronounced as the diphthongs [ei] and [ou], respectively.

The stress is placed on the last syllable of the word; there are no silent letters.

== Grammar ==
=== Article ===
There is no indefinite article or definite article.

=== Personal Pronouns ===
	Singular					Plural		
	first	second	third			first	second	third
English	I	you	he	she	it	we	you	they
Frater	mi	ni	ili			mis	nis	ilis

Possessives are formed by adding the preposition ot before the pronoun. Unlike English that distinguishes three genders for the third-person singular pronoun, the pronoun was invariable.

=== Nouns ===
The noun in Frater is invariable. Plurals can be formed by adding -multi (many) to the end of the noun:

mensa (table) - mensamulti (tables)

=== Adjectives ===
The adjective in Frater is invariable and is always placed after the noun; except for cardinal numbers.

	Frater	English
Comparative of superiority	plus	more than
Comparative of inferiority	plusne	less than
Comparative of equality	je	as...as
Absolute superlative	tele	very
Superlative of superiority	plasuni	the most
Superlative of inferiority	plasunine	the least

=== Numbers ===
The cardinal numbers in Frater:

1 - uni 2 - bi 3 - tri 4 - kuadri 5 - kuinti 6 - ses 7 - sep 8 - okta 9 - nona 10 - deka

11 - dekauni 12 - dekabi 13 - dekatri

20 - bideka 24 - bidekakuadri

30 - trideka 40 - kuadrideka

85 - oktadekakuinti

100 - senti 367 - trisenti-sesdeka-sep 600 - sessenti

1000 - mil 1000000 - milion

Ordinal numbers are formed by placing the cardinal number after the noun.

=== Verbs ===
The verb in Frater is invariable in person and in number.

Grammatical form	Frater	English
Infinitive	ide	to think
Present	Mi ide	I think
Past	Ni ide pas	You thought
Future	Ili ide futur	He/she/it will think
Imperative	Ide!	Think!
Conditional	Mis ide probable	We would think

The passive voice is formed by adding the auxiliary verb es before the infinitive: Ilis es trauma (they are wounded).

=== Syntax ===
The syntax in Frater is: Subject - Verb - Object.

Questions are formed by placing the verb before the subject.

Interrogative words include: antropkia (who), kia (what), plaskia (where), temkia (when), prokia (why), kak (how), and multikia (how much; how many).

== Sample text ==
=== The Lord's Prayer ===
For comparison the Lord's Prayer is provided in Frater, Glosa (a later auxiliary language with isolating grammar and Greco-Latin vocabulary), Latin and English.

Frater

Pater mis in sel,
nam ni es santa,
nasionroi ni aribe,
desir ni es fakto,
sur geo omo sin sel.
Don mis jurdis pani jur mis.
Perdon erormulti mis,
omo mis perdon filone mis.
Ne direk mis a proba,
e libere mis ot benne.

Glosa

Na patri in urani:
na volu; tu nomina gene honora,
tu krati veni e
tu tende gene akti
epi geo homo in urani.
Place don a na nu-di na di-pani
e tu pardo na plu Mali akti;
metri na pardo mu; qi akti Mali a na.
E ne direkti na a u proba;
sed libe na ab Mali.
Ka tu tena u krati, u dina
e un eufamo pan tem.
Amen.

Latin (Roman Missal)

Pater noster qui es in caelis
sanctificetur nomen tuum
adveniat regnum tuum
fiat voluntas tua sicut
in caelo et in terra
Panem nostrum cotidianum da nobis hodie
et dimitte nobis debita nostra
sicut et nos dimittimus debitoribus nostris
et ne nos inducas in tentationem
sed libera nos a malo

English (1662 Anglican BCP)

Our Father, which art in heaven,
Hallowed be thy Name;
Thy kingdom come;
Thy will be done
in earth, as it is in heaven:
Give us this day our daily bread;
And forgive us our trespasses,
as we forgive them that trespass against us;
And lead us not into temptation,
But deliver us from evil;
[Doxology: ]For thine is the kingdom,
and the power, and the glory,
For ever and ever.
Amen.
