= Glose =

Spanish poetic form

Glosa (English: Glose or Gloss) is a poetic form that borrows lines from another, usually more famous poem and incorporates its text. The term originates from the practice of fifteenth century Spanish courtiers composing poems with a quatrain from a better-known poem and the repetition of a line from that quatrain at the end of a newly composed stanza. Most glosa contain an epigraph from the borrowed quatrain followed by four decima. Although it is no longer common in Spain, modern English examples exist including Marilyn Hacker's "Glose".

== Examples ==
In the novel Don Quixote by Miguel de Cervantes, Don Lorenzo quotes the following Glose which is translated by John Ormsby:

Could ‘was’ become an ‘is’ for me,
Then would I ask no more than this;
Or could, for me, the time that is
Become the time that is to be!—

GLOSS

Dame Fortune once upon a day
To me was bountiful and kind;
But all things change; she changed her mind,
And what she gave she took away.
O Fortune, long I’ve sued to thee;
The gifts thou gavest me restore,
For, trust me, I would ask no more,
Could ‘was’ become an ‘is’ for me.

No other prize I seek to gain,
No triumph, glory, or success,
Only the long-lost happiness,
The memory whereof is pain.
One taste, methinks, of bygone bliss
The heart-consuming fire might stay;
And, so it come without delay,
Then would I ask no more than this.

I ask what cannot be, alas!
That time should ever be, and then
Come back to us, and be again,
No power on earth can bring to pass;
For fleet of foot is he, I wis,
And idly, therefore, do we pray
That what for aye hath left us may
Become for us the time that is.

Perplexed, uncertain, to remain
’Twixt hope and fear, is death, not life;
’Twere better, sure, to end the strife,
And dying, seek release from pain.
And yet, thought were the best for me.
Anon the thought aside I fling,
And to the present fondly cling,
And dread the time that is to be.
