= The International Journal of Developmental Biology =

- Discipline: Developmental biology
- Language: English
- Edited by: Juan Arechaga

Publication details
- Former name: Anales del desarrollo
- History: 1953–present
- Publisher: University of the Basque Country Press (Spain)
- Frequency: Monthly
- Open access: Hybrid
- Impact factor: 1.753 (2015)

Standard abbreviations
- ISO 4: Int. J. Dev. Biol.

Indexing
- CODEN: IJDBE5
- ISSN: 0214-6282 (print); 1696-3547 (web)
- LCCN: 96648178
- OCLC no.: 20626707

Links
- Journal homepage; Online archive

The International Journal of Developmental Biology is a peer-reviewed open access scientific journal covering research in developmental biology. The current editor-in-chief is Juan Arechaga (University of the Basque Country). It was established in 1953 as Anales del desarrollo and obtained its current name in 1989.

== Abstracting and indexing ==
The journal is abstracted and indexed in MEDLINE/PubMed. According to the Journal Citation Reports, the journal has a 2014 impact factor of 1.903, ranking it 35th out of 41 journals in the category "Developmental Biology".
