= Linguistic aesthetics =

Linguistic aesthetics may refer to:

- Phonaesthetics
- Poetry
- Artistic languages
- Euphony
