= Phonaesthetics =

Pleasantness associated with the sounds of words or parts of words

Phonaesthetics (also spelled phonesthetics in North America) is the study of the beauty and pleasantness associated with the sounds of certain words or parts of words. The term was first used in this sense, perhaps by J. R. R. Tolkien, during the mid-20th century and derives from Ancient Greek φωνή (phōnḗ) 'voice, sound' and αἰσθητική (aisthētikḗ) 'aesthetics'. Speech sounds have many aesthetic qualities, some of which are subjectively regarded as euphonious (pleasing) or cacophonous (displeasing). Phonaesthetics remains a budding and often subjective field of study, with no scientifically or otherwise formally established definition; today, it mostly exists as a marginal branch of psychology, phonetics, or poetics.

British linguist David Crystal has regarded phonaesthetics as the study of "phonaesthesia" (i.e., sound symbolism and phonesthemes): that not just words but even certain sound combinations within a particular language carry aesthetic value or associations. For example, he shows that English speakers tend to associate unpleasantness with the sound sl- in such words as sleazy, slime, slug, and slush, or they associate repetition lacking any particular shape with -tter in such words as chatter, glitter, flutter, and shatter.

== Euphony and cacophony ==
Euphony is the effect of sounds being perceived as pleasant, rhythmical, lyrical, or harmonious. Cacophony is the effect of sounds being perceived as harsh, unpleasant, chaotic, and often discordant; these sounds are perhaps meaningless and jumbled together. This is similar to consonance and dissonance in music, which are pleasant and unpleasant sounds respectively. In poetry, for example, euphony may be used deliberately to convey comfort, peace, or serenity, while cacophony may be used to convey discomfort, pain, or disorder. This is often furthered by the combined effect of the meaning beyond just the sounds themselves.

The California Federation of Chaparral Poets uses Emily Dickinson's "A Bird came down the Walk" as an example of euphonious poetry, one passage being "...Oars divide the Ocean, / Too silver for a seam" and John Updike's "Player Piano" as an example of cacophonous poetry, one passage being "My stick fingers click with a snicker / And, chuckling, they knuckle the keys".

== Research ==
David Crystal's 1995 paper "Phonaesthetically Speaking" explores lists, created by reader polls and individual writers, of English words that are commonly regarded as sounding beautiful, to search for any patterns within the words' phonetics. Frequently recurring example words in these lists include gossamer, melody, and tranquil. Crystal's finding, assuming a British Received Pronunciation accent, is that words perceived as pretty tend to have a majority of a wide array of criteria; here are some major ones:

- Three or more syllables (e.g., goss·a·mer and mel·o·dy)
- Stress on the first syllable (e.g., góssamer and mélody)
- /l/ is the most common consonant phoneme, followed by /m, s, n, r, k, t, d/, then a huge drop-off before other consonants (e.g., luminous contains the first four)
- Short vowels (e.g., the schwa, followed in order by the vowels in lid, led, and lad) are favored over long vowels and diphthongs (e.g., as in lied, load, loud)
- Three or more manners of articulation (with approximant consonants the most common, followed by stop consonants, and so on)

A perfect example word, according to these findings, is tremulous. Crystal also suggests the invented words ramelon /ˈræməlɒn/ and drematol /ˈdrɛmətɒl/, which he notes are similar to the types of names often employed in the marketing of pharmaceutical drugs.

== Cellar door ==
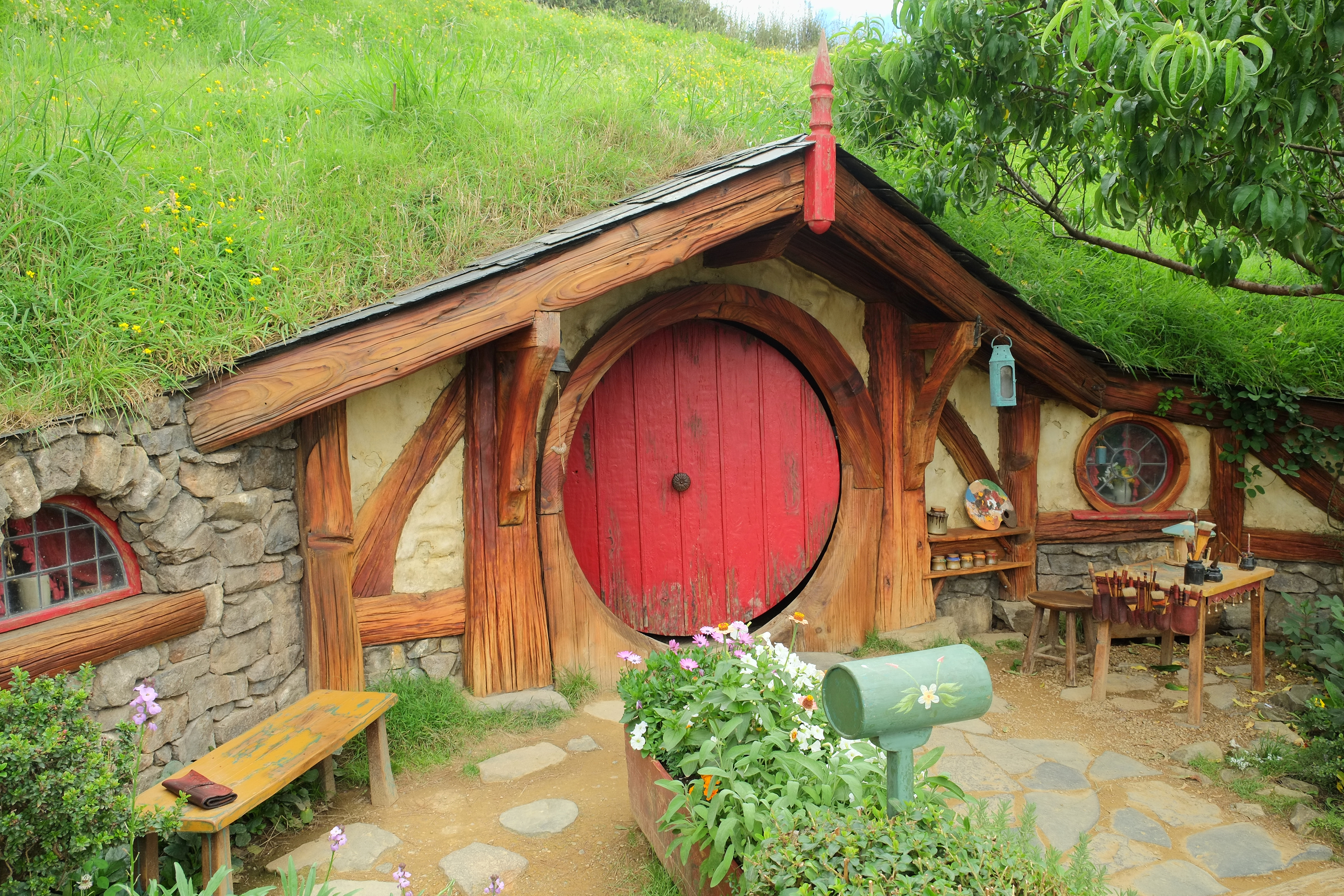
The entrance of the "hobbit hole", which Tolkien devised, is a type of "cellar door", the idea of whose phonetic beauty he popularized.

The English compound noun cellar door has been widely cited as an example of a word or phrase that is beautiful purely in terms of its sound (i.e., euphony) without inherent regard for its meaning. The phenomenon of cellar door being regarded as euphonious appears to have begun in the very early twentieth century, first attested in the 1903 novel Gee-Boy by the Shakespeare scholar Cyrus Lauron Hooper. It has been promoted as beautiful-sounding by various writers; linguist Geoffrey Nunberg specifically names the writers H. L. Mencken in 1920; David Allan Robertson in 1921; Dorothy Parker, Hendrik Willem van Loon, and Albert Payson Terhune in the 1930s; George Jean Nathan in 1935; J. R. R. Tolkien in a lecture, "English and Welsh", delivered in 1955 (in which he described his reverence for the Welsh language and about which he said "cellar doors [i.e. beautiful words] are extraordinarily frequent"; see also Sound and language in Middle-earth); and C. S. Lewis in 1963. Furthermore, the phenomenon itself is touched upon in many sources and media, including anonymous short pieces in the September 1905 issue of Harper's Magazine (Note: The piece is a vignette about a Spaniard that told to an American lady: "Your language too has soft and beautiful words, but they are not always appreciated. What could be more musical than your word cellar-door?"") and the August 1919 issue of Cartoons Magazine, the 1967 novel Why Are We in Vietnam? by Norman Mailer, the 1967 play It's Called the Sugar Plum by Israel Horovitz, a 1991 essay by Jacques Barzun, the 2001 psychological drama film Donnie Darko, and a scene in the 2019 movie Tolkien.

The origin of cellar door being considered as an inherently beautiful or musical phrase is mysterious. However, in 2014, Nunberg speculated that the phenomenon might have arisen from Philip Wingate and Henry W. Petrie's 1894 hit song "I Don't Want to Play in Your Yard", which contains the lyric "You'll be sorry when you see me sliding down our cellar door." Following the song's success, "slide down my cellar door" became a popular catchphrase up until the 1930s or 1940s to mean engaging in a type of friendship or camaraderie reminiscent of childhood innocence. (Note: Nunberg identifies "Playmates" as an earlier song from which "I Don't Want to Play in Your Yard" was derived; in fact the derivation is the reverse.) A 1914 essay about Edgar Allan Poe's choice of the word "Nevermore" in his 1845 poem "The Raven" as being based on euphony may have spawned an unverified legend, propagated by syndicated columnists like Frank Colby in 1949 and L. M. Boyd in 1979, that cellar door was Poe's favorite phrase.

Tolkien, Lewis, and others have suggested that cellar door's auditory beauty becomes more apparent the more the word is dissociated from its literal meaning, for example, by using alternative spellings such as Selador, Selladore, Celador, Selidor (an island name in Ursula K. Le Guin's Earthsea series), or Salidar (Robert Jordan's The Wheel of Time series), which take on the quality of an enchanting name (and some of which suggest a specifically standard British pronunciation of the word: /ˌsɛləˈdɔː/), (Note: In a 1966 interview, Tolkien said: "Supposing you say some quite ordinary words to me—'cellar door', say. From that, I might think of a name 'Selador', and from that a character, a situation begins to grow".) (Note: Most English-speaking people ... will admit that cellar door is 'beautiful', especially if dissociated from its sense (and from its spelling). More beautiful than, say, sky, and far more beautiful than beautiful. Well then, in Welsh for me cellar doors [i.e. such beautiful words] are extraordinarily frequent, and moving to the higher dimension, the words in which there is pleasure in the contemplation of the association of form and sense are abundant.) which is homophonous with "sell a daw."

== See also ==
- Affection (linguistics) – Vowel sound change in Celtic languages
- Assimilation (linguistics) – Phenomenon in linguistics
- Cacofonix
- Dissimilation (phonology) – Linguistic phenomenon where sounds diverge
- Epenthesis – Phonological process involving the addition of one or more sounds to a word
- Inherently funny word – Words which have been described as inherently funny
- Japanese sound symbolism – Large amount of sound-symbolic words in Japanese
- Onomatopoeia – Words that imitate the sound they describe
- Phonestheme – Concept in linguistics
- Phono-semantic matching – Type of multi-source neologism
- Phonosemantics – Phenomenon in linguistics
- Sandhi – Type of sound change at morpheme or syllable boundaries ("euphonic" rules in Sanskrit grammar)
- Vogon poetry – Fictional alien race in The Hitchhiker's Guide to the Galaxy
- Vowel harmony – Sound change in vowels
