= A Bird came down the Walk =

Poem by Emily Dickinson

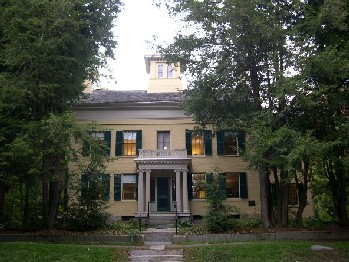
Dickinson Homestead in Amherst, Massachusetts, 2004

"A Bird came down the Walk" is a short poem by Emily Dickinson (1830–1886) that tells of the poet's encounter with a worm-eating bird. The poem was first published in 1891 in the second collection of Dickinson's poems.

== Text ==
Close transcription

A Bird, came down the Walk -
He did not know I saw -
He bit an Angle Worm in halves
And ate the fellow, raw,

And then, he drank a Dew
From a convenient Grass -
And then hopped sidewise to the Wall
To let a Beetle pass -

He glanced with rapid eyes,
That hurried all abroad -
They looked like frightened Beads, I thought,
He stirred his Velvet Head. -

Like one in danger, Cautious,
I offered him a Crumb,
And he unrolled his feathers,
And rowed him softer Home -

Than Oars divide the Ocean,
Too silver for a seam,
Or Butterflies, off Banks of Noon,
Leap, plashless as they swim.

First published version

IN THE GARDEN

A bird came down the walk:
He did not know I saw;
He bit an angle-worm in halves
And ate the fellow, raw.

And then, he drank a dew
From a convenient grass,
And then hopped sidewise to the wall
To let a beetle pass.

He glanced with rapid eyes
That hurried all abroad,—
They looked like frightened beads, I thought;
He stirred his velvet head

Like one in danger; cautious,
I offered him a crumb,
And he unrolled his feathers
And rowed him softer home

Than oars divide the ocean,
Too silver for a seam,
Or butterflies, off banks of noon,
Leap, plashless, as they swim.

== Critique ==
Helen Vendler regards the poem as a "bizarre little narrative" but one that typifies many of Dickinson's best qualities. She likens the poet to a reporter observing a murderer in the act, and later, pretending fear that the murderer may be dangerous to herself and must be mollified by a "crumb". The bird takes flight and Vendler regards what follows - the description of the bird in flight - as "the astonishing part of the poem". Vendler notes that the poem typifies Dickinson's "cool eye, her unsparing factuality, her startling similes and metaphors, her psychological observations of herself and others, her capacity for showing herself mistaken, and her exquisite relish of natural beauty".

Harold Bloom notes that the bird displays a "complex mix of qualities: ferocity, fastidiousness, courtesy, fear, and grace", and writes that the description of the bird's flight is that seen by the soul rather than the "finite eyes".

Vendler observes that Dickinson wrote two versions of the middle portion of the poem. The version she sent to her literary mentor Thomas Wentworth Higginson has no punctuation after "head" and a period after the word "cautious". In Dickinson's personal copy, there also is no punctuation after "Head" but there is a comma after "Cautious". In the first version then, the bird is cautious, but in the second version, it is the poet who is cautious. In a fair copy inscribed in a fascicle, both a period and a dash follow "Head", and a comma follows "Cautious". The fair copy version is the one usually printed, and, as Vendler notes, this version accords with Dickinson's comic sense.

== See also ==
- List of Emily Dickinson poems
