= List of Emily Dickinson poems =

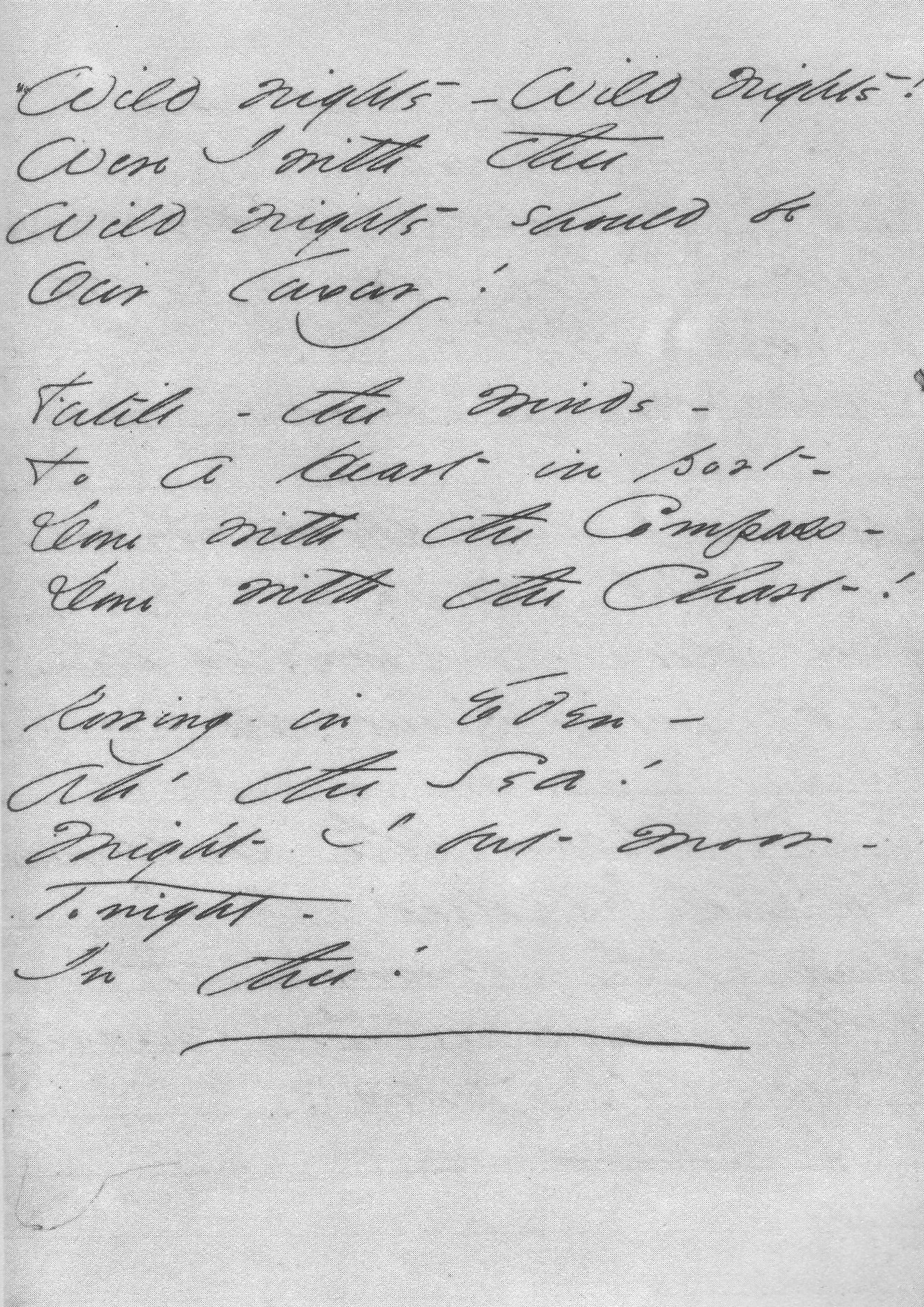
Autograph manuscript of "Wild nights - Wild nights!" (1861)

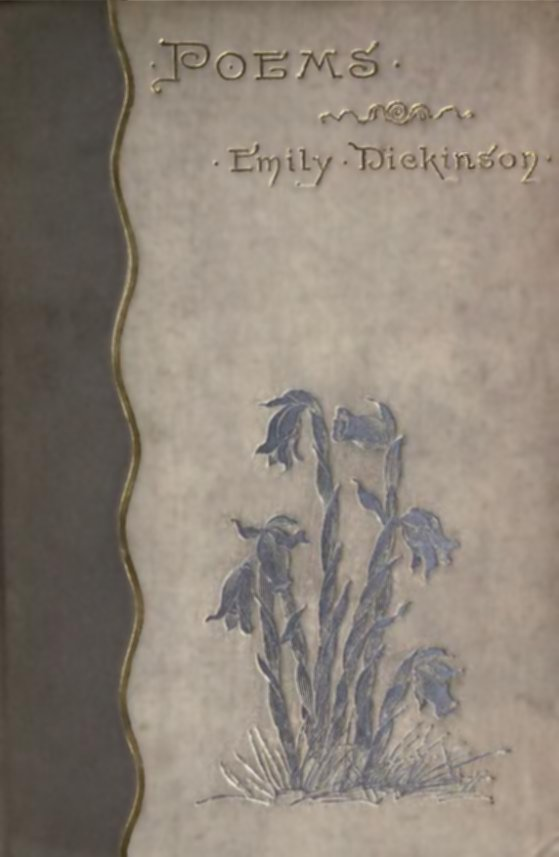
First edition of Poems by Emily Dickinson (1890)

Emily Dickinson's poems, left in manuscript at her death in 1886, were only gradually published over the next seven decades.

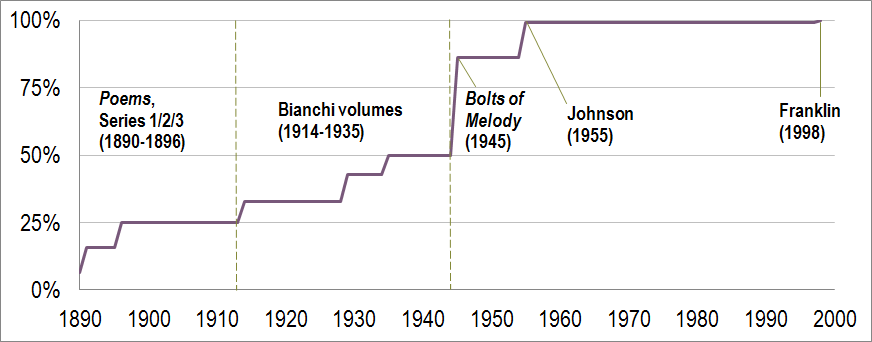
Proportion of Emily Dickinson's poetry published over time in the 7 Todd & Bianchi volumes, and the variorum editions of 1955 and 1998.

This is a list of poems by Emily Dickinson. In addition to the list of first lines which link to the poems' texts, the table notes each poem's publication in several of the most significant collections of Emily Dickinson's poetry—the "manuscript books" created by Dickinson herself before her demise and published posthumously in 1981; the seven volumes of poetry published posthumously from 1890 to 1945; the cumulative collections of 1924, 1930, and 1937; and the scholarly editions of 1955 and 1998.

Important publications which are not represented in the table include the 10 poems published (anonymously) during Dickinson's lifetime; and editions of her letters, published from 1894 on, which include some poems within their texts. In all these cases, the poem itself occurs in the list, but these specific publications of the poem are not noted.

== Key ==
Rows

A row in the table below is defined as any set of lines that is categorized either by Johnson (1955) or by Franklin (1998)—or, in the vast majority of cases, by both—as a poem written by Emily Dickinson. Johnson recognizes 1775 poems, and Franklin 1789; however each, in a handful of cases, categorizes as multiple poems lines which the other categorizes as a single poem. This mutual splitting results in a table of 1799 rows.

Columns

- First Line: Poems are alphabetized by their first line. Punctuation, capitalization and even wording of the first lines may vary depending on the edition of each poem's text used.
- F/S: Position in Fascicles or Sets. Dickinson preserved about 2/3 of her poems in "manuscript books" or "packets" of two types. Fascicles are composed of sheets folded in half (yielding one signature of 2 leaves and 4 pages), laid on top of each other (not nested), and bound with string. Other poems are preserved in what R. W. Franklin calls Sets which are groups of folded signatures appropriate for, and possibly intended for, similar binding, but never actually bound. The code in the table below indicates "F" for fascicle or "S" for set, then the fascicle number 01-40 or set number 01-15, then the order of the 4-page signature (or occasionally unfolded 1-leaf 2-page sheet), finally the order of the poem within the fascicle or set. An asterisk indicates that this poem, or part of this poem, occurs elsewhere in the fascicles or sets but its subsequent occurrences are not noted. Thus "F01.03.016*" indicates the 16th poem within fascicle #1, which occurs on the 3rd signature or sheet bound in that fascicle; and that this poem (or part of it) also recurs elsewhere in the fascicles or sets.
- 1st: First publication of the poem within the Todd & Bianchi volumes of 1890-1945 (see References). This does not account for the handful of poems published during Emily Dickinson's lifetime, nor poems which first appeared within published letters.
- 1stS.P: Section and Poem number (both converted to Arabic numerals, and separated by a period) of the poem in its 1st publication as noted above. Poems in the volumes of 1929 and 1935 are not numbered, so page numbers are given in place of poem numbers. An asterisk indicates that this poem, or part of this poem, occurs elsewhere in the Todd & Bianchi volumes but its subsequent occurrences are not noted.
- Collect: Section and Poem number (both converted to Arabic numerals, and separated by a period) in the Bianchi collections of 1924-1937 (see References).
- J#: Number assigned by Thomas H. Johnson in his variorum edition of 1955. Numbering represents Johnson's judgment of chronology.
- Fr#: Number assigned by R. W. Franklin in his variorum edition of 1998. Numbering represents Franklin's judgment of chronology.

== Table ==
First Line (often used as title)	F/S	1st	1stS.P	Collect	J#	Fr#
A Bee his burnished Carriage	S13.01.002	1945	1.127		1339	1351
A Bird came down the Walk	F17.05.013	1891	3.023	2.023	328	359
A brief but patient illness	F01.01.002	1891	3.047	2.047	18	22
A Burdock — clawed my Gown	S06b.04.016	1945	1.135		229	289
A Cap of Lead across the sky		1914	2.054	5.054	1649	1735
A Charm invests a face	F15.03.008	1891	2.010	3.028	421	430
A chastened Grace is twice a Grace						1676
A chilly Peace infests the Grass		1945	1.071		1443	1469
A Clock stopped	F11.03.006	1896	4.053	4.135	287	259
A Cloud withdrew from the Sky	S06b.07.025	1945	1.015		895	1077
A Coffin — is a small Domain	S03.01.001	1945	1.386		943	890
A Counterfeit — a Plated Person					1453	1514
A curious Cloud surprised the Sky	F24.01.004	1945	1.016		1710	509
A darting fear — a pomp — a tear					87	A13-6
A Day! Help! Help! Another Day!	F02.04.017	1945	1.004		42	58
A Death blow is a Life blow to Some	S07.07.033	1891	4.006	4.046	816	966
A Deed knocks first at Thought		1891	1.041	1.067	1216	1294
A Dew sufficed itself	S14.01.001	1896	3.017	2.099	1437	1372
A Diamond on the Hand					1108	1131
A Dimple in the Tomb					1489	1522
A Door just opened on a street	S05.04.019	1896	1.028	1.111	953	914
A doubt if it be Us	S05.02.005	1945	1.510		859	903
A Drop Fell on the Apple Tree	F38.01.001	1890	3.011	2.062	794	846
A Drunkard cannot meet a Cork		1945	1.192		1628	1630
A Dying Tiger — moaned for Drink	F28.02.005	1945	1.347		566	529
A face devoid of love or grace		1896	1.018	1.101	1711	1774
A faded Boy — in sallow Clothes		1945	1.239		1524	1549
A feather from the Whippoorwill	F12.01.002	1929	A.199	A.002	161	208
A Field of Stubble, lying sere					1407	1419
A first Mute Coming	F35.06.020	1935	4.139	7.121	702	732
A Flower will not trouble her, it has so small a Foot,					1621	1648
A full fed Rose on meals of Tint					1154	1141
A fuzzy fellow, without feet	F08.03.010	1929	3.062	6.054	173	171
A great Hope fell		1945	1.206		1123	1187
A happy lip — breaks sudden	F12.08.026	1935	4.123	7.106	353	335
A House upon the Height	F27.03.009	1945	1.556		399	555
A Lady red — amid the Hill	F06.01.002	1896	3.004	2.086	74	137
A lane of Yellow led the eye					1650	1741
A Letter is a joy of Earth					1639	1672
A Light exists in Spring	S07.06.028	1896	3.003	2.085	812	962
A little bread — a crust — a crumb	F10.03.012	1896	1.051	1.134	159	135
A little Dog that wags his tail	S10.03.008	1945	1.157		1185	1236
A little East of Jordan	F07.01.001	1914	4.103	5.105	59	145
A little Madness in the Spring		1914	2.038	5.038	1333	1356
A little overflowing word				5.136	1467	1501
A little Road — not made of Man	F34.01.003	1890	3.010	2.061	647	758
A little Snow was here and there		1945	1.252		1444	1480
A long — long Sleep — A famous — Sleep	F22.03.008	1896	4.057	4.139	654	463
A loss of something ever felt I	S06b.06.020	1945	1.180		959	1072
A Man may make a Remark	S05.04.018	1945	1.448		952	913
A Mien to move a Queen	F11.01.001	1935	2.041	7.034	283	254
A Mine there is no Man would own					1117	1162
A Moth the hue of this	S07.02.009	1945	1.133		841	944
A Murmur in the Trees — to note	F15.05.011	1896	3.008	2.090	416	433
A narrow Fellow in the Grass	S06c.03.009	1891	3.024	2.024	986	1096
A nearness to Tremendousness	F40.02.005	1935	4.148	7.130	963	824
A Night — there lay the Days between	F26.06.021	1945	1.048		471	609
A not admitting of the wound		1945	1.206		1123	1188
A Pang is more conspicuous in Spring		1945	1.475		1530	1545
A Pit — but Heaven over it	F24.01.003*	1945	1.532		1712	508
A Plated Life — diversified	F38.06.019	1935	2.080	7.071	806	864
A poor — torn heart — a tattered heart	F06.03.013	1891	1.023	1.049	78	125
A precious — mouldering pleasure — 'tis	F25.01.001	1890	1.010	1.010	371	569
A Prison gets to be a friend	F22.01.001	1929	1.021	6.019	652	456
A prompt — executive Bird is the Jay	S07.20.097*	1914	2.066	5.066	1177	1022
A Rat surrendered here	S14.02.006	1945	1.119		1340	1377
A Route of Evanescence		1891	3.015	2.015	1463	1489
A Saucer holds a Cup		1945	1.145		1374	1407
A science — so the Savants say	F07.01.003	1929	1.026	6.023	100	147
A Secret told	F31.04.014	1929	1.029	6.026	381	643
A sepal, petal, and a thorn	F01.01.005	1896	3.011	2.093	19	25
A Shade upon the mind there passes	S06a.02.007	1945	1.397		882	1114
A shady friend — for Torrid days	F14.01.004	1891	1.034	1.060	278	306
A Sickness of this World it most occasions	S07.13.063	1896	4.033	4.115	1044	993
A single Clover Plank		1945	1.124		1343	1297
A single Screw of Flesh	F12.02.009	1935	3.107	7.092	263	293
A slash of Blue	F09.07.026	1935	2.046	7.038	204	233
A Sloop of Amber slips away		1896	3.026	2.108	1622	1599
A soft Sea washed around the House		1945	1.057		1198	1199
A solemn thing — it was — I said	F14.02.005	1896	2.022	3.056	271	307
A Solemn thing within the Soul	F22.04.012	1945	1.472		483	467
A something in a summer's Day	F05.04.020	1890	3.012	2.063	122	104
A South Wind — has a pathos	F39.04.014	1945	1.017		719	883
A Sparrow took a Slice of Twig		1945	1.113		1211	1257
A Spider sewed at Night		1891	3.027	2.027	1138	1163
A stagnant pleasure like a Pool		1945	1.503		1281	1258
A still — Volcano — Life	F24.03.012	1929	1.036	6.033	601	517
A Thought went up my mind today	F35.05.018	1891	1.020	1.046	701	731
A throe upon the features	F05.04.021	1891	4.038	4.078	71	105
A Toad, can die of Light	F14.05.015	1896	4.055	4.137	583	419
A Tongue — to tell Him I am true!	S01.01.001	1945	1.270		400	673
A Tooth upon Our Peace	F32.04.015	1935	1.011	7.009	459	694
A train went through a burial gate	F20.01.002	1890	4.009	4.009	1761	397
A transport one cannot contain	F12.01.006	1935	3.084	7.073	184	212
A Visitor in Marl	F27.04.012	1935	2.047	7.039	391	558
A Weight with Needles on the pounds	F12.02.010	1935	1.018	7.016	264	294
A Wife — at daybreak I shall be	F32.06.018	1929	6.190	6.172	461	185
A wild Blue sky abreast of Winds		1945	1.019		1415	1418
A Wind that rose	S08a.12.012				1259	1216
A winged spark doth soar about		1945	1.043		1468	1502
A Word dropped careless on a Page					1261	1268
A word is dead		1896	1.006	1.089	1212	278
A Word made Flesh is seldom					1651	1715
A World made penniless by that departure		1945	1.284		1623	1642
A wounded Deer — leaps highest	F08.01.001	1890	1.008	1.008	165	181
Above Oblivion's Tide there is a Pier		1945	2.615		1531	1552
Abraham to kill him		1945	1.160		1317	1332
Absence disembodies — so does Death	S05.02.006	1945	1.489		860	904
Absent Place — an April Day	S07.05.023	1945	1.079		927	958
Adrift! A little boat adrift!	F01.04.021	1896	4.047	4.129	30	6
Advance is Life's condition					1652	1736
Afraid! Of whom am I afraid?	F16.05.011	1890	4.024	4.024	608	345
After a hundred years		1891	4.041	4.081	1147	1149
After all Birds have been investigated and laid aside	S14.05.012	1945	1.108		1395	1383
After great pain, a formal feeling comes	F18.04.011	1929	6.175	6.158	341	372
After the Sun comes out					1148	1127
Again — his voice is at the door		1945	1.259		663	274
Ah Teneriffe!	F36.05.019	1914	2.035	5.035	666	752
Ah, Moon — and Star!	F11.06.011*	1935	3.094	7.081	240	262
Ah, Necromancy Sweet!	F08.04.015	1929	6.155	6.139	177	168
Air has no Residence, no Neighbor	S07.12.058	1945	1.562		1060	989
All but Death, can be Adjusted	F37.05.017	1929	4.089	6.079	749	789
All Circumstances are the Frame	S06a.02.006	1914	5.141	5.145	820	1113
All forgot for recollecting	F40.03.008	1929	6.149	6.134	966	827
All I may, if small	S05.09.039	1914	5.113	5.115	819	799
All men for Honor hardest work		1945	1.463		1193	1205
All overgrown by cunning moss	F07.01.002	1896	4.054	4.136	148	146
All that I do		1945	1.257		1496	1529
All the letters I can write	F19.01.002	1929	3.080	6.072	334	380
All these my banners be	F01.01.009	1945	1.075		22	29
All things swept sole away					1512	1548
Alone and in a Circumstance		1945	1.181		1167	1174
Alone, I cannot be	F12.05.020				298	303
Alter! When the Hills do	F36.06.022	1890	2.003	3.003	729	755
Although I put away his life	F20.03.010	1929	6.160	6.143	366	405
Always Mine!	S07.02.007	1945	1.255		839	942
Ambition cannot find him.	F05.01.006	1914	4.105	5.107	68	115
Ample make this Bed	S06a.03.012	1891	4.023	4.063	829	804
An altered look about the hills	F04.02.008	1891	3.009	2.009	140	90
An antiquated Grace		1945	1.251		1345	1367
An Antiquated Tree		1945	1.143		1514	1544
An awful Tempest mashed the air —	F09.06.020	1891	3.021	2.021	198	224
An Everywhere of Silver	S05.10.041	1891	3.022	2.022	884	931
An honest Tear	S10.01.004	1945	1.517		1192	1232
An Hour is a Sea					825	898
An ignorance a Sunset	F30.06.018	1935	2.050	7.042	552	669
And this of all my Hopes	S07.09.043	1929	6.187	6.169	913	975
And with what body do they come?					1492	1537
Angels, in the early morning	F03.02.007	1890	3.018	2.069	94	73
Answer July	F30.05.016	1935	2.055	7.046	386	667
Apology for Her	S07.05.024	1945	2.645		852	959
Apparently with no surprise		1890	3.025	2.076	1624	1668
Arcturus is his other name	F05.03.015	1891	3.020	2.020	70	117
Are Friends Delight or Pain?	S08b.08.008	1896	1.029	1.112	1199	1224
Arrows enamored of his Heart		1945	2.606		1629	1635
Art thou the thing I wanted?		1945	1.213		1282	1311
Artists wrestled here!	F05.01.002	1945	1.085		110	111
As by the dead we love to sit	F03.02.012	1891	4.012	4.052	88	78
As Children bid the Guest Good Night	F06.04.015	1890	3.017	2.068	133	127
As far from pity, as complaint	F18.01.003	1896	4.017	4.099	496	364
As from the earth the light Balloon		1945	1.597		1630	1651
As Frost is best conceived	S05.04.016	1945	1.512		951	911
As if I asked a common Alms	F01.02.014				323	14
As if some little Arctic flower	F08.05.020	1890	2.010	3.010	180	177
As if the Sea should part	F35.02.006	1929	6.192	6.174	695	720
As imperceptibly as Grief	S05.11.045	1891	3.045	2.045	1540	935
As old as Woe		1945	1.583		1168	1259
As One does Sickness over	S05.05.022	1945	1.477		957	917
As plan for Noon and plan for Night	S06b.06.023	1945	1.380		960	1075
As Sleigh Bells seem in summer		1945	1.367		981	801
As subtle as tomorrow		1945	1.590		1713	1748
As Summer into Autumn slips					1346	1341
As the Starved Maelstrom laps the Navies	S06b.03.010	1945	1.185		872	1064
As Watchers hang upon the East	F05.03.018	1945	1.411		121	120
As we pass Houses musing slow					1653	1723
As willing lid o'er weary eye	S05.11.046	1945	1.037		1050	936
Ashes denote that Fire was	S06c.03.010	1896	1.030	1.113	1063	1097
At Half past Three, a single Bird	S06c.04.012	1891	3.003	2.003	1084	1099
At last, to be identified!	F08.03.011*	1890	4.029	4.029	174	172
At least — to pray — is left — is left	F18.06.017	1891	4.003	4.043	502	377
At leisure is the Soul	F32.01.004	1929	6.185	6.167	618	683
Aurora is the effort	S07.15.074	1945	1.423		1002	1002
Autumn — overlooked my Knitting	F37.04.014	1929	3.083	6.075	748	786
Awake ye muses nine, sing me a strain divine					1	1
Away from Home are some and I	S06b.04.015				821	807
Back from the cordial Grave I drag thee		1945	1.384		1625	1649
Baffled for just a day or two	F02.05.025	1945	1.081		17	66
Banish Air from Air	S07.06.029	1945	1.561		854	963
Be Mine the Doom	S05.06.025*	1945	2.646		845	919
Beauty — be not caused — It Is	F30.01.002	1929	3.057	6.049	516	654
Beauty crowds me till I die		1914	2.043	5.043	1654	1687
Because 'twas Riches I could own	S07.26.128	1935	4.120	7.103	1093	1053
Because He loves Her	S08a.05.005	1945	1.249		1229	1183
Because I could not stop for Death	F23.01.001	1890	4.027	4.027	712	479
Because my Brook is fluent	S10.02.007	1945	1.444		1200	1235
Because that you are going		1945	1.282		1260	1314
Because the Bee may blameless hum	S05.03.013	1945	1.274		869	909
Bee! I'm expecting you!	S07.11.052	1945	1.121		1035	983
Bees are Black, with Gilt Surcingles		1945	1.122		1405	1426
Before He comes we weigh the Time!	S07.03.014				834	949
Before I got my eye put out	F16.01.001	1891	1.036	1.062	327	336
Before the ice is in the pools	F02.01.005	1896	4.045	4.127	37	46
Before you thought of Spring		1891	3.008	2.008	1465	1484
Behind Me — dips Eternity	F36.03.008	1929	6.191	6.173	721	743
Behold this little Bane		1945	1.567		1438	1464
Belshazzar had a Letter		1890	1.025	1.025	1459	1487
Bereaved of all, I went abroad	F39.05.018	1896	4.029	4.111	784	886
Bereavement in their death to feel	F34.01.001	1935	4.118	7.101	645	756
Besides the Autumn poets sing	F06.03.011	1891	3.049	2.049	131	123
Besides this May	S07.09.045	1945	1.427		977	976
Best Gains — must have the Losses' Test					684	499
Best Things dwell out of Sight	S07.17.086	1945	1.543		998	1012
Best Witchcraft is Geometry					1158	1158
Betrothed to Righteousness might be		1945	2.647		1641	1657
Better — than Music! For I — who heard it	F18.07.018	1945	1.454		503	378
Between My Country — and the Others	F40.03.011	1935	4.137	7.119	905	829
Between the form of Life and Life		1945	1.528		1101	1123
Bind me — I still can sing	S07.15.077	1945	1.272		1005	1005
Birthday of but a single pang					1488	1541
Blazing in Gold and quenching in Purple	F13.04.011	1891	3.043	2.043	228	321
Bless God, he went as soldiers	F02.02.009	1896	4.020	4.102	147	52
Bliss is the plaything of the child		1945	1.497		1553	1583
Bloom — is Result — to meet a Flower	S07.23.113	1945	1.078		1058	1038
Bloom upon the Mountain — stated	F37.05.015	1914	2.047	5.047	667	787
Blossoms will run away					1578	1614
Bound — a trouble	F09.01.004*	1935	1.022	7.020	269	240
Bring me the sunset in a cup	F06.02.005	1891	3.039	2.039	128	140
Brother of Ingots — Ah Peru		1945	2.648		1366	1462
But little Carmine hath her face	F27.06.020	1935	2.062	7.053	558	566
But that defeated accent						1660
By a departing light		1945	1.545		1714	1749
By a flower — By a letter	F07.04.019				109	163
By Chivalries as tiny	F03.04.024	1945	2.644		55	37
By homely gift and hindered Words					1563	1611
By my Window have I for Scenery	F38.02.004	1929	3.065	6.057	797	849
By such and such an offering	F02.01.006	1945	2.649		38	47
Candor — my tepid friend		1914	4.107	5.109	1537	1608
Circumference thou Bride of Awe		1945	1.577		1620	1636
Civilization — spurns — the Leopard!		1945	1.540		492	276
Climbing to reach the costly Hearts					1566	1626
Cocoon above! Cocoon below!	F06.02.007	1935	2.057	7.048	129	142
Color — Caste — Denomination	F40.06.018	1929	1.010	6.008	970	836
Come show thy Durham Breast					1542	1572
Come slowly — Eden!	F10.03.014	1890	2.018	3.018	211	205
Conferring with myself					1655	1739
Confirming All who analyze					1268	1303
Conjecturing a Climate	F27.02.005	1929	3.086	6.078	562	551
Conscious am I in my Chamber	F37.01.001	1929	5.117	6.104	679	773
Consulting summer's clock		1945	1.217		1715	1750
Contained in this short Life		1945	1.519		1165	1175
Cosmopolities without a plea		1945	1.105		1589	1592
Could — I do more — for Thee	F21.02.004	1929	3.073	6.065	447	443
Could Hope inspect her Basis		1945	1.469		1283	1282
Could I — then — shut the door					220	188
Could I but ride indefinite	S06b.01.001	1896	3.020	2.102	661	1056
Could live — did live	F02.04.018	1945	1.359		43	59
Could mortal lip divine		1896	1.012	1.095	1409	1456
Could that sweet Darkness where they dwell					1493	1524
Count not that far that can be had					1074	1124
Crisis is a Hair	S06b.04.013	1945	1.353		889	1067
Crisis is sweet and yet the Heart		1914	5.121	5.123	1416	1365
Crumbling is not an instant's Act	S07.17.084	1945	1.509		997	1010
Dare you see a Soul at the White Heat?	F20.02.006	1891	1.007	1.033	365	401
Dear March — Come in		1896	3.005	2.087	1320	1320
Death is a Dialogue between	S07.08.041	1890	4.031	4.031	976	973
Death is like the insect		1896	4.013	4.095	1716	1783
Death is potential to that Man	F31.06.021	1945	1.371		548	650
Death is the supple Suitor		1945	1.374		1445	1470
Death leaves Us homesick, who behind	S06b.03.012	1945	1.370		935	1066
Death sets a Thing significant	F31.03.011	1891	4.013	4.053	360	640
Death warrants are supposed to be		1945	1.355		1375	1409
Death's Waylaying not the sharpest		1945	1.486		1296	1315
Declaiming Waters none may dread					1595	1638
Defrauded I a Butterfly	F38.02.005	1929	3.072	6.064	730	850
Delayed till she had ceased to know	F03.01.001	1890	4.002	4.002	58	67
Delight — becomes pictorial	F28.05.016	1891	1.019	1.045	572	539
Delight is as the flight	F13.03.007	1929	3.077	6.069	257	317
Delight's Despair at setting	S14.02.004	1945	1.500		1299	1375
Denial — is the only fact	F40.02.007	1929	6.165	6.147	965	826
Departed — to the Judgment	F20.01.004	1890	4.003	4.003	524	399
Deprived of other Banquet	F39.02.003	1945	1.224		773	872
Despair's advantage is achieved	F38.03.009	1935	4.144	7.126	799	854
Dew — is the Freshet in the Grass	S06c.05.015	1914	2.044	5.044	1097	1102
Did life's penurious length		1945	1.522		1717	1751
Did Our Best Moment last	F27.05.014	1935	1.020	7.018	393	560
Did the Harebell loose her girdle		1891	2.009	3.027	213	134
Did We abolish Frost	S07.20.099	1945	1.063		1014	1024
Did we disobey Him?	F12.03.016	1945	1.298		267	299
Did you ever stand in a Cavern's Mouth	F29.03.010	1935	1.007	7.005	590	619
Distance — is not the Realm of Fox		1914	5.118	5.120	1155	1128
Distrustful of the Gentian	F01.01.006	1945	2.638		20	26
Do People moulder equally	F19.04.012	1945	1.392		432	390
Dominion lasts until obtained		1945	2.650		1257	1299
Don't put up my Thread and Needle	F32.01.002	1929	4.103	6.092	617	681
Doom is the House without the Door	F33.04.011	1929	1.017	6.015	475	710
Doubt Me! My Dim Companion!	F12.07.023	1890	2.005*	3.005	275	332
Down Time's quaint stream		1914	1.029	5.029	1656	1721
Drab Habitation of Whom?	S05.05.021	1896	3.025	2.107	893	916
Drama's Vitallest Expression is the Common Day	F37.02.004	1929	1.028	6.025	741	776
Dreams — are well — but Waking's better	F21.03.010	1935	2.077	7.068	450	449
Dreams are the subtle Dower		1945	1.478		1376	1401
Dropped into the Ether Acre	F36.05.018	1914	3.073	5.073	665	286
Drowning is not so pitiful		1896	1.009	1.092	1718	1542
Dust is the only Secret	F08.04.013	1914	4.104	5.106	153	166
Dying at my music!	S07.15.075	1945	1.453		1003	1003
Dying! Dying in the night!	F09.06.018	1945	2.642		158	222
Dying! To be afraid of thee	S07.03.011	1945	1.360		831	946
Each Life Converges to some Centre	F35.03.010	1891	1.035	1.061	680	724
Each Scar I'll keep for Him	S05.06.026	1945	2.607		877	920
Each Second is the last	S05.09.036	1945	1.343		879	927
Each that we lose takes part of us;		1896	4.015	4.097	1605	1634
Eden is that old-fashioned House		1914	4.106	5.108	1657	1734
Elijah's Wagon knew no thill		1914	4.095	5.095	1254	1288
Elizabeth told Essex		1945	1.235		1321	1336
Elysium is as far as to		1890	2.004	3.004	1760	1590
Embarrassment of one another	S06b.01.002	1945	1.485		662	1057
Empty my Heart, of Thee	F19.06.015	1929	6.146	6.131	587	393
Endanger it, and the Demand					1658	1688
Ended, ere it begun	S07.25.123				1088	1048
Endow the Living — with the Tears	F30.02.006	1945	1.368		521	657
Escape is such a thankful Word		1945	1.220		1347	1364
Escaping backward to perceive	S07.07.036	1945	1.221		867	969
Essential Oils — are wrung	F34.06.018	1891	4.025	4.065	675	772
Estranged from Beauty — none can be		1945	1.446		1474	1515
Except the Heaven had come so near	F33.01.003	1891	1.031	1.057	472	702
Except the smaller size	F26.06.018	1914	1.003	5.003	1067	606
Except to Heaven, she is nought.	F08.05.016	1890	4.030	4.030	154	173
Exhilaration — is within	F31.05.016	1935	1.021	7.019	383	645
Exhilaration is the Breeze		1914	1.011	5.011	1118	1157
Expanse cannot be lost					1584	1625
Expectation — is Contentment	F38.06.020	1929	1.031	6.028	807	865
Experience is the Angled Road	S05.01.001	1929	1.018	6.016	910	899
Experiment escorts us last		1945	1.573		1770	1181
Experiment to me	S06b.08.029	1891	1.028	1.054	1073	1081
Extol thee — could I? Then I will		1945	1.322		1643	1682
Exultation is the going	F06.02.008	1890	4.007	4.007	76	143
Facts by our side are never sudden		1945	1.508*		1497	1530
Fairer through Fading — as the Day	S02.01.003	1945	1.038		938	868
Faith — is the Pierless Bridge	S07.10.047	1929	5.129	6.116	915	978
Faith is a fine invention	F10.02.009*	1891	1.030	1.056	185	202
Faithful to the end Amended		1945	1.516		1357	1386
Falsehood of Thee could I suppose	S07.15.079	1945	1.269		1007	1007
Fame is a bee.					1763	1788
Fame is a fickle food		1914	1.004	5.004	1659	1702
Fame is the one that does not stay		1945	1.457		1475	1507
Fame is the tint that Scholars leave	S07.07.035	1945	1.459		866	968
Fame of Myself, to justify	F23.01.003	1945	1.461		713	481
Fame's Boys and Girls, who never die		1945	2.636		1066	892
Far from Love the Heavenly Father	S07.21.107	1896	4.056	4.138	1021	1032
Fate slew Him, but He did not drop	S06b.08.032	1896	1.031	1.114	1031	1084
Ferocious as a Bee without a wing						1492
Few, yet enough		1896	1.021	1.104	1596	1639
Finding is the first Act	S05.03.014	1945	1.208		870	910
Finite — to fail, but infinite to Venture	S07.04.017	1896	1.032	1.115	847	952
Fitter to see Him, I may be	F40.05.016			6.000	968	834
Flees so the phantom meadow	F01.01.007	1945	2.638		20	27
Floss won't save you from an Abyss		1945	1.572		1322	1335
Flowers — Well — if anybody	F04.01.004	1945	1.080		137	95
Fly - fly - but as you fly						1244
Follow wise Orion		1914	2.069	5.069	1538	1569
For Death — or rather	F31.04.015	1914	3.072	5.072	382	644
For each ecstatic instant	F05.04.025	1891	1.011	1.037	125	109
For every Bird a Nest	F04.03.011	1929	3.079	6.071	143	86
For largest Woman's Hearth I knew	F28.06.020				309	542
For this — accepted Breath	F09.05.016	1935	1.027	7.025	195	230
Forbidden Fruit a flavor has		1896	1.004	1.087	1377	1482
Forever — is composed of Nows	F32.03.011	1929	1.025	6.022	624	690
Forever at His side to walk	F11.06.013	1929	6.148	6.133	246	264
Forever honored by the Tree		1914	2.062	5.062	1570	1600
Forget! The lady with the Amulet	F29.05.016	1935	3.103	7.089	438	625
Fortitude incarnate		1945	1.345		1217	1255
Four Trees — upon a solitary Acre	F37.02.006	1945	1.142		742	778
Frequently the woods are pink -	F01.01.004	1891	3.036	2.036	6	24
Frigid and sweet Her parting Face	S10.01.003	1945	1.361		1318	1231
From all the Jails the Boys and Girls		1896	1.020	1.103	1532	1553
From Blank to Blank	F23.02.006	1929	6.182	6.165	761	484
From Cocoon forth a Butterfly	F29.01.001	1891	3.007	2.007	354	610
From his slim Palace in the Dust		1945	1.134		1300	1339
From Us She wandered now a Year	S06a.03.010	1896	4.027	4.109	890	794
Funny — to be a Century	S01.02.005	1929	1.007	6.005	345	677
Further in Summer than the Birds		1891	3.044	2.044	1068	895
Garland for Queens, may be	F01.04.026	1945	1.084		34	10
Gathered into the Earth		1945	1.378		1370	1398
Give little Anguish	F14.06.018			5.142	310	422
Given in Marriage unto Thee	S05.03.015	1896	4.007	4.089	817	818
Glass was the Street — in tinsel Peril		1945	1.073		1498	1518
Glee — The great storm is over	F32.02.006	1890	1.005	1.005	619	685
Glory is that bright tragic thing		1914	1.020	5.020	1660	1700
Glowing is her Bonnet	F05.04.022	1914	2.061	5.061	72	106
Go not too near a House of Rose					1434	1479
Go slow, my soul, to feed thyself					1297	1322
Go tell it — What a Message		1945	1.530		1554	1584
Go thy great way!					1638	1673
Go travelling with us!					1513	1561
God gave a Loaf to every Bird	F36.04.013	1891	1.027	1.053	791	748
God is a distant — stately Lover	F29.02.006	1929	A.198		357	615
God is indeed a jealous God		1945	1.584		1719	1752
God made a little Gentian	F24.04.015	1891	3.048	2.048	442	520
God made no act without a cause					1163	1192
God permits industrious Angels	F10.01.002	1890	4.018	4.018	231	245
Going to Heaven!	F06.04.016	1891	4.002	4.042	79	128
Going to Him! Happy letter!		1891	2.005	3.023	494	277
Good Morning — Midnight	F19.02.004	1929	6.164	6.146	425	382
Good Night! Which put the Candle out?	F13.04.012*	1891	1.039	1.065	259	322
Good night, because we must	F05.02.008	1945	1.400		114	97
Good to hide, and hear 'em hunt!	S07.02.010	1945	1.164		842	945
Gratitude — is not the mention	S06a.04.017				989	1120
Great Caesar! Condescend	F07.01.005				102	149
Great Streets of silence led away		1891	4.037	4.077	1159	1166
Grief is a Mouse	F36.06.020	1945	1.493		793	753
Growth of Man — like Growth of Nature	F37.06.018	1929	1.016	6.014	750	790
Guest am I to have					1661	1717
Had I known that the first was the last		1945	1.200		1720	1753
Had I not seen the Sun		1945	1.207		1233	1249
Had I not This, or This, I said	F40.03.010	1935	2.072	7.063	904	828
Had I presumed to hope	F31.02.005	1929	5.120	6.107	522	634
Had this one Day not been.		1914	5.131	5.133	1253	1281
Had we known the Ton she bore		1945	1.250		1124	1185
Had we our senses		1945	1.054		1284	1310
Have any like Myself	F35.03.009	1935	2.048	7.040	736	723
Have you got a Brook in your little heart	F04.01.003	1890	2.009	3.009	136	94
He ate and drank the precious Words		1890	1.021	1.021	1587	1593
He forgot — and I — remembered	F09.07.025	1945	1.295		203	232
He fought like those Who've nought to lose	F23.01.002	1935	1.006	7.004	759	480
He found my Being — set it up	F24.02.006	1945	1.279		603	511
He fumbles at your Soul	F22.06.022	1896	2.012	3.046	315	477
He gave away his Life	F28.02.006	1935	1.008	7.006	567	530
He is alive, this morning					1160	1173
He lived the Life of Ambush		1945	1.377		1525	1571
He outstripped Time with but a Bout	S06a.01.004	1945	1.243		865	1111
He parts Himself — like Leaves	F30.01.003	1935	2.056	7.047	517	655
He preached upon Breadth till it argued him narrow		1891	1.038	1.064	1207	1266
He put the Belt around my life	F12.06.021	1891	2.014	3.032	273	330
He scanned it — staggered	S07.13.065	1945	1.346		1062	994
He strained my faith	F18.02.005	1945	2.608		497	366
He told a homely tale	F23.03.008	1945	1.162		763	486
He touched me, so I live to know	F17.02.003	1896	2.018	3.052	506	349
He was my host — he was my guest		1945	1.281		1721	1754
He was weak, and I was strong — then	F09.03.010	1945	1.263		190	221
He went by sleep that drowsy route					1662	1711
He who in Himself believes	F40.05.017	1945	1.460		969	835
Heart! We will forget him!	F02.05.023	1896	2.013	3.047	47	64
Heart, not so heavy as mine	F04.02.006	1891	1.046	1.072	83	88
Heaven — is what I cannot reach!	F14.02.008	1896	1.005	1.088	239	310
Heaven has different Signs — to me	F28.07.022	1929	3.055	6.047	575	544
Heaven is so far of the Mind	F20.05.018	1929	4.108	6.097	370	413
Heavenly Father — take to thee		1914	4.101	5.102	1461	1500
Her — last Poems	F26.04.012	1914	3.087	5.087	312	600
Her breast is fit for pearls	F05.03.019				84	121
Her face was in a bed of hair		1945	1.245		1722	1755
Her final Summer was it	F38.01.002	1891	4.028	4.068	795	847
Her Grace is all she has	S07.04.021	1914	5.127	5.129	810	956
Her little Parasol to lift	S07.11.056	1945	2.651		1038	987
Her Losses make our Gains ashamed					1562	1602
Her smile was shaped like other smiles	F12.08.026	1935	4.123	7.106	514	335
Her sovereign People					1139	893
Her spirit rose to such a height					1486	1527
Her Sweet turn to leave the Homestead	F34.02.004	1935	4.127	7.110	649	759
Her sweet Weight on my Heart a Night	F29.01.002	1945	1.482		518	611
Here, where the Daisies fit my Head	S07.11.054	1945	1.087		1037	985
Herein a Blossom lies	S06b.06.021	1945	1.086		899	1073
High from the earth I heard a bird		1896	3.012	2.094	1723	1778
His Bill an Auger is	S07.12.060	1896	3.018	2.100	1034	990
His Bill is clasped — his Eye forsook		1945	1.118		1102	1126
His Cheek is his Biographer		1914	4.100	5.101	1460	1499
His Feet are shod with Gauze	S07.10.048				916	979
His Heart was darker than the starless night		1945	1.241		1378	1402
His little Hearse like Figure					1522	1547
His Mansion in the Pool		1945	1.102		1379	1355
His Mind like Fabrics of the East		1945	1.240		1446	1471
His mind of man, a secret makes		1914	1.022	5.022	1663	1730
His oriental heresies		1945	1.129		1526	1562
His voice decrepit was with Joy		1945	1.248		1476	1508
Hope is a strange invention					1392	1424
Hope is a subtle Glutton		1896	1.003	1.086	1547	1493
Hope is the thing with feathers	F13.02.004	1891	1.006	1.032	254	314
Houses — so the Wise Men tell me	F06.01.004	1945	1.414		127	139
How brittle are the Piers					1433	1459
How dare the robins sing		1896	4.012	4.094	1724	1782
How destitute is he		1914	5.120	5.122	1477	1509
How far is it to Heaven?	S07.06.031	1945	1.415		929	965
How firm Eternity must look		1945	1.410		1499	1397
How fits his Umber Coat		1945	1.144		1371	1414
How fleet — how indiscreet an one		1945	1.569		1771	1557
How fortunate the Grave	S06b.07.027	1945	1.391		897	1079
How good his Lava Bed		1945	1.006		1447	1472
How happy I was if I could forget	S06b.07.028	1945	1.201		898	1080
How happy is the little Stone		1891	3.033	2.033	1510	1570
How Human Nature dotes		1945	1.525		1417	1440
How know it from a Summer's Day?					1364	1412
How lonesome the Wind must feel Nights		1945	1.047		1418	1441
How many Flowers fail in Wood	F28.04.011	1929	3.082	6.074	404	534
How many schemes may die		1945	1.565		1150	1326
How many times these low feet staggered	F09.01.002	1890	4.011	4.011	187	238
How much of Source escapes with thee					1517	1567
How much the present moment means		1945	1.520		1380	1420
How News must feel when travelling	S14.03.008	1945	1.587		1319	1379
How noteless Men, and Pleiads, stand	F16.03.007	1929	4.090	6.080	282	342
How ruthless are the gentle		1945	1.554		1439	1465
How sick — to wait — in any place — but thine	F20.05.015	1945	1.290		368	410
How slow the Wind					1571	1607
How soft a Caterpillar steps		1945	2.603		1448	1523
How soft this Prison is					1334	1352
How still the Bells in Steeples stand	S07.15.080	1896	1.010	1.093	1008	1008
How the old Mountains drip with Sunset	F13.06.017	1896	3.028	2.110	291	327
How the Waters closed above Him	S07.01.006	1945	1.344		923	941
How well I knew Her not	S05.06.027				837	813
I am afraid to own a Body	S07.26.125	1935	1.019	7.017	1090	1050
I am alive — I guess	F26.05.017	1945	1.254		470	605
I am ashamed — I hide	F33.02.006	1929	6.158	6.142	473	705
I asked no other thing	F32.02.008	1890	1.012	1.012	621	687
I bet with every Wind that blew		1914	1.030	5.030	1215	1167
I breathed enough to take the Trick	F14.02.006	1896	4.041	4.123	272	308
I bring an unaccustomed wine	F06.04.014	1891	1.002	1.028	132	126
I Came to buy a smile — today	F11.02.005	1929	6.140	6.125	223	258
I can wade Grief	F13.01.002	1891	1.009	1.035	252	312
I can't tell you — but you feel it	F07.04.020	1914	2.039	5.039	65	164
I cannot be ashamed	S07.09.046	1929	6.144	6.129	914	977
I cannot buy it — 'tis not sold	S07.02.008	1945	1.188		840	943
I cannot dance upon my Toes	F19.01.003	1929	1.008	6.006	326	381
I cannot live with You	F33.03.007	1890	2.012	3.012	640	706
I cannot meet the Spring unmoved		1945	1.053		1051	1122
I cannot see my soul but know 'tis there					1262	1276
I cannot want it more	S09.01.002	1945	1.205		1301	1228
I cautious, scanned my little life	F08.05.018	1929	1.019	6.017	178	175
I could bring You Jewels — had I a mind to	F35.04.012	1945	2.652		697	726
I could die — to know	F28.05.014	1935	3.104	7.090	570	537
I could not drink it, Sweet	S05.06.029				818	816
I could not prove the Years had feet	S01.01.002	1945	1.211		563	674
I could suffice for Him, I knew	F33.06.015	1935	3.095	7.082	643	712
I cried at Pity — not at Pain	F19.06.016	1896	4.028*	4.110	588	394
I cross till I am weary	F30.05.015	1935	3.109	7.094	550	666
I did not reach Thee		1914	5.142	5.146	1664	1708
I died for Beauty — but was scarce	F21.03.009	1890	4.010	4.010	449	448
I do not care - why should I care						1534
I dreaded that first Robin, so	F17.01.001	1891	3.014	2.014	348	347
I dwell in Possibility	F22.04.011	1929	1.030	6.027	657	466
I envy Seas, whereon He rides	F18.03.007	1896	2.021	3.055	498	368
I fear a Man of frugal Speech	F30.04.012	1929	1.003	6.001	543	663
I felt a Cleaving in my Mind	S02.01.002	1896	1.023	1.106	937	867
I felt a Funeral, in my Brain	F16.02.005	1896	4.030	4.112	280	340
I felt my life with both my hands	F17.05.011	1945	1.265		351	357
I fit for them		1914	3.082	5.082	1109	1129
I found the words to every thought	F15.05.014	1891	1.005	1.031	581	436
I gained it so	F31.03.010	1891	1.051	1.077	359	639
I gave myself to Him	F15.02.004	1891	2.004	3.022	580	426
I got so I could take his name	F12.02.008	1929	6.183	6.166	293	292
I groped for him before I knew		1945	1.320		1555	1585
I had a daily Bliss	S07.21.104	1896	1.037	1.120	1057	1029
I had a guinea golden	F01.02.012	1896	1.019	1.102	23	12
I had been hungry, all the Years	F15.06.017	1891	1.050	1.076	579	439
I had no Cause to be awake	F30.04.011	1891	4.020	4.060	542	662
I had no time to Hate	F34.03.008	1890	1.022	1.022	478	763
I had not minded — Walls	F27.03.008	1929	6.166	6.148	398	554
I had some things that I called mine	F05.02.012	1945	1.096		116	101
I had the Glory — that will do	F17.02.004	1945	1.209		349	350
I have a Bird in spring					5	4
I have a King, who does not speak	F07.02.006	1896	1.034	1.117	103	157
I have never seen Volcanoes	F08.04.012	1945	1.495		175	165
I have no Life but this		1891	2.002	3.020	1398	1432
I haven't told my garden yet	F03.03.017	1891	4.008	4.048	50	40
I heard a Fly buzz — when I died	F26.01.003	1896	4.046	4.128	465	591
I heard, as if I had no Ear	S07.14.067	1945	1.230		1039	996
I held a Jewel in my fingers	F11.04.008	1891	2.015	3.033	245	261
I held it so tight that I lost it						1659
I hide myself within my flower	F03.02.014*	1890	2.007	3.007	903	80
I keep my pledge.	F02.05.022	1945	2.653		46	63
I knew that I had gained	S07.22.108	1945	1.212		1022	1033
I know a place where Summer strives	F18.01.002	1891	3.028	2.028	337	363
I know lives, I could miss	F25.02.006	1929	6.163	6.145	372	574
I know of people in the Grave					1665	1704
I know some lonely Houses off the Road	F13.01.001	1890	1.015	1.015	289	311
I know Suspense — it steps so terse		1945	1.582		1285	1283
I know that He exists.	F18.02.004	1891	1.055	1.081	338	365
I know where Wells grow — Droughtless Wells	F32.05.016	1935	2.053	7.044	460	695
I learned — at least — what Home could be	S03.01.002	1945	1.280		944	891
I like a look of Agony	F16.02.004	1890	4.012	4.012	241	339
I like to see it lap the Miles	F19.02.005	1891	1.017	1.043	585	383
I live with Him — I see His face	F32.06.020	1896	2.020	3.054	463	698
I lived on Dread	F23.06.020	1891	4.026	4.066	770	498
I lost a World — the other day!	F12.01.003	1890	4.036	4.036	181	209
I made slow Riches but my Gain	S07.03.012	1945	1.187		843	947
I make His Crescent fill or lack	F40.06.019	1929	6.139	6.124	909	837
I many times thought Peace had come	F35.08.026	1891	1.047	1.073	739	737
I meant to find Her when I came	F39.04.012	1896	4.031	4.113	718	881
I meant to have but modest needs	F33.05.013*	1891	1.013	1.039	476	711
I measure every Grief I meet	F27.02.004	1896	1.033	1.116	561	550
I met a King this afternoon!	F08.01.003	1945	1.156		166	183
I never felt at Home — Below	F15.06.015	1929	2.043	6.037	413	437
I never hear that one is dead		1945	1.598		1323	1325
I never hear the word escape	F06.02.009	1891	1.010	1.036	77	144
I never lost as much but twice	F03.03.016	1890	4.040	4.040	49	39
I never saw a Moor		1890	4.017	4.017	1052	800
I never told the buried gold	F03.03.015	1914	2.045	5.045	11	38
I noticed People disappeared		1891	4.019	4.059	1149	1154
I often passed the village	F03.03.018	1945	2.643		51	41
I pay — in Satin Cash	F28.01.002	1929	3.070	6.062	402	526
I play at Riches — to appease	F38.04.011	1935	2.068	7.059	801	856
I prayed, at first, a little Girl	F28.07.024	1929	2.045	6.039	576	546
I read my sentence — steadily	F15.04.010	1891	4.007	4.047	412	432
I reason, Earth is short	F20.02.008	1890	4.023	4.023	301	403
I reckon — when I count it all	F28.04.010	1929	1.011	6.009	569	533
I robbed the Woods	F02.04.016	1891	3.017	2.017	41	57
I rose — because He sank	F21.05.016	1929	4.093	6.149	616	454
I saw no Way — The Heavens were stitched	F31.01.004	1935	1.023	7.021	378	633
I saw that the Flake was on it					1267	1304
I saw the wind within her					1502	1531
I see thee better — in the Dark	F21.02.003	1914	3.079	5.079	611	442
I see thee clearer for the Grave					1666	1695
I send Two Sunsets	F27.04.011	1914	2.055	5.055	308	557
I send you a decrepit flower		1945	1.094		1324	1346
I shall keep singing!	F11.08.019	1935	2.032	7.027	250	270
I shall know why — when Time is over	F09.04.013	1890	4.039	4.039	193	215
I shall not murmur if at last		1945	2.641		1410	1429
I should have been too glad, I see	F33.05.012	1891	1.024	1.050	313	283
I should not dare to be so sad	S10.02.005	1929	5.132	6.119	1197	1233
I should not dare to leave my friend	F09.07.027	1891	4.036	4.076	205	234
I showed her Heights she never saw	F16.05.012	1914	5.124	5.126	446	346
I sing to use the Waiting	S07.04.020	1896	4.032	4.114	850	955
I sometimes drop it, for a Quick	F37.04.012	1935	2.079	7.070	708	784
I started Early — Took my Dog	F30.02.004	1891	3.019	2.019	520	656
I stepped from Plank to Plank	S05.08.035	1896	1.053	1.136	875	926
I stole them from a Bee	F09.06.022				200	226
I sued the News — yet feared — the News					1360	1391
I suppose the time will come		1945	1.051		1381	1389
I taste a liquor never brewed	F12.01.001	1890	1.020	1.020	214	207
I tend my flowers for thee	F18.02.006	1929	6.141	6.126	339	367
I think I was enchanted	F29.06.018	1935	2.039	7.033	593	627
I think just how my shape will rise	F10.05.021	1891	4.040	4.080	237	252
I think that the Root of the Wind is Water		1914	2.051	5.051	1302	1295
I think the Hemlock likes to stand	F20.02.005	1890	3.030	2.081	525	400
I think the longest Hour of all	F26.06.019	1945	1.182		635	607
I think to Live — may be a Bliss	F34.01.002	1935	3.085	7.074	646	757
I thought that nature was enough		1945	1.149		1286	1269
I thought the Train would never come		1945	1.258		1449	1473
I tie my Hat — I crease my Shawl	F24.05.018*	1929	6.180	6.163	443	522
I took my Power in my Hand	F30.03.009	1891	1.033	1.059	540	660
I took one Draught of Life	F20.01.001	1929	6.135	6.120	1725	396
I tried to think a lonelier Thing	F25.01.002	1945	1.186		532	570
I want — it pleaded — All its life	F38.02.006	1945	1.399		731	851
I was a Phoebe — nothing more	S07.16.081	1945	1.112		1009	1009
I was the slightest in the House	F22.05.018	1945	1.179		486	473
I watched her face to see which way		1914	3.077	5.077	1667	1710
I watched the Moon around the House	F26.02.005	1945	1.044		629	593
I went to Heaven	F25.03.009	1891	4.014*	4.054	374	577
I went to thank Her	F31.02.008	1890	4.014	4.014	363	637
I worked for chaff and earning Wheat	S08b.01.001	1896	1.038	1.121	1269	1217
I would distil a cup					16	A13-8
I would not paint — a picture	F17.01.002	1945	0.000		505	348
I Years had been from Home	F21.01.001	1891	1.053	1.079	609	440
I'd rather recollect a setting		1945	1.591		1349	1366
I'll clutch — and clutch	F19.03.007	1945	1.197		427	385
I'll send the feather from my Hat!					687	196
I'll tell you how the Sun rose	F10.03.011	1890	3.022	2.073	318	204
I'm ceded — I've stopped being Theirs	F17.03.007	1890	2.014	3.014	508	353
I'm Nobody! Who are you?	F11.04.007	1891	1.001	1.027	288	260
I'm saying every day	F25.03.007	1935	2.035	7.030	373	575
I'm sorry for the Dead — Today	F25.05.014	1896	4.042*	4.124	529	582
I'm the little Heart's Ease!	F08.04.014	1929	3.069	6.061	176	167
I'm wife — I've finished that	F09.06.021	1890	2.016	3.016	199	225
I've dropped my Brain — My Soul is numb	S06b.09.036	1945	1.301		1046	1088
I've got an arrow here.	F02.04.015	1896	2.011	3.045	1729	56
I've heard an Organ talk, sometimes	F12.01.005	1935	2.038	7.032	183	211
I've known a Heaven, like a Tent	F11.01.004	1929	1.034	6.031	243	257
I've none to tell me to but Thee	S05.09.038	1945	1.277		881	929
I've nothing else — to bring, You know	F10.05.022	1929	3.068	6.060	224	253
I've seen a Dying Eye	F31.05.019	1890	4.015	4.015	547	648
Ideals are the Fairly Oil	S07.18.091	1945	1.443		983	1016
If all the griefs I am to have		1945	1.191		1726	1756
If any sink, assure that this, now standing	F29.02.007	1935	1.010	7.008	358	616
If anybody's friend be dead	F17.03.008	1891	4.021	4.061	509	354
If Blame be my side — forfeit Me	F39.02.005	1945	1.299		775	874
If ever the lid gets off my head	F25.06.017	1945	1.437		1727	585
If He dissolve — then	F10.05.020	1935	3.108	7.093	236	251
If He were living — dare I ask	F35.02.005	1929	6.173	6.156	734	719
If I can stop one Heart from breaking	S07.10.051	1890	1.006	1.006	919	982
If I could bribe them by a Rose	F08.05.019	1935	4.114	7.097	179	176
If I could tell how glad I was		1914	5.126	5.128	1668	1725
If I may have it, when it's dead	F15.04.009	1896	4.044	4.126	577	431
If I should cease to bring a Rose	F02.02.010	1945	2.000		56	53
If I should die	F03.04.023	1891	4.027	4.067	54	36
If I should see a single bird						1591
If I shouldn't be alive	F12.01.004	1890	4.037	4.037	182	210
If I'm lost — now	F13.02.006	1945	1.304		256	316
If it had no pencil		1945	2.654		921	184
If my Bark sink		1945	1.430		1234	1250
If Nature smiles — the Mother must	S06c.04.014	1929	3.063	6.055	1085	1101
If pain for peace prepares	F07.03.016	1914	3.081	5.081	63	155
If recollecting were forgetting	F01.04.024	1896	1.025	1.108	33	9
If she had been the Mistletoe	F02.04.019				44	60
If the foolish, call them flowers	F08.02.005	1896	1.011	1.094	168	179
If this is fading	F05.03.017	1945	2.640		120	119
If those I loved were lost	F01.03.020	1945	1.215		29	20
If What we could — were what we would	F28.05.017	1914	1.013	5.013	407	540
If wrecked upon the Shoal of Thought		1945	1.534		1469	1503
If you were coming in the Fall	F17.04.010	1890	2.006	3.006	511	356
If your Nerve, deny you	F13.06.019	1935	1.012	7.010	292	329
Image of Light, Adieu		1945	1.428		1556	1586
Immortal is an ample word	S08b.07.007	1896	4.021	4.103	1205	1223
Immured in Heaven!		1914	3.088	5.088	1594	1628
Impossibility, like Wine	S07.01.004	1945	1.550		838	939
In Ebon Box, when years have flown	F08.02.006	1935	2.067	7.058	169	180
In falling Timbers buried	F21.03.008	1945	1.348		614	447
In lands I never saw — they say	F05.04.024	1891	2.012	3.030	124	108
In many and reportless places		1945	1.498		1382	1404
In rags mysterious as these	F05.02.013	1945	1.558		117	102
In snow thou comest					1669	1714
In the name of the bee	F01.01.003	1891	3.047	2.047	18	23
In this short Life		1945	1.521		1287	1292
In thy long Paradise of Light		1945	1.226		1145	1145
In Winter in my Room		1914	2.070	5.070	1670	1742
Inconceivably solemn!	F14.04.010	1929	5.131	6.118	582	414
Incredible the Lodging						1452
Is Bliss then, such Abyss	F18.04.010	1896	1.052	1.135	340	371
Is Heaven a Physician?		1891	1.021	1.047	1270	1260
Is Immortality a bane		1945	2.630		1728	1757
Is it dead — Find it	F15.05.012	1929	4.096	6.085	417	434
Is it too late to touch you, Dear?					1637	1674
Is it true, dear Sue?					218	189
It always felt to me — a wrong	F24.05.017	1929	2.046	6.040	597	521
It bloomed and dropt, a Single Noon	S04b.01.001	1945	2.602		978	843
It came at last but prompter Death	S08b.05.005	1945	1.330		1230	1221
It came his turn to beg		1945	1.317		1500	1519
It can't be Summer!	F11.06.014	1891	3.046	2.046	221	265
It ceased to hurt me, though so slow	F14.06.017	1929	6.189	6.171	584	421
It did not surprise me	F02.02.007	1945	1.199		39	50
It don't sound so terrible — quite — as it did	F19.02.006	1945	2.614		426	384
It dropped so low — in my Regard	F37.04.013	1896	1.035	1.118	747	785
It feels a shame to be Alive	F24.07.022	1929	4.094	6.083	444	524
It is a lonesome Glee	F39.02.004	1945	1.103		774	873
It is an honorable Thought	S06a.02.008	1896	4.010	4.092	946	1115
It is easy to work when the soul is at play	F11.05.009	1945	1.476		244	242
It is the Meek that Valor wear						1252
It knew no lapse, nor Diminuation —	F27.06.022	1945	1.376		560	568
It knew no Medicine	F27.06.021	1935	4.122	7.105	559	567
It makes no difference abroad	F32.02.007	1890	3.020	2.071	620	686
It might be lonelier	F28.04.012	1896	1.049*	1.132	405	535
It rises — passes — on our South	S07.22.109	1945	1.041		1023	1034
It sifts from Leaden Sieves	F24.01.001	1891	3.050*	2.050	311	291
It sounded as if the Streets were running		1891	3.034	2.034	1397	1454
It stole along so stealthy					1457	1497
It struck me — every Day	F31.02.007	1896	4.050	4.132	362	636
It tossed — and tossed	F36.03.011	1891	1.025	1.051	723	746
It troubled me as once I was	F24.03.011	1945	1.150		600	516
It was a Grave, yet bore no Stone	F38.03.007*	1935	4.136	7.118	876	852
It was a quiet seeming Day		1945	1.018		1419	1442
It was a quiet way	F25.02.005	1929	6.137	6.122	1053	573
It was given to me by the Gods	F21.05.017*	1945	1.151		454	455
It was not Death, for I stood up	F17.04.009	1891	4.035	4.075	510	355
It was not Saint — it was too large	S07.26.127	1929	5.121	6.108	1092	1052
It was too late for Man	F32.03.010	1890	4.032	4.032	623	689
It will be Summer — eventually.	F18.06.014	1896	3.001*	2.083	342	374
It would have starved a Gnat	F21.02.005	1945	1.177		612	444
It would never be Common — more — I said	F19.04.010	1935	3.098	7.085	430	388
It would not know if it were spurned		1945	2.655		1579	1615
It's all I have to bring today	F01.03.017	1896	0.000	3.000	26	17
It's coming — the postponeless Creature	F27.04.010	1929	4.110	6.099	390	556
It's easy to invent a Life	F36.04.012	1929	2.041	6.035	724	747
It's like the Light	F12.05.019	1896	3.016	2.098	297	302
It's such a little thing to weep	F09.03.009	1896	1.008	1.091	189	220
It's thoughts — and just One Heart	F18.01.001	1935	2.033	7.028	495	362
Its Hour with itself	S08a.07.007	1929	5.124	6.111	1225	1211
Its little Ether Hood		1945	1.140		1501	1490
Jesus! thy Crucifix	F12.03.015	1945	1.229		225	197
Joy to have merited the Pain	F36.01.002	1929	6.178	6.161	788	739
Judgment is justest					1671	1707
Just as He spoke it from his Hands	S07.04.018	1945	1.458		848	953
Just lost, when I was saved!	F10.03.013	1891	1.057	1.083	160	132
Just Once! Oh least Request!	F22.06.023	1929	A.202	A.005	1076	478
Just so — Jesus — raps	F11.06.012	1914	5.134	5.137	317	263
Kill your Balm — and its Odors bless you	F14.02.007	1945	1.586		238	309
Knock with tremor		1945	1.390		1325	1333
Knows how to forget!	F19.05.013*	1945	1.210*		433	391
Lad of Athens, faithful be					1768	1606
Lain in Nature — so suffice us		1945	1.387		1288	1309
Lay this Laurel on the One		1891	4.042	4.082	1393	1428
Least Bee that brew	F39.03.009	1945	1.128		676	878
Least Rivers — docile to some sea	F10.03.015	1945	2.656		212	206
Left in immortal Youth		1945	1.382		1289	1289
Lest any doubt that we are glad that they were born Today					1156	1191
Lest they should come — is all my fear		1945	2.632		1169	1204
Lest this be Heaven indeed	S07.14.071	1945	1.501		1043	1000
Let down the Bars, Oh Death	S06a.04.013	1891	4.001	4.041	1065	1117
Let me not mar that perfect Dream		1896	2.019*	3.053	1335	1361
Let me not thirst with this Hock at my Lip		1945	2.626		1772	excluded
Let my first Knowing be of thee		1945	1.264		1218	1254
Let others - show this Surry's Grace						290
Let Us play Yesterday	F36.06.021	1935	3.105	7.091	728	754
Lethe in my flower	F02.04.013	1945	2.657		1730	54
Life — is what we make of it	F35.04.013	1929	4.106	6.095	698	727
Life is death we're lengthy at						502
Life, and Death, and Giants	F37.02.005	1896	1.039	1.122	706	777
Lift it — with the Feathers		1945	1.450		1348	1362
Light is sufficient to itself	S05.02.008	1945	1.012		862	506
Lightly stepped a yellow star		1914	2.058	5.058	1672	1698
Like Brooms of Steel		1914	2.067	5.067	1252	1241
Like eyes that looked on Wastes	F32.04.014	1945	1.198		458	693
Like Flowers, that heard the news of Dews	F17.06.015				513	361
Like her the Saints retire	F07.03.011				60	150
Like Men and Women Shadows walk	S07.06.030	1914	2.041	5.041	1105	964
Like Mighty Foot Lights — burned the Red	F24.01.002	1891	3.041	2.041	595	507
Like Rain it sounded till it curved		1945	1.022		1235	1245
Like Some Old fashioned Miracle	F20.04.013	1914	2.060	5.060	302	408
Like Time's insidious wrinkle		1945	1.099		1236	1264
Like Trains of Cars on Tracks of Plush	S08a.09.009	1890	3.014	2.065	1224	1213
Lives he in any other world		1945	1.315		1557	1587
Long Years apart — can make no		1945	1.326		1383	1405
Longing is like the Seed		1929	6.171	6.154	1255	1298
Look back on Time, with kindly eyes		1890	4.008	4.008	1478	1251
Love — is anterior to Life	S07.10.049	1896	2.003	3.037	917	980
Love — is that later Thing than Death	S04a.01.001	1945	1.570		924	840
Love — thou art high	F21.04.014	1929	6.145	6.130	453	452
Love can do all but raise the Dead		1945	1.571		1731	1758
Love is done when Love's begun					1485	1526
Love reckons by itself — alone		1914	5.114	5.116	826	812
Love's stricken why					1368	1392
Low at my problem bending	F05.02.010	1914	3.080	5.080	69	99
Luck is not chance		1945	1.566		1350	1360
Make me a picture of the sun	F09.01.003	1945	1.173		188	239
Mama never forgets her birds		1945	1.168		164	130
Many a phrase has the English language	F12.07.024	1935	3.089	7.077	276	333
Many cross the Rhine	F05.04.023	1945	2.658		123	107
March is the Month of Expectation.		1914	2.048	5.048	1404	1422
Me — come! My dazzled face	F19.04.011	1896	4.026	4.108	431	389
Me from Myself — to banish	F33.04.010	1929	5.123	6.110	642	709
Me prove it now — Whoever doubt	F31.01.002	1935	3.110	7.095	537	631
Me, change! Me, alter!		1945	1.268		268	281
Meeting by Accident		1945	1.288		1548	1578
Midsummer, was it, when They died	F40.01.003	1929	4.097	6.086	962	822
Mine — by the Right of the White Election!	F20.05.016	1890	2.001	3.001	528	411
Mine Enemy is growing old		1891	1.042	1.068	1509	1539
More Life — went out — when He went	F14.04.011	1935	1.004	7.002	422	415
More than the Grave is closed to me		1945	1.385		1503	1532
Morning — is the place for Dew	F09.06.019	1896	3.009	2.091	197	223
Morning — means Milking — to the Farmer	F30.02.005	1914	2.037	5.037	300	191
Morning is due to all					1577	1621
Morning that comes but once		1945	1.008		1610	1645
Morns like these — we parted	F01.03.018	1891	4.005	4.045	27	18
Most she touched me by her muteness	F23.02.005	1929	3.081	6.073	760	483
Much Madness is divinest Sense	F29.03.011	1890	1.011	1.011	435	620
Musicians wrestle everywhere	F09.05.015	1891	1.056	1.082	157	229
Must be a Woe	F28.05.015	1935	1.025	7.023	571	538
Mute thy Coronation		1945	1.324		151	133
My best Acquaintances are those	S06b.02.008	1945	1.225		932	1062
My Cocoon tightens — Colors tease	S06c.06.020	1890	4.006	4.006	1099	1107
My country need not change her gown		1891	1.029	1.055	1511	1540
My Eye is fuller than my vase	F09.06.024	1945	1.271		202	228
My Faith is larger than the Hills	F23.04.011	1929	3.058	6.050	766	489
My first well Day — since many ill	F28.06.019	1935	2.043	7.036	574	288
My friend attacks my friend!	F05.02.014	1945	1.223		118	103
My friend must be a Bird	F03.01.005	1896	2.017	3.051	92	71
My Garden — like the Beach	F22.04.014	1935	2.059	7.050	484	469
My God — He sees thee					1178	1168
My Heart ran so to thee		1945	1.314		1237	1331
My Heart upon a little Plate	S07.23.114	1945	2.659		1027	1039
My life closed twice before its close		1896	1.013	1.096	1732	1773
My Life had stood — a Loaded Gun	F34.04.009	1929	6.143	6.128	754	764
My Maker — let me be					1403	1463
My nosegays are for Captives	F03.02.008	1891	0.000	2.000	95	74
My period had come for Prayer	F28.01.001	1929	2.047	6.041	564	525
My Portion is Defeat — today	F33.02.005	1929	5.126	6.113	639	704
My Reward for Being, was This.	F18.06.015*	1945	2.619		343	375
My River runs to thee	F09.03.008	1890	2.011	3.011	162	219
My Season's furthest Flower	S07.21.105	1945	2.660		1019	1030
My Soul — accused me — And I quailed	F37.06.021	1929	5.122	6.109	753	793
My Triumph lasted till the Drums	S08a.08.008	1935	1.003	7.001	1227	1212
My Wars are laid away in Books		1945	1.227		1549	1579
My wheel is in the dark!	F02.05.020	1914	1.017	5.017	10	61
My Worthiness is all my Doubt	F37.06.019	1896	2.002	3.036	751	791
Myself can read the Telegrams	S07.25.124	1945	1.183		1089	1049
Myself was formed — a Carpenter	F22.06.020	1935	2.071	7.062	488	475
Nature — sometimes sears a Sapling	F22.01.002	1945	1.474		314	457
Nature — the Gentlest Mother is	F36.02.005	1891	3.001	2.001	790	741
Nature affects to be sedate		1945	1.089		1170	1176
Nature and God — I neither knew	S05.06.024				835	803
Nature assigns the Sun					1336	1371
Nature can do no more					1673	1722
Nature is what we see	F35.02.007	1914	2.034	5.034	668	721
Nature rarer uses Yellow	S06b.09.034	1891	3.031	2.031	1045	1086
Never for Society	F37.04.011	1935	2.037	7.031	746	783
New feet within my garden go	F03.02.013	1890	3.001	2.052	99	79
No Autumn's intercepting Chill		1914	5.116	5.118	1516	1563
No Bobolink — reverse His Singing	F34.04.011	1945	1.109		755	766
No Brigadier throughout the Year		1891	3.051	2.051	1561	1596
No Crowd that has occurred	F30.01.001	1929	4.111	6.100	515	653
No ladder needs the bird but skies					1574	1605
No Life can pompless pass away		1891	4.018	4.058	1626	1594
No Man can compass a Despair	F33.06.017	1935	4.141	7.123	477	714
No man saw awe, nor to his house		1945	1.563		1733	1342
No matter — now — Sweet	F35.06.022*	1945	1.294		704	734
No matter where the Saints abide		1914	5.128	5.130	1541	1576
No Notice gave She, but a Change	F38.05.015	1935	4.124	7.107	804	860
No Other can reduce	F36.01.001*	1914	1.015	5.015	982	738
No Passenger was known to flee		1945	1.537		1406	1451
No Prisoner be	F36.02.006				720	742
No Rack can torture me	F31.06.020	1890	4.035	4.035	384	649
No Romance sold unto	F26.01.002	1914	1.012	5.012	669	590
No Rose, yet felt myself a'bloom						190
Nobody knows this little Rose	F01.04.027	1945	1.083		35	11
None can experience sting	F39.01.001	1945	1.592		771	870
None who saw it ever told it		1945	1.479		1110	1135
Noon — is the Hinge of Day	S06b.02.006	1945	1.013		931	1060
Nor Mountain hinder Me	S07.23.116	1945	1.308		1029	1041
Not all die early, dying young	S05.11.047				990	937
Not any higher stands the Grave	S08a.10.010	1896	4.016	4.098	1256	1214
Not any more to be lacked	S14.04.011	1929	4.092	6.082	1344	1382
Not any sunny tone		1914	3.071	5.071	1674	1738
Not at Home to Callers					1590	1604
Not in this World to see his face	F15.05.013	1890	4.021	4.021	418	435
Not knowing when the Dawn will come		1896	3.007	2.089	1619	1647
Not One by Heaven defrauded stay		1914	3.083	5.083	1303	1296
Not probable — The barest Chance	S01.02.006	1935	3.093	7.080	346	678
Not Revelation — 'tis — that waits					685	500
Not seeing, still we know					1518	1566
Not Sickness stains the Brave					1613	1661
Not so the infinite Relations — Below	S07.14.068	1945	1.419		1040	997
Not that he goes — we love him more					1435	1461
Not that We did, shall be the test	S07.08.040	1929	6.193	6.175	823	972
Not to discover weakness is	S07.17.085	1945	1.551		1054	1011
Not with a Club, the Heart is broken	S12.01.002	1896	2.016	3.050	1304	1349
Now I knew I lost her	S11.02.005	1945	1.202		1219	1274
Now I lay thee down to Sleep					1539	1575
Obtaining but our own Extent					1543	1573
Of all the Souls that stand create		1891	2.001	3.019	664	279
Of all the Sounds despatched abroad	F12.08.025	1890	3.024	2.075	321	334
Of Being is a Bird	F22.03.007	1929	1.020	6.018	653	462
Of Bronze — and Blaze	F13.03.009	1896	3.027	2.109	290	319
Of Brussels — it was not	F24.02.005	1945	2.661		602	510
Of Consciousness, her awful Mate	S06b.07.024	1945	1.596		894	1076
Of Course — I prayed	F25.04.013	1929	2.044	6.038	376	581
Of Death I try to think like this		1945	1.422		1558	1588
Of Glory not a Beam is left					1647	1685
Of God we ask one favor					1601	1675
Of Life to own					1294	1327
Of Nature I shall have enough		1945	1.091		1220	1170
Of nearness to her sundered Things	F16.01.002	1929	4.104	6.093	607	337
Of Paradise' existence		1945	1.424		1411	1421
Of Paul and Silas it is said	S08a.01.001	1945	1.219		1166	1206
Of Silken Speech and Specious Shoe	S06b.07.026	1945	1.125		896	1078
Of so divine a Loss		1914	5.137	5.140	1179	1202
Of the Heart that goes in, and closes the Door	S06c.05.018	1945	1.480		1098	1105
Of their peculiar light					1362	1396
Of this is Day composed		1914	2.056	5.056	1675	1692
Of Tolling Bell I ask the cause?	S05.10.043	1896	4.043	4.125	947	933
Of Tribulation, these are They	F13.06.018	1891	4.039	4.079	325	328
Of whom so dear		1945	1.327		1504	1533
Of Yellow was the outer Sky					1676	1733
Oh Future! thou secreted peace		1945	1.426		1631	1652
Oh give it Motion — deck it sweet		1945	1.358		1527	1550
Oh Shadow on the Grass	S10.03.009	1929	3.084	6.076	1187	1237
Oh Sumptuous moment		1945	1.262		1125	1186
Oh what a Grace is this					1615	1669
Oh, honey of an hour		1945	1.189		1734	1477
On a Columnar Self	F36.02.004	1929	5.128	6.115	789	740
On my volcano grows the Grass		1914	5.125	5.127	1677	1743
On such a night, or such a night	F04.04.016	1891	4.024	4.064	146	84
On that dear Frame the Years had worn	S05.07.032	1945	1.366		940	924
On that specific Pillow		1945	1.593		1533	1554
On the World you colored		1945	1.313		1171	1203
On this long storm the Rainbow rose	F09.04.014	1890	4.005	4.005	194	216
On this wondrous sea	F01.04.025	1896	4.059	4.141	4	3
Once more, my now bewildered Dove	F02.05.024	1945	1.451		48	65
One and One — are One	F23.06.019	1929	6.156	6.140	769	497
One Anguish — in a Crowd	F28.01.003	1945	1.511		565	527
One Blessing had I than the rest	F34.05.012	1896	2.004	3.038	756	767
One crown that no one seeks		1945	1.514		1735	1759
One Crucifixion is recorded — only	F30.06.019	1945	1.513		553	670
One Day is there of the Series	S06a.01.001	1896	1.054	1.137	814	1110
One dignity delays for all	F03.02.011	1890	4.001	4.001	98	77
One Joy of so much anguish		1945	1.107		1420	1450
One Life of so much Consequence!	F10.04.016	1929	6.142	6.127	270	248
One need not be a Chamber — to be Haunted	F20.04.012	1891	4.029	4.069	670	407
One note from One Bird						1478
One of the ones that Midas touched		1891	3.013	2.013	1466	1488
One Sister have I in our house	F02.02.011*	1914	0.000	5.000	14	5
One thing of it we borrow					1464	1516
One Year ago — jots what?	F12.05.018	1945	1.292		296	301
Only a Shrine, but Mine	S07.10.050	1929	6.172	6.155	918	981
Only God — detect the Sorrow	F32.04.013	1935	4.149	7.131	626	692
Opinion is a flitting thing					1455	1495
Our journey had advanced	F21.05.015	1891	4.022	4.062	615	453
Our little Kinsmen — after Rain	S05.10.042	1945	1.101		885	932
Our little secrets slink away		1945	1.560		1326	1318
Our lives are Swiss	F06.04.017	1896	1.040	1.123	80	129
Our own possessions — though our own					1208	1267
Our share of night to bear	F05.01.007	1890	1.002	1.002	113	116
Ourselves we do inter with sweet derision.					1144	1449
Ourselves were wed one summer — dear	F26.03.008	1945	1.194		631	596
Out of sight? What of that?	F35.06.021	1929	3.066	6.058	703	733
Over and over, like a Tune	F20.03.011	1929	4.112	6.101	367	406
Over the fence	F11.08.020	1945	1.161		251	271
Pain — expands the Time	F40.04.015	1929	5.118	6.105	967	833
Pain — has an Element of Blank	F34.02.005	1890	1.019	1.019	650	760
Pain has but one Acquaintance	S06a.04.016	1945	1.351		1049	1119
Papa above!	F07.03.012	1914	4.093	5.093	61	151
Paradise is of the option.		1945	2.629		1069	1125
Paradise is that old mansion		1945	2.616		1119	1144
Partake as doth the Bee	S07.13.064	1945	2.662		994	806
Parting with Thee reluctantly					1614	1667
Pass to they Rendezvous of Light					1564	1624
Patience — has a quiet Outer	S04a.01.003	1945	1.492		926	842
Peace is a fiction of our Faith	S07.08.038	1945	1.553		912	971
Perception of an object costs	S06c.05.016	1914	1.014	5.014	1071	1103
Perhaps I asked too large	F17.05.012	1945	2.613		352	358
Perhaps they do not go so far					1399	1455
Perhaps you think me stooping	S05.02.010				833	273
Perhaps you'd like to buy a flower	F04.01.001	1890	3.004	2.055	134	92
Peril as a Possession		1914	1.006	5.006	1678	1699
Pigmy seraphs — gone astray	F04.01.005	1891	3.011	2.011	138	96
Pink — small — and punctual		1890	3.002	2.053	1332	1357
Poor little Heart!	F09.04.012	1896	2.009	3.043	192	214
Portraits are to daily faces	F08.02.007*	1891	1.032	1.058	170	174
Power is a familiar growth		1945	1.564		1238	1287
Praise it — 'tis dead		1945	1.408		1384	1406
Prayer is the little implement	F29.04.014	1891	1.054	1.080	437	623
Precious to Me — She still shall be	F36.05.017	1945	1.196		727	751
Presentiment — is that long Shadow — on the Lawn	F23.03.009	1890	3.016	2.067	764	487
Promise This — When You be Dying	F34.03.007	1935	3.090	7.078	648	762
Proud of my broken heart, since thou didst break it,		1896	2.001	3.035	1736	1760
Publication — is the Auction	F37.05.016	1929	1.004	6.002	709	788
Purple — is fashionable twice		1945	1.499		980	896
Pursuing you in your transitions					1602	1664
Put up my lute!	F13.04.014	1935	4.140	7.122	261	324
Quite empty, quite at rest					1606	1632
Rather arid delight					1679	1718
Read — Sweet — how others — strove	F13.04.013	1890	1.018	1.018	260	323
Rearrange a Wife's affection!	F11.07.016	1945	1.275		1737	267
Recollect the Face of me		1945	1.335		1305	1306
Red Sea, indeed! Talk not to me		1945	1.027		1642	1681
Rehearsal to Ourselves	F30.04.013	1929	6.179	6.162	379	664
Remember me implored the Thief!	S08a.03.003	1914	4.096	5.096	1180	1208
Remembrance has a Rear and Front	S10.02.006	1896	1.041	1.124	1182	1234
Remorse — is Memory — awake	F37.03.009	1891	1.043	1.069	744	781
Removed from Accident of Loss	F14.04.013	1935	2.073	7.064	424	417
Renunciation — is a piercing Virtue	F37.03.010	1929	6.167	6.150	745	782
Reportless Subjects, to the Quick	S06a.04.014	1945	1.547		1048	1118
Rest at Night	F23.04.012	1945	1.014		714	490
Reverse cannot befall	F27.06.019	1914	1.008	5.008	395	565
Revolution is the Pod	S07.24.119	1929	1.033	6.030	1082	1044
Ribbons of the Year	S06b.03.011	1945	1.172		873	1065
Risk is the Hair that holds the Tun		1945	1.574		1239	1253
Robbed by Death — but that was easy	F40.06.020	1945	1.278		971	838
Safe Despair it is that raves		1914	5.135	5.138	1243	1196
Safe in their Alabaster Chambers	F06.03.012*	1890	4.004	4.004	216	124
Said Death to Passion	S07.12.057	1945	1.354		1033	988
Sang from the Heart, Sire	S06b.08.031	1945	1.261		1059	1083
Satisfaction — is the Agent	S07.11.053	1945	1.552		1036	984
Savior! I've no one else to tell	F12.03.011	1896	2.014*	3.048	217	295
Secrets is a daily word		1945	1.559		1385	1494
September's Baccalaureate	S15.01.001	1945	1.062		1271	1313
Severer Service of myself	F39.06.020	1945	1.283		786	887
Sexton! My Master's sleeping here.	F03.02.009	1935	4.113	7.096	96	75
Shall I take thee, the Poet said		1945	1.436		1126	1243
Shame is the shawl of Pink		1945	1.491		1412	1437
She bore it till the simple veins	F04.04.013	1935	4.130	7.112	144	81
She could not live upon the Past		1945	2.611		1505	1535
She dealt her pretty words like Blades	F22.02.003	1929	1.032	6.029	479	458
She died — this was the way she died.	F07.03.015	1891	4.030	4.070	150	154
She died at play	F06.02.006	1914	2.036	5.036	75	141
She dwelleth in the Ground	F36.03.009	1945	2.663		671	744
She hideth Her the last	F27.06.018	1935	2.065	7.056	557	564
She laid her docile Crescent down		1896	4.019	4.101	1396	1453
She lay as if at play	F20.05.017	1935	4.129	7.111	369	412
She rose as high as His Occasion	S07.19.094	1945	1.404		1011	1019
She rose to His Requirement — dropt	F38.04.012	1890	2.017	3.017	732	857
She sights a Bird — she chuckles	F17.02.005	1945	1.117		507	351
She slept beneath a tree	F01.02.015	1896	3.002	2.084	25	15
She sped as Petals of a Rose					991	897
She staked her Feathers — Gained an Arc	F38.03.008	1935	4.133	7.115	798	853
She sweeps with many-colored Brooms	F13.03.008	1891	3.040	2.040	219	318
She went as quiet as the Dew	F07.02.008	1890	4.028	4.028	149	159
She's happy, with a new Content	F25.06.019	1935	4.132	7.114	535	587
Shells from the Coast mistaking	F35.01.002	1945	1.216		693	716
Should you but fail at — Sea					226	275
Show me Eternity, and I will show you Memory						1658
Sic transit gloria mundi					3	2
Silence is all we dread.		1945	2.631		1251	1300
Size circumscribes — it has no room	F33.03.008	1935	2.070	7.061	641	707
Sleep is supposed to be	F03.04.022	1890	4.038	4.038	13	35
Smiling back from Coronation	F31.06.022	1945	1.546		385	651
Snow beneath whose chilly softness	S05.06.028	1945	1.388		942	921
Snow flakes.	F02.01.004	1945	1.174		36	45
So bashful when I spied her!	F03.01.004	1890	3.019	2.070	91	70
So from the mould	F05.01.001	1914	2.052	5.052	66	110
So gay a Flower		1914	1.019	5.019	1456	1496
So give me back to Death		1945	1.337		1632	1653
So glad we are — a Stranger'd deem	F26.06.020				329	608
So has a Daisy vanished	F01.03.019	1945	1.364		28	19
So I pull my Stockings off	S11.01.001	1945	1.158		1201	1271
So large my Will	S07.22.110	1945	1.190		1024	1035
So much of Heaven has gone from Earth	S10.04.012	1929	2.050*	6.044	1228	1240
So much Summer	F34.02.006	1945	1.195		651	761
So proud she was to die		1896	4.035	4.117	1272	1278
So set its Sun in Thee	S07.01.005	1914	5.130	5.132	808	940
So the Eyes accost — and sunder	F37.06.020	1929	6.136	6.121	752	792
So well that I can live without	F32.01.003	1929	6.168	6.151	456	682
Society for me my misery		1945	2.634		1534	1195
Soft as the massacre of Suns		1945	2.623		1127	1146
Softened by Time's consummate plush		1896	1.055	1.138	1738	1772
Soil of Flint, if steady tilled	F38.06.017	1896	1.027	1.110	681	862
Some — Work for Immortality	F28.04.013	1929	1.005	6.003	406	536
Some Arrows slay but whom they strike					1565	1666
Some Days retired from the rest		1914	2.040	5.040	1157	1169
Some keep the Sabbath going to Church	F09.07.029	1890	3.006	2.057	324	236
Some one prepared this mighty show		1945	1.056		1644	1678
Some Rainbow — coming from the Fair!	F07.04.018	1890	3.008	2.059	64	162
Some say goodnight — at night	F25.06.018	1929	6.157	6.141	1739	586
Some such Butterfly be seen	F30.03.010	1935	2.058	7.049	541	661
Some things that fly there be	F03.01.002	1890	1.014	1.014	89	68
Some we see no more, Tenements of Wonder	S08a.06.006	1945	1.418		1221	1210
Some Wretched creature, savior take		1945	1.231		1111	1132
Some, too fragile for winter winds	F04.02.009	1891	4.011	4.051	141	91
Somehow myself survived the Night	S08a.04.004	1935	1.014	7.012	1194	1209
Sometimes with the Heart					1680	1727
Somewhat, to hope for	S07.14.069	1945	1.467		1041	998
Somewhere upon the general Earth	S08b.10.010	1945	1.332		1231	1226
Soto! Explore thyself!	S05.08.034				832	814
Soul, take thy risk.		1945	2.624		1151	1136
Soul, Wilt thou toss again?	F04.02.007	1890	1.003	1.003	139	89
South Winds jostle them	F05.02.009	1891	3.038	2.038	86	98
Sown in dishonor!	F07.03.014	1914	4.098	5.098	62	153
Speech — is a prank of Parliament					688	193
Speech is one symptom of Affection		1914	4.108	5.110	1681	1694
Split the Lark — and you'll find the Music	S05.02.007	1896	2.007	3.041	861	905
Spring comes on the World	S07.14.070	1945	1.256		1042	999
Spring is the Period	S07.03.013	1945	1.052		844	948
Spurn the temerity					1432	1485
Step lightly on this narrow spot	S09.01.001	1891	4.004*	4.044	1183	1227
Still own thee — still thou art		1945	1.312		1633	1654
Strong Draughts of Their Refreshing Minds	F34.06.016	1929	1.013	6.011	711	770
Struck, was I, not yet by Lightning	S04a.01.002	1945	1.253		925	841
Success is counted sweetest	F05.01.003	1890	1.001	1.001	67	112
Such are the inlets of the mind		1945	1.434		1421	1431
Such is the Force of Happiness	F39.06.022	1945	1.504		787	889
Summer — we all have seen		1945	1.055		1386	1413
Summer begins to have the look		1914	2.065	5.065	1682	1693
Summer for thee, grant I may be	F01.04.022	1896	2.006	3.040	31	7
Summer has two Beginnings		1945	1.069		1422	1457
Summer is shorter than any one		1945	1.523		1506	1483
Summer laid her simple Hat					1363	1411
Sunset at Night — is natural	F15.02.005	1929	3.075	6.067	415	427
Sunset that screens, reveals		1945	1.029		1609	1644
Superfluous were the Sun	S07.18.088	1896	4.034	4.116	999	1013
Superiority to Fate	S07.24.118	1896	1.002	1.085	1081	1043
Surgeons must be very careful	F07.03.017	1891	1.016	1.042	108	156
Surprise is like a thrilling — pungent		1945	1.575		1306	1324
Suspense — is Hostiler than Death	F37.01.003	1929	5.127	6.114	705	775
Sweet — safe — Houses	F32.02.005	1945	1.383		457	684
Sweet — You forgot — but I remembered	F31.02.006*	1945	1.293		523	635
Sweet hours have perished here;		1896	4.025	4.107	1767	1785
Sweet is the swamp with its secrets		1896	3.019	2.101	1740	1780
Sweet Mountains — Ye tell Me no lie	F36.03.010	1945	1.035		722	745
Sweet Pirate of the heart					1546	1568
Sweet Skepticism of the Heart		1945	1.502		1413	1438
Sweet, to have had them lost	S07.09.044	1935	4.142	7.124	901	809
Take all away					1365	1390
Take all away from me, but leave me Ecstasy					1640	1671
Take your Heaven further on	F30.06.021	1935	4.121	7.104	388	672
Taken from men — this morning	F03.04.021	1891	4.033	4.073	53	34
Taking up the fair Ideal	F19.03.008	1945	1.425		428	386
Talk not to me of Summer Trees		1945	1.483		1634	1655
Talk with prudence to a Beggar	F05.03.016	1891	1.037	1.063	119	118
Teach Him — When He makes the names					227	198
Tell all the Truth but tell it slant		1945	1.449		1129	1263
Tell as a Marksman — were forgotten		1945	1.234		1152	1148
Than Heaven more remote					1436	1460
That after Horror — that 'twas us	F11.05.010	1935	4.145	7.127	286	243
That Distance was between Us	S05.02.009	1945	1.203		863	906
That first Day, when you praised Me, Sweet	F22.04.015	1935	3.092	7.079	659	470
That I did always love	F31.06.023	1890	2.008	3.008	549	652
That is solemn we have ended	S05.03.011	1896	4.005	4.087	934	907
That it will never come again		1945	1.518		1741	1761
That Love is all there is		1914	5.110	5.112	1765	1747
That odd old man is dead a year		1945	1.406		1130	1156
That sacred Closet when you sweep	S14.05.014	1945	1.535		1273	1385
That she forgot me was the least		1914	5.132	5.134	1683	1716
That short — potential stir		1890	4.013	4.013	1307	1363
That Such have died enable Us	S06b.08.030	1896	4.008	4.090	1030	1082
That this should feel the need of Death		1945	1.407		1112	1189
The Admirations — and Contempts — of time	F40.04.012	1929	5.119	6.106	906	830
The Angle of a Landscape	F25.04.010	1945	1.153		375	578
The Auctioneer of Parting		1945	1.506		1612	1646
The Bat is dun, with wrinkled Wings		1896	3.022	2.104	1575	1408
The Battle fought between the Soul	F29.06.020	1929	5.125	6.112	594	629
The Bee is not afraid of me.	F05.01.004	1890	3.007	2.058	111	113
The Beggar at the Door for Fame		1945	1.455		1240	1291
The Beggar Lad — dies early	F23.06.018	1945	1.170		717	496
The Bible is an antique Volume				5.104	1545	1577
The Bird did prance — the Bee did play		1945	1.010		1107	1147
The Bird her punctual music brings					1585	1556
The Bird must sing to earn the Crumb	S05.09.037	1945	1.555		880	928
The Birds begun at Four o'clock	F39.05.017	1945	1.002		783	504
The Birds reported from the South	F37.03.008	1935	2.049	7.041	743	780
The Black Berry — wears a Thorn in his side	F27.01.002	1945	1.159		554	548
The Blood is more showy than the Breath		1945	2.633			1558
The Blunder is in estimate.		1914	1.016	5.016	1684	1690
The Bobolink is gone		1945	1.111		1591	1620
The Body grows without	F15.06.016	1891	1.044	1.070	578	438
The Bone that has no Marrow	S08b.02.002	1896	1.044	1.127	1274	1218
The Brain — is wider than the Sky	F26.03.010	1896	1.043	1.126	632	598
The Brain, within its Groove	F27.05.017	1890	1.026	1.026	556	563
The Bustle in a House	S06c.06.021	1890	4.022	4.022	1078	1108
The Butterfly in honored Dust					1246	1305
The butterfly obtains		1914	2.042	5.042	1685	1701
The Butterfly upon the Sky					1521	1559
The Butterfly's Assumption Gown		1890	3.023	2.074	1244	1329
The Butterfly's Numidian Gown		1945	1.132		1387	1395
The Chemical conviction	S06b.05.018	1945	1.396		954	1070
The Child's faith is new	F33.01.002	1929	1.024	6.021	637	701
The Clock strikes one that just struck two					1569	1598
The Clouds their Backs together laid		1890	4.016	4.016	1172	1246
The Clover's simple Fame		1945	1.456		1232	1256
The Color of a Queen, is this	F39.02.006	1945	1.034		776	875
The Color of the Grave is Green	F15.01.002	1935	4.138	7.120	411	424
The competitions of the sky					1494	excluded
The Court is far away	F10.05.019	1945	1.300		235	250
The Crickets sang	S06c.05.017	1896	3.024	2.106	1104	1104
The Daisy follows soft the Sun	F07.02.010	1890	4.034	4.034	106	161
The Dandelion's pallid tube					1519	1565
The Day came slow — till Five o'clock	F25.02.004	1891	3.004	2.004	304	572
The Day grew small, surrounded tight		1945	1.070		1140	1164
The Day she goes		1945	1.193		1308	1302
The Day that I was crowned	F29.02.004	1935	3.096	7.083	356	613
The Day undressed — Herself	F23.06.017	1935	2.045	7.037	716	495
The Days that we can spare	S10.01.001	1945	1.544		1184	1229
The Definition of Beauty is	S06a.04.015				988	797
The Devil — had he fidelity		1914	4.092	5.092	1479	1510
The difference between Despair	F25.03.008	1914	1.024	5.024	305	576
The distance that the dead have gone		1896	4.011	4.093	1742	1781
The Ditch is dear to the Drunken man		1945	1.242		1645	1679
The Doomed — regard the Sunrise	F12.03.014	1929	4.095	6.084	294	298
The Drop, that wrestles in the Sea	F11.01.002	1945	1.266		284	255
The Dust behind I strove to join	S02.01.002	1896	1.023	1.106	992	867
The duties of the Wind are few		1914	2.049	5.049	1137	1160
The Dying need but little, Dear	S07.22.112	1896	4.037	4.119	1026	1037
The earth has many keys.		1945	1.139		1775	895
The ecstasy to guess					1608	1680
The event was directly behind Him					1686	1724
The face I carry with me — last	F19.07.017	1945	1.333		336	395
The Face in evanescence lain					1490	1521
The Face we choose to miss		1914	5.136	5.139	1141	1293
The Fact that Earth is Heaven		1945	1.412		1408	1435
The fairest Home I ever knew		1945	2.601		1423	1443
The farthest Thunder that I heard		1896	1.026	1.109	1581	1665
The fascinating chill that music leaves		1945	1.452		1480	1511
The feet of people walking home	F01.03.016*	1914	3.084	5.084	7	16
The Fingers of the Light	S07.18.090	1945	1.001		1000	1015
The first Day that I was a Life	F40.02.004	1945	2.605		902	823
The first Day's Night had come	F15.01.001	1935	1.013	7.011	410	423
The first We knew of Him was Death	S07.15.078	1945	1.462		1006	1006
The Flake the Wind exasperate					1361	1410
The Flower must not blame the Bee	F09.07.028	1935	2.064	7.055	206	235
The Frost of Death was on the Pane		1945	1.098		1136	1130
The Frost was never seen		1945	1.097		1202	1190
The Future — never spoke	F31.03.009	1914	1.031	5.031	672	638
The Gentian has a parched Corolla		1945	1.148		1424	1458
The Gentian weaves her fringes	F01.01.001	1891	3.047	2.047	18	21
The gleam of an heroic Act		1914	1.027	5.027	1687	1686
The going from a world we know					1603	1662
The good Will of a Flower	S07.04.019	1945	1.093		849	954
The Grace — Myself — might not obtain	F37.02.007	1935	2.061	7.052	707	779
The Grass so little has to do	F19.01.001	1890	3.009	2.060	333	379
The grave my little cottage is		1896	4.023	4.105	1743	1784
The Guest is gold and crimson	F02.01.003				15	44
The hallowing of Pain	F39.01.002	1945	1.413		772	871
The harm of Years is on him	S08a.11.011	1945	1.349		1280	1215
The healed Heart shows its shallow scar		1914	5.138	5.141	1440	1466
The Heart asks Pleasure — first	F25.06.020	1890	1.009	1.009	536	588
The Heart has many Doors					1567	1623
The Heart has narrow Banks	S07.05.025	1945	1.481		928	960
The Heart is the Capital of the Mind	S14.04.010	1929	6.138	6.123	1354	1381
The Heaven vests for Each	F35.01.003	1935	3.087	7.075	694	717
The Hills erect their Purple Heads		1914	2.057	5.057	1688	1728
The Hills in Purple syllables	S07.20.101	1945	1.166		1016	1026
The Himmaleh was known to stoop	F22.02.005	1935	2.066	7.057	481	460
The Hollows round His eager Eyes	S06b.05.019	1945	1.233		955	1071
The immortality she gave					1648	1684
The incidents of love		1914	5.133	5.135	1248	1172
The Infinite a sudden Guest		1945	1.431		1309	1344
The inundation of the Spring		1914	5.115	5.117	1425	1423
The Jay his Castanet has struck		1945	1.141		1635	1670
The joy that has no stem no core		1945	1.496		1744	1762
The Judge is like the Owl	F35.04.014	1945	1.137		699	728
The Juggler's Hat her Country is					330	186
The Lady feeds Her little Bird	S05.07.033	1945	1.167		941	925
The Lamp burns sure — within	F10.01.004	1935	1.017	7.015	233	247
The largest Fire ever known	S07.08.042	1914	2.046	5.046	1114	974
The Lassitudes of Contemplation		1945	2.621		1592	1613
The last Night that She lived	S06c.04.013	1890	4.020	4.020	1100	1100
The last of Summer is Delight	S14.04.009	1929	3.085	6.077	1353	1380
The Leaves like Women interchange	S06c.03.011	1891	3.032	2.032	987	1098
The Life that tied too tight escapes		1945	1.218		1535	1555
The Life we have is very great.		1945	1.465		1162	1178
The Lightning is a yellow Fork		1945	1.020		1173	1140
The Lightning playeth — all the while	F26.02.007	1945	1.021		630	595
The Lilac is an ancient shrub		1945	1.030		1241	1261
The Loneliness One dare not sound	F39.03.008	1945	1.490		777	877
The lonesome for they know not What	F13.05.016	1929	5.130	6.117	262	326
The long sigh of the Frog		1914	2.053	5.053	1359	1394
The longest day that God appoints					1769	1153
The look of thee, what is it like		1914	3.091	5.091	1689	1731
The Love a Life can show Below	F35.06.019	1929	6.147	6.132	673	285
The lovely flowers embarrass me						808
The Luxury to apprehend	S06a.01.002	1914	5.111	5.113	815	819
The Malay — took the Pearl	F21.04.013	1945	1.238		452	451
The Manner of its Death	F26.04.014	1945	1.340		468	602
The Martyr Poets — did not tell	F30.04.014	1935	1.026	7.024	544	665
The Merchant of the Picturesque		1945	2.604		1131	1134
The Mind lives on the Heart	S14.05.013	1945	1.433		1355	1384
The Missing All — prevented Me	S07.13.066	1914	1.021	5.021	985	995
The mob within the heart		1945	1.175		1745	1763
The Months have ends — the Years — a knot	F14.04.012	1935	4.117	7.100	423	416
The Moon is distant from the Sea	F19.03.009	1891	2.013	3.031	429	387
The Moon upon her fluent Route		1914	2.059	5.059	1528	1574
The Moon was but a Chin of Gold	F35.08.024	1896	3.021	2.103	737	735
The Morning after Woe	F20.01.003	1935	4.134	7.116	364	398
The morns are meeker than they were	F03.04.019	1890	3.028	2.079	12	32
The most important population		1945	1.120		1746	1764
The most pathetic thing I do		1945	1.285		1290	1345
The most triumphant Bird I ever knew or met					1265	1285
The Mountain sat upon the Plain	S07.08.037	1890	3.021	2.072	975	970
The Mountains — grow unnoticed	F34.05.014	1929	3.078	6.070	757	768
The Mountains stood in Haze	S08b.09.009	1945	1.036		1278	1225
The Murmur of a Bee	F09.03.006	1890	3.003	2.054	155	217
The murmuring of Bees, has ceased		1896	3.029	2.111	1115	1142
The Mushroom is the Elf of Plants	S13.01.001	1891	3.025	2.025	1298	1350
The name — of it — is Autumn	F22.03.010	1945	1.065		656	465
The nearest Dream recedes — unrealized	F14.01.001	1891	1.003	1.029	319	304
The Night was wide, and furnished scant	F29.03.008	1891	2.008	3.026	589	617
The Notice that is called the Spring		1945	1.050		1310	1319
The One who could repeat the Summer day	F27.01.003	1891	3.029	2.029	307	549
The ones that disappeared are back		1914	2.063	5.063	1690	1697
The only Ghost I ever saw	F12.06.022	1891	4.010	4.050	274	331
The Only News I know	F40.01.001	1929	5.115	6.102	827	820
The Opening and the Close	S06b.09.037	1945	1.381		1047	1089
The Outer — from the Inner	F21.04.011	1935	2.069	7.060	451	450
The overtakelessness of those		1914	3.090	5.090	1691	894
The parasol is the umbrella's daughter		1945	1.152		1747	1765
The Past is such a curious Creature	S11.01.003	1896	1.045	1.128	1203	1273
The pattern of the sun		1945	1.003		1550	1580
The pedigree of Honey		1890	3.005*	2.056	1627	1650
The Pile of Years is not so high		1945	1.318		1507	1337
The Poets light but Lamps	S05.10.040	1945	1.432		883	930
The Popular Heart is a Cannon first	S08b.04.004	1929	1.006	6.004	1226	1220
The power to be true to You	F32.06.021	1929	6.169	6.152	464	699
The pretty Rain from those sweet Eaves		1945	1.247		1426	1444
The Products of my Farm are these	S07.22.111	1945	1.066		1025	1036
The Props assist the House	F35.05.015	1914	1.026	5.026	1142	729
The Province of the Saved	F30.03.008	1935	4.143	7.125	539	659
The pungent atom in the Air	S08b.06.006	1945	1.064		1191	1222
The rainbow never tells me	F03.02.010	1929	3.056	6.048	97	76
The Rat is the concisest Tenant.		1891	3.035	2.035	1356	1369
The Red — Blaze — is the Morning	F26.04.015	1945	1.042		469	603
The reticent volcano keeps		1896	1.024	1.107	1748	1776
The Riddle we can guess		1945	1.576		1222	1180
The right to perish might be thought		1914	1.005	5.005	1692	1726
The Road to Paradise is plain		1945	1.405		1491	1525
The Road was lit with Moon and star		1945	1.045		1450	1474
The Robin for the Crumb	S06a.01.003	1945	1.116		864	810
The Robin is a Gabriel		1945	1.114		1483	1520
The Robin is the One	S06c.02.005	1891	3.006	2.006	828	501
The Robin's my Criterion for Tune	F11.01.003	1929	3.060	6.052	285	256
The Rose did caper on her cheek	F10.02.007	1891	2.011	3.029	208	200
The saddest noise, the sweetest noise					1764	1789
The Savior must have been				A.001	1487	1538
The Sea said Come to the Brook	S11.02.006	1914	5.112	5.114	1210	1275
The Service without Hope	F39.03.011	1945	1.471		779	880
The Show is not the Show		1891	1.018	1.044	1206	1270
The Skies can't keep their secret!	F09.04.011	1891	3.016	2.016	191	213
The Sky is low — the Clouds are mean.		1890	3.029	2.080	1075	1121
The smouldering embers blush		1945	1.325		1132	1143
The Snow that never drifts		1945	1.049		1133	1155
The Soul has Bandaged moments	F17.06.014	1945	1.473		512	360
The Soul selects her own Society	F20.04.014	1890	1.013	1.013	303	409
The Soul should always stand ajar	S07.19.092	1896	4.039	4.121	1055	1017
The Soul that hath a Guest	F26.01.004	1914	1.002	5.002	674	592
The Soul unto itself	F25.04.011	1891	1.015	1.041	683	579
The Soul's distinct connection	S05.01.003	1929	5.116	6.103	974	901
The Soul's Superior instants	F31.01.001	1914	1.033	5.033	306	630
The Spider as an Artist	S14.01.002	1896	3.013	2.095	1275	1373
The Spider holds a Silver Ball	F24.02.008	1945	1.138		605	513
The Spirit is the Conscious Ear.	F35.01.004	1945	1.438		733	718
The Spirit lasts — but in what mode					1576	1627
The spry Arms of the Wind		1945	1.441		1103	802
The Stars are old, that stood for me		1914	5.140	5.144	1249	1242
The stem of a departed Flower					1520	1543
The Stimulus, beyond the Grave	S07.15.073	1896	4.006	4.088	1001	1001
The Suburbs of a Secret		1914	1.023	5.023	1245	1171
The Summer that we did not prize		1945	1.059		1773	1622
The Sun — just touched the Morning	F10.01.003	1891	3.005	2.005	232	246
The Sun and Fog contested		1945	1.011		1190	1248
The Sun and Moon must make their haste	S06b.03.009	1945	1.040		871	1063
The Sun in reigning to the West		1945	2.600		1636	1656
The Sun is gay or stark	S05.06.030	1945	1.466		878	922
The Sun is one — and on the Tare		1945	1.009		1372	1399
The Sun kept setting — setting — still	F35.01.001	1890	4.025	4.025	692	715
The Sun kept stooping — stooping — low!	F08.01.002	1945	1.031		152	182
The Sun retired to a cloud					1693	1709
The Sun went down — no Man looked on	S06c.06.022	1929	3.053	6.045	1079	1109
The Sunrise runs for Both	F34.04.010	1929	6.152	6.136	710	765
The Sunset stopped on Cottages	S06a.03.011	1945	1.032		950	1116
The sweetest Heresy received	F30.06.020	1929	2.042	6.036	387	671
The Sweets of Pillage, can be known		1914	4.102	5.103	1470	1504
The Symptom of the Gale					1327	1328
The Test of Love — is Death	F28.05.018	1935	4.147	7.129	573	541
The Things that never can come back, are several		1945	1.529		1515	1564
The things we thought that we should do					1293	1279
The thought beneath so slight a film	F10.02.010	1891	1.014	1.040	210	203
The Thrill came slowly like a Boom for		1945	1.319		1495	1528
The Tint I cannot take — is best	F32.05.017	1929	3.054	6.046	627	696
The Treason of an accent		1914	5.119	5.121	1358	1388
The Trees like Tassels — hit — and swung	F24.07.021	1935	2.051	7.043	606	523
The Truth — is stirless	F39.04.013	1945	1.447		780	882
The vastest earthly Day		1945	1.357		1328	1323
The Veins of other Flowers	S07.05.027	1945	1.092		811	798
The Voice that stands for Floods to me	S08a.02.002	1945	1.310		1189	1207
The waters chased him as he fled		1945	1.342		1749	1766
The way Hope builds his House		1945	1.470		1481	1512
The Way I read a Letter's — this	F33.01.001	1891	2.006	3.024	636	700
The Way to know the Bobolink	S12.01.001	1945	1.110		1279	1348
The Well upon the Brook	S07.26.126	1945	1.445		1091	1051
The Whole of it came not at once	F23.03.007	1945	1.507		762	485
The Wind — tapped like a tired Man	F29.04.012	1891	3.030	2.030	436	621
The Wind begun to knead the Grass		1891	3.037	2.037	824	796
The Wind didn't come from the Orchard — today	F23.05.016				316	494
The wind drew off		1914	2.050	5.050	1694	1703
The Wind took up the Northern Things		1945	1.023		1134	1152
The Winters are so short	F28.02.008*	1935	2.042	7.035	403	532
The words the happy say		1945	1.487		1750	1767
The Work of Her that went					1143	1159
The World — feels Dusty	F23.04.013	1929	4.109	6.098	715	491
The World — stands — solemner — to me		1945	1.276		493	280
The worthlessness of Earthly things		1945	1.100		1373	1400
The Zeroes — taught us — Phosphorous	F35.05.017	1929	A.201	A.004	689	284
Their Barricade against the Sky		1945	1.024		1471	1505
Their dappled importunity		1945	2.664		1611	1677
Their Height in Heaven comforts not	F35.04.011	1891	4.015	4.055	696	725
Themself are all I have	S07.26.129	1935	2.060	7.051	1094	1054
There are two Mays					1618	1637
There are two Ripenings — one — of sight	F14.05.016	1929	A.200	A.003	332	420
There came a Day at Summer's full	F13.05.015	1890	2.013	3.013	322	325
There came a Wind like a Bugle		1891	3.026	2.026	1593	1618
There comes a warning like a spy		1945	1.060		1536	1560
There comes an hour when begging stops		1945	1.494		1751	1768
There is a finished feeling	S06c.01.004	1945	1.394		856	1092
There is a flower that Bees prefer	F31.04.013	1890	3.015	2.066	380	642
There is a June when Corn is cut	S06c.01.002	1945	1.068		930	811
There is a Languor of the Life	F27.03.006	1929	6.176	6.159	396	552
There is a morn by men unseen	F01.02.013	1945	1.429		24	13
There is a pain — so utter	F24.03.010	1929	6.177	6.160	599	515
There is a Shame of Nobleness	F30.05.017	1891	4.016	4.056	551	668
There is a solitude of space		1914	1.025	5.025	1695	1696
There is a word	F02.01.001	1896	2.010	3.044	8	42
There is a Zone whose even Years	S07.19.095	1945	1.417		1056	1020
There is an arid Pleasure	F39.04.016	1945	1.505		782	885
There is another Loneliness		1914	1.018	5.018	1116	1138
There is another sky					2	A13-2
There is no Frigate like a Book		1896	1.016	1.099	1263	1286
There is no Silence in the Earth — so silent	S07.15.076	1945	1.488		1004	1004
There is a strength in proving that it can be borne		1945	1.468		1113	1133
There's a certain Slant of light	F13.03.010	1890	3.031	2.082	258	320
There's been a Death, in the Opposite House	F27.01.001	1896	4.048	4.130	389	547
There's something quieter than sleep	F02.05.021	1896	4.038	4.120	45	62
There's the Battle of Burgoyne		1945	1.026		1174	1316
These — saw Visions	F34.06.015	1935	4.125	7.108	758	769
These are the days that Reindeer love		1914	2.068	5.068	1696	1705
These are the days when Birds come back	F06.03.010	1890	3.027	2.078	130	122
These are the Nights that Beetles love		1945	1.130		1128	1150
These are the Signs to Nature's Inns	S06c.06.019	1929	3.074	6.066	1077	1106
These Fevered Days — to take them to the Forest		1945	1.058		1441	1467
These held their Wick above the West					1390	1416
These Strangers, in a foreign World		1945	1.104		1096	805
These tested Our Horizon	S05.10.044	1945	1.403		886	934
They ask but our Delight	S05.03.012	1945	1.082		868	908
They called me to the Window, for	F26.01.001	1945	1.025		628	589
They dropped like Flakes	F28.07.023	1891	4.009	4.049	409	545
They have a little Odor — that to me	F39.05.019	1945	1.088		785	505
They have not chosen me, he said	F04.03.012				85	87
They leave us with the Infinite.	F17.02.006	1945	1.416		350	352
They might not need me — yet they might					1391	1425
They put Us far apart	F33.04.009	1935	3.100	7.086	474	708
They say that Time assuages	F38.05.016	1896	4.003	4.085	686	861
They shut me up in Prose	F21.02.006	1935	2.034	7.029	613	445
They talk as slow as Legends grow					1697	1732
They won't frown always — some sweet Day	S05.07.031	1896	4.009	4.091	874	923
This — is the land — the Sunset washes	F12.03.013	1890	3.013	2.064	266	297
This Bauble was preferred of Bees	F38.06.018	1935	2.063	7.054	805	863
This Chasm, Sweet, upon my life	S06b.02.007	1945	1.306		858	1061
This Consciousness that is aware	S06a.03.009	1914	1.001	5.001	822	817
This dirty — little — Heart	S14.02.007	1945	1.165		1311	1378
This docile one inter		1945	1.363		1752	1769
This Dust, and its Feature	S02.01.001	1945	1.420		936	866
This heart that broke so long	F04.04.015	1935	4.131	7.113	145	83
This is a Blossom of the Brain	S06a.02.005	1945	1.442		945	1112
This is my letter to the World	F24.04.014	1890	0.000	1.000	441	519
This is the place they hoped before					1264	1284
This Me — that walks and works — must die		1945	1.228		1588	1616
This Merit hath the worst	S04b.01.002	1891	1.049	1.075	979	844
This quiet Dust was Gentleman and Ladies	S06c.01.001	1914	3.074	5.074	813	1090
This slow Day moved along		1945	1.039		1120	1198
This that would greet — an hour ago	F39.03.010	1945	1.356		778	879
This was a Poet — It is That	F21.03.007	1929	1.012	6.010	448	446
This was in the White of the Year	S07.18.089	1896	4.024	4.106	995	1014
This World is not Conclusion.	F18.04.012*	1896	4.001*	4.083	501	373
Tho' I get home how late — how late	F10.02.006	1891	1.022	1.048	207	199
Tho' my destiny be Fustian	F10.02.005				163	131
Those — dying then		1945	1.599		1551	1581
Those cattle smaller than a Bee		1945	1.136		1388	1393
Those fair — fictitious People	F18.03.008	1929	4.101	6.090	499	369
Those final Creatures, — who they are		1914	2.064	5.064	1766	1746
Those not live yet					1454	1486
Those who have been in the Grave the longest	S07.01.001	1945	1.338		922	938
Though the great Waters sleep					1599	1641
Three times — we parted — Breath — and I	F24.03.009	1929	4.098	6.087	598	514
Three Weeks passed since I had seen Her	S07.13.062	1896	4.040	4.122	1061	992
Through lane it lay — through bramble	F02.01.002			5.099	9	43
Through the Dark Sod — as Education	F27.04.013	1929	3.076	6.068	392	559
Through the strait pass of suffering	F36.05.016	1891	1.012	1.038	792	187
Through those old Grounds of memory		1945	1.536		1753	1770
Through what transports of Patience		1945	1.323		1153	1265
Tie the Strings to my Life, My Lord	F16.02.003	1896	4.036	4.118	279	338
Till Death — is narrow Loving	F40.04.013	1929	6.186	6.168	907	831
Time does go on		1945	1.515		1121	1338
Time feels so vast that were it not	F38.04.013	1935	2.031	7.026	802	858
Time's wily Chargers will not wait					1458	1498
Tis Anguish grander than Delight	S07.16.083	1914	3.089*	5.089	984	192
Tis customary as we part	F29.06.019	1945	1.147		440	628
Tis easier to pity those when dead					1698	1719
Tis good — the looking back on Grief	F22.05.017	1935	4.116	7.099	660	472
Tis little I — could care for Pearls	F26.03.009	1896	1.001	1.084	466	597
Tis my first night beneath the Sun		1945	1.046		1122	1151
Tis not that Dying hurts us so	F28.01.004	1945	1.379		335	528
Tis not the swaying frame we miss					1597	1631
Tis One by One — the Father counts	F31.05.017	1945	1.169		545	646
Tis Opposites — entice	F29.01.003	1929	1.009	6.007	355	612
Tis Seasons since the Dimpled War		1945	2.609		1529	1551
Tis so appalling — it exhilarates	F16.03.006	1935	4.146	7.128	281	341
Tis so much joy! 'Tis so much joy!	F08.03.009	1890	1.004	1.004	172	170
Tis Sunrise — Little Maid — Hast Thou	F40.04.014	1896	4.014	4.096	908	832
Tis true — They shut me in the Cold	F30.03.007	1945	1.176		538	658
Tis whiter than an Indian Pipe		1896	4.018	4.100	1482	1513
Title divine — is mine!				3.057	1072	194
To be alive — is Power	F39.02.007	1914	1.009	5.009	677	876
To be forgot by thee		1945	1.287		1560	1601
To break so vast a Heart		1945	1.329		1312	1308
To die — takes just a little while	F13.02.005	1935	4.126	7.109	255	315
To die — without the Dying	S07.20.102	1945	1.328		1017	1027
To disappear enhances	S10.04.011	1914	1.028*	5.028	1209	1239
To do a magnanimous thing					1699	1729
To earn it by disdaining it		1945	2.620		1427	1445
To fight aloud, is very brave	F06.01.003	1890	1.016	1.016	126	138
To fill a Gap	F31.05.018	1929	4.091	6.081	546	647
To flee from memory		1945	1.538		1242	1343
To hang our head — ostensibly	F07.02.009	1896	1.042	1.125	105	160
To hear an Oriole sing	F20.02.007	1891	3.012	2.012	526	402
To help our Bleaker Parts	S06b.09.035	1896	1.046	1.129	1064	1087
To her derided Home		1945	1.090		1586	1617
To him who keeps an orchis' heart	F01.01.011	1945	1.077		22	31
To his simplicity					1352	1387
To interrupt His Yellow Plan	F29.04.013	1929	3.064	6.056	591	622
To know just how He suffered — would be dear	F32.03.009	1890	4.019	4.019	622	688
To learn the Transport by the Pain	F08.02.004	1891	1.052	1.078	167	178
To lose if one can find again	F01.01.010	1945	1.076		22	30
To lose one's faith — surpass	F31.01.003	1896	1.036	1.119	377	632
To lose thee — sweeter than to gain		1896	2.008	3.042	1754	1777
To love thee Year by Year	F29.03.009	1914	5.123	5.125	434	618
To make a prairie it takes a clover and one bee		1896	3.015	2.097	1755	1779
To make One's Toilette — after Death	F22.05.016	1935	3.101	7.087	485	471
To make Routine a Stimulus	S10.03.010	1929	1.037	6.034	1196	1238
To mend each tattered Faith		1945	1.578		1442	1468
To my quick ear the Leaves — conferred	S05.04.017	1896	3.010	2.092	891	912
To my small Hearth His fire came	F33.01.004				638	703
To offer brave assistance	F23.04.014	1929	1.027	6.024	767	492
To One denied the drink	S06b.01.004	1945	1.580		490	1058
To own a Susan of my own					1401	1436
To own the Art within the Soul	S06c.01.003	1945	1.595		855	1091
To pile like Thunder to its close		1914	5.139	5.143	1247	1353
To put this World down, like a Bundle	F20.03.009	1935	2.078	7.069	527	404
To see her is a Picture		1914	5.129	5.131	1568	1597
To see the Summer Sky		1945	1.440		1472	1491
To tell the Beauty would decrease		1914	5.122	5.124	1700	1689
To the bright east she flies					1573	1603
To the stanch Dust		1914	3.086	5.086	1402	1434
To their apartment deep		1914	4.097	5.097	1701	1744
To this World she returned.	S07.08.039				830	815
To try to speak, and miss the way					1617	1629
To undertake is to achieve	S07.12.061	1945	1.541		1070	991
To venerate the simple days	F02.04.014	1896	1.007	1.090	57	55
To wait an Hour — is long	F39.04.015	1945	1.286		781	884
To Whom the Mornings stand for Nights	S07.26.130	1935	1.015	7.013	1095	1055
Today or this noon		1914	3.078	5.078	1702	1706
Tomorrow — whose location					1367	1417
Too cold is this		1914	3.076	5.076	1135	1137
Too few the mornings be					1186	1201
Too happy Time dissolves itself		1945	1.585		1774	1182
Too little way the House must lie	S05.01.004	1935	4.115	7.098	911	902
Too scanty 'twas to die for you	S07.20.098	1945	1.305		1013	1023
Touch lightly Nature's sweet Guitar		1945	1.106		1389	1403
Tried always and Condemned by thee		1945	1.316		1559	1589
Triumph — may be of several kinds	F32.01.001	1891	4.017	4.057	455	680
Trudging to Eden, looking backward	S07.21.106	1945	1.163		1020	1031
Trust adjust her Peradventure					1161	1177
Trust in the Unexpected	F27.05.015	1935	2.074	7.065	555	561
Trusty as the stars					1369	1415
Truth — is as old as God	S07.07.032				836	795
Twas a long Parting — but the time	F32.04.012	1890	2.015	3.015	625	691
Twas awkward, but it fitted me	S05.01.002	1935	4.119	7.102	973	900
Twas comfort in her Dying Room		1914	3.075	5.075	1703	1740
Twas Crisis — All the length had passed	S06c.02.006	1945	1.352		948	1093
Twas fighting for his Life he was	S10.01.002	1945	1.464		1188	1230
Twas here my summer paused		1945	1.273		1756	1771
Twas just this time, last year, I died.	F16.05.010	1896	4.058	4.140	445	344
Twas later when the summer went		1890	3.026	2.077	1276	1312
Twas like a Maelstrom, with a notch	F15.02.003	1945	1.339		414	425
Twas Love — not me	F27.05.016	1945	1.297		394	562
Twas my one Glory	S07.23.115	1945	1.307		1028	1040
Twas such a little — little boat	F07.03.013	1890	1.023	1.023	107	152
Twas the old — road — through pain	F18.06.016	1929	4.102	6.091	344	376
Twas warm — at first — like Us	F29.02.005	1929	4.100	6.089	519	614
Twice had Summer her fair Verdure	S07.03.015	1945	1.067		846	950
Two — were immortal twice	F38.03.010	1945	1.373		800	855
Two butterflies went out at Noon	F25.02.003	1891	3.018*	2.018	533	571
Two Lengths has every Day		1914	1.032	5.032	1295	1354
Two swimmers wrestled on the spar	F09.06.023	1890	4.026	4.026	201	227
Two Travellers perishing in Snow	S07.07.034	1945	1.350		933	967
Twould ease — a Butterfly	F39.06.021	1945	1.311		682	888
Unable are the Loved to die	S07.04.016				809	951
Uncertain lease — develops lustre	S06b.02.005	1945	1.524		857	1059
Under the Light, yet under	S06b.04.014	1945	1.393		949	1068
Undue Significance a starving man attaches	F29.05.017	1891	1.045	1.071	439	626
Unfulfilled to Observation	F40.06.021	1935	2.075	7.066	972	839
Unit, like Death, for Whom?	F28.06.021	1935	4.135	7.117	408	543
Until the Desert knows		1945	1.579		1291	1262
Unto a broken heart					1704	1745
Unto like Story — Trouble has enticed me	F12.04.017	1935	1.009	7.007	295	300
Unto Me? I do not know you	F40.02.006	1929	2.049	6.043	964	825
Unto my Books — so good to turn	F24.02.007	1891	1.048	1.074	604	512
Unto the Whole — how add?		1945	1.526		1341	1370
Unworthy of her Breast		1945	1.246		1414	1439
Up Life's Hill with my little Bundle	S07.19.093	1945	1.184		1010	1018
Upon a Lilac Sea		1945	1.126		1337	1368
Upon Concluded Lives	F35.02.008	1945	1.395		735	722
Upon his Saddle sprung a Bird					1600	1663
Upon the gallows hung a wretch		1896	1.022	1.105	1757	1775
Victory comes late	F34.05.013	1891	1.026	1.052	690	195
Volcanoes be in Sicily		1914	5.117	5.119	1705	1691
Wait till the Majesty of Death	F08.03.008	1891	4.031	4.071	171	169
Warm in her Hand these accents lie		1945	2.665		1313	1307
Was not was all the Statement		1945	1.372		1342	1277
Water makes many Beds		1945	1.341		1428	1446
Water, is taught by thirst.	F04.01.002	1896	4.051	4.133	135	93
We — Bee and I — live by the quaffing	F10.01.001	1929	3.061	6.053	230	244
We can but follow to the Sun	S04b.01.003				920	845
We Cover Thee — Sweet Face	F22.02.006	1896	4.004	4.086	482	461
We do not know the time we lose					1106	1139
We do not play on Graves	F26.03.011	1945	1.171		467	599
We don't cry — Tim and I	F09.05.017	1945	1.155		196	231
We dream — it is good we are dreaming	F25.05.016	1935	2.076	7.067	531	584
We grow accustomed to the Dark	F15.03.006	1935	1.016	7.014	419	428
We introduce ourselves		1945	1.484		1214	1184
We knew not that we were to live					1462	1481
We learn it in Retreating	S07.24.120	1896	4.002	4.084	1083	1045
We learned the Whole of Love	F28.02.007	1945	1.260		568	531
We like a Hairbreadth 'scape		1945	1.222		1175	1247
We like March.		1896	3.006	2.088	1213	1194
We lose — because we win	F01.01.008	1945	1.533		21	28
We met as Sparks — Diverging Flints	S05.05.023	1945	1.289		958	918
We miss a Kinsman more	S07.25.122	1929	1.014	6.012	1087	1047
We miss Her, not because We see	F34.06.017	1945	1.362		993	771
We never know how high we are		1896	1.014	1.097	1176	1197
We never know we go when we are going		1896	4.049	4.131	1523	1546
We outgrow love, like other things	S06c.02.007	1896	2.015	3.049	887	1094
We play at Paste		1891	1.004	1.030	320	282
We pray — to Heaven	F22.06.021	1929	2.048	6.042	489	476
We see — Comparatively	F25.04.012	1929	1.035	6.032	534	580
We send the Wave to find the Wave					1604	1643
We shall find the Cube of the Rainbow.					1484	1517
We should not mind so small a flower	F04.04.014	1914	3.085	5.085	81	82
We shun because we prize her Face		1945	1.244		1429	1430
We shun it ere it comes					1580	1595
We talked as Girls do	F19.06.014	1929	4.099	6.088	586	392
We talked with each other about each other		1945	1.267*		1473	1506
We thirst at first — 'tis Nature's Act	F36.04.015	1896	4.052	4.134	726	750
We wear our sober Dresses when we die					1572	1619
We'll pass without the parting	S07.12.059				996	503
Went up a year this evening!	F03.01.006	1891	4.032	4.072	93	72
Were it but Me that gained the Height	S07.20.100	1945	2.612		1015	1025
Were it to be the last					1164	1165
Were natural mortal lady					1762	1787
Wert Thou but ill — that I might show thee	F40.01.002	1945	1.303		961	821
What care the Dead, for Chanticleer	F29.05.015				592	624
What did They do since I saw Them?	S06b.06.022	1945	1.402		900	1074
What I can do — I will	F31.03.012	1929	3.071	6.063	361	641
What I see not, I better see	S02.01.004	1945	1.291		939	869
What if I say I shall not wait!	F14.01.002	1891	2.016	3.034	277	305
What Inn is this	F05.02.011	1891	4.034	4.074	115	100
What is — Paradise	F09.02.005	1945	1.154		215	241
What mystery pervades a well!		1896	3.014	2.096	1400	1433
What shall I do — it whimpers so	F09.01.001	1945	2.639		186	237
What shall I do when the Summer troubles	S05.05.020	1945	1.296		956	915
What Soft — Cherubic Creatures	S01.01.003	1896	1.047	1.130	401	675
What tenements of clover					1338	1358
What Twigs We held by	S07.25.121	1935	1.024	7.022	1086	1046
What we see we know somewhat	S11.01.002	1945	1.542		1195	1272
What would I give to see his face?	F11.07.015	1929	6.150	6.135	247	266
Whatever it is — she has tried it		1945	1.365		1204	1200
When a Lover is a Beggar		1945	1.568		1314	1330
When Bells stop ringing — Church — begins	F26.04.013	1945	1.557		633	601
When Continents expire						1321
When Diamonds are a Legend	F27.03.007	1935	2.054	7.045	397	553
When Etna basks and purrs		1914	1.007	5.007	1146	1161
When I count the seeds	F02.02.008	1945	1.095		40	51
When I have seen the Sun emerge	S06c.02.008	1945	1.005		888	1095
When I hoped I feared	F26.02.006	1891	1.040	1.066	1181	594
When I hoped, I recollect	F23.05.015	1929	6.181	6.164	768	493
When I was small, a Woman died	F24.04.013	1890	4.033	4.033	596	518
When Katie walks, this simple pair accompany her side					222	49
When Memory is full					1266	1301
When Night is almost done	S01.02.007	1890	1.017	1.017	347	679
When One has given up One's life	S07.05.026	1945	1.334		853	961
When Roses cease to bloom, Sir	F01.04.023	1896	2.005	3.039	32	8
When the Astronomer stops seeking	S07.04.022	1945	1.237		851	957
When they come back — if Blossoms do	S07.24.117	1929	3.067	6.059	1080	1042
When we have ceased to care					1706	1737
When we stand on the tops of Things	F16.03.008*	1945	1.527		242	343
Where bells no more affright the morn	F05.01.005	1945	1.214		112	114
Where every bird is bold to go		1896	4.022	4.104	1758	1179
Where I am not afraid to go	S07.11.055	1945	1.087		1037	986
Where I have lost, I softer tread	F07.02.007				104	158
Where Roses would not dare to go		1945	2.666		1582	1610
Where Ships of Purple — gently toss	F12.03.012	1891	3.042	2.042	265	296
Where Thou art — that — is Home	F36.04.014	1929	6.154	6.138	725	749
Whether my bark went down at sea	F03.04.020	1890	1.024	1.024	52	33
Whether they have forgotten		1945	1.401		1329	1334
Which is best? Heaven	S07.19.096	1945	1.549		1012	1021
Which is the best — the Moon or the Crescent?	S14.02.005	1945	1.548		1315	1376
Which misses most		1945	1.369		1759	1786
While Asters	F18.06.014	1896	3.001*	2.083	331	374
While it is alive	S06b.01.003	1945	1.336		491	287
While we were fearing it, it came		1896	1.015	1.098	1277	1317
White as an Indian Pipe					1250	1193
Who abdicated Ambush		1945	1.377		1616	1571
Who Court obtain within Himself	F38.05.014	1929	1.023	6.020	803	859
Who Giants know, with lesser Men	F38.01.003	1929	1.015	6.013	796	848
Who goes to dine must take his Feast	S08b.03.003	1945	1.439		1223	1219
Who has not found the Heaven — below		1896	1.017	1.100	1544	1609
Who is it seeks my Pillow Nights		1914	4.099	5.100	1598	1640
Who is the East?	S06b.08.033	1945	1.028		1032	1085
Who never lost, are unprepared	F06.01.001	1891	1.008	1.034	73	136
Who never wanted — maddest Joy		1896	1.048	1.131	1430	1447
Who occupies this House?	S06b.05.017	1945	1.389		892	1069
Who saw no Sunrise cannot say	S07.21.103	1945	1.007		1018	1028
Who were the Father and the Son		1914	4.109	5.111	1258	1280
Whoever disenchants		1945	1.204		1451	1475
Whole Gulfs — of Red, and Fleets — of Red	F22.04.013	1945	1.033		658	468
Whose are the little beds, I asked	F04.03.010	1891	3.010	2.010	142	85
Whose cheek is this?					82	48
Whose Pink career may have a close					1394	1427
Why — do they shut Me out of Heaven?	F11.08.017	1929	6.174	6.157	248	268
Why do I love You, Sir?	F22.02.004	1929	6.153	6.137	480	459
Why make it doubt — it hurts it so	F32.06.019	1929	4.107	6.096	462	697
Why should we hurry — why indeed?		1945	2.622		1646	1683
Wild Nights — Wild Nights!	F11.08.018	1891	2.007	3.025	249	269
Will there really be a Morning?	F07.01.004	1891	3.002	2.002	101	148
Winter is good — his Hoar Delights	S14.01.003	1945	1.074*		1316	1374
Winter under cultivation					1707	1720
Witchcraft has not a Pedigree		1914	1.010	5.010	1708	1712
Witchcraft was hung, in History		1945	1.588		1583	1612
With Pinions of Disdain		1945	1.375		1431	1448
With sweetness unabated					1709	1713
With thee, in the Desert	F10.02.008	1945	2.625		209	201
Within my Garden, rides a Bird	F18.04.009	1929	3.059	6.051	500	370
Within my reach!	F03.01.003	1890	1.007	1.007	90	69
Within that little Hive					1607	1633
Within thy Grave!		1945	1.398		1552	1582
Without a smile — Without a Throe		1945	1.061		1330	1340
Without this — there is nought	F22.03.009	1935	3.097	7.084	655	464
Wolfe demanded during dying	F23.02.004	1945	1.236		678	482
Wonder — is not precisely Knowing		1945	1.581		1331	1347
Would you like summer? Taste of ours.					691	272
Yesterday is History		1945	1.531		1292	1290
You cannot make Remembrance grow		1945	1.539		1508	1536
You cannot put a Fire out	F25.05.015	1896	1.050	1.133	530	583
You cannot take itself		1945	1.594		1351	1359
You constituted Time	F23.03.010	1945	1.331		765	488
You know that Portrait in the Moon	S01.02.004	1935	3.088	7.076	504	676
You left me — Sire — two Legacies	F33.06.016	1890	2.002	3.002	644	713
You love me — you are sure	F09.03.007	1945	2.637		156	218
You love the Lord — you cannot see	F22.05.019	1945	1.421		487	474
You said that I was Great — one Day	F35.08.025	1945	1.321		738	736
You see I cannot see — your lifetime	F13.02.003	1929	6.162	6.144	253	313
You taught me Waiting with Myself	F37.01.002	1929	6.170	6.153	740	774
You'll find — it when you try to die	F21.01.002	1929	4.105	6.094	610	441
You'll know Her — by Her Foot	F26.05.016	1945	1.115		634	604
You'll know it — as you know 'tis Noon	F15.03.007	1935	3.083	7.072	420	429
You're right — the way is narrow	F10.04.017	1945	2.617		234	249
You've seen Balloons set — Haven't You?	F35.05.016	1896	3.023	2.105	700	730
Your Riches — taught me — Poverty.	F14.05.014	1891	2.003	3.021	299	418
Your thoughts don't have words every day		1945	1.435		1452	1476
