= Hopi time controversy =

Academic debate about conceptualization of time in Hopi language

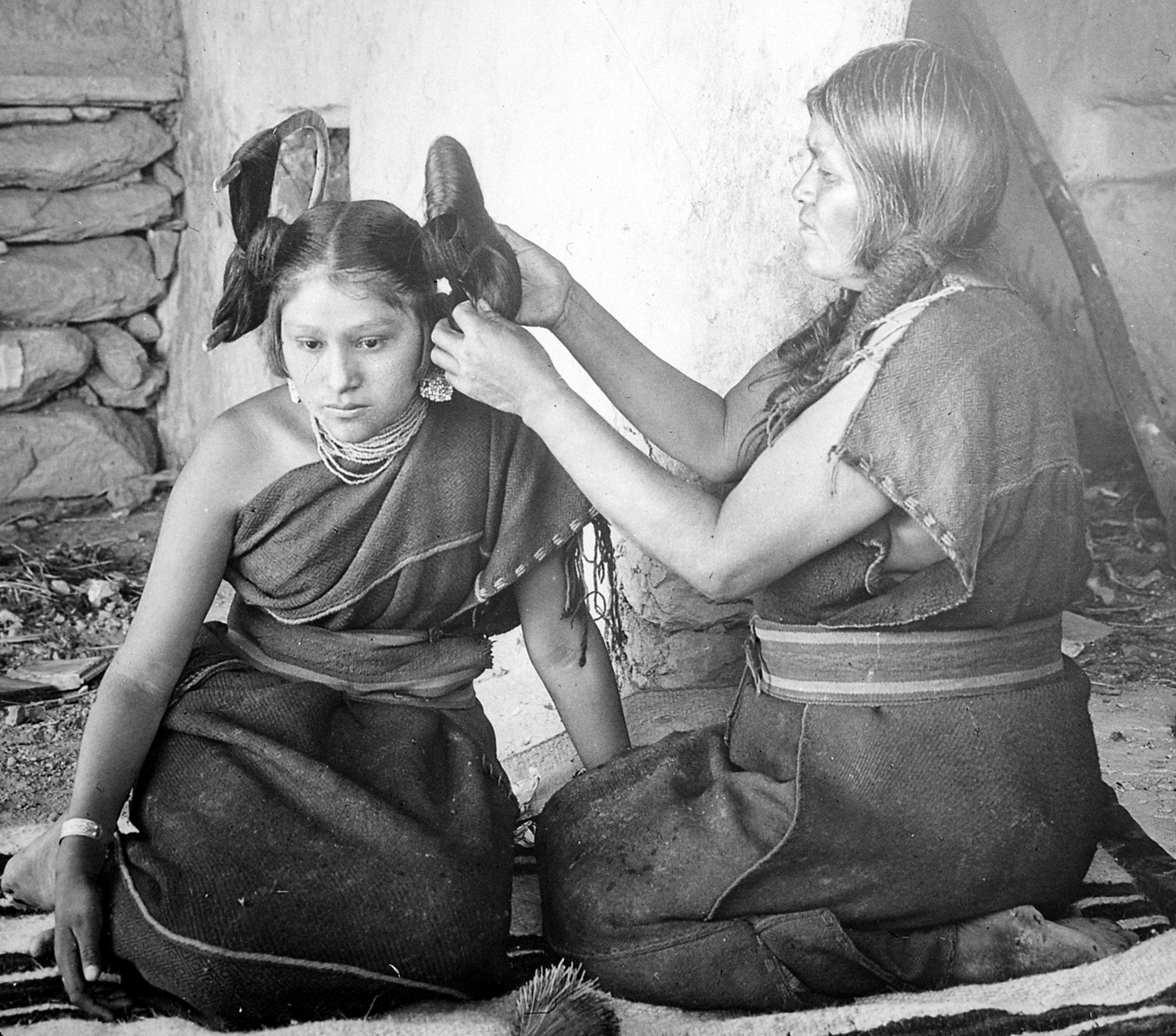
Hopi girl and woman, 1900.

The Hopi time controversy is the academic debate about how the Hopi language grammaticizes the concept of time, and about whether the differences between the ways the English and Hopi languages describe time are an example of linguistic relativity or not. In popular discourse, the debate is often framed as a question about whether the Hopi have a concept of time.

The debate originated in the 1940s when American linguist Benjamin Lee Whorf argued that the Hopi conceptualized time differently from the Standard Average European speaker, and that this difference correlated with grammatical differences between the languages. Whorf argued that Hopi has "no words, grammatical forms, construction or expressions that refer directly to what we call 'time'" and concluded that the Hopi had "no general notion or intuition of time as a smooth flowing continuum in which everything in the universe proceeds at equal rate, out of a future, through the present, into a past." Whorf used the Hopi concept of time as a primary example of his concept of linguistic relativity, which posits that the way in which individual languages encode information about the world influences and correlates with the cultural world view of the speakers. Whorf's relativist views fell out of favor in linguistics and anthropology in the 1960s, but Whorf's statement lived on in the popular literature often in the form of an urban myth that "the Hopi have no concept of time."

In 1983, linguist Ekkehart Malotki published a 600-page study of the grammar of time in the Hopi language, concluding that he had finally refuted Whorf's claims about the language. Malotki's treatise gave hundreds of examples of Hopi words and grammatical forms referring to temporal relations. Malotki's central claim was that the Hopi do indeed conceptualize time as structured in terms of a self-centered spatial progression from past, through present into the future. He also demonstrated that the Hopi language grammaticalizes tense using a distinction between future and non-future tenses, as opposed to the English tense system, which is usually analyzed as being based on a past/non-past distinction. Many took Malotki's work as a definitive refutation of the linguistic relativity hypothesis. Bernard Comrie, a linguist and specialist in the linguistic typology of tense, concluded that "Malotki's presentation and argumentation are devastating." Psychologist Steven Pinker, a well-known critic of Whorf and the concept of linguistic relativity, accepted Malotki's claims as having demonstrated Whorf's complete ineptitude as a linguist.

Subsequently, the study of linguistic relativity was revived using new approaches in the 1990s, and Malotki's study came under criticism from relativist linguists and anthropologists, who did not consider the study to invalidate Whorf's claims. The main issue of contention is the interpretation of Whorf's original claims about Hopi, and what exactly it was that he was claiming made Hopi different from what Whorf called "Standard Average European" languages. Some consider that the Hopi language may be best described as a tenseless language, and that the distinction between non-future and future posited by Malotki may be better understood as a distinction between realis and irrealis moods. Regardless of exactly how the Hopi concept of time is best analyzed, most specialists agree with Malotki that all humans conceptualize time by an analogy with space, although some recent studies have also questioned this.

== The Hopi language ==
The Hopi language, spoken by some 5,000 Hopi people in the Hopi Reservation in Northeastern Arizona, is a Native American language of the Uto-Aztecan language family.

In the large Hopi dictionary, there is no word exactly corresponding to the English noun "time." Hopi employs different words to refer to "a duration of time" (pàasa' "for that long"), to a point in time (pàasat "at that time"), and time as measured by a clock (pahàntawa), as an occasion to do something (hisat or qeni), a turn or the appropriate time for doing something (qeniptsi (noun)), and to have time for something (aw nánaptsiwta (verb)).

Time reference can be marked on verbs using the suffix -ni

- Momoyam piktota, "The women are/were making piki," Women piki-make
- Momoyam piktota-ni, "The women will be making piki," Women piki-make-NI

The -ni suffix is also used in the word naatoniqa, which means "that which will happen yet" in reference to the future. This word is formed from the adverb naato "yet"; the -ni suffix and the clitic -qa that forms a relative clause with the meaning "that which..."

The -ni suffix is also obligatory on the main verb in conditional clauses:

- Kur nu' pam tuwa nu' wuuvata-ni, "if I see him I'll run away," If I him see I run-NI

The suffix is also used in conditional clauses referring to a past context then often combined with the particle as that carries past tense or counterfactual meaning, or describes unachieved intent:

- Pam nuy tuwáq nu' so'on as wayaani, "If he had seen me I wouldn't have run," he me see I Neg Past/Counterfact. run-NI
- Nu' saytini, "I will smile," I smile-NI
- Nu' as saytini, "I tried to smile/I should smile/I wanted to smile/I was going to smile," I Past/Counterfact. smile-NI

The suffix -ngwu describes actions taking place habitually or as a general rule.

- Tömö' taawa tatkyaqw yámangwu, "In the winter the sun rises in the southeast"

== Benjamin Lee Whorf ==
Benjamin Lee Whorf (1897–1941), a fire prevention engineer by profession, studied Native American linguistics from an early age. He corresponded with many of the greatest scholars of his time, such as Alfred Tozzer at Harvard and Herbert Spinden of the American Museum of Natural History. They were impressed with his work on the linguistics of the Nahuatl language and encouraged him to participate professionally and to undertake field research in Mexico. In 1931 Edward Sapir, the foremost expert on Native American languages, started teaching at Yale, close to where Whorf lived, and Whorf signed up for graduate-level classes with Sapir, becoming one of his most respected students. Whorf took a special interest in the Hopi language and started working with Ernest Naquayouma, a speaker of Hopi from Toreva village on the Second Mesa of the Hopi Reservation in Arizona, who was living in the Manhattan borough of New York City. At this time, it was common for linguists to base their descriptions of a language on data from a single speaker. Whorf credited Naquayouma as the source of most of his information on the Hopi language, although in 1938 he took a short field trip to the village of Mishongnovi on the Second Mesa, collecting some additional data.

Whorf published several articles on Hopi grammar, focusing particularly on the ways in which the grammatical categories of Hopi encoded information about events and processes, and how this correlated with aspects of Hopi culture and behavior. After his death, his full sketch of Hopi grammar was published by his friend the linguist Harry Hoijer. Some of Whorf's essays on Native American linguistics, many of which had been previously published in academic journals, were collected in the 1956 anthology Language, Thought, and Reality by his friend psychologist John Bissell Carroll.

=== Whorf on Hopi time ===
Whorf's most frequently cited statement regarding Hopi time is the strongly worded introduction of his 1936 paper "An American Indian model of the Universe," which was first published posthumously in Carroll's edited volume. Here he writes that:

I find it gratuitous to assume that a Hopi who knows only the Hopi language and the cultural ideas of his own society has the same notions, often supposed to be intuitions, of time and space as we have, and that are generally assumed to be universal. In particular he has no notion or intuition of time as a smooth flowing continuum in which everything in the universe proceeds at an equal rate, out of a future into a present and into a past .... After a long and careful analysis the Hopi language is seen to contain no words, grammatical forms, construction or expressions that refer directly to what we call 'time', or to past, present or future ...

Whorf argues that in Hopi units of time are not represented by nouns, but by adverbs or verbs. Whorf argues that all Hopi nouns include the notion of a boundary or outline, and that consequently the Hopi language does not refer to abstract concepts with nouns. This, Whorf argues, is encoded in Hopi grammar, which does not allow durations of time to be counted in the same way objects are. So instead of saying, for example, "three days," Hopi would say the equivalent of "on the third day," using ordinal numbers. Whorf argues that the Hopi do not consider the process of time passing to produce another new day, but merely as bringing back the daylight aspect of the world.

==== Hopi as a tenseless language ====
Whorf gives slightly different analyses of the grammatical encoding of time in Hopi in his different writings. His first published writing on Hopi grammar was the paper "The punctual and segmentative aspects of verbs in Hopi," published in 1936 in Language, the journal of the Linguistic Society of America. Here Whorf analyzed Hopi as having a tense system with a distinction between three tenses: one used for past or present events (which Whorf calls the Factual tense or present-past); one for future events; and one for events that are generally or universally true (here called usitative). This analysis was repeated in a 1937 letter to J. B. Carroll, who later published it as part of his selected writings under the title "Discussion of Hopi Linguistics."

In the 1938 paper "Some verbal categories of Hopi," also published in Language, Whorf abandoned the word "tense" in the description of Hopi and described the distinction previously called "tense" with the label "assertions." Whorf described assertions as a system of categories that describe the speaker's claim of epistemic validity of his own statement. The three "assertions" of Hopi described by Whorf are the Reportive, Expective and Nomic forms of the Hopi verb. Whorf acknowledges that these "translate more or less [as] the English tenses," but maintains that these forms do not refer to time or duration, but rather to the speaker's claim of the validity of the statement. The reportive form is unmarked, whereas the expective form is marked with the verbal suffix -ni, and the nomic form with the suffix -ŋʷi. In Whorf's analysis, by using the reportive form the speaker claims that the event has in fact occurred or is still occurring, whereas by using the expective form the speaker describes an expectation of a future event. Whorf says that the expective can be used to describe events in the past, giving the meaning of "was going to" or "would."

In the 1940 article "Science and Linguistics," Whorf gave the same three-way classification based on the speaker's assertion of the validity of his statement: "The timeless Hopi verb does not distinguish between the present, past and future of the event itself but must always indicate what type of validity the speaker intends the statement to have: a. report of an event .. b. expectation of an event ..; c. generalization or law about events."

In his full sketch of Hopi grammar published posthumously in 1946, Whorf also described how adverbial particles contributed to the linguistic description of time in Hopi. He posited two subclasses of adverbs called temporals and tensors, which were used in sentences to locate events in time. A central claim in Whorf's work on linguistic relativity was that for the Hopi units of time were not considered objects that can be counted like most of the comparable English words that are described by nouns (a day, an hour etc.). He argued that only the Hopi word for "year" was a noun, the words for days and nights were ambivalent between noun and verbs, but that all other cyclic events and periods were described by adverbial particles used as modifiers for the sentence.

== The myth of the timeless Hopi ==
Whorf died in 1941, but his ideas took on their own life in academia and in the popular discourse on Native Americans. In 1958 Stuart Chase—an economist and engineer at MIT who had followed Whorf's ideas with great interest, but whom Whorf himself considered utterly incompetent and incapable of understanding the nuances of his ideas—published "Some things worth knowing: a generalist's guide to useful knowledge." Here he repeated Whorf's claim about Hopi time, but arguing that because of the Hopi view of time as a process, they were better able to understand the concept of time as a fourth dimension. Similarly, even scientists were intrigued by the thought that the idea of spatio-temporal unity that had taken Albert Einstein seven years to ponder, was readily available to the Hopi, simply because of the grammar of their language.

In 1964, John Greenway published a humorous portrait of American culture, The Inevitable Americans, in which he wrote: "You have a watch, because Americans are obsessed with time. If you were a Hopi Indian, you would have none, the Hopi have no concept of time." And even the 1971 ethnography of the Hopi by Euler and Dobyns claimed that "The English concept of time is nearly incomprehensible to the Hopi." The myth quickly became a staple element of New Age conceptualizations of the Hopi.

== Max Black and Helmut Gipper ==
In 1959, philosopher Max Black published a critique of Whorf's arguments in which he argued that the principle of linguistic relativity was obviously wrong because translation between languages is always possible, even when there are no exact correspondences between the single words or concepts in the two languages.

German linguist and philosopher Helmut Gipper had studied with the neo-Humboldtian linguist Leo Weisgerber and had a basically Kantian understanding of the relation between language and thought. Immanuel Kant considered the categories of time and space to be universals underlying all human thinking. Whorf's argument that the Hopi do not conceive of time and space as speakers of Indo-European languages do clashed with this basic understanding of cognition. Gipper went to the Hopi reservation to collect data for a general critique of Whorf's principle of linguistic relativity published in 1972. His critique included a refutation of Whorf's Hopi arguments. Gipper showed that the Hopi could refer to time, by juxtaposing Hopi phrases with their German equivalents that used words referring to units of time and to distinctions between past and present. Gipper also argued that several time intervals were described by nouns, and that these nouns could take the role of syntactic subject or object, in contradiction of Whorf's explicit statement. He argues that Whorf's assertion that intervals of time are not counted in the same way as objects is "questionable."

== Ekkehart Malotki ==
Ekkehart Malotki studied with Gipper at the Westfälische Wilhelms-Universität at Münster and his work was a continuation of his mentor's, spurred on by the frequent claims in the popular literature that "the Hopi have no concept of time." Malotki conducted four years of research on the Third Mesa, studying Hopi spatial and temporal reference. He published two large volumes, one in German, Hopi-Raum [Hopi space] and one in English, Hopi Time. For Malotki it was imperative to demonstrate two facts in contradiction of Whorf's claims: 1. that the Hopi language has an abundance of terms, words and constructions that refer to time. 2. that the Hopi do cognitively conceptualize time in analogy with physical space, using spatial metaphors to describe durations and units of time. He also wanted to demonstrate that Whorf misanalyzed several particularities regarding specific Hopi words and expressions. Malotki states that a main goal is to present "actual Hopi language data," since when he was writing very little textual data in Hopi had been published, and Whorf's publications were largely without text examples. Hopi Time opens with a quotation drawn from his extensive field work, which directly challenges Whorf's claim of a lack of temporal terms in the Hopi language: "Then [pu'] indeed, the following day, quite early in the morning at the hour when people pray to the sun, around that time then [pu'] he woke up the girl again."

=== Hopi Time (1983) ===
Most of Hopi Time is dedicated to the detailed description of the Hopi usage of words and constructions related to time. Malotki describes in detail the usage of a large amount of linguistic material: temporal adverbs, time units, time counting practices such as the Hopi calendar, the way that days are counted and time is measured.

The first part of the book describes "spatio-temporal metaphors;" in it he shows several deictic adverbs that are used to reference distance in both space and time, such as the word ep that means both "there" and "then." In the second chapter he describes the way in which the Hopi talk about units of time. He argues that in some contexts, specifically those of the ceremonial cycle, the Hopi do count days, using compound words such as payistala "the third day (of a ceremony)" composed of the morphemes paayo "three," s "times," and taala' "day/light," meaning literally "three-times-day." He also shows that the Hopi reckon time through the movement of the sun, having distinct words for the different degrees of light during the dawn and dusk periods. He also notes that the feeling of time passing can be described by saying "the sun moves slowly/quickly." Parts 3, 4, 5, and 6 describe Hopi time-keeping practices using the sun relative to the horizon, using the stars, the ceremonial calendar and the use of time-keeping devices such as knotted strings or notched sticks with a mark or knot for every day, sun-hole alignment and shadow observation. The eighth chapter describes the temporal particles that Whorf defined as temporals and tensors. He argues that Whorf's descriptions are vague and alienating.

==== Malotki on tense in Hopi ====
The concept of Hopi tense is covered in the last part of chapter 9, titled "miscellaneous," and in the conclusion. Malotki follows Gipper in arguing that time is a natural category and that it is naturally experienced in terms of past, present and future, even though many languages do not necessarily grammaticalize all of these distinctions. He analyzes the Hopi -ni suffix as marking the future tense. He argues that since there is no grammatical distinction between past and present, Hopi has a future-nonfuture tense system. Malotki distinguishes between primary and secondary functions of the -ni suffix, arguing that its primary function is temporal reference and that its many modal functions such as imperative, hortative and desiderative are of secondary importance.

As it turns out from among the numerous suffixes that the Hopi verb can select to mark the grammatical categories of aspect, mode and tense, one is specifically reserved to refer to time, or rather the sequential ordering of events or states. This temporal marker is -ni whose referential force is futurity. Its temporal function is primary; however, in many contexts i-ni also takes on a number of secondary, atemporal functions which essentially belong to the modal category (imperative, hortative, desiderative, etc.). Since no markers exist to point out present or past time, Hopi, like many other languages, can be said to be endowed with a future-nonfuture tense system.

Malotki does admit that the English and Hopi systems of tense are different since the English system distinguishes past from non-past, whereas Hopi distinguishes future from non-future.

== Further debates ==
Subsequent descriptions of Hopi grammar have maintained Malotki's distinction between an unmarked non-future tense and a future tense marked with the -ni suffix, and a habitual aspect marked by the suffix -ngwu. The review by Bernard Comrie, a well-known authority on the linguistic typology of tense and aspect, accepts that Malotki's work demonstrates that the Hopi do have a concept of time and that it is devastating for Whorf's strong claims. But Comrie also notes that Malotki's "claim that Hopi has a tense system based on the opposition of future and non-future ... strikes me as questionable: given the wide range of modal uses of the so-called future, it is at least plausible that this is a modal rather than temporal distinction, with the result that Hopi would have no tense distinction."

Linguists and psychologists who work in the universalist tradition such as Steven Pinker and John McWhorter, have seen Malotki's study as being the final proof that Whorf was an inept linguist and had no significant knowledge or understanding of the Hopi language. This interpretation has been criticized by relativist scholars as unfounded and based on a lack of knowledge of Whorf's work.

In spite of Malotki's refutation, the myth that "the Hopi have no concept of time" lived on in the popular literature. For example, in her 1989 novel Sexing the Cherry, Jeanette Winterson wrote of the Hopi: "...their language has no grammar in the way we recognize it. And most bizarre of all, they have no tenses for past, present and future. They do not sense time in that way. For them time is one." And the myth continues to be an integral part of New Age thinking that draws on stereotypical depictions of "timeless Hopi culture."

Some linguists working on Universals of semantics, such as Anna Wierzbicka and Cliff Goddard, argue that there is a Natural Semantic Metalanguage that has a basic vocabulary of semantic primes including concepts such as time, when, before, after. They have argued that Malotki's data show that the Hopi share these primes with English and all other languages, even though it is also clear that the precise way in which these concepts fit into the larger pattern of culture and language practices is different in each language, as illustrated by the differences between Hopi and English.

Historian of science G. E. R. Lloyd held that Malotki's investigation "made it abundantly clear that the Hopi had, and have, no difficulty whatsoever in drawing distinctions between past, present, and future." Some investigators of Puebloan astronomical knowledge have taken a compromise position, noting that while Malotki's study of Hopi temporal concepts and timekeeping practices "has clearly refuted Whorf's assertion that Hopi is a 'timeless' language, and in doing so has destroyed Whorf's strongest example for linguistic relativity, he presents no naively positivist assertion of the total independence of language and thought."

Malotki's work has been criticized by relativist scholars for failing to engage with Whorf's actual argument. John A. Lucy argues that Malotki's critique misses the fact that Whorf's point was exactly that the way in which the Hopi language grammatically structurates the representation of time leads to a different conception of time than the English one, not that they do not have one. Lucy notes that when Whorf makes his strong claim about what it is that Hopi lacks, he consistently puts the word "time" in scare quotes, and uses the qualifier "what we call." Lucy and others take this as evidence that Whorf was implying specifically that what the Hopi lacked was a concept that corresponds entirely to that denoted by the English word, i.e. he was making a point of showing that the concepts of time were different. Malotki himself acknowledges that the conceptualizations are different, but because he ignores Whorf's use of scare quotes, takes Whorf to be arguing that the Hopi have no concept of time at all.

In a book review of Hopi Time, Leanne Hinton echoes Lucy's observation that Malotki wrongly characterizes Whorf's claim that Hopi have no concept of time or cannot express time. She further claims that Malotki's glosses of Hopi often use English terms for time that do not exactly translate time terms (e.g., translating "three-repetitions" in Hopi as "three times"), thereby "mak[ing] the error of attributing temporality to any Hopi sentence that translates into English with a temporal term." Further, without delineating "Hopi views of time from the views expressed by English translations" "What is meant by the word 'time', and what are the criteria for determining whether or not a concept is temporal" is never answered by Malotki, thus begging the question.

In 1991, Penny Lee published a comparison of Malotki and Whorf's analyses of the adverbial word class that Whorf had called "tensors." She argues that Whorf's analysis captured aspects of Hopi grammar that were not captured by simply describing tensors as falling within the class of temporal adverbs.

In 2006, anthropologist David Dinwoodie published a severe critique of Malotki's work, questioning his methods and his presentation of data as well as his analysis. Dinwoodie argues that Malotki fails to adequately support his claim of having demonstrated that the Hopi have a concept of time "as we know it." He provides ethnographic examples of how some Hopi speakers explain the way they experience the difference between a traditional Hopi way of experiencing time as tied closely to cycles of ritual and natural events, and the Anglo-American concept of clock-time or school-time.

=== Language, time and cognition ===
Sparked by the Hopi debate about time, a number of studies about how different languages grammaticalize tense and conceptualize time have been carried out. Some of these studies in psycholinguistics and cognitive linguistics have found some evidence that there may be significant differences in how speakers of different languages conceptualize time, although not necessarily in the way Whorf claimed for the Hopi. Specifically, it has been shown that some cultural groups conceptualize the flow of time in a direction opposite to what is usual for speakers of English and other Indo-European languages, i.e. that the future is in front of the speaker and the past behind. It has also been well-established since before the controversy that not all languages have a grammatical category of tense: some instead use combinations of adverbs and grammatical aspect to locate events in time. Looked at from the perspective of the History of Science, Hopi conceptions of time and space, which underlie their well-developed observational solar calendar, raise the question of how to translate Hopi conceptions into terms intelligible to Western ears.

== See also ==
- Language and thought
- Linguistic determinism
- Linguistic relativity
