= Linguistic relativity =

Hypothesis of language influencing thought

Linguistic relativity asserts that language influences one's worldview and cognition. One form of linguistic relativity, linguistic determinism, regards peoples' languages as determining and influencing the scope of cultural perceptions of their surrounding world.

Various colloquialisms refer to linguistic relativism: the Whorf hypothesis; the Sapir–Whorf hypothesis (/səˌpɪər ˈhwɔːrf/ sə-PEER WHORF); the Whorf–Sapir hypothesis; and Whorfianism.

The hypothesis is disputed, with many different variations throughout its history. The strong hypothesis of linguistic relativity, now referred to as linguistic determinism, is that language determines thought and that linguistic categories limit and restrict cognitive categories. This was a claim by some earlier linguists pre-World War II; since then it has fallen out of acceptance by contemporary linguists. Nevertheless, research has produced positive empirical evidence supporting a weaker version of linguistic relativity: that a language's structures influence a speaker's perceptions, without strictly limiting or obstructing them.

Although common, the term Sapir–Whorf hypothesis is sometimes considered a misnomer for several reasons. Edward Sapir (1884–1939) and Benjamin Lee Whorf (1897–1941) never stated their ideas in terms of a hypothesis. The distinction between a weak and a strong version of this hypothesis is also a later development; Sapir and Whorf never used such a dichotomy, although often their writings and their opinions of this relativity principle expressed it in stronger or weaker terms.

The principle of linguistic relativity and the relationship between language and thought has also received attention in varying academic fields, including philosophy, psychology and anthropology. It has also influenced works of fiction and the invention of constructed languages.

== History ==
The idea was first expressed explicitly by 19th-century thinkers such as Wilhelm von Humboldt and Johann Gottfried Herder, who considered language as the expression of the spirit of a nation. Members of the early 20th-century school of American anthropology including Franz Boas and Edward Sapir also approved versions of the idea to a certain extent, including in a 1928 meeting of the Linguistic Society of America, but Sapir, in particular, wrote more often against than in favor of anything like linguistic determinism. Sapir's student, Benjamin Lee Whorf, came to be considered as the primary proponent as a result of his published observations of how he perceived linguistic differences to have consequences for human cognition and behavior. Harry Hoijer, another of Sapir's students, introduced the term "Sapir–Whorf hypothesis", even though the two scholars never formally advanced any such hypothesis. A strong version of relativist theory was developed from the late 1920s by the German linguist Leo Weisgerber. Whorf's principle of linguistic relativity was reformulated as a testable hypothesis by Roger Brown and Eric Lenneberg who performed experiments designed to determine whether color perception varies between speakers of languages that classified colors differently.

As the emphasis of the universal nature of human language and cognition developed during the 1960s, the idea of linguistic relativity became disfavored among linguists. From the late 1980s, a new school of linguistic relativity scholars has examined the effects of differences in linguistic categorization on cognition, finding broad support for non-deterministic versions of the hypothesis in experimental contexts. Some effects of linguistic relativity have been shown in several semantic domains, although they are generally weak. Currently, a nuanced opinion of linguistic relativity is espoused by most linguists holding that language influences certain kinds of cognitive processes in non-trivial ways, but that other processes are better considered as developing from connectionist factors.

=== Ancient philosophy to the Enlightenment ===
The idea that language and thought are intertwined is ancient. In his dialogue Cratylus, Plato explores the idea that conceptions of reality, such as Heraclitean flux, are embedded in language. But Plato argued against sophist thinkers such as Gorgias of Leontini, who claimed that the physical world cannot be experienced except through language; this made the question of truth dependent on aesthetic preferences or functional consequences. Plato may have held instead that the world consisted of eternal ideas and that language should represent these ideas as accurately as possible. Nevertheless, Plato's Seventh Letter claims that ultimate truth is inexpressible in words.

Following Plato, St. Augustine, for example, argued that language was merely like labels applied to concepts existing already. This opinion remained prevalent throughout the Middle Ages. Roger Bacon had the opinion that language was but a veil covering eternal truths, hiding them from human experience. For Immanuel Kant, language was but one of several methods used by humans to experience the world.

=== German Romantic philosophers ===
During the late 18th and early 19th centuries, the idea of the existence of different national characters, or Volksgeister, of different ethnic groups was a major motivator for the German romantics school and the beginning ideologies of ethnic nationalism.

==== Johann Georg Hamann ====
Johann Georg Hamann is often suggested to be the first among the actual German Romantics to discuss the concept of the "genius" of a language. In his "Essay Concerning an Academic Question", Hamann suggests that a people's language affects their worldview:

The lineaments of their language will thus correspond to the direction of their mentality.

Herder worked alongside Hamann to establish the idea of whether or not language had a human/rational or a divine origin. Herder added the emotional component of the hypothesis and Humboldt then took this information and applied it to various languages to expand on the hypothesis.

==== Wilhelm von Humboldt ====
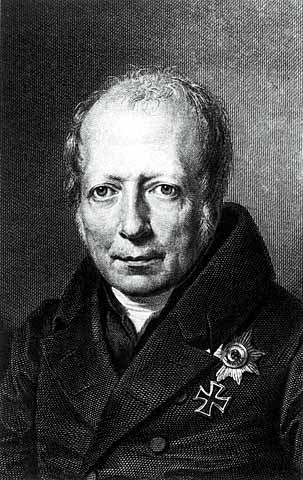
Wilhelm von Humboldt

In 1820, Wilhelm von Humboldt associated the study of language with the national romanticist program by proposing that language is the fabric of thought. Thoughts are produced as a kind of internal dialog using the same grammar as the thinker's native language. This opinion was part of a greater idea in which the assumptions of an ethnic nation, their "Weltanschauung", was considered as being represented by the grammar of their language. Von Humboldt argued that languages with an inflectional morphological type, such as German, English and the other Indo-European languages, were the most perfect languages and that accordingly this explained the dominance of their speakers with respect to the speakers of less perfect languages. Wilhelm von Humboldt declared in 1820:

The diversity of languages is not a diversity of signs and sounds but a diversity of views of the world.

In Humboldt's humanistic understanding of linguistics, each language creates the individual's worldview in its particular way through its lexical and grammatical categories, conceptual organization, and syntactic models.

=== Boas and Sapir ===
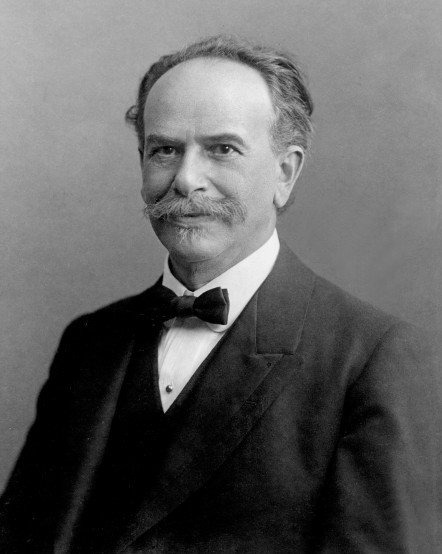
Franz Boas

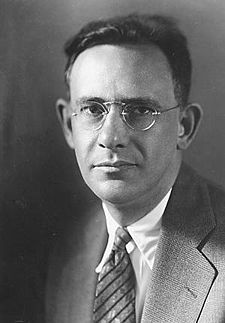
Edward Sapir

The idea that some languages are superior to others and that lesser languages maintained their speakers in intellectual poverty was widespread during the early 20th century. American linguist William Dwight Whitney, for example, actively strove to eradicate Native American languages, arguing that their speakers were savages and would be better off learning English and adopting a "civilized" way of life. The first anthropologist and linguist to challenge this opinion was Franz Boas. While performing geographical research in northern Canada he became fascinated with the Inuit and decided to become an ethnographer. Boas stressed the equal worth of all cultures and languages, that there was no such thing as a primitive language and that all languages were capable of expressing the same content, albeit by widely differing means. Boas saw language as an inseparable part of culture and he was among the first to require of ethnographers to learn the native language of the culture to be studied and to document verbal culture such as myths and legends in the original language.

Boas:

It does not seem likely [...] that there is any direct relation between the culture of a tribe and the language they speak, except in so far as the form of the language will be moulded by the state of the culture, but not in so far as a certain state of the culture is conditioned by the morphological traits of the language."

Boas' student Edward Sapir referred to the Humboldtian idea that languages were a major factor for understanding the cultural assumptions of peoples. He espoused the opinion that because of the differences in the grammatical systems of languages no two languages were similar enough to allow for perfect cross-translation. Sapir also thought because language represented reality differently, it followed that the speakers of different languages would perceive reality differently.

Sapir:

No two languages are ever sufficiently similar to be considered as representing the same social reality. The worlds in which different societies live are distinct worlds, not merely the same world with different labels attached.

However, Sapir explicitly rejected strong linguistic determinism by stating, "It would be naïve to imagine that any analysis of experience is dependent on pattern expressed in language."

Sapir was explicit that the associations between language and culture were neither extensive nor particularly profound, if they existed at all:

...it [is] easy to show that language and culture are not intrinsically associated. Totally unrelated languages share in one culture; closely related languages—even a single language—belong to distinct culture spheres. There are many excellent examples in Aboriginal America. The Athabaskan languages form as clearly unified, as structurally specialized, a group as any that I know of. The speakers of these languages belong to four distinct culture areas... The cultural adaptability of the Athabaskan-speaking peoples is in the strangest contrast to the inaccessibility to foreign influences of the languages themselves.

Sapir offered similar observations about speakers of so-called "world" or "modern" languages, noting, "possession of a common language is still and will continue to be a smoother of the way to a mutual understanding between England and America, but it is very clear that other factors, some of them rapidly cumulative, are working powerfully to counteract this leveling influence. A common language cannot indefinitely set the seal on a common culture when the geographical, physical, and economics determinants of the culture are no longer the same throughout the area."

While Sapir never made a practice of studying directly how languages affected thought, some notion of (probably "weak") linguistic relativity affected his basic understanding of language, and would be developed by Whorf.

=== Independent developments in Europe ===
Drawing on influences such as Humboldt and Friedrich Nietzsche, some European thinkers developed ideas similar to those of Sapir and Whorf, generally working in isolation from each other. Prominent in Germany from the late 1920s through the 1960s were the strongly relativist theories of Leo Weisgerber and his concept of a 'linguistic inter-world', mediating between external reality and the forms of a given language, in ways peculiar to that language. Russian psychologist Lev Vygotsky read Sapir's work and experimentally studied the ways in which the development of concepts in children was influenced by structures given in language. His 1934 work "Thought and Language" has been compared to Whorf's and taken as mutually supportive evidence of language's influence on cognition. Drawing on Nietzsche's ideas of perspectivism Alfred Korzybski developed the theory of general semantics that has been compared to Whorf's notions of linguistic relativity. Though influential in their own right, this work has not been influential in the debate on linguistic relativity, which has tended to be based on the American paradigm exemplified by Sapir and Whorf.

=== Benjamin Lee Whorf ===
More than any linguist, Benjamin Lee Whorf has become associated with what he termed the "linguistic relativity principle". Studying Native American languages, he attempted to account for the ways in which grammatical systems and language-use differences affected perception. Whorf's opinions regarding the nature of the relation between language and thought remain under contention. However, a version of theory holds some "merit", for example, "different words mean different things in different languages; not every word in every language has a one-to-one exact translation in a different language" Critics such as Lenneberg, Black, and Pinker attribute to Whorf a strong linguistic determinism, while Lucy, Silverstein and Levinson point to Whorf's explicit rejections of determinism, and where he contends that translation and commensuration are possible.

Detractors such as Lenneberg, Chomsky and Pinker criticized him for insufficient clarity of his description of how language influences thought, and for not proving his conjectures. Most of his arguments were in the form of anecdotes and speculations that served as attempts to show how "exotic" grammatical traits were associated with what were apparently equally exotic worlds of thought. In Whorf's words:

We dissect nature along lines laid down by our native language. The categories and types that we isolate from the world of phenomena we do not find there because they stare every observer in the face; on the contrary, the world is presented in a kaleidoscope flux of impressions which has to be organized by our minds—and this means largely by the linguistic systems of our minds. We cut nature up, organize it into concepts, and ascribe significances as we do, largely because we are parties to an agreement to organize it in this way—an agreement that holds throughout our speech community and is codified in the patterns of our language [...] all observers are not led by the same physical evidence to the same picture of the universe, unless their linguistic backgrounds are similar, or can in some way be calibrated.

Whorf's illustration of the difference between the English and Shawnee gestalt construction of cleaning a gun with a ramrod. From the article "Science and Linguistics", originally published in the MIT Technology Review, 1940.

=== Several terms for a single concept ===
Among Whorf's best-known examples of linguistic relativity are instances where a non-European language has several terms for a concept that is only described with one word in European languages (Whorf used the acronym SAE "Standard Average European" to allude to the rather similar grammatical structures of the well-studied European languages in contrast to the greater diversity of less-studied languages).

One of Whorf's examples was the supposedly large number of words for 'snow' in the Inuit languages, an example that later was contested as a misrepresentation.

Another is the Hopi language's words for water, one indicating drinking water in a container and another indicating a natural body of water.

These examples of polysemy served the double purpose of showing that non-European languages sometimes made more specific semantic distinctions than European languages and that direct translation between two languages, even of seemingly basic concepts such as snow or water, is not always possible.

Another example is from Whorf's experience as a chemical engineer working for an insurance company as a fire inspector. While inspecting a chemical plant he observed that the plant had two storage rooms for gasoline barrels, one for the full barrels and one for the empty ones. He further noticed that while no employees smoked cigarettes in the room for full barrels, no-one minded smoking in the room with empty barrels, although this was potentially much more dangerous because of the flammable vapors still in the barrels. He concluded that the use of the word empty in association to the barrels had resulted in the workers unconsciously regarding them as harmless, although consciously they were probably aware of the risk of explosion. This example was later criticized by Lenneberg as not actually demonstrating causality between the use of the word empty and the action of smoking, but instead was an example of circular reasoning. Pinker in The Language Instinct ridiculed this example, claiming that this was a failing of human insight rather than language.

=== Time in Hopi ===
Whorf's most elaborate argument for linguistic relativity regarded what he believed to be a fundamental difference in the understanding of time as a conceptual category among the Hopi. He argued that in contrast to English and other SAE languages, Hopi does not treat the flow of time as a sequence of distinct, countable instances, like "three days" or "five years", but rather as a single process and that consequently it has no nouns referring to units of time as SAE speakers understand them. He proposed that this view of time was fundamental to Hopi culture and explained certain Hopi behavioral patterns.

Ekkehart Malotki later claimed that he had found no evidence of Whorf's claims in 1980's era Hopi speakers, nor in historical documents dating back to the arrival of Europeans. Malotki used evidence from archaeological data, calendars, historical documents, and modern speech; he concluded that there was no evidence that Hopi conceptualize time in the way Whorf suggested. Many universalist scholars such as Pinker consider Malotki's study as a final refutation of Whorf's claim about Hopi, whereas relativist scholars such as John A Lucy and Penny Lee criticized Malotki's study for mischaracterizing Whorf's claims and for forcing Hopi grammar into a model of analysis that does not fit the data.

=== Structure-centered approach ===
Whorf's argument about Hopi speakers' conceptualization of time is an example of the structure-centered method of research into linguistic relativity, which Lucy identified as one of three main types of research of the topic. The "structure-centered" method starts with a language's structural peculiarity and examines its possible ramifications for thought and behavior. The defining example is Whorf's observation of discrepancies between the grammar of time expressions in Hopi and English. More recent research in this vein is Lucy's research describing how usage of the categories of grammatical number and of numeral classifiers in the Mayan language Yucatec result in Mayan speakers classifying objects according to material rather than to shape as preferred by English speakers. However, philosophers including Donald Davidson and Jason Josephson Storm have argued that Whorf's Hopi examples are self-refuting, as Whorf had to translate Hopi terms into English in order to explain how they are untranslatable.

=== Whorf dies ===
Whorf died in 1941 at age 44, leaving multiple unpublished papers. His ideas were continued by linguists and anthropologists such as Hoijer and Lee, who both continued investigating the effect of language on habitual thought, and Trager, who prepared a number of Whorf's papers for posthumous publishing. The most important event for the dissemination of Whorf's ideas to a larger public was the publication in 1956 of his major writings on the topic of linguistic relativity in a single volume titled Language, Thought and Reality.

=== Brown and Lenneberg ===
In 1953, Eric Lenneberg criticized Whorf's examples from an objectivist philosophy of language, claiming that languages are principally meant to represent events in the real world, and that even though languages express these ideas in various ways, the meanings of such expressions and therefore the thoughts of the speaker are equivalent. He argued that Whorf's English descriptions of a Hopi speaker's idea of time were in fact translations of the Hopi concept into English, therefore disproving linguistic relativity. However Whorf was concerned with how the habitual use of language influences habitual behavior, rather than translatability. Whorf's point was that while English speakers may be able to understand how a Hopi speaker thinks, they do not think in that way.

Lenneberg's main criticism of Whorf's works was that he never showed the necessary association between a linguistic phenomenon and a mental phenomenon. With Brown, Lenneberg proposed that proving such an association required directly matching linguistic phenomena with behavior. They assessed linguistic relativity experimentally and published their findings in 1954. Since neither Sapir nor Whorf had ever stated a formal hypothesis, Brown and Lenneberg formulated their own. Their two tenets were (i) "the world is differently experienced and conceived in different linguistic communities" and (ii) "language causes a particular cognitive structure". Brown later developed them into the so-called "weak" and "strong" formulation:

- Structural differences between language systems will, in general, be paralleled by nonlinguistic cognitive differences, of an unspecified sort, in the native speakers of the language.
- The structure of anyone's native language strongly influences or fully determines the worldview he will acquire as he learns the language.

Brown's formulations became known widely and were retrospectively attributed to Whorf and Sapir although the second formulation, verging on linguistic determinism, was never advanced by either of them.

=== Joshua Fishman's "Whorfianism of the third kind" ===
Joshua Fishman argued that Whorf's true assertion was largely overlooked. In 1978, he suggested that Whorf was a "neo-Herderian champion" and in 1982, he proposed "Whorfianism of the third kind" in an attempt to reemphasize what he claimed was Whorf's real interest, namely the intrinsic value of "little peoples" and "little languages". Whorf had criticized Ogden's Basic English thus:

But to restrict thinking to the patterns merely of English [...] is to lose a power of thought which, once lost, can never be regained. It is the 'plainest' English which contains the greatest number of unconscious assumptions about nature. [...] We handle even our plain English with much greater effect if we direct it from the vantage point of a multilingual awareness.

Where Brown's weak version of the linguistic relativity hypothesis proposes that language influences thought and the strong version that language determines thought, Fishman's "Whorfianism of the third kind" proposes that language is a key to culture.

=== Leiden school ===
The Leiden school is a linguistic theory that models languages as parasites. A notable proponent, Frederik Kortlandt, in a 1985 paper outlining Leiden school theory, advocates a form of linguistic relativity: "The observation that in all Yuman languages the word for 'work' is a loan from Spanish should be a major blow to any current economic theory." In the next paragraph, he quotes directly from Sapir: "Even in the most primitive cultures the strategic word is likely to be more powerful than the direct blow."

=== Rethinking Linguistic Relativity ===
The publication of the 1996 anthology Rethinking Linguistic Relativity edited by Gumperz and Levinson began a new period of linguistic relativity studies that emphasized cognitive and social aspects. The book included studies on linguistic relativity and universalist traditions. Levinson documented significant linguistic relativity effects in the different linguistic conceptualization of spatial categories in different languages. For example, men speaking the Guugu Yimithirr language in Queensland gave accurate navigation instructions using a compass-like system of north, south, east and west, along with a hand gesture pointing to the starting direction.

Lucy defines this method as "domain-centered" because researchers select a semantic domain and compare it across linguistic and cultural groups. Space is another semantic domain that has proven fruitful for linguistic relativity studies. Spatial categories vary greatly across languages. Speakers rely on the linguistic conceptualization of space in performing many ordinary tasks. Levinson and others reported three basic spatial categorizations. While many languages use combinations of them, some languages exhibit only one type and related behaviors. For example, Yimithirr only uses absolute directions when describing spatial relations—the position of everything is described by using the cardinal directions. Speakers define a location as "north of the house", while an English speaker may use relative positions, saying "in front of the house" or "to the left of the house".

Separate studies by Bowerman and Slobin analyzed the role of language in cognitive processes. Bowerman showed that some basic cognitive functions, such as early spatial reasoning and object categorization in infants, develop largely independently of language. This suggests that not all aspects of cognition are shaped by linguistic structures, and therefore some cognitive processes may fall outside the scope of linguistic relativity. Slobin described another kind of cognitive process that he named "thinking for speaking"—- the kind of process in which perceptional data and other kinds of prelinguistic cognition are translated into linguistic terms for communication. These, Slobin argues, are the kinds of cognitive process that are the basis of linguistic relativity.

== Colour terminology ==
=== Brown and Lenneberg ===
Since Brown and Lenneberg believed that the objective reality denoted by language was the same for speakers of all languages, they decided to test how different languages codified the same message differently and whether differences in codification could be proven to affect behavior. Brown and Lenneberg designed experiments involving the codification of colors. In their first experiment, they investigated whether it was easier for speakers of English to remember color shades for which they had a specific name than to remember colors that were not as easily definable by words. This allowed them to compare the linguistic categorization directly to a non-linguistic task. In a later experiment, speakers of two languages that categorize colors differently (English and Zuni) were asked to recognize colors. In this manner, it could be determined whether the differing color categories of the two speakers would determine their ability to recognize nuances within color categories. Brown and Lenneberg found that Zuni speakers who classify orange and yellow together as a single color did have trouble recognizing and remembering nuances within the orange/yellow category. This method, which Lucy later classified as domain-centered, is acknowledged to be sub-optimal, because color perception, unlike other semantic domains, is hardwired into the neural system and as such is subject to more universal restrictions than other semantic domains.

=== Hugo Magnus ===
In a similar study done by German ophthalmologist Hugo Magnus during the 1870s, he circulated a questionnaire to missionaries and traders with ten standardized color samples and instructions for using them. These instructions contained an explicit warning that failure of a language to distinguish lexically between two colors did not necessarily imply that speakers of that language did not distinguish the two colors perceptually. Magnus received completed questionnaires on twenty-five African, fifteen Asian, three Australian, and two European languages. He concluded in part, "As regards the range of the color sense of the primitive peoples tested with our questionnaire, it appears in general to remain within the same bounds as the color sense of the civilized nations. At least, we could not establish a complete lack of the perception of the so-called main colors as a special racial characteristic of any one of the tribes investigated for us. We consider red, yellow, green, and blue as the main representatives of the colors of long and short wavelength; among the tribes we tested not a one lacks the knowledge of any of these four colors" (Magnus 1880, p. 6, as trans. in Berlin and Kay 1969, p. 141). Magnus did find widespread lexical neutralization of green and blue, that is, a single word covering both these colors, as have all subsequent comparative studies of color lexicons.

=== Response to Brown and Lenneberg's study ===
Brown and Lenneberg's study began a tradition of investigation of linguistic relativity through color terminology. The studies showed a correlation between color term numbers and ease of recall in both Zuni and English speakers. Researchers attributed this to focal colors having greater codability than less focal colors, and not to linguistic relativity effects. Berlin/Kay found universal typological color principles that are determined by biological rather than linguistic factors. This study sparked studies into typological universals of color terminology. Researchers such as Lucy, Saunders and Levinson argued that Berlin and Kay's study does not refute linguistic relativity in color naming, because of unsupported assumptions in their study (such as whether all cultures in fact have a clearly defined category of "color") and because of related data problems. Researchers such as Maclaury continued investigation into color naming. Like Berlin and Kay, Maclaury concluded that the domain is governed mostly by physical-biological universals.

=== Berlin and Kay ===
Studies by Berlin and Kay continued Lenneberg's color research. They studied color terminology formation and showed clear universal trends in color naming. For example, they found that even though languages have different color terminologies, they generally recognize certain hues as more focal than others. They showed that in languages with few color terms, it is predictable from the number of terms which hues are chosen as focal colors: For example, languages with only three color terms always have the focal colors black, white, and red. The fact that what had been believed to be random differences between color naming in different languages could be shown to follow universal patterns was seen as a powerful argument against linguistic relativity. Berlin and Kay's research has since been criticized by relativists such as Lucy, who argued that Berlin and Kay's conclusions were skewed by their insistence that color terms encode only color information. This, Lucy argues, made them unaware of the instances in which color terms provided other information that might be considered examples of linguistic relativity.

== Universalism ==
Universalist scholars began a period of dissent from ideas about linguistic relativity. Lenneberg was one of the first cognitive scientists to begin development of the Universalist theory of language that was formulated by Chomsky as universal grammar, effectively arguing that all languages share the same underlying structure. The Chomskyan school also includes the belief that linguistic structures are largely innate and that what are perceived as differences between specific languages are surface phenomena that do not affect the brain's universal cognitive processes. This theory became the dominant paradigm of American linguistics from the 1960s through the 1980s, while linguistic relativity became the object of ridicule.

=== Ekkehart Malotki ===
Other universalist researchers dedicated themselves to dispelling other aspects of linguistic relativity, often attacking Whorf's specific examples. For example, Malotki's monumental study of time expressions in Hopi presented many examples that challenged Whorf's "timeless" interpretation of Hopi language and culture, but seemingly failed to address the linguistic relativist argument actually posed by Whorf (i.e. that the understanding of time by native Hopi speakers differed from that of speakers of European languages due to the differences in the organization and construction of their respective languages; Whorf never claimed that Hopi speakers lacked any concept of time). Malotki himself acknowledges that the conceptualizations are different, but because he ignores Whorf's use of quotes around the word "time" and the qualifier "what we call", takes Whorf to be arguing that the Hopi have no concept of time at all.

=== Steven Pinker ===
Currently many believers of the universalist school of thought still oppose linguistic relativity. For example, Pinker argues in The Language Instinct that thought is independent of language, that language is itself meaningless in any fundamental way to human thought, and that human beings do not even think in "natural" language, i.e. any language that we actually communicate in; rather, we think in a meta-language, preceding any natural language, termed "mentalese". Pinker attacks what he terms "Whorf's radical position", declaring, "the more you examine Whorf's arguments, the less sense they make".

Pinker and other universalists have been accused by relativists of misrepresenting Whorf's ideas and committing the strawman fallacy.

== Cognitive linguistics ==
During the late 1980s and early 1990s, advances in cognitive psychology and cognitive linguistics renewed interest in the Sapir–Whorf hypothesis. One of those who adopted a more Whorfian philosophy was George Lakoff. He argued that language is often used metaphorically and that languages use different cultural metaphors that reveal something about how speakers of that language think. For example, English employs conceptual metaphors likening time to money, so that time can be saved and spent and invested, whereas other languages do not talk about time in that manner. Other such metaphors are common to many languages because they are based on general human experience, for example, metaphors associating up with good and bad with down. Lakoff also argued that metaphor plays an important part in political debates such as the "right to life" or the "right to choose"; or "illegal aliens" or "undocumented workers".

An unpublished study by Boroditsky et al. in 2003 reported finding empirical evidence favoring the hypothesis and demonstrating that differences in languages' systems of grammatical gender can affect the way speakers of those languages think about objects. Speakers of Spanish and German (which have different gender systems) were asked to use adjectives to describe various objects designated by words that were either masculine or feminine in their respective languages. Speakers tended to describe objects in ways that were consistent with the gender of the noun in their language, indicating that the gender system of a language can influence speakers' perceptions of objects. Despite numerous citations, the experiment was criticised after the reported effects could not be replicated by independent trials. Additionally, a large-scale data analysis using word embeddings of language models found no correlation between adjectives and inanimate noun genders, while another study using large text corpora found a slight correlation between the gender of animate and inanimate nouns and their adjectives as well as verbs by measuring their mutual information.

Colin Murray Turbayne also argued that the pervasive use of ancient "dead metaphors" by researchers within different linguistic traditions has contributed to needless confusion in the development of modern empirical theories over time. He points to several examples within the Romance and Germanic languages of the subtle manner in which mankind has become unknowingly victimized by such "unmasked metaphors". Cases include the incorporation of mechanistic metaphors first introduced by Rene Descartes and Isaac Newton during the 17th century into scientific theories which were subsequently developed by George Berkeley, David Hume and Immanuel Kant during the 18th century; and the influence exerted by Platonic metaphors in the dialogue Timaeus upon the development of contemporary theories of language in modern times.

=== Parameters ===
In his 1987 book Women, Fire, and Dangerous Things: What Categories Reveal About the Mind, Lakoff reappraised linguistic relativity and especially Whorf's ideas about how linguistic categorization represents and/or influences mental categories. He concluded that the debate had been confused. He identified four parameters on which researchers differed in their opinions about what constitutes linguistic relativity:

- The degree and intensity of linguistic relativity. Perhaps a few examples of superficial differences in language and associated behavior are enough to demonstrate the existence of linguistic relativity. Alternatively, perhaps only great differences that permeate the linguistic and cultural system suffice.
- Whether conceptual systems are absolute or whether they can evolve.
- Whether the similarity criterion is translatability or the use of linguistic expressions.
- Whether the emphasis of linguistic relativity is language or the brain.

Lakoff concluded that many of Whorf's critics had criticized him using novel definitions of linguistic relativity, rendering their criticisms moot.

== Refinements ==
Researchers such as Boroditsky, Choi, Majid, Lucy and Levinson believe that language influences thought in more limited ways than the broadest early claims. Researchers examine the interface between thought (or cognition), language and culture and describe the relevant influences. They use experimental data to back up their conclusions. Kay ultimately concluded that "[the] Whorf hypothesis is supported in the right visual field but not the left". His findings show that accounting for brain lateralization offers another perspective.

=== Behavior-centered research ===
Recent studies have also used a "behavior-based" method, which starts by comparing behavior across linguistic groups and then searches for causes for that behavior in the linguistic system. In an early example of this method, Whorf attributed the occurrence of fires at a chemical plant to the workers' use of the word 'empty' to describe barrels containing only explosive vapors.

More recently, Bloom noticed that speakers of Chinese had unexpected difficulties answering counterfactual questions posed to them in a questionnaire. He concluded that this was related to the way in which counter-factuality is marked grammatically in Chinese. Other researchers attributed this result to Bloom's flawed translations. Strømnes examined why Finnish factories had a greater occurrence of work related accidents than similar Swedish ones. He concluded that cognitive differences between the grammatical usage of Swedish prepositions and Finnish cases could have caused Swedish factories to pay more attention to the work process while Finnish factory organizers paid more attention to the individual worker.

==== Numbers and classifiers ====
Everett's work on the Pirahã language of the Brazilian Amazon found several peculiarities that he interpreted as corresponding to linguistically rare features, such as a lack of numbers and color terms in the way those are otherwise defined and the absence of certain types of clauses. Everett's conclusions were met with skepticism from universalists who claimed that the linguistic deficit is explained by the lack of need for such concepts.

Recent research with non-linguistic experiments in languages with different grammatical properties (e.g., languages with and without numeral classifiers or with different gender grammar systems) showed that language differences in human categorization are due to such differences. Experimental research suggests that this linguistic influence on thought diminishes over time, as when speakers of one language are exposed to another.

==== Time perception ====
Research on time-space congruency suggests that temporal perception is shaped by spatial metaphors embedded in language. Casasanto & Boroditsky (2008) found that people often use spatial metaphors to conceptualize time, linking longer distances with longer durations. Research has shown that linguistic differences can influence the perception of time. Swedish, like English, tends to describe time in terms of spatial distance (e.g., "a long meeting"), whereas Spanish often uses quantity-based metaphors (e.g., "a big meeting"). These linguistic patterns correlate with differences in how speakers estimate temporal durations: Swedish speakers are more influenced by spatial length, while Spanish speakers are more sensitive to volume.

Expanding on this, research on time-space congruency suggests that temporal perception is shaped by spatial metaphors embedded in language. In many languages, time is conceptualized along a horizontal axis (e.g., "looking forward to the future" in English). However, Mandarin speakers also employ vertical metaphors for time, referring to earlier events as "up" and later events as "down". Experiments have shown that Mandarin speakers are quicker to recognize temporal sequences when they are presented vertically, whereas English speakers exhibit no such bias.

==== Pronoun-dropping and intentionality ====
Kashima & Kashima observed a correlation between the perceived individualism or collectivism in the social norms of a given country, with the tendency to neglect the use of pronouns in the country's language. They argued that explicit reference to "you" and "I" reinforces a distinction between the self and the other in the speaker.

Research also suggests that this structural difference influences how speakers attribute intentionality in events. Fausey & Boroditsky (2010) conducted experiments comparing how English and Spanish speakers describe accidental versus intentional actions. Their results showed that English speakers, who are accustomed to using explicit pronouns, were more likely to specify the agent responsible for an accidental event (e.g., "John broke the vase"). In contrast, Spanish speakers, who frequently omit pronouns, were more likely to use agent-neutral descriptions for accidental events (e.g., "The vase broke").

==== Future tense ====
A 2013 study found that those who speak "futureless" languages with no grammatical marking of the future tense save more, retire with more wealth, smoke less, practice safer sex, and are less obese than those who do not. This effect has come to be termed the linguistic-savings hypothesis and has been replicated in several cross-cultural and cross-country studies. However, a study of Chinese, which can be spoken both with and without the grammatical future marking "will", found that subjects do not behave more impatiently when "will" is used repetitively. This laboratory-based finding of elective variation within a single language does not refute the linguistic savings hypothesis but some have suggested that it shows the effect may be due to culture or other non-linguistic factors.

=== Psycholinguistic research ===
Psycholinguistic studies explored motion perception, emotion perception, object representation and memory. The gold standard of psycholinguistic studies on linguistic relativity is now finding non-linguistic cognitive differences in speakers of different languages (thus rendering inapplicable Pinker's criticism that linguistic relativity is "circular").

Recent work with bilingual speakers attempts to distinguish the effects of language from those of culture on bilingual cognition including perceptions of time, space, motion, colors, and emotion. Researchers described differences between bilinguals and monolinguals in perception of color, representations of time and other elements of cognition.

== Other domains ==
Linguistic relativity inspired others to consider whether thought and emotion could be influenced by manipulating language.

=== Science and philosophy ===
A major question is whether human psychological faculties are mostly innate or whether they are mostly a result of learning, and hence subject to cultural and social processes such as language. The innate opinion is that humans share the same set of basic faculties, variability due to cultural differences is less important, and the human mind is a mostly biological construction, so all humans who share the same neurological configuration can be expected to have similar cognitive patterns.

Multiple alternatives have advocates. The contrary constructivist position holds that human faculties and concepts are largely influenced by socially constructed and learned categories, without many biological restrictions. Another variant is idealist, which holds that human mental capacities are generally unrestricted by biological-material structures. Another is the essentialist position, which holds that inherent biological or psychological differences between individuals or groups, such as genetic, neurological, or cognitive traits, may influence how they experience and conceptualize the world. Yet another is relativist (cultural relativism), which sees different cultural groups as employing different conceptual schemes that are not necessarily compatible or commensurable, nor more or less in accord with external reality.

Another debate considers whether thought is a type of internal speech or is independent of and prior to language.

In the philosophy of language, the question addresses the relations between language, knowledge and the external world, and the concept of truth. Philosophers such as Putnam, Fodor, Davidson, and Dennett see language as directly representing entities from the objective world, and categorization as reflecting that world. Other philosophers (e.g. Quine, Searle, and Foucault) argue that categorization and conceptualization is subjective and arbitrary. Another view, represented by Jason Storm, seeks a third way by emphasizing how language changes and imperfectly represents reality without being completely divorced from ontology.

Another question is whether language is a tool for representing and referring to objects in the world, or whether it is a system used to construct mental representations that can be communicated.

=== Therapy and self-development ===
Sapir/Whorf contemporary Alfred Korzybski was independently developing his theory of general semantics, which was intended to use language's influence of thinking to maximize human cognitive abilities. Korzybski's thinking was influenced by logical philosophy such as Russell and Whitehead's Principia Mathematica and Wittgenstein's Tractatus Logico-Philosophicus. Although Korzybski was not aware of Sapir and Whorf's writings, the philosophy was adopted by Whorf-admirer Stuart Chase, who fused Whorf's interest in cultural-linguistic variation with Korzybski's programme in his popular work "The Tyranny of Words". S. I. Hayakawa was a follower and popularizer of Korzybski's work, writing Language in Thought and Action. The general semantics philosophy influenced the development of neuro-linguistic programming (NLP), another therapeutic technique that seeks to use awareness of language use to influence cognitive patterns.

Korzybski independently described a "strong" version of the hypothesis of linguistic relativity.

We do not realize what tremendous power the structure of an habitual language has. It is not an exaggeration to say that it enslaves us through the mechanism of s[emantic] r[eactions] and that the structure which a language exhibits, and impresses upon us unconsciously, is automatically projected upon the world around us.

— Korzybski (1930)

=== Artificial languages ===
In their fiction, authors such as Ayn Rand and George Orwell explored how linguistic relativity might be exploited for political purposes. In Rand's Anthem, a fictive communist society removed the possibility of individualism by removing the word "I" from the language. In Orwell's 1984 the authoritarian state created the language Newspeak to make it impossible for people to think critically about the government, or even to contemplate that they might be impoverished or oppressed, by reducing the number of words to reduce the thought of the locutor.

Others have been fascinated by the possibilities of creating new languages that could enable new, and perhaps better, ways of thinking. Examples of such languages designed to explore the human mind include Loglan, explicitly designed by James Cooke Brown to test the linguistic relativity hypothesis, by exploring whether it would make its speakers think more logically. Suzette Haden Elgin, who was involved with the early development of neuro-linguistic programming, invented the language Láadan to explore linguistic relativity by making it easier to express what Elgin considered the female worldview, as opposed to Standard Average European languages, which she considered to convey a "male centered" worldview. John Quijada's language Ithkuil was designed to explore the limits of the number of cognitive categories a language can keep its speakers aware of at once. Similarly, Sonja Lang's Toki Pona was developed according to a Taoist philosophy for exploring how (or if) such a language would direct human thought.

=== Programming languages ===
APL programming language originator Kenneth E. Iverson believed that the Sapir–Whorf hypothesis applied to computer languages (without actually mentioning it by name). His Turing Award lecture, "Notation as a Tool of Thought", was devoted to this theme, arguing that more powerful notations aided thinking about computer algorithms.

The essays of Paul Graham explore similar themes, such as a conceptual hierarchy of computer languages, with more expressive and succinct languages at the top. Thus, the so-called blub paradox (after a hypothetical programming language of average complexity called Blub) says that anyone preferentially using some particular programming language will know that it is more powerful than some, but not that it is less powerful than others. The reason is that writing in some language means thinking in that language. Hence the paradox, because typically programmers are "satisfied with whatever language they happen to use, because it dictates the way they think about programs".

In a 2003 presentation at an open source convention, Yukihiro Matsumoto, creator of the programming language Ruby, said that one of his inspirations for developing the language was the science fiction novel Babel-17, based on the Whorf Hypothesis.

=== Science fiction ===
Numerous examples of linguistic relativity have appeared in science fiction.

- The totalitarian regime depicted in George Orwell's 1949 novel Nineteen Eighty Four in effect acts on the basis of the Whorf hypothesis, seeking to replace English with Newspeak, a language constructed specifically with the intention that thoughts subversive of the regime cannot be expressed in it, and therefore people educated to speak and think in it would not have such thoughts.
- In his 1958 science fiction novel The Languages of Pao the author Jack Vance describes how specialized languages are a major part of a strategy to create specific classes in a society, to enable the population to withstand occupation and develop itself.
- In Samuel R. Delany's 1966 science fiction novel Babel-17, the author describes an advanced, information-dense language that can be used as a weapon. Learning it turns one into an unwilling traitor as it alters perception and thought.
- Ted Chiang's 1998 short story "Story of Your Life" developed the concept of the Whorf hypothesis as applied to an alien species that visits Earth. The aliens' biology contributes to their spoken and written languages, which are distinct. In the 2016 American movie Arrival, based on Chiang's short story, the Whorf hypothesis is the premise. The protagonist explains that "the Sapir–Whorf hypothesis is the theory that the language you speak determines how you think".
- Gene Wolfe's four volume science fiction novel The Book of the New Sun describes the North American "Ascian" people as speaking a language composed entirely of quotations that have been approved by a small ruling class.

=== Sociolinguistics and linguistic relativity ===
Sociolinguistics affects some variables within language, including the manner in which words are pronounced, word selection in certain dialogue, context, and tone. It's suggested that these effects may have implications for linguistic relativity.

== See also ==
- A rose by any other name would smell as sweet – Adage from Romeo and Juliet
- Basic Color Terms: Their Universality and Evolution – Linguistics book by Brent Berlin and Paul Kay
- Bicameral mentality – Hypothesis in psychology
- Color term – Word or phrase that refers to a specific color
- Eskimo words for snow – Linguistic cliché
- Ethnolinguistics – Academic discipline
- Hopi time controversy – Academic debate about conceptualization of time in Hopi language
- Hypocognition – Inability to communicate due to no words for a concept
- Inherently funny words – Words which have been described as inherently funny
- Labeling theory – Sociological theory
- Language and thought – Study of how language influences thought
- Language planning – Deliberate effort to influence languages or their varieties within a speech community
- Linguistic anthropology – Study of how language influences social life
- Linguistic determinism – Idea of language as the principal framework in dictating human thought
- Logocracy – Form of government by use of words
- Psycholinguistics – Study of relations between psychology and language
- Relativism – Philosophical view rejecting objectivity
- Terministic screen – Term in the theory and criticism of rhetoric

== Sources ==
- Ahearn, Laura M. (21 March 2011). Living Language: An Introduction to Linguistic Anthropology. John Wiley & Sons. ISBN 978-1-4443-4054-9.
- Andrews, David R. (1994), "The Russian Color Categories Sinij and Goluboj: An Experimental Analysis of Their Interpretation in the Standard and Emigré Languages", Journal of Slavic Linguistics, 2 (1): 9–28, JSTOR 24599022
- Athanasopoulos, Panos (2009), "Cognitive representation of colour in bilinguals: The case of Greek blues", Bilingualism: Language and Cognition, 12 (1): 83–95, doi:10.1017/S136672890800388X, S2CID 145526128
- Berlin, Brent; Kay, Paul (1969), Basic Color Terms: Their Universality and Evolution, Berkeley: University of California Press
- Boroditsky, Lera; Ham, Wendy; Ramscar, Michael (2002), "What is universal in event perception? Comparing English & Indonesian speakers", in W. D. Gray; C. D. Schunn (eds.), Proceedings of the Twenty-Fourth Annual Conference of the Cognitive Science Society, Mahwah, NJ: Lawrence Erlbaum Associates
- Brown, R.; Lenneberg, Eric (1954), "A study in language and cognition", Journal of Abnormal and Social Psychology, 49 (3): 454–462, doi:10.1037/h0057814, PMID 13174309
- Brown, R. (1976), "In Memorial Tribute to Eric Lenneberg", Cognition, 4 (2): 125–153, doi:10.1016/0010-0277(76)90001-9, S2CID 53169722
- Casasanto, Daniel (2008), "Who's Afraid of the Big Bad Whorf? Crosslinguistic Differences in Temporal Language and Thought", Language Learning, 58 (1): 79, doi:10.1111/j.1467-9922.2008.00462.x, hdl:11858/00-001M-0000-0014-6D70-1, S2CID 8908681
- Cook, Vivian; Bassetti, Benedetta (2010), Language and Bilingual Cognition, Hove: Psychology Press
- D'Andrade, Roy G. (27 January 1995). The Development of Cognitive Anthropology. Cambridge University Press. ISBN 978-0-521-45976-1.
- Darnell, Regna (1990). Edward Sapir: Linguist, Anthropologist, Humanist. University of California Press. ISBN 978-0-520-06678-6.
- Dinwoodie, David W. (2006), "Time and the Individual in Native North America", in Kan, Sergei; Strong, Pauline Turner; Fogelson, Raymond (eds.), New Perspectives on Native North America: Cultures, Histories, And Representations, U of Nebraska
- Drivonikou, G. V.; Kay, P.; Regier, T.; Ivry, R. B.; Gilbert, A. L.; Franklin, A.; Davies, I. R. L. (2007), "Further evidence that Whorfian effects are stronger in the right visual field than the left", Proceedings of the National Academy of Sciences of the United States of America, 104 (3): 1097–1102, Bibcode:2007PNAS..104.1097D, doi:10.1073/pnas.0610132104, PMC 1783370, PMID 17213312
- Everett, Caleb (2013), Linguistic Relativity: Evidence Across Languages and Cognitive Domains, Berlin: De Gruyter Mouton
- Fishman, Joshua A. (1978), "Positive bilingualism: Some overlooked rationales and forefathers", in J. E. Alatis (ed.), International dimensions of bilingual education, Washington, D.C.: Georgetown University Press, pp. 42–52
- Fishman, Joshua A. (1982), "Whorfianism of the third kind: Ethnolinguistic diversity as a worldwide societal asset", Language in Society, 11: 1–14, doi:10.1017/S0047404500009015, S2CID 146708672
- Gilbert, A.; Regier, T.; Kay, P.; Ivry, R. (2008), "Support for lateralization of the Whorf effect beyond the realm of color discrimination" (PDF), Brain and Language, 105 (2): 91–98, doi:10.1016/j.bandl.2007.06.001, PMID 17628656, S2CID 9285112
- Graham, Paul (2004). "Beating the Averages". Hackers & Painters: Big Ideas from the Computer Age. O'Reilly Media, Inc. ISBN 978-0-596-00662-4.
- Gumperz, John; Levinson, Stephen, eds. (1996), Rethinking Linguistic Relativity, Cambridge: Cambridge University Press
- Hill, Jane H; Mannheim, Bruce (1992), "Language and World view", Annual Review of Anthropology, 21: 381–406, doi:10.1146/annurev.an.21.100192.002121
- Hoijer, Harry, ed. (1954), Language in culture: Conference on the interrelations of language and other aspects of culture, Chicago: University of Chicago Press
- Koerner, E. F. Konrad (1992), "The Sapir–Whorf Hypothesis: A Preliminary History and a Bibliographical Essay", Journal of Linguistic Anthropology, 2 (2): 173–198, doi:10.1525/jlin.1992.2.2.173, JSTOR 43102168
- Lakoff, George (1987), Women, fire, and dangerous things, University of Chicago Press
- Leavitt, John Harold (2010). Linguistic relativities: language diversity and modern thought. Cambridge, UK: Cambridge University Press. ISBN 978-0-511-99268-1. OCLC 699490918.
- Leavitt, John (2011), Linguistic Relativities: Language Diversity and Modern Thought, Cambridge, UK: Cambridge University Press, ISBN 978-0-521-76782-8
- Lee, Penny (1 January 1996). The Whorf Theory Complex: A Critical Reconstruction. John Benjamins Publishing. ISBN 978-90-272-4569-4.
- Lenneberg, Eric; Brown, A. M. (1956), "The Language of Experience: a Study in Methodology", Indiana University Publications in Anthropology and Linguistics
- Lenneberg, Eric (1953), "Cognition in Ethnolinguistics", Language, 29 (4): 463–471, doi:10.2307/409956, JSTOR 409956
- Levinson, Stephen C. (1996), "Language and Space", Annual Review of Anthropology, 25: 353–82, doi:10.1146/annurev.anthro.25.1.353, hdl:11858/00-001M-0000-0013-2B64-6, S2CID 8050166
- Levinson, Stephen C. (1998), "Studying Spatial Conceptualization across Cultures: Anthropology and Cognitive Science", Ethos, 26 (1): 7–24, doi:10.1525/eth.1998.26.1.7, hdl:11858/00-001M-0000-0013-2ABE-6, JSTOR 640692, S2CID 53751699
- Levinson, Stephen C. (2000), "Yeli Dnye and the Theory of Basic Color Terms" (PDF), Journal of Linguistic Anthropology, 10 (1): 3–55, doi:10.1525/jlin.2000.10.1.3, hdl:11858/00-001M-0000-0013-2A6B-F
- Levinson, Stephen C. (2012), "Foreword", in Carroll, John B; Levinson, Stephen C; Lee, Penny (eds.), Language, Thought and Reality (2nd ed.), Cambridge, Massachusetts/London, UK: MIT Press, pp. vii–xxiii, ISBN 978-0-262-51775-1
- Lucy, John A. (1992a), Grammatical Categories and Cognition: A Case Study of the Linguistic Relativity Hypothesis, Cambridge: Cambridge University Press
- Lucy, John A. (1992b), Language Diversity and Thought: A Reformulation of the Linguistic Relativity Hypothesis, Cambridge: Cambridge University Press
- Lucy, John A. (1997), "Linguistic Relativity" (PDF), Annual Review of Anthropology, 26: 291–312, doi:10.1146/annurev.anthro.26.1.291, JSTOR 2952524
- Lucy, John A. (1996), "The Scope of Linguistic Relativity:An analysis of Empirical Research", in Gumperz, John; Levinson, Stephen (eds.), Rethinking Linguistic Relativity, Cambridge: Cambridge University Press, pp. 37–69
- Lucy, J. A.; Wertsch, J. (1987), "Vygotsky and Whorf: A comparative analysis", in Hickmann, M. (ed.), Social and functional approaches to language and thought, Cambridge, UK: Cambridge University Press., pp. 67–86
- Malotki, Ekkehart (1983), "Hopi Time: A Linguistic Analysis of the Temporal Concepts in the Hopi Language", in Werner Winter (ed.), Trends in Linguistics. Studies and Monographs, vol. 20, ISBN 978-90-279-3349-2
- McAfee, Christina (2004), "The Linguistic Relativity Theory and Benjamin Lee Whorf", The McMaster Journal of Communication, 1 (1): 26–31, doi:10.15173/mjc.v1i0.221
- Migge, Bettina; Léglise, Isabelle (2007), "Language and colonialism", in Hellinger, Marlis; Pauwels, Anne (eds.), Handbook of Language and Communication: Diversity and Change, Handbooks of Applied Linguistics, De Gruyter Mouton, doi:10.1515/9783110198539.2.299, hdl:10197/8009, ISBN 978-3-11-019853-9
- Niemeier, Susanne (2000), René Dirven (ed.), Evidence for linguistic relativity, John Benjamins Publishing Company, ISBN 978-90-272-3705-7
- Pavlenko, Aneta (1999), "New approaches to concepts in bilingual memory", Bilingualism: Language and Cognition, 2 (3): 209–230, doi:10.1017/S1366728999000322, S2CID 28571055
- Phillips, Webb; Boroditsky, Lera (2003), "Can quirks of grammar affect the way you think? Grammatical gender and object concepts", in R. Alterman; D. Kirsh (eds.), Proceedings of the Twenty-Fifth Annual Meeting of the Cognitive Science Society, Boston: Cognitive Science Society
- Pinker, Steven (1994), The Language Instinct: How the Mind Creates Language, Perennial
- Pula, Robert P. (1992), "The Nietzsche–Korzybski–Sapir–Whorf Hypothesis?", ETC: A Review of General Semantics, 49 (1): 50–57
- Pullum, Geoffrey (1991), The Great Eskimo Vocabulary Hoax and other Irreverent Essays on the Study of Language (PDF), Chicago University Press
- Pütz, Martin; Verspoor, Marjolyn, eds. (2000), Explorations in linguistic relativity, John Benjamins Publishing Company, ISBN 978-90-272-3706-4
- Sapir, Edward (1921), Language: An Introduction to the Study of Speech, Harcourt, Brace
- Sapir, Edward (1983), David G. Mandelbaum (ed.), Selected Writings of Edward Sapir in Language, Culture, and Personality, University of California Press
- Schultz, Emily Ann (1990), Dialogue at the Margins: Whorf, Bakhtin, and Linguistic Relativity, University of Wisconsin Press
- Seidner, Stanley S. (1982), Ethnicity, Language, and Power from a Psycholinguistic Perspective, Bruxelles: Centre de recherche sur le pluralinguismePress
- Seuren, Pieter A. M. (1998), Western linguistics: An historical introduction, Wiley-Blackwell, ISBN 978-0-631-20891-4
- Trager, George L. (1959), "The Systematization of the Whorf Hypothesis", Anthropological Linguistics, 1 (1): 31–35
- Whorf, Benjamin (1956), Carroll, John B. (ed.), Language, Thought, and Reality: Selected Writings of Benjamin Lee Whorf, MIT Press
  - Whorf, Benjamin Lee (2012), Language, thought, and reality: selected writings of Benjamin Lee Whorf, John B. Carroll, Stephen C. Levinson, Penny Lee (2nd ed.), Cambridge, Mass.: The MIT Press, ISBN 978-0-262-51775-1, OCLC 801407269
- Wolff, K. J.; Holmes (2011), "Linguistic relativity" (PDF), Wiley Interdisciplinary Reviews: Cognitive Science, pp. 253–265, archived from the original (PDF) on 18 July 2013
