= Eskimo words for snow =

Linguistic cliché

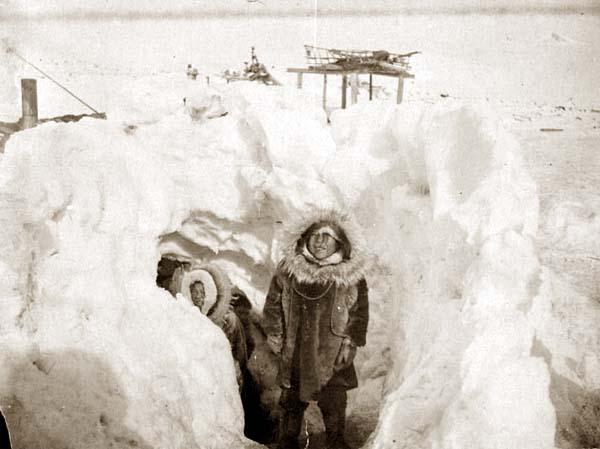
Alaskan Inuit in their winter home, half underground in the village of Stebbins, Alaska, 1900

The claim that Eskimo words for snow are unusually numerous, particularly in contrast to English, is a cliché commonly used to support the controversial linguistic relativity hypothesis. In linguistic terminology, the relevant languages are the Eskaleut languages, specifically the Yupik and Inuit varieties.

The strongest interpretation of the linguistic relativity hypothesis posits that a language's vocabulary (among other features) shapes or limits its speakers' view of the world. This interpretation is widely criticized by linguists, though a 2010 study supports the core notion that the Yupik and Inuit languages have many more root words for frozen variants of water than the English language. The original claim is loosely based in the work of anthropologist Franz Boas and was particularly promoted by his contemporary, Benjamin Lee Whorf. The idea is commonly tied to larger discussions on the connections between language and thought.

== Overview ==
Franz Boas did not make quantitative claims but rather pointed out that the Eskaleut languages have about the same number of distinct word roots referring to snow as English does, but have rich derivational morphology which can create many different words from the same root. A good deal of the ongoing debate thus depends on how one defines "word", and perhaps even "word root".

The first re-evaluation of the claim was by linguist Laura Martin in 1986, who traced the history of the claim and argued that its prevalence had diverted attention from serious research into linguistic relativity. A subsequent influential, humorous, and polemical, essay by Geoffrey K. Pullum repeated Martin's critique, calling the process by which the so-called "myth" was created the "Great Eskimo Vocabulary Hoax". Pullum argued that the fact that the number of word roots for snow is about equally large in Eskimoan languages and English indicates that there exists no difference in the size of their respective vocabularies to define snow. Other specialists in the matter of Eskimoan languages and Eskimoan knowledge of snow and especially sea ice argue against this notion and defend Boas's original fieldwork amongst the Inuit, at the time known as Eskimo, of Baffin Island.

Languages in the Inuit and Yupik language groups add suffixes to words to express the same concepts expressed in English and many other languages by means of compound words, phrases, and even entire sentences. One can create a practically unlimited number of new words in the Eskimoan languages on any topic, not just snow, and these same concepts can be expressed in other languages using combinations of words. In general and especially in this case, it is not necessarily meaningful to compare the number of words between languages that create words in different ways due to different grammatical structures.

On the other hand, some anthropologists have argued that Boas, who lived among Baffin Islanders and learned their language, did in fact take account of the polysynthetic nature of Inuit language and included "only words representing meaningful distinctions" in his account. Igor Krupnik, an anthropologist at the Smithsonian Arctic Studies Center in Washington, supports Boas's work but notes that Boas was careful to include only words representing meaningful distinctions. Krupnik and others charted the vocabulary of about 10 Inuit and Yupik dialects and concluded that they indeed have many more words for snow than English does. Central Siberian Yupik has 40 terms. In Nunavimmiutitut, the Inuktitut dialect spoken in Canada's Nunavik region has at least 53, including matsaaruti, for wet snow that can be used to ice a sleigh's runners, and pukak, for crystalline powder snow that looks like salt. Within these dialects, the vocabulary associated with sea ice is even richer. In the Iñupiaq language of Wales, Alaska, Krupnik documented 70 terms for ice including: utuqaq, ice that lasts year after year; siguliaksraq, a patchwork layer of crystals that form as the sea begins to freeze; and auniq, ice that is filled with holes. Similarly, the Sámi peoples, who live in the northern tips of Scandinavia and Russia, use at least 180 words related to snow and ice, according to Ole Henrik Magga, a linguist in Norway. Unlike Inuit dialects, Sámi languages are not polysynthetic, making it easier to distinguish words.

Studies of the Sámi languages of Norway, Sweden and Finland, conclude that the languages have anywhere from 180 snow- and ice-related words and as many as 300 different words for types of snow, tracks in snow, and conditions of the use of snow.

== Origins and significance ==
The first reference to Inuit having multiple words for snow is in the introduction to Handbook of American Indian languages (1911) by linguist and anthropologist Franz Boas. He says:

To take again the example of English, we find that the idea of WATER is expressed in a great variety of forms: one term serves to express water as a LIQUID; another one, water in the form of a large expanse (LAKE); others, water as running in a large body or in a small body (RIVER and BROOK); still other terms express water in the form of RAIN, DEW, WAVE, and FOAM. It is perfectly conceivable that this variety of ideas, each of which is expressed by a single independent term in English, might be expressed in other languages by derivations from the same term. Another example of the same kind, the words for SNOW in Eskimo, may be given. Here we find one word, aput, expressing SNOW ON THE GROUND; another one, qana, FALLING SNOW; a third one, piqsirpoq, DRIFTING SNOW; and a fourth one, qimuqsuq, A SNOWDRIFT.

The essential morphological question is why a language would say, for example, "lake", "river", and "brook" instead of something like "waterplace", "waterfast", and "waterslow". English has many snow-related words, but Boas's intent may have been to connect differences in culture with differences in language.

The hypothesis of linguistic relativity put forth by Edward Sapir and Benjamin Lee Whorf, holds that the language we speak both affects and reflects our view of the world. This idea is also reflected in the concept behind general semantics. In a popular 1940 article on the subject, Whorf referred to Eskimo languages having several words for snow:

We [English speakers] have the same word for falling snow, snow on the ground, snow hard packed like ice, slushy snow, wind-driven snow – whatever the situation may be. To an Eskimo, this all-inclusive word would be almost unthinkable....

Later writers, prominently Roger Brown in his Words and Things: An Introduction to Language and Carol Eastman in her Aspects of Language and Culture, inflated the figure in sensationalized stories: by 1978, the number quoted had reached fifty, and on February 9, 1984, an unsigned editorial in the New York Times gave the number as one hundred. However, the linguist Geoffrey K. Pullum contends that Inuit and other related dialects do not possess an extraordinarily large number of terms for snow.

== Inuit word roots ==
Three distinct word roots with the meaning snow are reconstructed for the Proto-Eskimoan language: *qaniɣ 'falling snow', *aniɣu 'fallen snow', and *apun 'snow on the ground'. These three stems are found in all Inuit languages and dialects—except for West Greenlandic, the main dialect of the Greenlandic language, which lacks *aniɣu. The Alaskan Yup'ik and Siberian Yupik people (among others) however, are not Inuit or Iñupiat, nor are their languages Inuit or Iñupiaq, but all are classifiable as Eskimos, lending further ambiguity to the "Eskimo words for snow" debate.

== See also ==
- 50 Words for Snow (album)
- Snowclone – Cliché used as a pattern for other expressions
