= A rose by any other name would smell as sweet =

Adage from Romeo and Juliet

"A rose by any other name would smell as sweet" is a popular adage from William Shakespeare's play Romeo and Juliet, in which Juliet seems to argue that it does not matter that Romeo is from her family's rival house of Montague. The reference is used to state that the names of things do not affect what they really are.

== Origin ==
In the famous speech of Act II, Scene II of the play, the line is said by Juliet in reference to Romeo's house: Montague. The line implies that his name (and thus his family's feud with Juliet's family) means nothing and they should be together.

Juliet:

O Romeo, Romeo! wherefore art thou Romeo?
Deny thy father and refuse thy name;
Or, if thou wilt not, be but sworn my love,
And I'll no longer be a Capulet.

Romeo:

[Aside] Shall I hear more, or shall I speak at this?

Juliet:

'Tis but thy name that is my enemy;
Thou art thyself, though not a Montague.
What's Montague? It is nor hand, nor foot,
Nor arm, nor face, nor any other part
Belonging to a man. O, be some other name!
What's in a name? That which we call a rose
By any other name would smell as sweet;
So Romeo would, were he not Romeo call'd,
Retain that dear perfection which he owes
Without that title. Romeo, doff thy name,
And for that name which is no part of thee
Take all myself.

Romeo:

I take thee at thy word:
Call me but love, and I'll be new baptized;
Henceforth I never will be Romeo.

== Original texts ==
Although it is one of the most famous quotes from the work of Shakespeare, no printing in Shakespeare's lifetime presents the text in the form known to modern readers: it is a skillful amalgam assembled by Edmond Malone, an editor in the eighteenth century.

Romeo and Juliet was published twice, in two very different versions. The first version of 1597, named "Q1", is believed to have been an unauthorised pirate copy or bad quarto provided to the printer by actors off the books: a memorial reconstruction. It may also, separately, represent a version of the play improved and trimmed after rehearsals for more dramatic impact.

It runs:

’Tis but thy name that is mine enemy:
What's Montague? It is not hand nor foot,
Nor arm, nor face, nor any other part.
What's in a name? That which we call a rose,
By any other name would smell as sweet.

Q2, a superior 1599 printing, is believed to be a more official version printed from Shakespeare's original manuscript although perhaps not with Shakespeare's personal input. This is because there are textual oddities such as "false starts" for speeches that were presumably not clearly crossed out enough for the printer to spot.

It uses the text:

’Tis but thy name that is my enemy:
Thou art thyself, though not a Montague,
What's Montague? It is not hand nor foot,
Nor arm nor face. O be some other name,
belonging to a man!
What's in a name? That which we call a rose,
By any other word would smell as sweet.

Malone reasoned that the awkward half-line of "belonging to a man" could be reconnected into verse through correction with Q1. Modern editors have generally concurred.

== In popular culture ==
In The Original Star-Trek series, in the 2nd season, the 22nd episode is called "By Any Other Name", named after the adage.

In McLeod's daughters episode 'Spark from Heaven' from season 7, Gabe remarks "By any other name" after learning Rose's name.

== See also ==
- Law of identity
- Linguistic relativity and linguistic determinism
- List of idioms attributed to Shakespeare
- Rectification of names
- Rhetorical device
