= Asifa Majid =

Psychologist, linguist and cognitive scientist

Asifa Majid is a British psychologist, linguist and cognitive scientist who is professor of language, communication and cultural cognition at the University of Oxford, UK. She is the 2024 recipient of the Jeffrey L. Elman Prize for Scientific Achievement and Community Building, awarded by the Cognitive Science Society. In 2015 she won the Ammodo KNAW Award for fundamental research. In 2024 she was elected a Fellow of the British Academy.

== Biography ==
Majid's academic career began at the University of Glasgow, where she took first an undergraduate degree and then a PhD in psychology; she also worked there as a lecturer in 2000-2001. From 2001 to 2012, she was based at the Max Planck Institute for Psycholinguistics in Nijmegen, initially as a Marie Curie fellow and later as a scientific staff member and senior researcher. In 2012 she took up a position as professor of language, communication and cultural cognition at the Radboud University Nijmegen, during which time she was also an affiliated principal investigator at the Donders Institute for Brain, Cognition and Behaviour. In the Fall of 2012, Majid was a Fellow at the Swedish Collegium for Advanced Study in Uppsala, Sweden. From 2012 to 2017 she held an NWO Vici research grant to study olfactory cognition and language cross culturally.

In 2018, she was one of eight academics appointed as Inspirational Research Leaders and full professors at the University of York. In 2022 she moved to become Professor of Cognitive Science in the Department of Experimental Psychology in Oxford, where she is also a fellow of St Hugh's College.

Majid has been a member of the Academia Europaea since 2013 and a fellow of the Association for Psychological Science since 2018. She has also served as a member of the Governing Board (2016-2022) and Chair (2019-2020) of the Cognitive Science Society.

== Research ==
Majid's research focuses on the psychology of language and how this relates to other areas of cognition. In particular, she has worked on olfactory language, and on the (non-)universality of word meanings across cultures. Her group has carried out research on the semantic systems of Ryukyuan languages, the Avatime language of Ghana, and languages of Europe.

In general, Majid's research findings are consistent with the weak version of the linguistic relativity hypothesis: that linguistic usage and categorization may influence other areas of cognition to a limited degree. For instance, her work with the Jahai people of Southeast Asia shows that these people are as proficient in naming odours as colours, whereas in English, which has a more restricted range of linguistic categories for odour, speakers find it easier to name colours than odours.

Majid's research has been featured on Dutch television and on the BBC as well as at the Cheltenham Literary Festival and in Time magazine.

== Selected publications ==
- Majid, Asifa, Melissa Bowerman, Sotaro Kita, Daniel B. M. Haun, and Stephen C. Levinson. 2004. "Can language restructure cognition? The case for space". Trends in Cognitive Sciences 8(3), 108–114.
- Majid, Asifa, Melissa Bowerman, Miriam Van Staden, and James S. Boster. 2007. "The semantic categories of cutting and breaking events: A crosslinguistic perspective". Cognitive Linguistics 18(2), 133–152.
- Majid, Asifa, James S. Boster, and Melissa Bowerman. 2008. "The cross-linguistic categorization of everyday events: A study of cutting and breaking". Cognition 109(2), 235–250.
- Majid, Asifa, and Stephen C. Levinson. 2011. "The senses in language and culture". The Senses and Society 6(1), 5–18.
- Dolscheid, Sarah, Shakila Shayan, Asifa Majid, and Daniel Casasanto. 2013. "The thickness of musical pitch: Psychophysical evidence for linguistic relativity". Psychological Science 24(5), 613–621.
- Majid, Asifa, and Niclas Burenhult. 2014. "Odors are expressible in language, as long as you speak the right language". Cognition 130(2), 266–270.
