= Hopi Dictionary/Hopìikwa Lavàytutuveni =

Hopi-English bilingual dictionary

Hopi Dictionary/Hopìikwa Lavàytutuveni: A Hopi–English Dictionary of the Third Mesa Dialect
- Editors: Hopi Dictionary Project
- Language: English and Hopi
- Subject: Hopi language
- Publisher: University of Arizona Press
- Publication date: 1998
- Publication place: United States
- Media type: Print
- Pages: 900
- ISBN: 0-816-51789-4
- LC Class: PM1351.Z5 H66 1998
- Text: Hopi Dictionary/Hopìikwa Lavàytutuveni: A Hopi–English Dictionary of the Third Mesa Dialect at Internet Archive

Hopi Dictionary/Hopìikwa Lavàytutuveni: A Hopi–English Dictionary of the Third Mesa Dialect (Hopi pronunciation: [hoˈpiˌikwa laˈβajˌtɯtɯˌβɛni]) is a Hopi–English bilingual dictionary compiled by the Hopi Dictionary Project, a research team based at the Bureau of Applied Research in Anthropology at the University of Arizona. It was published in 1998 by the University of Arizona Press.

Some of the Hopi community tried to prevent it from being published because they did not want non-Hopis to have access to the Hopi language, which they held to be the specific cultural heritage of their community. After a period of discussions and legal proceedings, the dictionary was published in 1998.

== Contents ==
The dictionary has an introduction with bibliography, a guide to dictionary entries, a list of abbreviations, a 797-page Hopi-English section, a 161-page English-Hopi finder list and a 30-page grammatical sketch of the Hopi language including an explanation of the orthography used. The dictionary has 29,394 entries of which 23,994 are main entries and the rest cross-references.

== Compilation ==
No comprehensive dictionary of the Hopi language had been published when the Hopi Dictionary Project was instigated at the University of Arizona in 1985, as only wordlists, texts and smaller grammar sketches had been published by linguists. Hopi was then not a literary language and speaker numbers were in decline. The dictionary was envisioned both as a scholarly reference work and as a tool to revitalizing the Hopi language. Kenneth C. Hill, a linguist specialising in Uto-Aztecan languages, was made the director of the project and was in charge of procuring funding for it and making basic preparations. The project achieved funding from 1986. Editors included the Hopi native speaker and teacher Emory Sekaquaptewa, Mary E. Black, and the native speakers and language consultants Michael and Lorena Lomatuway'ma.

The editors tried to ensure that the dictionary entries did not infringe on the Hopis' sense of religious propriety: for example, they did not give detailed translations of the meanings of the names of different Kachinas. They also carefully considered the format in which the linguistic data should be represented, in order to best facilitate its use among both native speakers and scholars. To assure community support and involvement, Sekaquaptewa set up a board of Hopi elders who volunteered to take part in the dictionary compilation process in order to help the survival of the Hopi language. While the copyright was retained for the University of Arizona, it was arranged so that all royalties from the book were to go to the Hopi Foundation, a charitable foundation devoted to improve Hopi education. A preliminary presentation of the Project in 1991 also received a favorable response from parts of the Hopi community. The compilation of the dictionary took 10 years and in May 1996 Hill sent a camera-ready copy to the University of Arizona Press.

== Publication controversies ==
In the early 1990s, the beginnings of a controversy were brewing. In Arizona, high schools students must learn a foreign language but the only languages offered at that time were Spanish and Navajo. Some Hopi parents wanted Hopi lessons to be offered to ethnic Hopi, but local legislation forbids ethnic restrictions for any classes, so Navajo- and English-speaking students would have been able to study Hopi, something that was not acceptable to some Hopi parents.

In the mid-1990s, the implementation by the Hopi tribal organization of the Native American Graves Protection and Repatriation Act caused further tension and discussion about Hopi communal ownership of their language. The Hopi tribe requested that all collections of data pertaining to Hopi cultural heritage be closed to the public, and free access to individuals be given only under written authorization of the Hopi tribal council.

In 1997, Hill received a letter from Leigh J. Kuwanwisiwma, Director of the Hopi Tribe's Cultural Preservation Office expressing concerns that the dictionary project had not sought joint copyrights with the Hopi tribe, that the linguistic consultants who had contributed to the project had not given sufficiently informed consent to the free accessibility of information provided for non-Hopis, and finally that royalties should also be given to the CPO and the Hopi Health Department. He also found the list price of $85 excessive. He requested that the printing of the dictionary be held off until the issues had been addressed. While the dictionary had already been printed it was not yet cut and bound and the press suspended production.

A meeting held between representatives of the Hopi community and the University of Arizona Press (UAP) raised the major concerns of some Hopis that the data in the dictionary would make the Hopi language accessible to non-Hopis. They felt that this constituted selling the Hopi language and thereby handing their cultural heritage out for grabs. They felt that the price was inaccessible for most Hopis, and that the copyright should be handed over to the Hopi Tribe so that they would be able to restrict access to the data.

Stephen F. Cox, director of UAP, replied to Kuwanwisiwma explaining that copyright legislation pertains to distinct written expressions, and does not exist to protect languages. He stated that there was no way in which access to the book could be restricted to Hopis, but that, other than Hopi Tribe members, only linguistic scholars would be expected to buy the dictionary. He committed to giving 23 copies of the book to the Hopi Tribe and to sell any further copies to the Hopi tribe at a 40% discount. He also agreed to divide royalties between the Hopi Foundation and the Hopi tribal government itself.

The CPO responded by sending out a public memorandum on October 16, 1997, stating that the CPO cultural advisory team opposed the dictionary's publication. On February 23, 1998, Tribe Chairman Wayne Taylor, Jr. proposed to Cox that copyrights be transferred to the Hopi Tribe and that the Hopi Tribe buy all the copies of the dictionary. After deliberation the University Press agreed to turn over copyrights and all remaining, unsold copies of the dictionary on January 1, 2008. The tribe would receive 500 copies at half price (although this would cause a loss of nearly $10,000 to the press). This proposal was accepted by the Hopi tribal government.

The book was published on May 14, 1998. Within a few days of publication, several Hopi individuals, including a bookseller, bought copies of the book. On August 3, 1999, the Hopi Cultural Preservation Office announced a procedure by which any enrolled member of the Hopi Tribe could purchase a single copy of the Dictionary at a price of $50; resale of these discounted copies was prohibited.

== Aftermath and influence ==
After publication, the conflict between the CPO and the dictionary project was laid aside and Hill reports that the Dictionary seems to have become valued by the Hopi community. It was granted high praise by those anthropologists and linguists who reviewed it. Linguist William Bright wrote that the dictionary "takes its place as one of the most sophisticated and comprehensive dictionaries ever prepared for an American Indian language; indeed, it is among the best dictionaries available for any language of the world, and a model for future lexicographers of 'neglected' languages." Karin Dakin of the National Autonomous University of Mexico gave similar praise, describing its 30,000 detailed entries as "an immense accomplishment … an incentive for all indigenous lexicographers." Anthropologist Peter Whiteley praised the "detailed lexical items, grammatical structures, sentence examples, and semantic variations of the Hopi Dictionary [as] one of the most profound and far-reaching achievements in the history of the study of American Indian Languages."

== Bibliography ==
- Bright, William (1999). "Note". Language in Society. 28. Pittsburgh: Department of English Carnegie Mellon University: 481–483. doi:10.1017/S0047404599213073. ISSN 0047-4045. S2CID 145721682.
- Dakin, Karen (2000). "Book Review: Hopi Dictionary/Hopìikwa Lavàytutuveni: A Hopi Dictionary of the Third Mesa Dialect with an English-Hopi Finder List and a Sketch of Hopi Grammar Hopi Dictionary Project, Bureau of Applied Anthropology, University of Arizona". International Journal of American Linguistics. 66 (3). Chicago: University of Chicago Press: 398. doi:10.1086/466431. OCLC 1753556.
- Hill, Kenneth C. (2002). "On Publishing the Hopi Dictionary". In William Frawley; Pamela Munro; Kenneth C. Hill (eds.). Making dictionaries: Preserving Indigenous Languages of the Americas. Berkeley, CA: University of California Press. pp. 195–218. ISBN 0-520-22995-9. OCLC 47863283.
- Hopi Dictionary Project (University of Arizona Bureau of Applied Research in Anthropology) (1998). Kennth C. Hill; Emory Sekaquaptewa; Mary E. Black; Ekkehart Malotki; Michael Lomatuway'ma (eds.). Hopi Dictionary : Hopìikwa Lavàytutuveni: A Hopi–English Dictionary of the Third Mesa Dialect With an English-Hopi Finder List and a Sketch of Hopi Grammar. Tucson, Arizona: University of Arizona Press. ISBN 0-8165-1789-4.
- McLaughlin, John E. (1999). "Hopi Dictionary/Hopìikwa Lavàytutuveni: A Hopi-English Dictionary of the Third Mesa Dialect with an English-Hopi Finder List and Sketch of Hopi Grammar". Anthropological Linguistics. 41 (2): 252–253.
- Whiteley, Peter M. (1999). "Hopi Dictionary/Hopìikwa Lavàytutuveni: A Hopi–English Dictionary of the Third Mesa Dialect: Review". American Anthropologist. 101 (3): 659–660. doi:10.1525/aa.1999.101.3.659. OCLC 51205515.
