= John A. Lucy =

American linguist and psychologist

John A. Lucy is an American linguist and psychologist. His work primarily concerns the relations between language and cognition, especially the hypothesis of linguistic relativity. He is the William Benton Professor in the Department of Comparative Human Development and the Department of Psychology at the University of Chicago. Lucy has worked extensively with the Yucatec Maya language, specializing in the system of noun classification.

== Research ==
John Lucy is a modern proponent of the linguistic relativity hypothesis. He has argued for a weak version of this hypothesis as a result of his comparative studies between the grammars of English and Mayan Yucatec. One of the experiments that he has carried out goes as follows: He showed a series of objects to native speakers of each language, showing them a single object in first place and two different objects afterwards. Participants then had to choose which of the latter two they found was the most similar to the first one. Lucy noticed that native speakers of English would usually choose an object according to its shape, whereas Yucatec speakers would take into account what matter the object was made of. Thus, if for example, they were shown a cardboard box, English speakers would usually choose a box-like object as the most similar one, whereas Yucatec speakers would prefer to choose any object made of cardboard, regardless of its shape. Lucy attributed these results to the presence of nominal classifiers in Mayan Yucatec: every time the noun is preceded by a numeral, these nominal classifiers are placed between the numeral and the noun, and their function is to specify what the shape of the noun is like. Therefore, the noun, when not accompanied by a classifier, is seen by Yucatec speakers as a shapeless entity, as opposed to English speakers, who understand the object as something already shaped. Thus, different languages would entail different ways to conceptualize reality, therefore determining a different ontology.

== Books ==
- 1992. Language Diversity and Thought (Cambridge)
- 1992. Grammatical Categories and Cognition (Cambridge)
- 1993. Reflexive Language: Reported Speech and Metapragmatics (Cambridge)

== Major articles ==
- 1979. Whorf and his critics: Linguistic and nonlinguistic influences on color memory. (With Richard Shweder.) American Anthropologist 81(3): 581–615. Reprinted in R. W. Casson (ed.), Language, Culture, and Cognition, New York: Macmillan Publishing Co., 1981, pp. 133–63
- 1988. The effects of incidental conversation on memory for focal colors. (With Richard Shweder.) American Anthropologist 90(4): 923–31.
- 1994. The role of semantic value in lexical comparison: Motion and position roots in Yucatec Maya. Linguistics 32(4/5): 623–656. (Special issue "Space in Mayan Languages" edited by J. Haviland and S. Levinson.)
- 1996. The scope of linguistic relativity: An analysis and review of empirical research. J.J. Gumperz and S.C. Levinson (eds.), Rethinking Linguistic Relativity. Cambridge: Cambridge University Press, pp. 37–69.
- 1997. Linguistic relativity. Annual Review of Anthropology 26: 291–312.
- 1992, Language Diversity and Thought: A Reformulation of the Linguistic Relativity Hypothesis. Cambridge: Cambridge University Press.
- 1992, Grammatical Categories and Cognition: A Case Study of the Linguistic Relativity Hypothesis. Cambridge: Cambridge University Press.
- 1993, Reflexive Language: Reported Speech and Metapragmatics. Cambridge: Cambridge University Press. Editor.)
- 2001, Grammatical categories and the development of classification preferences: A comparative approach. (With Suzanne Gaskins.) In S. Levinson and M. Bowerman (eds.), Language Acquisition and Conceptual Development. Cambridge University Press, pp. 257–283.
- 2003, Interaction of language type and referent type in the development of nonverbal classification preferences. (With Suzanne Gaskins.) In D. Gentner and S. Goldin-Meadow (eds.), Language in Mind: Advances in the Study of Language and Thought. Cambridge, MA: MIT Press, pp. 465–492.
- 2004, Language, culture, and mind in comparative perspective. In M. Achard and S. Kemmer (ed.), Language, Culture, and Mind. Stanford, CA: Center for the Study of Language and Information Publications [distributed by the University of Chicago Press], pp. 1–21.
