= Eric Lenneberg =

American linguist and neurologist (1921–1975)

Eric Heinz Lenneberg (19 September 1921 – 31 May 1975) was a linguist and neurologist who pioneered ideas on language acquisition and cognitive psychology, particularly in terms of the concept of innateness.

== Life and career ==
He was born in Düsseldorf, Germany. Ethnically Jewish, he left Nazi Germany because of rising Nazi persecution. He initially fled to Brazil with his family and then to the United States where he attended the University of Chicago and Harvard University. A professor of psychology and neurobiology, he taught at the Harvard Medical School, the University of Michigan in Ann Arbor and Cornell University and Medical School.

Lenneberg's 1964 paper "The Capacity of Language Acquisition," originally published in 1960, sets forth seminal arguments about the human-specific biological capacity for language, which were then being developed in his research and discussions with George A. Miller, Noam Chomsky, and others at Harvard and MIT, and popularized by Steven Pinker in his book, The Language Instinct. He presents four arguments for the biological innateness of psychological capacities, parallel to arguments in biology for the innateness of physical traits:

- Universal appearance of a trait at a single time across a species. "Species typical" traits.
- Universal appearance across time for a group. Not just an artifact of cultural history. Again, "species typical" diagnostic feature.
- No learning of the trait is possible.
- Individual development of a trait rigidly follows a given schedule regardless of the particular experience of the organism.

In his publication Biological Foundations of Language he advanced the hypothesis of a critical period for language development; a topic which remains controversial and the subject of debate. Lenneberg's biological approach to language was related to developments such as the motor theory of speech perception developed by Alvin Liberman and colleagues at Haskins Laboratories, which also provided historical antecedents to issues now emerging in embodied philosophy and embodied cognition.

Lenneberg reargued extensively against the psychological implications of the work of Edward Sapir and Benjamin Lee Whorf, specifically in regard to the idea that language influences thought. Lenneberg's argument against this notion was that 'linguistic and non-linguistic events must be separately observed and described before they can be correlated.'

== Affiliations ==
Lenneberg was quite involved in the scientific community, as he was a member of Phi Beta Kappa, Sigma Xi, the Linguistic Society of America, the American Psychological Association, the Society for Research in Child Development, and the American Association for the Advancement of Science.

== Education ==
He attended primary school in Düsseldorf, Germany until 1933, when he moved to Brazil. In 1949, he received a B.A. from the University of Chicago. Lenneberg then went on to earn a Ph.D. in Psychology and Linguistics from Harvard in 1956.

== Bibliography ==
- Biological Foundations of Language. New York: John Wiley & Sons, 1967. ISBN 0-471-52626-6
- 'The Capacity of Language Acquisition' in Fodor, Jerry and Jerrold Katz, eds., The Structure of Language. Englewood Cliffs, NJ: Prentice Hall 1964. (A collection of papers around early Chomskyan linguistics, phonology, grammar, semantics.)
