= Ekkehart Malotki =

German-American linguist (born 1938)

Ekkehart Malotki (born 1938) is a German-American linguist, known for his extensive work on the documentation of the Hopi language and culture, specifically for his refutation of the myth that the Hopi have no concept of time. He is professor emeritus at Northern Arizona University. He studied with philosopher and linguist Helmut Gipper at the Westfälische Wilhelms-Universität at Münster and his early work was a continuation of his mentor's. Malotki conducted four years of research on the Third Mesa, studying Hopi spatial and temporal reference. He published two large volumes, one in German, Hopi-Raum (Hopi Space) and one in English, Hopi Time. Subsequently, he published a large number of texts and myths in the Hopi language. His work has been described as beginning a new phase of ethnographic study in which Hopi discourse was made available in their own language. He was also a principal data constructer and co-editor of the Hopi Dictionary: Hopìikwa Lavàytutuveni, and he supplied the Hopi subtitles for the Qatsi trilogy.
