= Linguistic determinism =

Idea of language as the principal framework in dictating human thought

Linguistic determinism is a hypothesis that language and its structures limit and determine human knowledge or thought, as well as thought processes such as categorization, memory, and perception. The term implies that people's native languages will affect their cognition or thought process and therefore people will have different thought processes based on their mother tongues.

Linguistic determinism is the strong form of linguistic relativism (popularly known as the Sapir–Whorf hypothesis), which argues that individuals experience the world based on the structure of the language they habitually use. Since the 20th century, linguistic determinism has largely been discredited by studies and abandoned within linguistics, cognitive science, and related fields.

== Overview ==
The Sapir-Whorf hypothesis branches out into two theories: linguistic determinism and linguistic relativity. Linguistic determinism is viewed as the stronger form – because language is viewed as a complete barrier, a person is stuck with the perspective that the language enforces – while linguistic relativity is perceived as a weaker form of the theory because language is discussed as a lens through which life can be focused, but the lens can be changed, and perspectives can be changed along with it.

The term "Sapir–Whorf hypothesis" is considered a misnomer by linguists and academics, because Edward Sapir and Benjamin Lee Whorf never co-authored any works (however, Whorf had studied under Sapir at Yale University), and never stated their ideas in terms of a hypothesis. The distinction between a weak and a strong version of this hypothesis is also a later invention; Sapir and Whorf never set up such a dichotomy, although often in their writings their views are expressed in stronger or weaker terms. The two linguists were nevertheless among the first to formulate the principle of linguistic relativity.

While Sapir exercised the idea that language is essential to understanding one's worldview and that difference in language implies a difference in social reality, he never directly explored how language affects thought, although significant traces of the linguistic relativity principle underlie his perception of language.

Whorf explored Sapir's concept further and reformulated Sapir's thought in his essay "Science and Linguistics". In Whorf's more radical view, the relationship between language and culture played a crucial role in the perception of reality. The formulation of thoughts, according to Whorf, is not a conscious, independent process, rather, thoughts are determined by the specific grammar and vocabulary of the language in which ideas are expressed. The world, as each individual views it, is, therefore, organized and rationalized through language; because language is the way thoughts are expressed, the language can also shape thoughts.

Linguistic determinism and linguistic relativity are heavily debated and researched topics among academics, like linguists Guy Deutscher and Eric Lenneburg, psychologists such as Peter Gordon and Steven Pinker, and even philosophers like Friedrich Nietzsche. There are critiques and support for both theories as outlined in research among Guugu-Yimidhirr, Hopi, and Pirahã speakers.

== Evidence and criticisms ==
=== Hopi ===
Whorf's conclusion was largely based upon a close examination and extensive study of the Native American Hopi language spoken among natives of southwestern North America. During earlier years, Whorf published a number of essays in which he analyzed various linguistic aspects of Hopi. For example, a work called "An American Indian model of the universe" (1936) explores the implications of the Hopi verb system concerning the conception of space and time.

In the course of his research, Whorf noticed that Hopi and some other languages (Hebrew, Aztec, and Maya) were built upon a different structure than that of English and many other languages which he called SAE (Standard Average European) languages. He discovered several significant features distinguishing Hopi from SAE languages which he used to continue formulating his concept of linguistic determinism.

For example, Hopi is a "timeless" language, whose verbal system lacks tenses. The assessment of time is different from the SAE linear temporal view of past, present, and future because it indicates the event's time duration. Whorf observed that sense of time varies with each observer:

The timeless Hopi verb does not distinguish between the present, past and future of the event itself but must always indicate what type of validity the speaker intends the statement to have.

Hopi time is non-dimensional and cannot be counted or measured in typical SAE language measurement, i.e. the Hopi will not say "I stayed six days," but "I left on the sixth day." In the Hopi perception of time, it is crucial to determine whether an event can be warranted to have occurred, to be occurring, or to be expected to occur. Hopi grammatical categories signify a view of the world as an ongoing process, where time is not divided into fixed segments so that certain things recur, e.g. minutes, evenings, or days. The linguistic structure of SAE languages, on the other hand, gives its speakers a more fixed, objectified and measurable understanding of time and space, where they distinguish between countable and uncountable objects and view time as a linear sequence of past, present, and future.

The Hopi language also contains a verb system which, unlike SAE languages, can make a single-action verb into a repeated/prolonged action verb with an extension of the word. For example, "tíri" translates to "he gives a start" but "tirírita" becomes "he is trembling".

Whorf argues that since thought is expressed and transmitted through language, it follows that a differently structured language must shape thought along its lines, thus influencing perception. Consequently, a Hopi speaker who perceives the world through the medium of his language must see reality through the patterns laid down by its linguistic structure.

An outspoken critic of linguistic determinism, cognitive psychologist Steven Pinker, known for his alignment with Chomsky's universalist ideas, disagrees strongly with Whorf's analysis. Pinker argued that Whorf relied too heavily on linguistic data alone to draw conclusions regarding the relationship between language and thought. In his book, The Language Instinct, Pinker dismisses linguistic determinism as a "conventional absurdity," instead proposing a universal language of thought – termed Mentalese.

He asserts that Whorf was completely mistaken in his characterization of the Hopi as having no concept of time and that the Hopi do in fact have tense, units of time, temporal metaphors, and a complex system of time-keeping.

=== Guugu Yimithirr ===
Linguist Guy Deutscher, a supporter of linguistic relativity – the weaker counterpart of linguistic determinism – used research among the Guugu Yimithirr to challenge the validity of linguistic determinism. While linguistic relativists believe that language influences thought, they do not support the concept that language is a permanent lens through which all thoughts must be filtered. In Deutscher's book Through the Language Glass, the chapter "Where the Sun Doesn't Rise in the East" discusses the language Guugu Yimithirr spoken by aboriginal Australians and how it reinforces linguistic relativity.

Deutscher introduces the Guugu Yimithirr language, where they describe everything geocentrically based on its cardinal direction (the chair is to the East) rather than egocentrically (the chair is to your right). It is clear how this system of expressing position and location influenced the Guugu Ymithirr's conceptualization of space. Their description of objects' locations, within photos or on television, would change based on the rotation of the media because they described things using cardinal directions. For example, if there was a photograph with a tree on the left side of the photo and a girl on the right side, the speakers of Guugu Yimithirr would describe the tree as West of the girl. If the photo was then rotated 90 degrees clockwise the tree would now be described as North of the girl.

The implications, as Deutscher describes, were that the speakers of Guugu Yimithirr have a "perfect pitch" for direction and that their sense of direction is completely non-egocentric. In one experiment, speakers were asked to recall a very recent event and describe it. The people recalled their placement, as well as the placement of important people and objects around them perfectly, even accounting for their position in the retelling. Many years later, the same people were asked to recall that same event, and it was shown that over time, they were still able to accurately recall the directionality of objects and people. Deutscher argues that this example illustrates that geocentric direction is encoded into the memories of Guugu Ymithirr because their language requires it. More broadly, they see the world differently due to their unique conceptualization of space, but this does not mean that they are trapped within the constraints of their language.

In an interview about his work, Deutscher condemned Whorf's strong concept of linguistic relativism because there is no evidence that language can truly restrict the ability to reason or to gain knowledge. Even if languages do not provide "ready made labels" for certain concepts or objects, most people are still able to understand and discuss these ideas.

=== Pirahã ===
Similar to the claims that Hopi prevents its speakers from thinking about time, some linguists allege that the Pirahã language spoken by natives in South American Amazonia prevents its speakers from thinking about quantity and numbers.

Peter Gordon, a psychologist from Columbia University, studied the speakers of the Pirahã language. He has conducted many experiments on a small representative number of these speakers. Gordon highlights eight experiments involving seven Pirahã speakers. Six of the experiments were all related in that the speakers were instructed to match groups of items to the correct number displayed elsewhere. The other two experiments had them recall how many items had been placed into a container, and lastly differentiate between various containers by the number of symbols that were pictured on the outside. Gordon found that the speakers of Pirahã could distinguish between the numbers one, two, and three relatively accurately, but any quantity larger than that was essentially indistinguishable to them. He also observed that the more the amount represented by the number increased, the poorer the subjects performed. Gordon concluded, in direct contrast to Deutscher, that speakers of Pirahã are restricted to thinking about numbers through symbols or other representations. These speakers think of items as small, larger, or many. The speakers did not demonstrate an ability to learn numbers; after being taught in the Portuguese language for eight months, not one individual could count to ten.

Daniel Everett, a linguist who also studied the Pirahã, claimed that the Pirahã language also lacks recursion or nesting – the term which describes the ability of a finite set of grammatical rules to create an infinite combination of expressions and was previously thought to be a feature of all languages. This argument includes the possibility that the thoughts of the speakers are influenced by their language in various ways as well. Whether or not Pirahã lacks recursion remains a topic of intense debate and linguistic determinism has been widely criticized for its absolutism and refuted by linguists.

One such argument comes from Michael Frank et al. who continued Daniel Everett's research and ran further experiments on the Pirahã published in "Numbers as a cognitive technology," and found that Everett was wrong, the Pirahã did not have words for "one," or "two," but instead had words for "small," "somewhat larger," and "many."

For example, one may perceive different colors even while missing a particular word for each shade, like New Guinea aborigines can distinguish between the colors green and blue even though they have only one lexical entry to describe both colors. In communities where language does not exist to describe color, it does not mean the concept is void – rather the community may have a description or phrase to determine the concept. Everett describes his research into the Pirahã tribe who use language to describe color concepts in a different way to English speakers: "[...] each word for color in Pirahã was actually a phrase. For example, biísai did not mean simply 'red'. It was a phrase that meant 'it is like blood'."

Thus, in its strong version 'Whorfian hypothesis' of linguistic determination of cognition has been widely refuted. In its weaker form, however, the proposal that language influences thinking has frequently been discussed and studied.

=== Additional examples ===
Linguistic determinism can also be evident in situations where the means of drawing attention to a certain aspect of an experience is language. For example, in French, Spanish or Russian there are two ways to address a person because those languages have two second-person pronouns – singular and plural. The choice of pronoun depends on the relationship between the two people (formal or informal) and the degree of familiarity between them. In this respect, the speaker of any of those languages is always thinking about the relationship when addressing another person and therefore unable to separate those two processes.

Other studies supporting the principle of linguistic determinism have shown that people find it easier to recognize and remember shades of colors for which they have a specific name.

Pinker criticizes this argument for linguistic determinism as well. He points out that although a plethora of languages label colors differently, this variation in language cannot change the human biological process of color perception; he also notes that there are universal tendencies in the color labels that languages possess (i.e. if a language has two terms, they will be for white and black; with three terms, add red; with four, add either yellow or green).

Pinker thinks everybody thinks in the same language known as Mentalese and knowledge of a particular language constitutes the ability to translate this Mentalese into a string of words for the sake of communication.

=== General semantics ===
General semantics was a therapy program created by Polish-American scholar Alfred Korzybski in the 1920s for the purpose of altering behavior. It has been regarded as a reliable method and produced effective results concerning altering behavior.

Language acts as the basis for behavioral therapy; the methods used are based on the idea that language influences human thoughts, feelings, and behaviors. Korzybski's program assumes that people misappropriate language, creating damaging effects. By clarifying language, participants create a more accurate mental representation, which in turn creates an emotional response.

As such, the general idea behind general semantics is to alter your language to change the feelings created within the mind-space, so as to elicit the desired response. According to Korzybski, the mind consists of different silent and verbal levels. On the nonverbal level, there exist feelings, thought, and nervous system responses, and on the verbal level there are language systems. He instructs people to understand any given word as just a lexical representation and nothing more and to react accordingly. This is to avoid misappropriation of thoughts and feelings attached to any one thing. Because this program has been shown to produce effective results, this has large implications that language determines thought, supporting linguistic determinism.

=== Eric Lenneberg and Roger Brown (1954) ===
Psycholinguists Eric Lenneberg and Roger Brown were among the first to refute Whorf's ideas of linguistic determinism. They identify Whorf's major ideas as (a) the world is experienced differently by speakers of different languages and (b) language is causally linked to these cognitive differences. They explore the two types of evidence Whorf uses to argue for the existence of cognitive differences between linguistic communities: lexical differences and structural differences.

==== Lexical differences ====
Lenneberg and Brown analyze the example of Inuit snow terms. They claim that their three distinct terms for what English speakers would simply call "snow" do not indicate that English speakers cannot perceive these differences, but rather that they just do not label them. They go on to point out that, on occasion, speakers of English do classify different types of snow (i.e. "good-packing snow" and "bad-packing snow") but do so with phrases instead of a single lexical item. They conclude that English speakers' and Inuit speakers' worldviews cannot differ in this way, given that both groups are able to discriminate between different types of snow.

==== Structural differences ====
To refute Whorf's notion that structural categories correspond to symbolic categories, Lenneberg and Brown point out that structural categories rarely have consistent meanings. When they do, these meanings are not necessarily evident to speakers, as the case of grammatical gender in French illustrates. All French words with feminine gender do not reflect “feminine” qualities, nor do they share any common attributes. Lenneberg and Brown conclude that the existence of structural classes alone cannot be interpreted as reflective of differences in cognition.

==== Conclusions ====
Lenneberg and Brown ultimately conclude that the causal relationship between linguistic differences and cognitive differences cannot be concluded based on the evidence Whorf provides, which is solely linguistic in nature. They do, however, appear to find the proposition worthy of study, and pursue the study of color terms in order to supplement linguistic evidence with psychological data.

== In literature and media ==
=== George Orwell's 1984: Newspeak ===
In Orwell's famous dystopian novel, 1984, the fictional language of Newspeak provides a strong example of linguistic determinism. The restricted vocabulary and grammar make it impossible to speak or even think of rebelling against the totalitarian government, instead aligning its speakers with the ideology of Ingsoc. Newspeak highlights the deterministic proposition that if a language does not have the means to express certain ideas, its speakers cannot conceptualize them. Orwell devotes the Appendix to a description of Newspeak and its grammar:

The purpose of Newspeak was not only to provide a medium of expression for the world-view and mental habits proper to the devotees of Ingsoc, but to make all other modes of thought impossible. It was intended that when Newspeak had been adopted once and for all and Oldspeak forgotten, a heretical thought – that is, a thought diverging from the principles of Ingsoc – should be literally unthinkable, at least so far as thought is dependent on words. Its vocabulary was so constructed as to give exact and often very subtle expression to every meaning that a Party member could properly wish to express, while excluding all other meanings and also the possibility of arriving at them by indirect methods.

It is worth noting that the main character Winston Smith, and others, were able to both conceive and speak of rebellion, despite the influences of Newspeak. 1984 does, however, take place before the full imposition of Newspeak; characters spoke both a combination of Newspeak and Oldspeak (standard English), which may have allowed for heretical thought and action.

=== In philosophy ===
Friedrich Nietzsche lived before the Sapir-Whorf hypothesis was formulated, however, many of his views line up with the assumptions of linguistic determinism. He is credited with the term "Language as a prison". Alfred Korzybski also supports the hypothesis inadvertently through general semantics. German philosopher Nietzsche famously wrote, "We cease to think if we do not want to do it under linguistic constraints," which was originally translated incorrectly as "We have to cease to think if we refuse to do so in the prison-house of language." The phrase "prison-house of language" came to represent the extreme position regarding linguistic determinism. Although Nietzsche's position was not quite as drastic as the prison-house view, he did believe that language acts as the building blocks of thought, fundamentally shaping and influencing it. This was his explanation as to why cultural differences exist: because the language is different, the thought process is therefore different.

Nietzsche also wrote that there is the "will to power and nothing besides," and this is another way Nietzsche expresses that language is a fixed structure that is responsible for the desires, thoughts, and actions of humans. This represents linguistic determinism, making language the "prison" that minds are therefore trapped in. According to Nietzsche things like table, or rain are incomprehensible without the words being present in language.

=== Arrival (2016) ===
Based on the short story "Story of Your Life" by Ted Chiang, the science-fiction film Arrival rests on the notion of linguistic determinism. It follows linguist Louise Banks as she is recruited to decipher the messages of extraterrestrial visitors to Earth. As she learns their language of complex circular symbols, she begins to see flashes of her daughter's life and death. It later becomes evident that these flash back-like visions are glimpses into her future. By acquiring the alien language and its nonlinear notion of time, Banks is able to see both past and future. The award-winning movie illustrates an example of the strong version of the Sapir-Whorf Hypothesis since it presupposes that language determines thought. Learning an extraterrestrial language affected Banks's worldview so drastically that it completely transformed her perception of time.

=== Experimental languages in science fiction ===
The possibility of linguistic determinism has been explored by a variety of authors, mostly in science fiction. There exist some languages, like Loglan, Ithkuil and Toki Pona for instance, which have been constructed for the purpose of testing the assumption.

== Role in literary theory ==
Linguistic determinism is a partial assumption behind developments in rhetoric and literary theory. For example, French philosopher Jacques Derrida dissected the terms of "paradigmatic" hierarchies (in language structures, some words exist only with antonyms, such as light/dark, and others exist only with relation to other terms, such as father/son and mother/daughter; Derrida targeted the latter). He believed that if one breaks apart the hidden hierarchies in language terms, one can open up a "lacuna" in understanding, an "aporia," and free the mind of the reader/critic. Similarly, Michel Foucault's New Historicism theory posits that there is a quasi-linguistic structure present in any age, a metaphor around which all things that can be understood are organized. This "episteme" determines the questions that people can ask and the answers they can receive. The episteme changes historically: as material conditions change, so the mental tropes change, and vice versa. When ages move into new epistemes, the science, religion, and art of the past age look absurd. Some Neo-Marxist historians have similarly looked at culture as permanently encoded in a language that changes with the material conditions. As the environment changes, so too do the language constructs.

== See also ==
- Determinism – Belief that events are determined by prior ones
- Embodied bilingual language – Linguistics concept
- Giambattista Vico – Italian philosopher (1668–1744)
- Linguistic relativity – Hypothesis of language influencing thought
- Male as norm – Feminist principle
