= Semantic domain =

Term in linguistics

In linguistics, the term semantic domain refers to an abstract space containing all the 'meanings' of every term in a language. Since multiple words can have the same meaning, the semantic domain can also be thought of as grouping the terms based on meaning. Harriet Ottenheimer (2006), a writer in Linguistic Anthropology, defines a semantic domain as a “specific area of cultural emphasis”.

In lexicography a semantic domain or semantic field is defined as "an area of meaning and the words used to talk about it ... For instance English has a domain ‘Rain’, which includes words such as rain, drizzle, downpour, raindrop, puddle.". Semantic domains are the foundational concept for initial stages of vernacular dictionary building projects. These techniques rely on extensive lists of semantic domains that are relevant to vernacular languages.

In the social sciences, the concept of semantic domains stemmed from the ideas of cognitive anthropology. The quest was originally to see how the words that groups of humans use to describe certain things are relative to the underlying perceptions and meanings that those groups share (Ottenheimer, 2006, p. 18). Ethnosemantics became the field that concentrated around the study of these semantic domains, and more specifically the study of how categorization and context of words and groups of words reflected the ways that different cultures categorize words into speech and assign meaning to their language.

== Examples ==
Many sports have specific semantic domains that entail terminology that is specific to that particular sport. In order to understand the meanings of these terms one would need to understand the context and domain of that sport. For instance, in basketball there are many words that are specific to the sport. Free throw, court, half court, three pointer, and point guard are all terms that are specific to the sport of basketball. These words make very little sense when used outside of the semantic domain of basketball.

Another example of a semantic domain would be a coffee shop. The words latte, cappuccino, or Starbucks probably would not be understood unless one could associate this language with the semantic domain of a coffee shop.
