= Language and thought =

Study of how language influences thought

The study of how language influences thought and vice versa has a long history in a variety of fields. There are two bodies of thought forming around the debate. One body of thought stems from linguistics and is known as the Sapir–Whorf hypothesis. There is a strong and a weak version of the hypothesis that argue for more or less influence of language on thought. The strong version, linguistic determinism, argues that without language, there is and can be no thought (a largely-discredited idea), and the weak version, linguistic relativity, supports the idea that there are some influences from language on thought. On the opposing side, there are 'language of thought theories', which believe that public language is not essential to private thought though the possibility remains that private thought when infused with inessential language diverges in predilection, emphasis, tone, or subsequent recollection. Those theories address the debate of whether thought is possible without language, which is related to the question of whether language evolved for thought. These ideas are difficult to study because it proves challenging to parse the effects of culture versus thought and of language in all academic fields.

The main use of language is to convey information. It can be used to transfer thoughts from one mind, to another mind, and to modify and explore thoughts within a mind. The bits of linguistic information that enter one person's mind from another cause people to entertain a new thought with profound effects on their world knowledge, inferencing, and subsequent behavior. In the act of speaking, thought comes first, and spoken or written language is an expression that follows. Language has certain limitations, and humans cannot express all that they think. Writing was a powerful new invention because it enabled revision of language and allowed an initial thought to be conveyed, reviewed, and revised before it is expressed.

Language can also be used for thought by framing and modifying thinking with a precision that was not possible without language.

== Language of thought ==
Language of thought theories rely on the belief that mental representation has linguistic structure. Thoughts are "sentences in the head" and so take place within a mental language. Two theories work in support of the language of thought theory. Causal syntactic theory of mental practices hypothesizes that mental processes are causal processes defined over the syntax of mental representations. Representational theory of mind hypothesizes that propositional attitudes are relations between subjects and mental representations. In tandem, these theories explain how the brain can produce rational thought and behavior. All three of those theories were inspired by the development of modern logical inference. They were also inspired by Alan Turing's work on causal processes that require formal procedures within physical machines.

The language of thought hypothesis hinges on the belief that the mind works like a computer, always in computational processes. The theory believes that mental representation has both a combinatorial syntax and compositional semantics. The claim is that mental representations possess combinatorial syntax and compositional semantic—that is, mental representations are sentences in a mental language. Turing's work on physical machines implementation of causal processes that require formal procedures was modeled after these beliefs.

Another prominent linguist, Steven Pinker, developed the idea of a mental language in his book The Language Instinct (1994). Pinker refers to the mental language as "mentalese". In the glossary of his book, Pinker defines mentalese as a hypothetical language that is used specifically for thought. The hypothetical language houses mental representations of concepts such as the meaning of words and sentences.

== Scientific hypotheses ==
- The Sapir–Whorf hypothesis in linguistics states that the grammatical structure of a mother language influences the way that the world is perceived. The hypothesis has been largely abandoned by linguists, who have found very limited experimental support for it, at least in its strong form, linguistic determinism. For instance, a study showing that speakers of languages lacking a subjunctive mood such as Chinese experience difficulty with hypothetical problems has been discredited. Another study showed that subjects in memory tests are more likely to remember a given color if their mother language includes a word for that color; however, those findings do not necessarily support the hypothesis specifically. Other studies concerning the Sapir-Whorf hypothesis can be found in the "studies" section below.
- Chomsky's independent theory, founded by Noam Chomsky, considers language as one aspect of cognition. Chomsky's theory states that a number of cognitive systems exist, which seem to possess distinct specific properties. The cognitive systems lay the groundwork for cognitive capacities like language faculty.
- Piaget's cognitive determinism exhibits the belief that infants integrate experience into progressively higher-level representations. Jean Piaget called the belief "constructivism", which supports that infants progress from simple to sophisticated models of the world through a change mechanism that allows an infant to build on their lower-level representations to create higher-level ones. That view opposes nativist theories about cognition being composed of innate knowledge and abilities.
- Vygotsky's theory on cognitive development, known as Vygotsky's theory of interchanging roles, supports the idea that social and individual development stems from the processes of dialectical interaction and function unification. Lev Vygotsky believed that before two years of age, both speech and thought develop in differing ways along with differing functions. The idea that relationship between thought and speech is ever-changing supports Vygotsky's claims. His theory claims that thought and speech have different roots. At the age of two, a child's thought and speech collide, and the relationship between thought and speech shifts since thought then becomes verbal, and speech then becomes rational.
- According to the theory behind cognitive therapy, founded by Aaron T. Beck, emotions and behavior are caused by the internal dialogue. People can change themselves by learning to challenge and refute their own thoughts, especially a number of specific mistaken thought patterns called "cognitive distortions". Cognitive therapy has been found to be effective by empirical studies.
- In behavioral economics, according to experiments that are said to support the theoretical availability heuristic, people believe events that are more vividly described are more probable than those that are not. Simple experiments that asked people to imagine something led them to believe it to be more likely. The mere exposure effect may also be relevant to propagandistic repetition like the Big Lie. According to prospect theory, people make different economic choices based on how the matter is framed.

== Studies concerning the Sapir–Whorf hypothesis ==
=== Counting ===
Different cultures use numbers in different ways. The Munduruku language, for example, has number words only up to five. In addition, it refers to the number 5 as "a hand" and the number 10 as "two hands". Numbers above 10 are usually referred to as "many".

Perhaps the counting system that is the most different from that of modern Western civilisation is the "one-two-many" system used in the Pirahã language in which quantities larger than two are referred to simply as "many". In larger quantities, "one" can also mean a small amount and "many" a larger amount. Research was conducted with the Pirahã by using various matching tasks. The non-linguistic tasks were analyzed to see if their counting system or, more importantly, their language affected their cognitive abilities. The results showed that they perform quite differently from, for example, an English-speaking person who has a language with words for numbers more than two. For example, they represented numbers 1 and 2 accurately using their fingers, but as the quantities grew larger (up to 10), their accuracy diminished. This phenomenon is also called the "analog estimation", as numbers get bigger the estimation grows. Their declined performance is an example of how a language can affect thought and great evidence to support the Sapir–Whorf hypothesis.

=== Orientation ===
Language also seems to shape how people from different cultures orient themselves in space. For instance, many Australian Aboriginal cultures, such as the Kuuk Thaayorre, use exclusively cardinal directions ("north", "south", "east" and "west") and never define space with relative directions from the observer. Instead of using terms like "left", "right", "back" and "forward", speakers from such cultures would say, "There is a spider on your northeast leg" or "Pass the ball to the south-southwest". In fact, instead of "hello", the greeting in such cultures is, "Where are you going?" and sometimes even "Where are you coming from?" Such a greeting would be followed by a directional answer: "To the northeast in the middle distance". Using such language has the consequence that speakers need to be constantly oriented in space, or they cannot express themselves properly or even get past a greeting. Speakers of languages that rely on absolute reference frames have a greater navigational ability and spatial knowledge compared to speakers of languages that use relative reference frames. In comparison with English-speakers, speakers of languages such as Kuuk Thaayorre are also much better at staying oriented even in unfamiliar spaces, and there is strong evidence that their language is what enables them to do so.

=== Color ===
Language may influence color processing. Having more names for different colors or different shades of colors makes it easier for both children and adults to recognize them. Research has found that all languages have names for black and white and that the colors defined by each language follow a certain pattern (i.e. a language with three colors also defines red; one with four defines green or yellow; and one with six defines blue, brown, and then other colors).

== Other schools of thought ==
- General semantics is a school of thought founded by engineer Alfred Korzybski in the 1930s, later popularized by S.I. Hayakawa and others, and attempts to make language more precise and objective. It makes many basic observations of English, particularly pointing out problems of abstraction and definition. General semantics is presented as both a theoretical and a practical system whose adoption can reliably alter human behavior in the direction of greater sanity. It is considered to be a branch of natural science and includes methods for the stimulation of the activities of the human cerebral cortex, which is generally judged by experimentation. In this theory, semantics refers to the total response to events and actions, not just the words. The neurological, emotional, cognitive, semantic, and behavioral reactions to events determines the semantic response of a situation. This reaction can be referred to as semantic response, evaluative response, or total response.
- E-prime is a constructed language identical to the English language but lacking all forms of "to be". Its proponents claim that dogmatic thinking seems to rely on "to be" language constructs, and so by removing it we may discourage dogmatism.
- Neuro-linguistic programming, founded by Richard Bandler and John Grinder, claims that language "patterns" and other things can affect thought and behavior. It takes ideas from general semantics and hypnosis, especially that of the famous therapist Milton Erickson. Many do not consider it a credible study, and it has no empirical scientific support.
- Advocates of non-sexist language including some feminists say that English perpetuates biases against women, such as by using male-gendered terms such as "he" and "man" as generic. Many authors, including those who write textbooks, now conspicuously avoid that practice and in the case of the previous examples use words like "he or she" or "they" and "human race".
- Various other schools of persuasion directly suggest using language in certain ways to change the minds of others, including oratory, advertising, debate, sales, and rhetoric. The ancient sophists discussed and listed many figures of speech such as enthymeme and euphemism. The modern public relations term for adding persuasive elements to the interpretation of and commentary on news is called spin.
- Studies in psychology have found that bilingual people respond differently when they complete tasks in different languages. For example, one study randomly assigned bilingual people in India to complete a work task in Hindi or English. Social norms were more effective at motivating people to work longer in Hindi, whereas payment was more effective in English, which is similar to results when people work in their native languages in the United States and India. Another study randomly assigned bilingual managers in Hong Kong to rate the importance of different values in English or Chinese. When surveyed English, managers in Hong Kong rated conformity and tradition as less important and rated achievement and hedonism as more important.

== Popular culture ==
The Sapir–Whorf hypothesis is the premise of the 2016 science fiction film Arrival. The protagonist explains that "the Sapir–Whorf hypothesis is the theory that the language you speak determines how you think".

== See also ==
- Embodied cognition
- Image schema
- Inner voice
- Kant and the Platypus: Essays on Language and Cognition by Umberto Eco
- Lev Vygotsky
- Origin of language
- Philosophy of language
