= Standard Average European =

Linguistic category tracking areal features of European languages

Simplified linguistic map of Europe

Standard Average European (SAE) is a concept originally introduced in 1936 by American linguist Benjamin Whorf to group the modern Indo-European languages of Europe with shared common features. Whorf argued that the SAE languages were characterized by a number of similarities, including syntax and grammar, vocabulary and its use, as well as the relationship between contrasting words and their origins, idioms, and word order, which all made them stand out from many other language groups around the world which do not share these similarities, in essence creating a continental sprachbund. His intention was to argue that the disproportionate amount of SAE-specific knowledge in linguistics created a substantial SAE-centric bias, leading to generalization errors, such as mistaking linguistic features idiosyncratic to the SAE language group for universal tendencies.

Whorf contrasted what he called the SAE tense system (which contrasts past, present and future tenses) with that of the Hopi language of North America, which Whorf analyzed as being based on a distinction not of tense, but on things that have in fact occurred (a realis mood encompassing SAE past and present) compared to things that have as yet not occurred, but which may or may not occur in the future (irrealis mood). The accuracy of Whorf's analysis of Hopi tense later became a point of controversy in linguistics.

== Overview ==
Whorf likely considered Romance and West Germanic to form the core of the SAE, i.e. the literary languages of Europe which have seen substantial cultural influence from Latin during the medieval period. The North Germanic and Balto-Slavic languages tend to be more peripheral members.

Alexander Gode, who was instrumental in the development of Interlingua, characterized it as "Standard Average European". The Romance, Germanic, and Slavic control languages of Interlingua are reflective of the language groups most often included in the SAE Sprachbund.

== As a Sprachbund ==
According to Haspelmath (2001), the SAE languages form a Sprachbund characterized by the following features, sometimes called "euroversals" by analogy with linguistic universals:

- definite and indefinite articles (e.g. English the vs. a/an)
- postnominal relative clauses with inflected relative pronouns that signal the role of the head in the clause (e.g. English who vs. whose)
- a periphrastic perfect formed with 'have' plus a passive participle (e.g. English I have said);
- a preponderance of generalizing predicates to encode experiencers, i.e. experiencers appear as surface subjects in nominative case (e.g. English I like music instead of Music pleases me, though compare Italian Mi piace la musica and German Musik gefällt mir, which are of the form "Music pleases me")
- a passive construction formed with a passive participle plus an intransitive copula-like verb (e.g. English I am known);
- a prominence of anticausative verbs in inchoative-causative pairs (e.g., expansion of Latin reflexive se in its Spanish reflex to cover anticausative constructions such as ubicarse, "to [physically] be [in some specific location]," derived from ubicar, "to locate"; cf. Russian inchoative anticausative izmenit’-sja, "to change (intransitive)," derived from causative izmenit’, "to change [something], make [something] change")
- dative external possessors (e.g. German Die Mutter wusch dem Kind die Haare "The mother washed the child's hair" (lit. "The mother washed the hair to the child")), Portuguese Ela lavou-lhe o cabelo "She washed his hair" (lit. "She washed him the hair")
- negative indefinite pronouns without verbal negation (e.g. German Niemand kommt "nobody comes" vs. Modern Greek κανένας δεν έρχεται "nobody (lit. not) comes")
- particle comparatives in comparisons of inequality (e.g. English bigger than an elephant)
- equative constructions (i.e. constructions for comparison of equality) based on adverbial relative-clause structures, e.g. Occitan tan grand coma un elefant, Russian tak že X kak Y, where coma/kak (historically coming from the adverbial interrogative pronoun "how") are "adverbial relative pronouns" according to Haspelmath
- subject person affixes as strict agreement markers, i.e. the verb is inflected for person and number of the subject, but subject pronouns may not be dropped even when this would be unambiguous (only in some languages, such as German and French)
- differentiation between intensifiers and reflexive pronouns (e.g. German intensifier selbst vs. reflexive sich)

Besides these features, which are uncommon outside Europe and thus useful for defining the SAE area, Haspelmath (2001) lists further features characteristic of European languages (but also found elsewhere):

- verb-initial order in yes/no questions;
- comparative inflection of adjectives (e.g. English bigger);
- For conjunctions of noun phrases, SAE languages prefer "A and-B" instead of "A-and B", "A-and B-and", "A B-and", or the comitative "with";
- syncretism of instrumental and comitative cases (e.g. English I cut my food with a knife when eating with my friends);
- suppletivism in second vs. two;
- lack of distinction between alienable (e.g. legal property) and inalienable (e.g. body part) possession;
- lack of distinction between inclusive and exclusive first-person plural pronouns ("we and you" vs. "we and not you");
- lack of productive usage of reduplication;
- topic and focus expressed by intonation and word order;
- word order subject–verb–object;
- only one converb (e.g. English -ing form, Romance gerunds), preference for finite rather than non-finite subordinate clauses;
- specific construction for negative coordination (e.g. English neither...nor...);
- phasal adverbs (e.g. English already, still, not yet);
- tendency towards replacement of past tense by the perfect.

The Sprachbund defined this way consists of the following languages:

- Germanic languages;
- Romance languages;
- Baltic languages;
- Slavic languages;
- Albanian;
- Greek;
- the "westernmost" Finno-Ugric languages.

The Balkan sprachbund is thus included as a subset of the larger SAE, while Baltic Eastern Europe is a coordinate member.

Not all the languages listed above show all the listed features, so membership in SAE can be described as gradient. Based on nine of the above-mentioned common features, Haspelmath regards French and German as forming the nucleus of the Sprachbund, surrounded by a core formed by English, the other Romance languages, the Nordic languages, and the Western and Southern Slavic languages. Hungarian, the Baltic languages, the Eastern Slavic languages, and the Finnic languages form more peripheral groups. All languages identified by Haspelmath as core SAE are Indo-European languages, except Hungarian and the Finnic languages. However, not all Indo-European languages are SAE languages: the Celtic, Armenian, and Indo-Iranian languages remain outside the SAE Sprachbund.

The Standard Average European Sprachbund is most likely the result of ongoing language contact beginning in the time of the Migration Period. Inheritance of the SAE features from Proto-Indo-European can be ruled out because Proto-Indo-European, as currently reconstructed, lacked most of the SAE features. Furthermore, in some cases younger forms of a language do have an SAE feature which attested older forms lack; for example, Latin does not have a periphrastic perfect, but modern Romance languages such as Spanish and French do. Much of the area of SAE was at various times part of the Roman Empire or the vague concept of a political entity called Christendom and thus affected by the religious, political and ideological discourse of these entities and their respective sphere of influence. This discourse and long distance communication among elites generally took place in one of the linguas francas of the era – Koine Greek and Classical Latin in Late Antiquity, Medieval Latin in the Middle Ages and finally in the modern era Modern Latin gradually being replaced by vernaculars such as modern French, German and – in the 20th and 21st century – increasingly English. These languages have left learned borrowings (also known as inkhorn terms) in the prestige variants of almost all European languages and continue to provide loanwords, calques and idioms.

== See also ==
- Eurolinguistics
- Languages of Europe

== Bibliography ==
- Grzega, Joachim (ed.). 2025. The Routledge Handbook of Eurolinguistics. Routledge.
- Haspelmath, Martin (2001). "The European linguistic area: Standard Average European". In Haspelmath, Martin; König, Ekkehard; Oesterreicher, Wulf; Raible, Wolfgang (eds.). Language Typology and Language Universals. Vol. 2. Berlin: De Gruyter. pp. 1492–1510. doi:10.1515/9783110194265-044. ISBN 9783110171549. Archived from the original on 4 March 2019.
- Heine, Bernd and Kuteva, Tania. 2006. The Changing Languages of Europe. Oxford University Press.
- Van der Auwera, Johan. 2011. Standard Average European. In: Kortmann, B. & van der Auwera, J. (eds.) The Languages and Linguistics of Europe: A Comprehensive Guide. (pp. 291–306) Berlin: de Gruyter Mouton.
