= Whorf (surname) =

Whorf is a surname. Notable people with the surname include:

- Benjamin Lee Whorf (1897–1941), American linguist
- Richard Whorf (1906–1966), American film director, actor and producer, brother of Benjamin Whorf
- John Whorf (1903–1959), American realist artist who is best known for his watercolors
- Mike Whorf (1932–2020), American radio personality, son of John Whorf

== See also ==
- Worf, a fictional Star Trek character
- Worf (disambiguation)
- Wharf (disambiguation)
