= Wharf (disambiguation) =

A wharf is a fixed platform where ships are loaded and unloaded.

Wharf or Wharfe may also refer to:

== Places ==
- The Wharf (Washington, D.C.), multi-use development in Washington, D.C.
- Wharfe, North Yorkshire, a village in England
- River Wharfe, in Yorkshire, England

== Other ==
- Alex Wharf (born 1975), English cricketer
- The Wharf (Holdings), Hong Kong company
- The Wharf (newspaper), produced at Canary Wharf, London

== See also ==
- Wharf Theatre (disambiguation)
- Warf (disambiguation)
- Warth (disambiguation)
- Worf (disambiguation)
- Benjamin Lee Whorf, American linguist
