= Worf (disambiguation) =

Worf is a fictional character from the Star Trek franchise.

Worf or WORF may also refer to:

- Glenn Worf (born 1954), American musician
- Window Observational Research Facility, on the International Space Station
- Write Once Read Forever, a data storage method

== See also ==
- Warf (disambiguation)
- Wharf (disambiguation)
- Whorf, a surname
- WRF (disambiguation)
