= Paul W. Smith =

American talk radio host and columnist (born 1953)

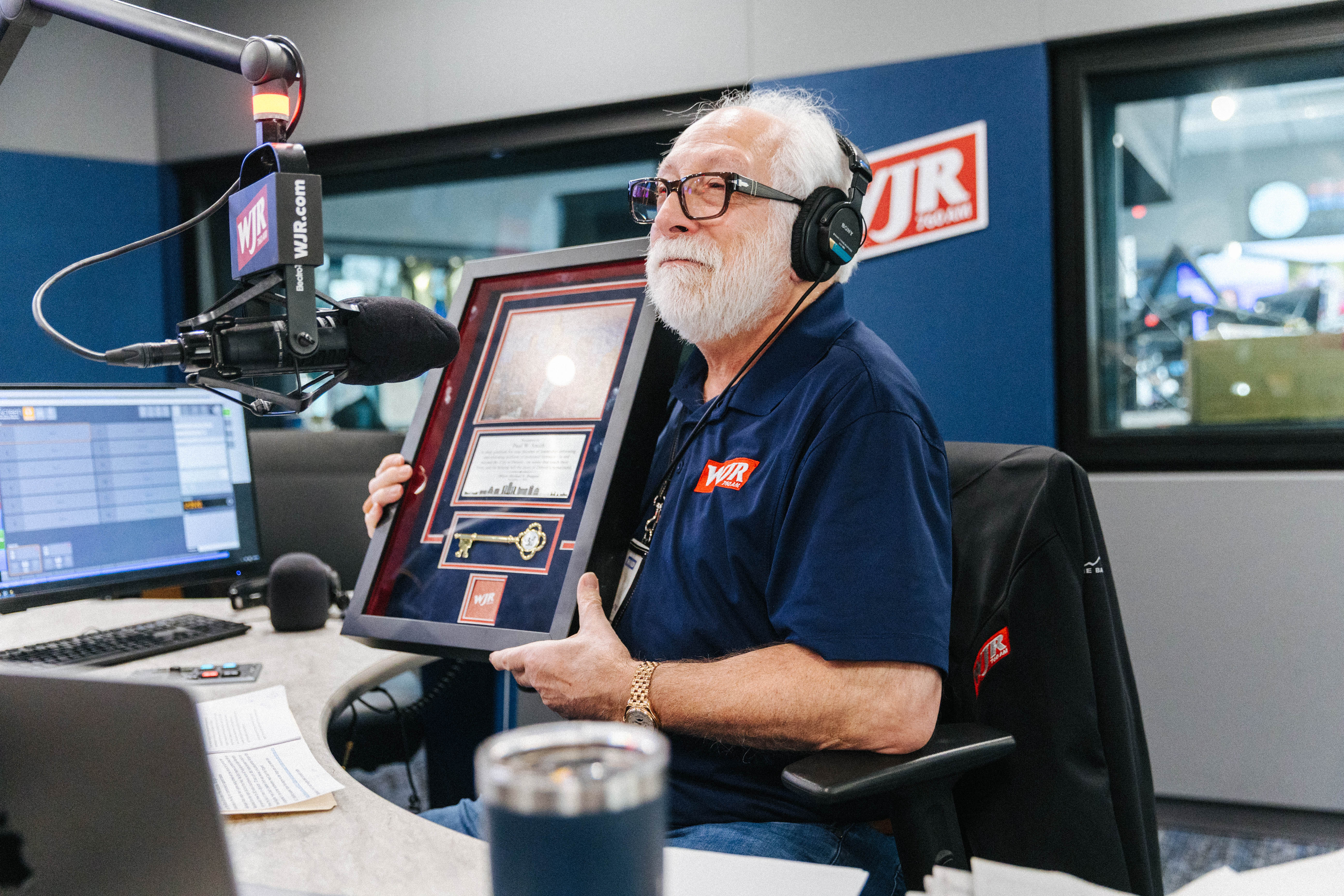
- Smith in 2026, receiving the Key to the City of Detroit
- Born: Paul William Smith; 1953 (age 72–73); Monroe, Michigan
- Education: University of Michigan
- Spouse: Kim Smith
- Presenting career
- Show: The Paul W. Smith Show
- Station: WJR
- Time slot: Weekday afternoons (noon to 2 p.m.)
- Website: www.wjr.com/paulwsmith/

Paul William Smith (born 1953) is an American talk radio host and columnist. He currently hosts the morning show on WJR radio in Detroit, Michigan and co-hosts the weekly show Opportunity Detroit. Smith's shows typically feature in-depth interviews with a number of notable people, including politicians, authors, and business leaders within the automotive industry.

== Early life ==
Smith's maternal grandparents, Sadie Hatem and Fred Betrus, immigrated to the U.S. from Lebanon, and Smith's father William D. Smith is of Dutch, English, and Irish descent. While on a boat ride to the U.S. from Lebanon, Smith's grandmother, Sadie Hatem was pregnant with Smith's mother, Helen Marie Betrus. William D. Smith, who died in 2007 at age 80, worked as an insurance agent and community theatre director.

Smith was born and raised in Monroe, Michigan as one of three children and graduated from St. Mary Catholic Central High School in Monroe and the University of Michigan.

== Radio career ==
In Toledo, Ohio, Smith began his career hosting both radio and TV shows, and he has hosted programs on the New York City stations WABC and WMCA. In 1990, Smith became the morning show host at WWDB-FM in Philadelphia. Smith has hosted the current program on WJR since 1996, taking over following the death of the legendary J.P. McCarthy. His morning show has been consistently rated as the number-one radio program in metro Detroit.

Smith was an occasional guest host for The Rush Limbaugh Show, a nationally syndicated show carried by WJR until the death of Rush Limbaugh. On WJR, Smith co-hosted the weekly program Destination 313, which explored landmarks and profiles community affairs in the city of Detroit.

In June 2023, Smith accepted an offer to move out of his longtime morning drive time slot into Limbaugh's former time slot (filled since Limbaugh's death by Cumulus syndicated host Dan Bongino), stating that he had grown exhausted with the early morning drive time slot. The move also allowed Cumulus to make WJR's lineup fully local during the daytime hours.

Smith is the Detroit area chair of the Police Athletic League and is a member of its national board. His annual "Pals for PAL" golf fundraiser finances the bulk for the local PAL programs.

Beginning March 13, 2006, Smith began authoring a Monday column for the Detroit News which borrows heavily from former Detroit Free Press columnist Bob Talbert.
