= Warf =

Warf or WARF may refer to:

- WARF, a radio station (1350 AM) licensed to Akron, Ohio, United States
- Wisconsin Alumni Research Foundation, technology transfer office of the University of Wisconsin–Madison, United States
- Benjamin Warf, American pediatric neurosurgeon and professor
- Warf or Terp, an artificial dwelling mound
- Warf Hall, a coed residence hall of Tennessee Technological University
- Warrenton Aquatic and Recreation Facility, recreation center and park in Warrenton, Virginia

== See also ==
- Wharf (disambiguation)
- Worf (disambiguation)
