= De La Salle Collegiate High School =

Location
- 14600 Common Road; Warren, Macomb County, Michigan 48088; United States; 42.515172°N 82.974699°W

Information
- Type: Private Catholic All-boys Secondary education institution
- Motto: Builders of Boys. Makers of Men.
- Religious affiliations: Roman Catholic (Christian Brothers)
- Established: 1926; 100 years ago
- Founder: Institute of the Brothers of the Christian Schools
- Principal: Christopher Dean, '89
- Teaching staff: 61.6 (on an FTE basis) (2021–22)
- Grades: 9–12
- Gender: Boys
- Enrollment: 559 (2024–25)
- Student to teacher ratio: 9.1 (2021–22)
- Colors: Purple and Gold
- Mascot: Captain Spirit
- Nickname: Pilots
- Accreditation: North Central Association of Colleges and Schools
- Publication: "The Collegiate" Alumni Magazine
- Newspaper: The Co-Pilot
- Yearbook: The Pilot
- Website: www.delasallehs.com

De La Salle Collegiate High School is an all-boys Catholic high school run by the De La Salle Christian Brothers. Founded in 1926, the school was located on the east side of Detroit before moving to its current location in Warren, Michigan, in 1982.

== History ==
=== Origins in Detroit ===
The Christian Brothers arrived in Detroit in 1851 and taught in several parish schools, including St. Anne's and St. Mary's. In 1877 they opened St. Joseph's Commercial College.

In April 1923, alumni of the St. Joseph's school began a fundraising drive for a new school run by the Brothers and independent of any parish. The school was built on the east side of Detroit at Conner and Glenfield. Ground was broken on November 15, 1925, and Bishop Michael Gallagher laid the cornerstone on January 17, 1926. De La Salle Collegiate was dedicated on September 12, 1926, and opened two days later with 85 students.

=== Growth ===
Early on, the school was accredited by the University of Detroit and the University of Michigan. A new gymnasium opened in 1936, a permanent residence for the Brothers was built on Conner Avenue in 1947, and an annex opened in 1957.

=== Move to Warren ===
On October 8, 1981, the board's properties committee concluded that the school needed to leave its aging Detroit building. In early 1982 the school agreed to buy the former Holly Junior High School in Warren, Michigan, with the purchase offer signed on March 15. The school moved that summer, and Archbishop Edmund Szoka dedicated the Warren campus on September 26, 1982.

=== Expansion ===
A $1.2 million expansion begun in 1992 added biology and computer labs, storage space and a faculty conference center, and improved the gymnasium. At its dedication on September 12, 1993, presided over by Archbishop Adam Maida, the school marked its recognition as a National Blue Ribbon School.

In the early 2000s the school began a capital campaign called "Preserving the Legacy." Its first phase broke ground on April 2, 2004, and added an academic wing with science labs and classrooms, along with a new music room, chapel, library and east entrance, into which the cornerstone from the Detroit campus was built. Bishop John Quinn dedicated the work on December 12, 2004. The project enlarged the school by more than 20 percent.

=== Centennial ===
In October 2025 the school opened the Steve and Kathy McShane STEM Innovation Center in its former library. De La Salle marked its 100th anniversary with a Mass on September 12, 2026, after which a new finance and business lab, the Bloomberg Center & Finance Lab, was blessed.

== Athletics ==
De La Salle competes in the Michigan High School Athletic Association (MHSAA). Its teams have won MHSAA state championships in football, basketball, hockey, baseball and soccer.

MHSAA state championships

- Football: 2014, 2017, 2018, 2021, 2022
- Basketball: 2022
- Hockey: 2017
- Baseball: 1993, 2000, 2009, 2016
- Soccer: 1990, 1992, 1993, 2000, 2005, 2024, 2025

Other state championships

- Lacrosse: 1994
- Bowling: 1991, 2006

== Notable alumni ==
- Alex Avila, Major League Baseball catcher for the Arizona Diamondbacks (attended but did not graduate)
- Michael Danna '15, Defensive End for the Kansas City Chiefs Super Bowl LVII victory, as well as in Super Bowl LV
- Josh DeBerry '19, college football cornerback for the Texas A&M Aggies
- Danny DeKeyser '08, formerly a National Hockey League defenseman for the Detroit Red Wings.
- Chris Godfrey '76, former National Football League player for the New York Jets, New York Giants, and Seattle Seahawks who was a starting Offensive Lineman for the Super Bowl XXI winning Giants
- Keith Karpinski '84, former National Football League player for the Detroit Lions; member of the 1986 National Champion Penn State University football team.
- Joseph LoDuca '70, Emmy Award-winning movie and television score composer.
- Michael D. MacDonald '98, former member of the Michigan Senate from the 10th district
- Brian Maisonneuve '91, former Hermann Trophy winner and former professional soccer player with the Columbus Crew
- Jerry McCabe '83, former National Football League player for the New England Patriots and Kansas City Chiefs
- J.P. McCarthy '50, former Detroit radio personality, WJR Radio
- Mike Peplowski '88, former Michigan State and professional (NBA) basketball player
- Steve Phillips '81, former New York Mets General Manager; former ESPN Baseball Tonight analyst
- Robert L. Poxon, awarded the Medal of Honor for his actions in Vietnam
- William J. Pulte '50, Chairman, Pulte Homes; Ranked #754 on Forbes Magazine list of World's Billionaires.
- Jake Sabol, baseball coach
- Bill Sheridan '77, Miami Dolphins' Inside Linebacker Coach, was part of the New York Giants' Super Bowl XLII Champion team as a Linebackers coach. He later served as the Detroit Lions linebackers' coach.
- Sam Viviano '71, Art Director, Mad Magazine
- Craig Wolanin '85, former National Hockey League player, won the Stanley Cup with the Colorado Avalanche in 1996.
