= Cryptotype =

Linguistics concept

Cryptotype or covert categories of a language is a concept coined by Benjamin Lee Whorf which describes semantic or syntactic features that do not have a morphological implementation, but which are crucial for the construction and understanding of a phrase. The cryptotype is understood in opposition to the phenotype or overt category, namely a category that is overtly marked as such. Covert categories affect words' combinative power.

British linguist Michael Halliday argued that Whorf's notion of the "cryptotype" and his conception of "how grammar models reality" will "eventually turn out to be among the major contributions of twentieth century linguistics". Halliday described the concept in the following way: "Whorf (1956) distinguished between overt and covert categories and pointed out that covert categories were often also “cryptotypes” — categories whose meanings were complex and difficult to access. Many aspects of clause grammar, and of the grammar of clause complexes, are essentially cryptotypic." Through the use of Halliday, the term has become important in Systemic functional linguistics.

Whorf introduced the concept in his 1937 paper "Grammatical categories" and based it on his belief that all grammatical categories must be in some way marked in language to be able to contribute to meaning. But Whorf noted that not all categories were marked overtly, and some were only marked overtly in exceptional cases, whereas in most or all cases their marking is covert. As an example he gave the English system of gender, where the gender of nouns only appears when the sentence employs a singular pronoun and has to choose between "he", "she" or "it". As long as no pronouns appear, the gender of the nouns is marked only covertly. The fact that a speaker has to know for each word whether the correct pronoun is "he", "she" or "it" shows that the nouns are in fact "marked" for gender — just not overtly so.

Another example of a covert category given by Whorf was the Navajo language's system of noun classification by which all nouns were marked for a combination of animacy and shape. Whorf himself used the term "cryptotype" as separate from "covert category" to refer to "a special, highly concealed subdivision of covertness, amounting sometimes to a second degree of covertness". Whorf's point in distinguishing between phenotypes and cryptotypes was to show that it is easier for a speaker of a language to be consciously aware of their usage of some categories, whereas other categories are so deeply ingrained in consciousness that they are difficult, but not impossible, to become aware of.

== Bibliography ==
- Halliday, M.A.K. (1985). "Systemic Background.". Systemic Perspectives on Discourse. Vol. 3 The Collected Works of M.A.K. Halliday. London: Continuum.
- Lee, Penny (1996). The Whorf Theory Complex — A Critical Reconstruction. John Benjamins.
- Whorf, Benjamin Lee (1945). "Grammatical Categories". Language. 21 (1): 1–11. doi:10.2307/410199. hdl:21.11116/0000-0001-907E-F. JSTOR 410199.
- Whorf, Benjamin Lee (1938). "Some Verbal Categories of Hopi". Language. 14 (4): 275–286. doi:10.2307/409181. JSTOR 409181.
