= Mike Whorf =

American radio personality (1932–2020)

- Born: Michael Whorf; April 21, 1932; Brookline, Massachusetts, US
- Died: November 10, 2020 (aged 88); St. Clair Shores, Michigan, US
- Occupations: Radio Announcer, Radio Producer
- Known for: "Kaleidoscope"
- Spouse: Barbara Ann Brown
- Children: 4
- Relatives: Benjamin Lee Whorf, uncle

Michael Whorf (April 21, 1932 – November 10, 2020) was an American radio personality based in Detroit, Michigan. He was an announcer and program host on WJR from 1964 to 2003. Whorf was producer and host of the George Foster Peabody Award-winning documentary/narrative program Kaleidoscope, a combination of storytelling, interview, historic recordings and music on a particular topic.

== Early years and family history ==
Whorf was born in Brookline, Massachusetts and spent his childhood and teen years in Provincetown, Massachusetts. His father was internationally renowned watercolorist John Whorf. Whorf's sisters Carol Whorf Westcott and Nancy Whorf Kelly were also Provincetown artists, and his brother John was an established applied artist in Hingham. Whorf is the nephew of linguist Benjamin Lee Whorf and nephew of actor and television director Richard Whorf.

Whorf graduated from Provincetown High School in 1950. Upon graduation, Whorf enlisted in the United States Air Force where he served as a radio announcer and entertainer on the Armed Forces Network. His tour of duty included assignments at air bases in California, Texas and Morocco.

== Professional history ==
After his honorable discharge from the Air Force, Whorf worked as an announcer at WOCB in West Yarmouth, Massachusetts and at WCOJ in Coatesville, Pennsylvania, where he met and married his wife Barbara Ann Brown. He later developed the Kaleidoscope predecessor "Tempo" while on the air at WTAG in Worcester, Massachusetts. Whorf also worked briefly at WWL in New Orleans, Louisiana before returning to WTAG. Shortly after, he went on to WJR.

Throughout the late 1960s and 1970s, Whorf was part of a line-up of radio personalities known throughout the region including J. P. McCarthy, Karl Haas, Jimmy Launce and MLB Hall of Fame broadcaster Ernie Harwell. Whorf's Kaleidoscope topics ranged from religion to politics, from the arts to sports. Some of Whorf's extended series included oral histories of Native American tribes and a collection of personal interviews with popular American song composers of the 1920s and 1930s entitled "The Bards of Tinpan Alley".

Whorf was a published composer. His 1979 Christmas song "The Man with a Hundred Names" muses on the many names by which Santa Claus is known worldwide.

In 1970, Whorf formed the company Mike Whorf Inc. which sold to schools, libraries and individuals cassette tape copies of Kaleidoscope. In the late 1970s and 1980s, he partnered with nephew, author and retired United States Marine Corps Captain Charles "Charlie" T. Westcott III on radio dramas and comedies that were featured during the Kaleidoscope hour, including the old-time radio parodies "Big Jim Small" and "Another Man’s Family".

Whorf briefly parted from WJR from 1983 to 1984 to serve as program director of classical station WQRS-FM in Detroit. While with WQRS, Whorf created the program "Quest for Excellence," a juried music competition show for young talents broadcast live before a studio audience. Whorf later brought that program to CKLW in Windsor, Ontario and took it with him upon his return to WJR.

Whorf's programs were also broadcast by WVXU-FM, the National Public Radio affiliate station of Xavier University in Cincinnati, Ohio.

In addition to his Peabody-winning work on topics including the life and times of Martin Luther King Jr., Whorf also received multiple broadcasting awards from the Freedoms Foundation at Valley Forge.

In 2008, he was inducted into the Michigan Broadcasting Hall of Fame by the Michigan Association of Broadcasters.
