= Robert Leslie Poxon =

United States Army Medal of Honor recipient

- Army Medal of Honor
- Born: January 3, 1947; Detroit, Michigan, US
- Died: June 2, 1969 (aged 22); Tay Ninh Province, Republic of Vietnam
- Burial place: Forest Lawn Cemetery Detroit, Michigan
- Military career
- Allegiance: United States of America
- Branch: United States Army
- Service years: 1967–1969
- Rank: First Lieutenant
- Units: 9th Cavalry Regiment, 1st Cavalry Division
- Conflicts: Vietnam War †
- Awards: Medal of Honor; Bronze Star; Achievement Medal; Purple Heart

Robert Leslie Poxon (January 3, 1947 – June 2, 1969) was a United States Army officer and a recipient of the U.S. military's highest decoration—the Medal of Honor—for his actions in the Vietnam War.

== Biography ==
Poxon joined the Army from his birth city of Detroit, Michigan in 1967, and by June 2, 1969 was serving as a first lieutenant in Troop B, 1st Squadron, 9th Cavalry Regiment, 1st Cavalry Division. During a firefight on that day, in Tay Ninh Province, South Vietnam, during Operation Toan Thang III, Poxon attempted to aid a wounded soldier and was himself wounded in the process. Despite his injuries, he continued to lead his platoon and succeeded in destroying an enemy bunker before being killed. For his actions during the battle, Poxon was posthumously awarded the Medal of Honor.

Poxon, aged 22 at his death, and a graduate of De La Salle Collegiate High School, was buried in Forest Lawn Cemetery in his hometown of Detroit, Michigan.

== Medal of Honor citation ==
First Lieutenant Poxon's official Medal of Honor citation reads:

For conspicuous gallantry and intrepidity in action at the risk of his life above and beyond the call of duty. 1st Lt. Poxon, Armor, Troop B, distinguished himself while serving as a platoon leader on a reconnaissance mission. Landing by helicopter in an area suspected of being occupied by the enemy, the platoon came under intense fire from enemy soldiers in concealed positions and fortifications around the landing zone. A soldier fell, hit by the first burst of fire. 1st Lt. Poxon dashed to his aid, drawing the majority of the enemy fire as he crossed 20 meters of open ground. The fallen soldier was beyond help and 1st Lt. Poxon was seriously and painfully wounded. 1st Lt. Poxon, with indomitable courage, refused medical aid and evacuation and turned his attention to seizing the initiative from the enemy. With sure instinct he marked a central enemy bunker as the key to success. Quickly instructing his men to concentrate their fire on the bunker, and in spite of his wound, 1st Lt. Poxon crawled toward the bunker, readied a hand grenade and charged. He was hit again but continued his assault. After succeeding in silencing the enemy guns in the bunker he was struck once again by enemy fire and fell, mortally wounded. 1st Lt. Poxon's comrades followed their leader, pressed the attack and drove the enemy from their positions. 1st Lt. Poxon's gallantry, indomitable will, and courage are in keeping with the highest traditions of the military service and reflect great credit upon himself, his unit, and the U.S. Army.

== See also ==
- List of Medal of Honor recipients
- List of Medal of Honor recipients for the Vietnam War
