= Whorf's law =

Sound law in Uto-Aztecan linguistics

Whorf's law is a sound law in Uto-Aztecan linguistics proposed by the linguist Benjamin Lee Whorf. It explains the origin in the Nahuan languages of the phoneme /tɬ/, which is not found in any of the other languages of the Uto-Aztecan family. The existence of /tɬ/ in Nahuatl had puzzled previous linguists, and caused Edward Sapir to reconstruct a /tɬ/ phoneme for Proto-Uto-Aztecan – based only on evidence from Aztecan. In a 1937 paper published in the journal American Anthropologist, Whorf argued that the phoneme was a result of some of the Nahuan or Aztecan languages having undergone a sound change changing the original */t/ to [tɬ] in the position before */a/. The sound law was labeled "Whorf's law" by Manaster Ramer and is still widely – though not universally – considered valid, although a more detailed understanding of the precise conditions under which it took place has been developed.

The situation had been obscured by the fact that often the */a/ had then subsequently been lost or changed to another vowel, making it difficult to realize what had conditioned the change. Because some Nahuan languages have /t/ and others have /tɬ/, Whorf thought that the law had been limited to certain dialects and that the dialects that had /t/ were more conservative. In 1978, Lyle Campbell and Ronald Langacker showed that, in fact, Whorf's law had affected all of the Nahuan languages and that some dialects had subsequently changed /tɬ/ to /l/ or back to /t/, but it remains evident that the language went through a /tɬ/ stage.

In 1996, Alexis Manaster Ramer showed that the sound change had in fact also happened before the Proto-Aztecan high central vowel */ɨ/, itself derived from */u/ in certain situations, and not just before */a/.

Today, the best-known Nahuan language is Nahuatl.
