= Maya Hickmann =

Linguist

Maya Hickmann (born 19 May 1953 in Egypt; died 26 September 2019) was a linguist who specialized in language acquisition and psycholinguistics.

== Education ==
Born in Egypt, Hickmann spent her early life in Paris. She studied in the US, obtaining first a BA in psychology at Cornell University in 1973, then an MA from the University of Chicago in 1975. Her PhD, awarded in 1982 by the same institution, dealt with the development of children's narrative skills and discourse cohesion, and was supervised by David McNeill.

== Career and honours ==
On her return to Europe in 1981, Hickmann took up a position as staff scientist at the newly founded Max Planck Institute for Psycholinguistics in Nijmegen under the direction of Wolfgang Klein. She spent ten years there, before moving to France in 1992 for a position at the Experimental Psychology Laboratory of the French National Centre for Scientific Research (CNRS) based at Paris Descartes University. In 1998 she received her habilitation, and in 2000 she was promoted to senior scientist (directrice de recherche). From 2008 she was co-director of the Formal Structures of Language lab, which she and Clive Perdue had founded in 2007.

In 2008 Hickman was elected ordinary member of the Academia Europaea. In the same year she founded the journal Language, Interaction and Acquisition, building on the existing journal Acquisition et Interaction en Langue Etrangère (Acquisition and Interaction in a Foreign Language; AILE) set up by Perdue.

== Research ==
Hickmann's research took an experimental approach to big questions in psycholinguistics and language acquisition, especially acquisition by multilingual children. She was particularly interested in the development of discourse structure, and maintained research interests in linguistic typology and linguistic universals. She worked with both typically and atypically developing populations, and her work on the development of motion expressions and spatial expressions has been particularly influential.

== Selected publications ==
- Kail, Michèle, and Maya Hickmann. 1992. French children's ability to introduce referents in narratives as a function of mutual knowledge. First Language 12 (34), 73–94. doi:10.1177/014272379201203405
- Hickmann, Maya. 1996. Discourse Organization and the Development of Reference to Person, Space, and Time. In Paul Fletcher & Brian MacWhinney (eds.), The Handbook of Child Language, 194–218. Oxford: Blackwell. doi:10.1111/b.9780631203124.1996.00008.x
- Hickmann, Maya, Henriëtte Hendriks, Françoise Roland and James Liang. 1996. The marking of new information in children's narratives: a comparison of English, French, German and Mandarin Chinese. Journal of Child Language 23 (3), 591–619. doi:10.1017/S0305000900008965
- Hickmann, Maya, and Henriëtte Hendriks. 1999. Cohesion and anaphora in children's narratives: A comparison of English, French, German, and Mandarin Chinese. Journal of Child Language 26 (2), 419–452. doi:10.1017/S0305000999003785
- Hickmann, Maya. 2002. Children's discourse: person, space and time across languages. Cambridge: Cambridge University Press. ISBN 9781139435147
