= WRF =

WRF may refer to:

- Weather Research and Forecasting model, a numerical weather prediction system
- Westminster Russia Forum, a UK organization promoting improved relations with Russia
- Wiley Rein & Fielding, a Washington, DC–based law firm
- World Reformed Fellowship, an ecumenical Christian organization
- World Resources Forum, the global science-based platform for sharing knowledge about sustainable resource management
