= Warrenton Aquatic and Recreation Facility =

Coordinates: 38.7173°N 77.8188°W

George B. Fitch Warrenton Aquatic and Recreation Facility
- Alternative names: The Warrenton Aquatic and Recreation Facility; The WARF

General information
- Location: Warrenton, Virginia, US
- Named for: George B. Fitch
- Construction started: October 1, 2006
- Construction stopped: July 7, 2007
- Cost: 22 million USD
- Owner: Town of Warrenton

Technical details
- Floor count: 3
- Floor area: 59,738 square feet (5,549.8 m^{2})
- Grounds: 64 acres (26 hectares)

Design and construction
- Architects: Grim & Parker Architects; John McBryde Hill
- Structural engineer: Elliot, Leboeuf, & Associates
- Services engineer: B2E Consulting
- Civil engineer: Rickmond Engineering Inc.
- Main contractor: Forrester Construction Co.
- Awards: ABC Metro Washington Excellence in Construction Award; Northern Virginia NAIOP Award of Merit

The George B. Fitch Warrenton Aquatic and Recreation Facility, commonly acronymized as The WARF, is a town-owned recreation center and accompanying park in Warrenton, Virginia. The Town of Warrenton Parks and Recreation Department is situated within the facility.

The facility offers a variety of memberships and day passes to individuals based on their residency. The WARF also hosts various fitness classes and special events for holidays and reservations.

== History ==
The WARF opened in September 2007 after 18 months of construction.

The WARF temporarily closed to the public in March 2020 due to the COVID-19 pandemic. The closure followed orders from the Virginia Governor and the U.S. President regarding the pandemic. The WARF reopened in July 2020.

A graduate student from George Mason University surveyed WARF members in 2021 to determine their desire to return to the WARF after the COVID-19 pandemic as part of a required independent study course.

In April 2023 a water main break caused damage to the walkway leading to the facility's main entrance. Construction to repair this began in December 2024 and will be completed in 2025.

== Design and Facilities ==
The building's design was inspired by historical farming of the Virginia Piedmont region, on which the WARF is situated. Because of this, the building has a vestibule inspired by a grain silo, a broad gable roof inspire by farmhouses, and a warm interior pallet largely consisting of exposed wood.

The recreation center consists of three floors: a lower floor, a main floor, and two penthouses. The main floor consists largely of a reception area, spectator seating, a cylindrical vestibule, fitness rooms, and office space. The lower floor contains a 364,000 gallon competition pool, a 68,000 gallon leisure pool, a 3,600 gallon hot tub, and a water slide.

The building was built on a large piece of land, with various rectangular playing fields situated around it. Additionally, there are a variety of paved walking paths, a year-round outdoor ice skating rink, a playground, and a skateboard park on the grounds.

== Awards ==
The facility and its contractors have won two awards. The Associated Builders and Contractors (ABC) Metro Washington awarded Forrester Construction Company with a 2008 Excellence in Construction Award for the WARF. The Commercial Real Estate Development Association (NAIOP) Northern Virginia awarded Forrester Construction Company a 2008 Award of Merit for the WARF, as well.
