= Wharf Theatre (disambiguation) =

Wharf Theatre is a theatre venue in Sydney, Australia.

Wharf Theatre (or Theater) may also refer to:

- Wharf Theater, a theatre company and venue in Monterey, California
- Wharf Theatre, an early venue used by the Provincetown Players
- Long Wharf Theatre, a theatre company and venue in New Haven, Connecticut
