= WJR =

News/talk radio station in Detroit

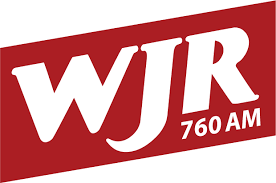
- Detroit, Michigan; United States
- Broadcast area: Metro Detroit
- Frequency: 760 kHz
- Branding: News Talk 760 WJR

Programming
- Format: News/talk
- Affiliations: Fox News Radio; Westwood One; Michigan State Spartans

Ownership
- Owner: Cumulus Media; (Radio License Holdings LLC)
- Sister stations: WDVD

History
- First air date: May 4, 1922
- Former call signs: WCX (1922–1925); WJR-WCX (1925–1929)
- Former frequencies: 833 & 619 kHz (1922); 750 & 619 kHz (1922–1923); 750 kHz (1923); 580 kHz (1923–1927); 680 kHz (1927–1928); 750 kHz (1928–1941)
- Call sign meaning: Former owner Jewett Radio & Phonograph Co.

Technical information
- Licensing authority: FCC
- Facility ID: 8626
- Class: A
- Power: 50,000 watts (unlimited)
- Transmitter coordinates: 42°10′5″N 83°12′54″W (main); 42°10′8″N 83°12′50″W (aux)
- Repeater: 96.3 WDVD-HD2 (Detroit)

Links
- Public license information: Public file; LMS
- Webcast: Listen live
- Website: www.wjr.com

WJR (760 kHz) is a commercial AM radio station in Detroit, Michigan. It is owned by Cumulus Media, with a news/talk format. Most of WJR's broadcast studios, along with its newsroom and offices, are in the Fisher Building in Detroit's New Center area. A tower atop the Fisher Building relays WJR's audio to the transmitter site, and at one time WJR-FM (currently WDVD) also used this tower.

WJR is a Class A clear channel station, operating with 50,000 watts, the maximum power for AM stations in the United States, around the clock. WJR's 1934 transmitter building — which has been called "one of the best Art Deco transmitter buildings ever" — and transmitter tower are located near (and visible from) the intersection of Sibley and Grange Roads in Riverview, Michigan.

Due to WJR's low transmitting frequency and high power, omnidirectional signal, plus the region's mostly flat land and good ground conductivity, the station has unusually large daytime coverage, equivalent to that of a full-power FM station. Its daytime signal provides at least secondary coverage to most of the southern Lower Peninsula, as well as almost half of Ohio (with Cleveland and Toledo getting city-grade coverage) and slivers of Indiana and Pennsylvania. At night it can be heard throughout much of eastern North America with a good radio.

WJR programming is streamed via the web, and is simulcast on WDVD's 96.3 FM HD2 subchannel. WJR is also licensed to broadcast a digital hybrid (HD) signal.

WJR is Michigan's primary entry point station for the Emergency Alert System.

== Programming ==
WJR airs a mix of local and nationally syndicated talk shows and local sports. Weekdays feature a local lineup beginning with an hour of news at dawn, followed by JR Mornings with Lloyd Jackson and Jamie Edwards. Middays are hosted by Kevin Dietz and Paul W. Smith followed by afternoon personalities Chris Renwick and Mitch Albom. Sports talk shows are heard in the early evening with an hour of brokered programming. At night, syndicated conservative talk programs include The Mark Levin Show, The Guy Benson Show and Red Eye Radio.

Weekends feature specialty shows on money, health, gardening, education, travel, religion, golf and home repair, some of which are paid brokered programming. Repeats of some weekday shows are also heard, as well as Sunday Night with Bill Cunningham. Late nights and weekends, most hours begin with an update from Fox News Radio. The WJR news department provides newscasts on weekdays.

WJR is the flagship station of Michigan State Spartans football and men's basketball. In the mid-1980s, it had been the flagship for the Michigan Panthers USFL pro football team.

== History ==
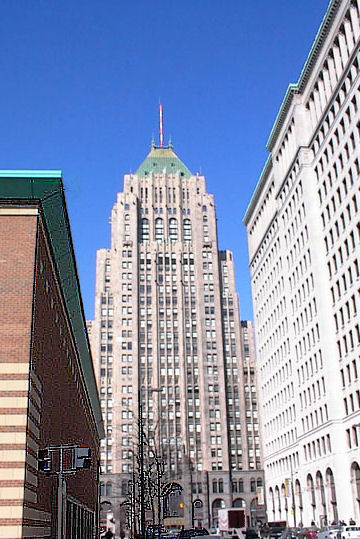
The Fisher Building, a National Historic site in the city's New Center area, is home to the Fisher Theatre, with the WJR radio antenna, presently used to relay audio to the transmitters for WJR and WDVD

=== WCX ===
WJR traces its history to May 4, 1922. Effective December 1, 1921, the U.S. government for the first time adopted regulations formally defining "broadcasting stations". The wavelength of 360 meters (833 kHz) was designated for entertainment broadcasts, while 485 meters (619 kHz) was reserved for broadcasting official weather and other government reports. On May 4, 1922, the Detroit Free Press newspaper was issued a license, with the randomly assigned callsign WCX, for operation on both broadcasting wavelengths.

WCX made its debut, broadcasting from the Free Press Building, on the same day it was licensed. The inaugural broadcast included an address by Michigan governor Alex J. Groesbeck. 1922 saw a rapid expansion in the number of broadcasting stations, most sharing the single entertainment wavelength of 360 meters, which required progressively more complicated time sharing schedules among stations in the same region. The Detroit News, which operated station WWJ, bristled at having to suffer the "handicap" of being required to give up some airtime to WCX, which had, in the words of the News, decided to "break in".

In late September 1922 a second entertainment wavelength, 400 meters (750 kHz), was made available for "Class B" stations, which had higher powers and better quality equipment and programming. Both WCX and WWJ qualified to use this new wavelength on a timesharing basis, and WCX ended use of the 485 meter "market and weather" wavelength. In early 1923, the United States further expanded the broadcast station frequencies into a band running from 550 to 1350 kHz. The Class B frequency of 580 kHz was designated for use by qualified stations in the "Detroit/Dearborn" area, and both WCX and WWJ were assigned to this frequency.

On December 8, 1924, WCX opened studios atop the new Book-Cadillac Hotel in downtown Detroit, with transmitter facilities on the roof. Hometown poet Edgar A. Guest and the Jean Goldkette orchestra participated in the program. In January 1925, WWJ's reassignment to 850 kHz left WCX as the sole station remaining on 580 kHz.

=== WJR-WCX ===
On August 20, 1925, the Jewett Radio & Phonograph Company received a license for a new station, WJR. The company also took over WCX, consolidating operations in Pontiac, Michigan, as WJR-WCX on 580 kHz.

=== Goodwill Station ownership ===
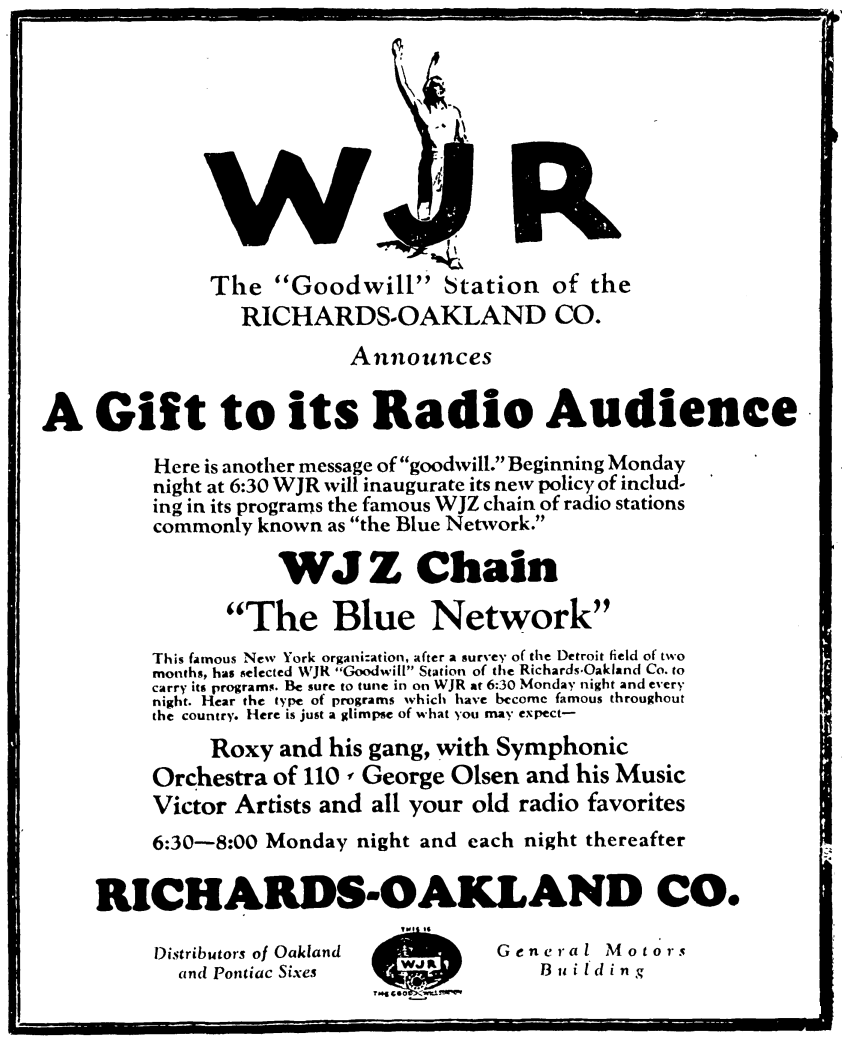
1927 saw the adoption of the slogan "The Goodwill Station", plus NBC Blue network programs beginning on May 9.

On January 1, 1927, the station was taken over by George A. Richards, a local Oakland-Pontiac automobile dealer. Richards would later also assume control of WGAR in Cleveland and KMPC in Los Angeles. WJR adopted the slogan "The Goodwill Station" and on May 9, 1927, began carrying programs from the recently formed NBC Blue Network.

In mid-1927, the joint stations moved to 680 kHz. On November 11, 1928, the Federal Radio Commission implemented a major AM band reorganization, under the provisions of its General Order 40. This reallocation divided stations into three classes, which became known as "Clear", "Regional" and "Local". WJR-WCX was assigned as the sole North American occupant of the clear channel frequency of 750 kHz.

On December 16, 1928, the station moved from the newspaper's offices to its current location in the Fisher Building in uptown Detroit, and began identifying as "WJR Detroit, from the Golden Tower of the Fisher Building". In 1929, the license was transferred to "WJR, Goodwill Station, Inc.", and on April 22, 1929, "WCX" was formally dropped from the dual call sign, with the station becoming just WJR. In 1931, WJR raised its power to 10,000 watts. The station switched network affiliation from NBC Blue to CBS on September 29, 1935, and at the same time station officials formally dedicated WJR's new 50,000-watt transmitter. On March 29, 1941, the station moved from 750 to 760 kHz, in accordance with the North American Regional Broadcasting Agreement frequency reallocations.

Although station owner George A. Richards purchased the Detroit Lions professional football team in 1934, WJR did not begin to broadcast their games until the 1938 season.

WJR signed on an FM outlet in 1948, on 96.3 MHz. This station was known as WJR-FM until 1982, when it became WHYT. The station is now WDVD.

=== Capital Cities ownership ===
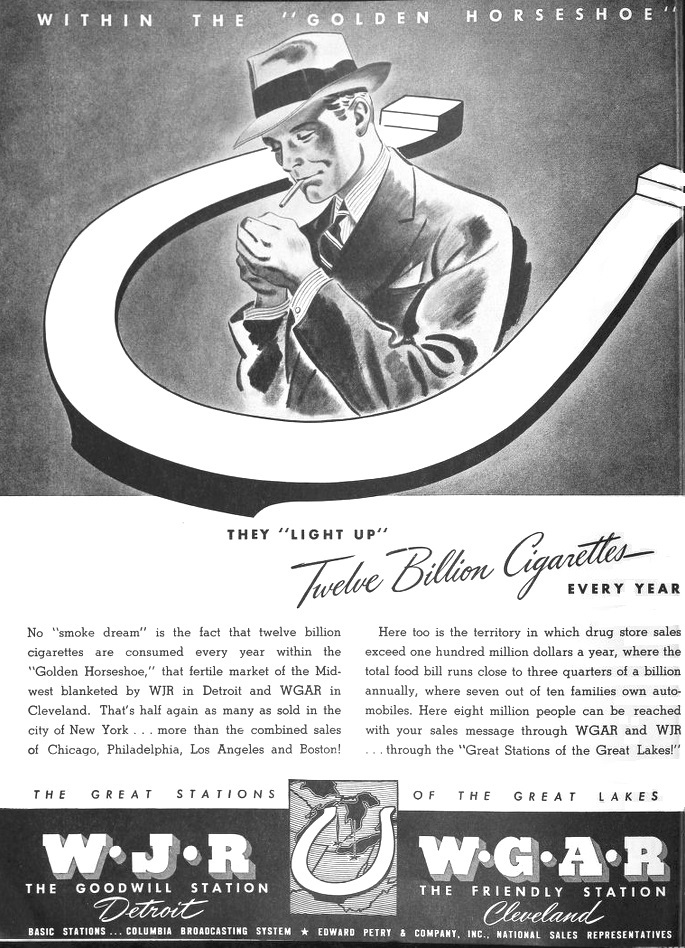
In 1939, coverage by WJR and co-owned WGAR in Cleveland, "The Great Stations of the Great Lakes", was promoted as providing advertisers the ability to reach a "Golden Horseshoe" of midwestern listeners.

Richards died in May 1951, and in 1964, Goodwill Stations was sold to Capital Cities Communications, which later merged with ABC and still later with the Walt Disney Company. Upon the sale, WJR's slogan became "The Great Voice of the Great Lakes". Also in 1964, WJR acquired full rights to Detroit Tigers baseball games, with announcers Ernie Harwell and George Kell, who had begun broadcasting Tiger games in 1960. Previously, WJR had carried only night games with day games on WKMH and WJBK. The station became the flagship of the Tiger Baseball Network.In the late 1960s, WJR also became the flagship station for Detroit Red Wings hockey and Detroit Pistons basketball.

The station's advertising campaigns and jingles included "W-J-R ... Radio 76 ... Cares About Detroit" and "This is America's finest - AM stereo 76". J. P. McCarthy regularly stated, in a nonchalant way, "This is the world's greatest radio station, WJR Detroit", with a manner that made it seem like the most obvious of facts.

WJR broadcast in C-QUAM AM stereo, from 1982 to 2006, and was received in stereo at great distances at night. WJR's Detroit Tigers home games were broadcast in stereo, as were the Thanksgiving Day Parades.

For much of its history, WJR served as a powerhouse in Michigan sports radio. However, in 2001, the station lost its longtime flagship rights to the Detroit Tigers and Detroit Red Wings, both of which moved to CBS-owned WXYT and WXYT-FM. Then, in 2005, the station dropped its status as the flagship station for Michigan Wolverines football and basketball in favor of a flagship rights deal with the Michigan State Spartans. WJR had served as flagship for Michigan State prior to 1976.

=== Cumulus Media ownership ===
WJR was sold with other ABC Radio stations to Citadel Broadcasting on June 12, 2007. Citadel merged with Cumulus Media on September 16, 2011.

WJR broadcast an HD Radio signal for about a two-year period (2006–2008) (also on WDRQ's HD2 digital subchannel), eventually eliminating night time HD radio use, then dropping it completely on both WJR and WDRQ-HD2, returning to only its analog signal.

On November 20, 2015, WJR announced it would take over as flagship station of the Detroit Lions in 2016, with the team moving over from WXYT-FM. The live sporting events meant that regular programming might be pre-empted. (During parts of the season when Michigan football and Tiger baseball were both on, Tiger baseball took precedence, and if a Michigan football game was either just beginning or really good when Tiger baseball came on, an announcement would come on as the football game faded out, stating the need to switch due to contractual obligations. Otherwise, the announcement would just simply state the station is leaving the Michigan game for the Tigers. Either way, listeners were directed to CKLW in nearby Windsor, Ontario, for the conclusion of the game).

Previous logo

On December 18, 2020, the Detroit Lions announced that Audacy signed a deal for WXYT-FM to become the flagship station for the 2021 NFL season after a five-year partnership.

For many years, WJR aired Rush Limbaugh in early afternoons. Following Limbaugh's death in 2021, Dan Bongino took over the noon to 3 pm time slot on WJR and many other Cumulus stations. Bongino's show is distributed by Westwood One, which is the national syndication arm of Cumulus Media. Following disputes with Westwood One and Cumulus over a COVID-19 vaccine mandate, Bongino announced plans to end his Cumulus radio show at the end of his contract 18 months in the future. Cumulus began phasing his show out of its stations' lineups, including WJR in June 2023. At that time, WJR announced a new lineup of local personalities weekdays from 5 am to 8 pm. Morning show host Paul W. Smith would move to early afternoons in place of Bongino, with Guy Gordon who previously hosted afternoons moving to morning drive. New shows hosted by Chris Renwick and Sean Baligian were also added to the schedule.

== Father Coughlin broadcasts ==
Father Charles Coughlin was a local Roman Catholic priest, whose controversial weekly radio sermons largely originated at WJR. At the height of his popularity, Coughlin reported receiving thousands of letters daily. He was also extremely polarizing, described by one biographer as "a man of kindness and beautiful understanding", while another labeled him "the father of hate radio".

Father Coughlin made his radio debut on October 17, 1926, speaking over WJR via a microphone installed by the station at the altar at the Shrine of the Little Flower. His commentaries initially addressed perceived social ills, opposing prohibition, divorce and birth control as damaging to American society. During the Great Depression he moved heavily into political issues. On October 5, 1930, he began a weekly broadcast carried over the CBS network that originated at that network's Detroit affiliate, WXYZ. But a year later CBS dropped him for being too divisive, by implementing a ban on commercially sponsored religious programs. With the assistance of WJR station manager Leo Fitzpatrick, Father Coughlin responded by forming his own network, with WJR as the key station. "The Golden Hour" broadcasts began on October 4, 1931, initially on about 20 stations. By October 16 of the next year this expanded to 26 stations, said at the time to be "the largest independent network ever arranged", and by early 1938 the network had grown to 58 stations.

Coughlin's fervent anti-communism led to the perception that he was in favor of the rise of fascism in Europe, and he was accused of being anti-Jewish. Although initially supported by the local church hierarchy, his personal attacks on political figures eventually resulted in official restrictions and rebukes. In 1939 the National Association of Broadcasters (NAB) adopted a code of conduct that included restrictions on controversial commercial broadcasts, which was seen as primarily directed toward Coughlin, and WJR vice president John F. Pratt argued that "the provision on controversial subjects seems to many of us the first shackle on freedom of speech on the radio". The NAB code led to a loss of participating stations, and this, combined with subject matter restrictions imposed by his church superiors, resulted in Coughlin ending his radio broadcasts.

== WJR personalities ==
Past WJR personalities included J.P. McCarthy, Jimmy Launce, Warren Pierce, Mike Whorf, Murray Gula, Joel Alexander, Jay Roberts, Charles Coughlin and many others. WJR Program Directors during the Capital Cities era included Joe Bacarella, Curt Hahn and AC radio consultant Gary Berkowitz.

- Mitch Albom, novelist and Detroit Free Press sports writer . WJR was the flagship station when The Mitch Albom Show (formerly Albom in the Afternoon) was nationally syndicated.
- Frank Beckmann, former midday talk show host (also the play-by-play voice for University of Michigan football from 1981 to 2013). WJR was the flagship station for Michigan football from 1977 to 2005. Beckmann formerly called Lions and Tigers games for the station.
- Paul Carey, former Detroit Tigers and Detroit Pistons announcer
- Father Charles Coughlin, Roman Catholic priest, and social and political commentator
- Guy Gordon, early afternoon drive host, former WXYZ-TV and WDIV-TV reporter and anchor.
- Edgar A. "Bud" Guest II, host of "The Sunny Side of the Street" and "Guest House".
- Karl Haas, German-born musicologist who hosted the classical music magazine Adventures in Good Music (later originating from Cleveland station WCLV)
- Ernie Harwell, former Detroit Tigers announcer (when WJR was the Tigers' flagship station).
- Lloyd Jackson Sr., Assistant News Director and News Anchor and host of The Big Story
- Kevin Joyce, former conservative talk show host
- Bruce Martyn, former Detroit Red Wings announcer
- J.P. McCarthy, former morning host
- Jack Paar, Tonight Show host
- Van Patrick, former sports director and announcer
- Bob Reynolds, former Detroit Lions and Michigan State football announcer
- Jay Roberts, host of the overnight music program Night Flight 760
- Paul W. Smith, current morning host
- Ted Strasser, host of the adult standards program Patterns in Music
- Grace Lee Whitney, actress-singer, later "Janice Rand" on Star Trek.
- Mike Whorf, host of the music magazine Kaleidoscope, which focused on various music genres, themes, and eras

== See also ==
- Media in Detroit
- List of initial AM-band station grants in the United States
- List of three-letter broadcast call signs in the United States
