= John Whorf =

American painter (1903–1959)

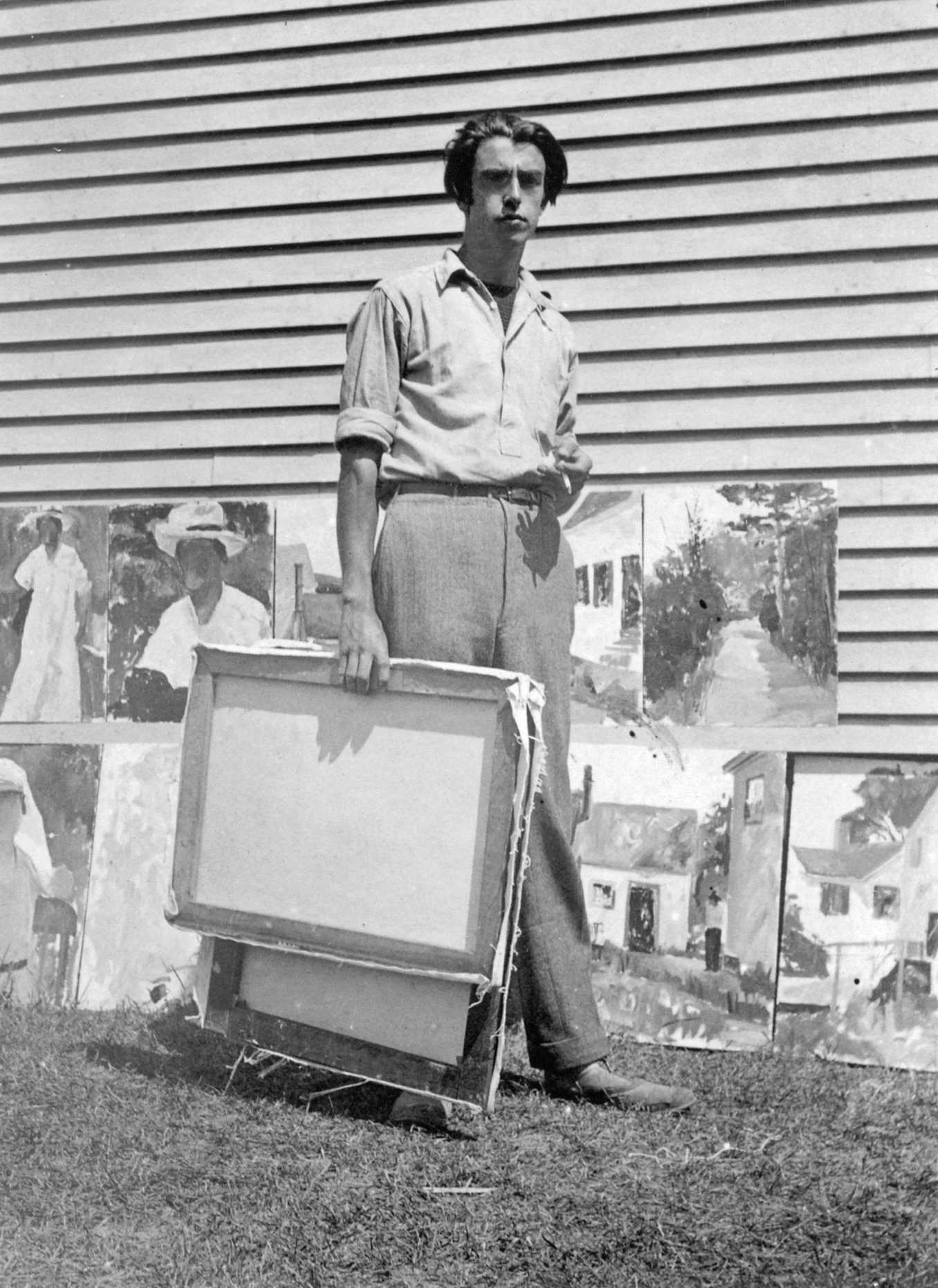
- John Whorf in Provincetown, about 1923
- Born: John Calderwood Whorf; January 10, 1903; Winthrop, Massachusetts
- Died: February 13, 1959 (aged 56); Provincetown, Massachusetts
- Resting place: Provincetown Cemetery, Provincetown, Massachusetts

John Whorf (1903–1959) was an American realist artist who is best known for his watercolors. From his first exhibition in 1923 until the last in 1958, his work remained popular with both critics and collectors. In 1929, art historian Lloyd Goodrich said Whorf had "inherited the mantel" of John Singer Sargent, adding, "Mr. Whorf, although he is still under 30, is perhaps the most brilliant watercolorist in America today, if we take 'brilliancy' to mean a breath-taking skill in depicting reality." A bit later, the essayist and critic Lewis Mumford wrote that Whorf's paintings "are perhaps the finest example of current realism one can find anywhere, not excepting the water colors of Hopper."

Born in a Massachusetts North Shore town, Whorf spent his childhood summers in Provincetown and later made his home within Provincetown's art community. He received his first art training from his father, a commercial artist, and subsequently in a Boston museum school, in Provincetown's summer art sessions, and, briefly, in two Paris art academies. He traveled to Europe while still in his teens, there establishing his preference for watercolors over oils, and returned with enough work to stage his first solo exhibitions. These shows received favorable reviews from critics and resulted in many purchases by collectors. Looking back on them, a reviewer for the Christian Science Monitor later wrote that he had "leapt into fame with no preliminaries".

Whorf's choice of subjects and style of painting varied little over the course of his career. He made landscapes, seascapes, and marines; cityscapes and scenes of country life; paintings of circuses, gypsies, and other genre subjects; as well as nudes and some still lifes. Recognizing this breadth of subject matter, New York Times' critic Howard Devree wrote in 1937 that "Whorf's shore papers make feel the cold spray blown sting inland and evoke the feel of power in the serried waves rushing the land. But he has an eye for wet vistas of city streets, houses and trees by day and night with intricate play of shadows, and the hunter or angler going about his pursuits."

Critics called attention to Whorf's skill as a colorist, the artistry of his compositions, his "free and bold brushwork", and a gift he was seen to possess to convey "vital human interest". They also mentioned the emotions evident in his paintings. One said they were expressive and uninhibited. Whorf himself once told an interviewer, "To be a great artist, one must be a fanatic. Today, most of them think too much and feel too little." In a 1934 review of Whorf's paintings, New York Times critic Edward Alden Jewell said his paintings were able to attract the viewer's attention with "a magnet of strangeness and piquant spiritual adventure." He said Whorf's "naturalism is suffused with a kind of magic that never detachedly defines an image of the thing itself, but always conjures an image that has been caught and distilled for us by the artist."

In 1959, Whorf died of heart disease while being transported by ambulance from his home in Provincetown to a hospital in Hyannis.

== Early life and training ==
Whorf was born and raised in a town north of Boston called Winthrop, Massachusetts. Once asked when he started painting, he said it was earlier than he could recall. Recognizing his interest, both parents supported him, and his father, a commercial artist, was his first teacher. In 1917, aged 14, he studied under a marine painter who worked in the art department his father headed, and after entering Winthrop's high school, he took part time instruction at the Museum School in Boston under the Impressionist painter Philip Leslie Hale. During the summer months of 1917 and 1918, he worked under the landscape artist George Elmer Browne and the figurative painter Richard Miller. For six summers, beginning in 1917, Whorf painted with the portraitist and noted teacher Charles Webster Hawthorne, from whom he later said he gained "an appreciation of the overwhelming beauty of light and color." He said that among Hawthorne's assistants, John Robinson Frazier was especially helpful. In 1924, a reviewer for The Boston Globe said Whorf's paintings showed the influence of his Provincetown teachers and the artists he met there. The critic wrote: "The whole artistic atmosphere of Provincetown influenced him and helped shape him. So that somehow you feel the characteristics of several big Provincetown personalities in his work."

While still in high school, he spent one summer in Europe in a group led by George Elmer Browne and spent others on his own, studying briefly in Paris at the Académie de la Grande Chaumière and Académie Colarossi and extending his travels to North Africa.

== Career in art ==
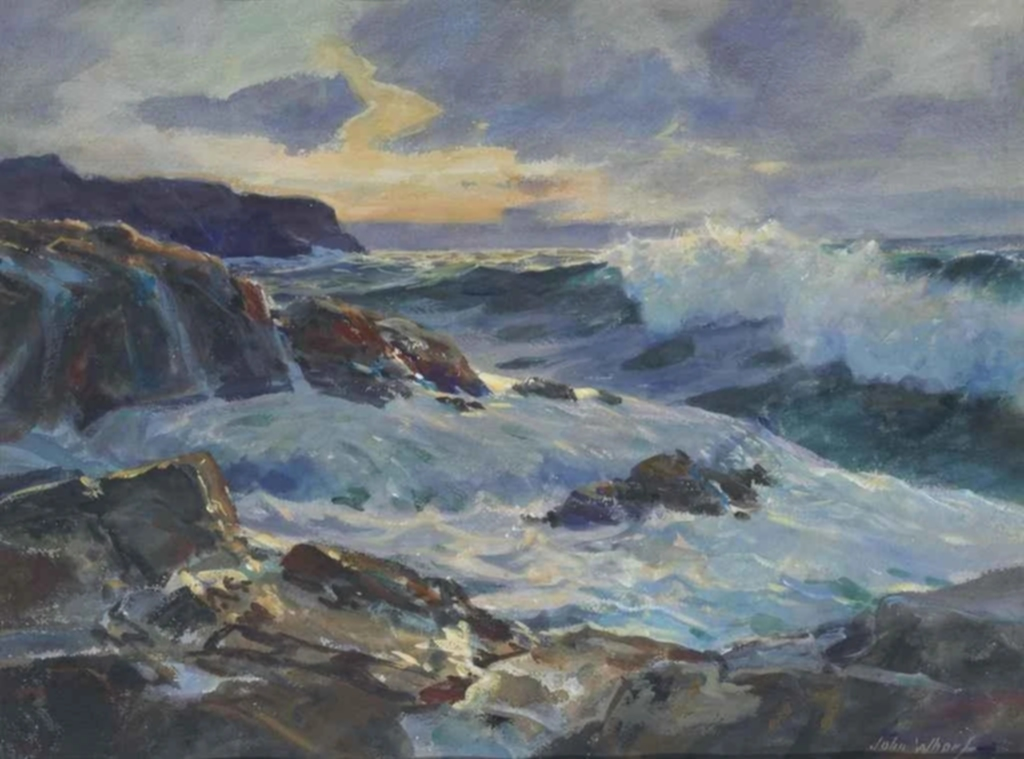
(1) John Whorf, Surf at Sunset, 1923, watercolor, 21 3/4 x 14 3/4 inches

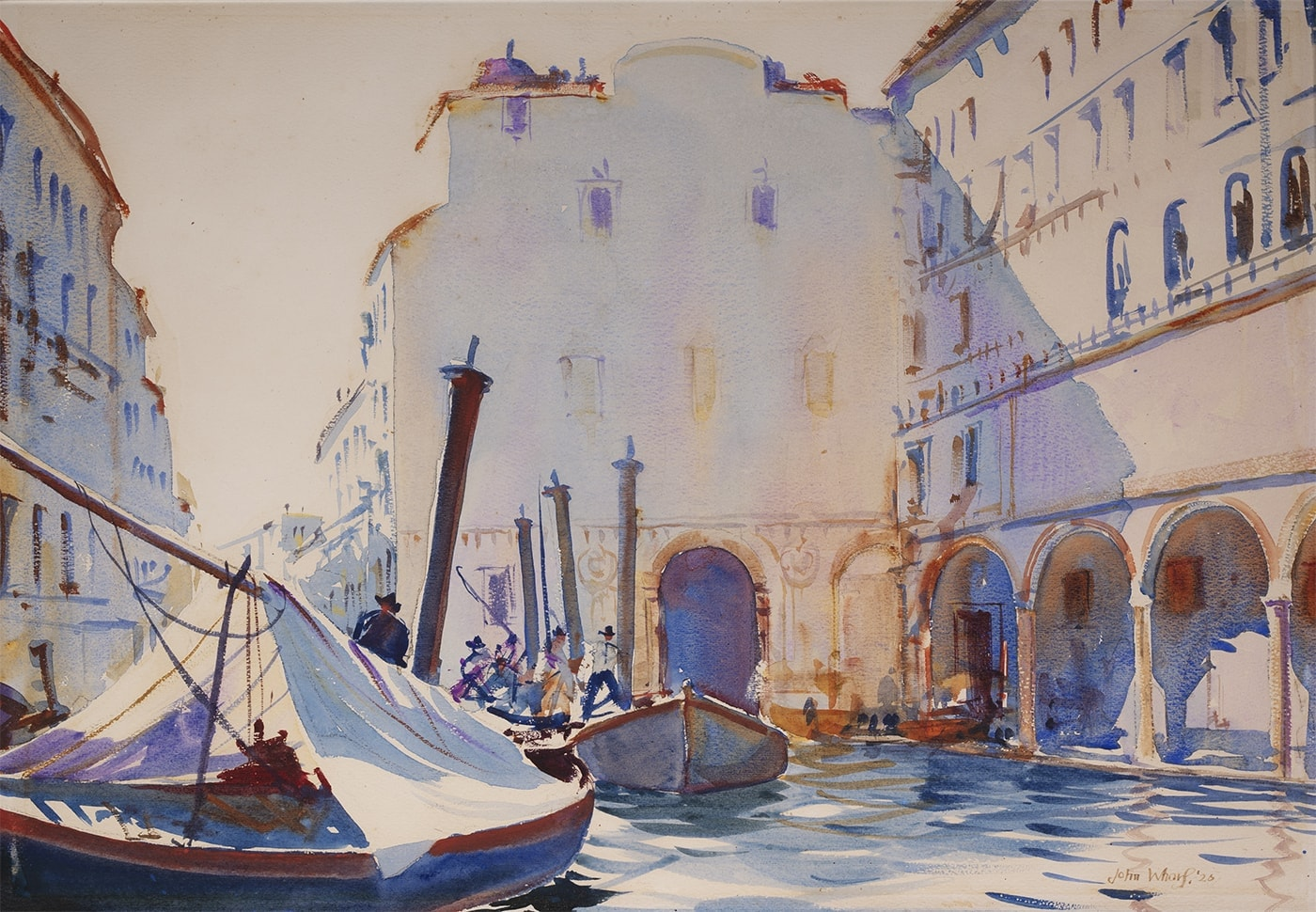
(2) John Whorf, Venice, 1925, watercolor, 14 1/2 x 21 inches

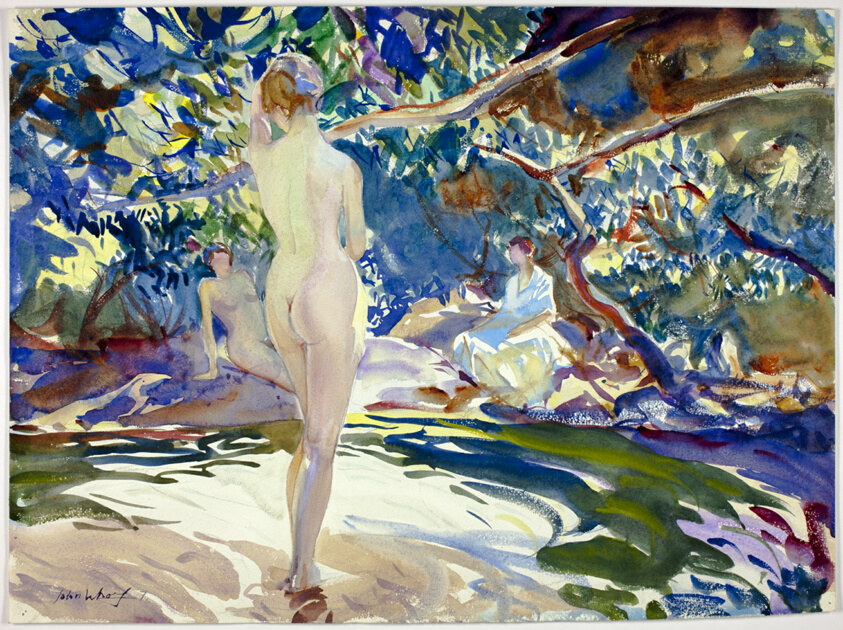
(3) John Whorf, Bathers, about 1927, watercolor over graphite, 19 1/8 x 25 1/4 inches

(4) John Whorf, Sea Apples, about 1930, watercolor over graphite, 16 1/4 x 22 inches

(5) John Whorf, Bridge, Toledo, 1931, watercolor, 20 1/2 x 28 3/4 inches

(6) John Whorf, Rainy Day, 1932, watercolor, wax crayon, and charcoal, 15 1/2 x 21 inches

(7) John Whorf, Frozen In, about 1935, watercolor and pencil, 22 x 30 inches

(8) John Whorf, Untitled (Hunter in Canoe), watercolor, 16 x 22 inches

(9) John Whorf, Winter, North End, Boston, watercolor, 15 1/2 x 22 inches

(10) John Whorf, Snow Palace, about 1940, watercolor, 15 x 21 inches

(11) John Whorf, Dancers, about 1950 watercolor, 21 1/4 x 14 inches

When he was twenty, Whorf gave his first solo exhibition at a parish house in his hometown. The town's two local papers reviewed the show in depth. Their reviewers said the exhibition was a large one, attended by many people. They described the watercolors, oils, and drawings on display using such adjectives as "promising", "splendid", and "alluring". One called a group of Morocco paintings "earnest work" with "brilliant coloring". The Boston Globe also reviewed the show, its critic reporting that Whorf had produced "some exceptional artistic work." The show generated a number of sales and resulted in commissions for two portraits. A few months after this success, the same exhibition moved to a hotel gallery in Hartford, Connecticut, and the following year, a commercial gallery in Boston gave him his first solo exhibition in a city with a large and active art scene. Held in January 1924 in the Grace Horne Gallery, this show received lengthy reviews in two local papers, The Christian Science Monitor and The Boston Globe, and a short notice in the national weekly ARTnews. The Monitor critic noted Whorf's preference for watercolors and praised "the utter simplicity of manner in which the artist achieves sunny atmosphere. semi-transparency and luminous surfaces." The critic for the Globe said the show was an unusually successful one, producing record-breaking sales and declaring that "it was apparent at once that here was a new personality in painting—as fearless in the use of color as a Russian, or a Modern, but sound in technical fundamentals." By the time the show ended, Whorf had sold all fifty-two paintings on display. Purchasers included some of Whorf's fellow artists, including, according to one source, John Singer Sargent.

Whorf's paintings appeared in another solo in August 1924, this time in Gloucester, Massachusetts, and in December, Horne tested the public's enthusiasm for Whorf's work by staging a second solo in her Boston gallery. In the interim, he had again traveled abroad and also spent time in the Berkshires of western Massachusetts. Reviewing the Boston exhibition, a critic for the Boston Globe said Whorf's new work was "even more astounding in its virility and in a certain, definite kind of distinction than that of a year ago." Horne continued to mount Whorf solos for the next four years, most of them drawing favorable critical attention. (Note: Exhibitions at the Horne gallery that drew reviews occurred in 1925, 1926 1927, 1928, and 1931.) In reviewing the 1926 Horne exhibition, a journalist said the Museum of Fine Arts in Boston had purchased a painting, as had some of its trustees. In reviewing the 1928 exhibition, a critic said the galleries were "thronged with excited visitors", many of whom were eager to own one of the paintings. In 1931, a critic for the Christian Science Monitor said this last of the Boston solos "in many respects was the most successful this brilliant pupil of Sargent has yet held." (Note: Though often compared to Sargent, Whorf was not one of his pupils. He studied Sargent's paintings but was never one of his pupils.)

Whorf held his first solo in New York in 1926 when the Milch Galleries showed his work for the first of what would prove to be many occasions between then and the year before his death in 1959. (Note: Exhibitions at the Milch Galleries that drew reviews occurred in 1926 1929, 1930, 1933, 1934, 1935, 1937, 1940, 1943, 1945, 1951, 1956, and 1958.) Of the show held in 1929, Lloyd Goodrich said, "Mr. Whorf, although he is still under 30, is perhaps the most brilliant watercolorist in America today, if we take "brilliancy" to mean a breath-taking skill in depicting reality." Regarding the Milch exhibition of 1930, a writer for Art Digest wrote that many reviewers of Whorf's watercolors considered him a successor to John Singer Sargent. In reviewing the previous year's show, Goodrich had made this thought explicit, saying, "The mantle of John Singer Sargent has certainly fallen upon Mr. Whorf; he already has as much sheer ability of hand and eye, as great a power of making his brush catch the illusive effects of reality with a minimum of apparent effort. Reviewing the 1934 Milch show, Edward Alden Jewell wrote in the New York Times that he showed "amazing ingenuity rooted in knowledge. In 1943, Jewell's colleague Howard Devree saw a "freshness and breadth of vision" in Whorf's paintings at Milch and two years later credited him with "consummate sureness" in that year's show.

In 1927, organizers of the Seventh Annual Invitational Exhibition of Watercolors at the Art Institute of Chicago gave Whorf a gallery to himself in which he showed twenty-two paintings. In discussing the invitation, the museum's monthly bulletin listed the gallery as if it were a solo exhibition." When he was invited again the following year, the museum awarded Whorf its Logan Gold Medal for a painting called "Bathers". (Note: he website of Cavalier Galleries in Greenwich, Connecticut, gives lists of Whorf's exhibitions and of the public collections in which his works are found.) Without naming them, one critic noted "certain technical considerations" in 1924. Another said his use of varnish to enhance contrast was "a doubtful expedient". In 1929, he was said to have overcome "certain blind spots" apparent in earlier work. One saw a lack of "inner warmth" in his work, though less so than in Sargent's. In 1930, he was seen as less able than other artists to "enkindle the quiescent imagination of his audience".

In 1938, at the height of the social realist movement in art, his work was said to lack "contemporary significance". In the post-war years, as abstract expressionism began to gain traction, Howard Devree wrote: "The sternness of advanced taste may object to [Whorf's] prettification of what he sees, but there is no denying his skill nor the sense of serenity that his work exudes." In the year before Whorf's death, Stuart Preston placed him within a group of realist painters who were able to succeed despite the influence of what he called the "advance guard". He wrote: "The tradition of visual facts and their embellishment is too strong in American aesthetics to be uprooted. As in the past, John Whorf's watercolors, a new selection of which is at the Milch Galleries, 21 East Sixty-seventh Street, reveal him as a master illustrator." He said the paintings were almost too straightforwardly realistic, lacking "a sense of personal style that no manual dexterity can ever quite replace."

=== Artistic technique and style ===
Whorf was a realist painter in the American Impressionist tradition. In 1951, a critic said Whorf conceived the process of painting "as an act of absolute fidelity" to his subjects. He was also a colorist. In his watercolors, he used a "free and bold" technique according to one observer, and tended to use a full brush to insure purity and clarity of color. He complemented opaque color areas with fluent use of washes. He was also said to control his wet color well, in order to take effective advantage of "inevitable accidentals" and cannily use white paper for highlights.

In 1926, an unnamed critic described aspects of Whorf's realist style as follows:

He is an impressionist–as are most moderns–and yet there is nothing vague, nothing hesitating, nothing left indistinct through fear of the inability to render it truthfully. He likes to paint sunlight, warmth and glow, yet seldom resorts to a high key for his effects. As a draughtsman he has mastered perspective, and shades and shadows, yet he wisely subordinates these things to the more important function of composition. He gets his impressions and makes his notes direct from nature. He paints, however, in his studio—away from all the actual form and color—working mostly from memory, because he feels that too close an application to any model results in confusion.

— "A Colorist in Watercolor", author not named, Art In America (vol. 14, no. 5, August 1926)

He was credited with "an amazing breadth of artistic sympathies". He painted in New England, Western Europe, and North Africa. He painted landscapes, cityscapes, seascapes, and marines. He made hunting and fishing scenes; circus and ballet scenes. He painted nudes. He painted both at home and abroad. Image No. 1 shows an early seascape. No. 1 shows his treatment of a scene in Venice, a locale that attracted other well-known watercolorists. No. 3 shows one of nudes. This painting won an award when shown at the Art Institute of Chicago in 1928. No. 4 is an early mid-career shore scene. No. 5 shows a Spanish theme. No. 6 is a cityscape that shows his handling of wet weather. No. 7 shows his interest in depicting men struggling against the elements. No. 8 is a winter hunting scene. No. 9 is an urban winter scene. No. 10 shows a relatively abstract winter scene. No. 11 shows his interest in ballet.

He explained his preference for watercolor by saying he "could not get the same rapidity of color in an oil," Remembering his first trip to Europe, he wrote: "Strange how it happened. I was living in Paris at that time and had decided to go down to Pamplona, Spain, for the bullfights. Instead of lugging around oils, I decided to take watercolors along because they were lighter and easy to carry. And ever since then, it's been watercolors."

Whorf also once wrote that of the old masters he most admired Valasquez and Rembrandt and of modern artists Whistler, Renoir, Degas, Monet, Manet, Sargent, and Homer. Critics compared him to other watercolorists, including Dodge MacKnight as well as Sargent and Homer, but he was seen to have his own unique style. As one critic said, "Mr. Whorf is not an imitator. He does not produce pseudo-Sargents. But he has with original energy carried over into his work something of the master's directness and spontaneity." Another wrote of his watercolors: "No matter where he paints there is always that John Whorf something in them that is unmistakable. The personal equation is strong in them."

Whorf painted in a studio, often just an unused room in his house. He was prolific, regularly producing enough new work to fill his annual solos and other exhibitions, and had, as one critic said, "a bold assurance in his chosen medium." On one occasion, his paintings were said to reveal an "emotional and uninhibited" temperament. In 1928, a critic said his style was daring but did not diverge from the norm; he was not a stylistic innovator, but distinguished himself by painting with great intensity. Late in his career, a critic said his style was an easily recognizable one that changed little over time.

In 1924, the critic, A.J.Philpott, addressed the individuality in Whorf's style:

No matter where he paints there is always that John Whorf something in [his paintings] that is unmistakable. The personal equation is strong in them. In most of his pictures there are vivid and dramatic color contrasts. He loves blues, yellows and reds and vivid greens. He loves sunshine. He conveys the idea of sunshine with a simple palette. He uses his watercolors pure and without medium, other than the water to flow the color... His compositions are always well balanced in line and color—even his sketches. But essentially he is a colorist. Yet that doesn't tell the whole story. If it did he wouldn't amount to much in the long run. There was sentiment in many of these pictures—they touched the imagination in other than a color sense. He thinks as well as feels his picture. The scene ls as he feels it.

— "John C. Whorf Sells 52 Pictures at First Exhibit", by A.J. Philpott, Boston Globe, January 28, 1924

== Personal life and family ==
Whorf was born on January 10, 1903, in Winthrop, Massachusetts. His father, Harry Church Whorf (1874–1934), was head of the art department at a Boston printing firm called Oxford Press. His mother was Sarah Edna Lee Whorf (1844–1922). His siblings were Benjamin Atwood Lee Whorf (1897–1941), Julia Stewart Whorf (1899–1904), and Richard Baker Whorf (1906–1966). Julia died young of pneumonia. Benjamin grew up to become a highly regarded linguist, and Richard became an actor, writer, and film director. The two brothers, like Whorf himself, benefited from their parents' "great intellectual curiosity" (as one source put it), that they encouraged in their sons.

In 1925, Whorf married a high school classmate, Vivienne Isabelle Wing (1903–1972). They had four children: Carol (1926–2008), John (1927-2010), Nancy (1930–2009), and Michael (1932–2020). Carol and Nancy grew up to become artists, Carol painting under her married name, Carol Whorf Wescott, and Nancy using her family name, Whorf. Nancy would later own a shop in Wellfleet, MA called "Whorf's Landing", where she'd decorate and sell painted furniture under the style of her earlier American/Peter Hunt days. Michael became a radio personality and John a commercial artist and craftsman..

The family's first home was in Brookline, Massachusetts. In 1934, they moved to Provincetown where they remained for the rest of Whorf's life.

Whorf was friendly and outgoing. He spent long hours conversing with the artists, fishermen, and other residents of Provincetown and valued his role as one of Provincetown's Beachcombers, a club begun by artists that later grew to include writers and other creative professionals. Nonetheless, he did not like giving interviews and was described by his son Michael as a private person.

During his adult life, Whorf walked with a limp and used a cane. His son Michael said family members used the euphemism "lame" to refer to his disability and variously ascribed the cause as the result of a childhood fall or one of two diseases, poliomyelitis or transverse myelitis. No source that is readily available online gives evidence for any of these three possible causes. One source says he was seventeen and another that he was eighteen when the event occurred.

A reporter described him at the age of twenty-one. He was then somewhat thin and tall, looking "something like a Spaniard". This source also said Whorf was modest and good-natured. A woman who met him when he was working in Provincetown said that in his mid-forties he had a "beautiful head" and was known to swear "like a trooper" and "drink like a fish". In 1931, a reporter said he used a boat he owned to cruise up and down the coast to little fishing communities.

On February 13, 1959, Whorf died of heart disease while being transported by ambulance from his home in Provincetown to a hospital in Hyannis.
