= Warth =

Warth may refer to:

== Places ==
- Warth, Lower Austria, Austria
- Warth, Vorarlberg, Austria
- Warth-Weiningen, Switzerland

== Other uses ==
- Brother Warth, a fictional character in the Blue Lantern Corps
