= J. P. McCarthy =

American radio personality (1933–1995)

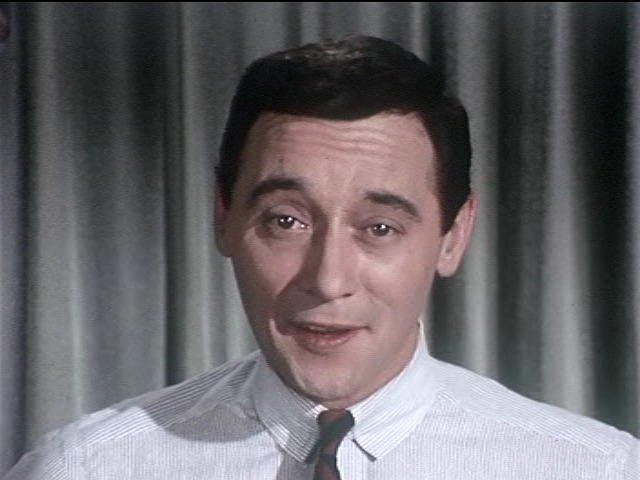
- McCarthy in 1966
- Born: Joseph Priestley McCarthy II; March 22, 1933; New York City, US
- Died: August 16, 1995 (aged 62); New York City, US
- Spouses: Sali Thompson (?–1964); Judy Buttorff (1965–1995; his death)
- Children: 6
- Presenting career
- Stations: KFAR, WTAC, KGO-AM, WJR
- Country: United States

Joseph Priestley "J.P." McCarthy II (March 22, 1933 – August 16, 1995) was a radio personality best known for his over 30 years of work as the morning man and interviewer on station WJR in Detroit, Michigan.

== Early life ==
J.P. McCarthy was born in New York City to John Priestley McCarthy. and Martha Mary Barber McCarthy. The family moved to Detroit when McCarthy was in elementary school. He graduated from De La Salle Collegiate High School in Detroit. It was there he started to perfect the art of conversation by participating in debates. McCarthy briefly attended the University of Detroit, participating in a co-op program with early aspirations to be a draftsman.

McCarthy was drafted into the United States Army and was stationed in Fairbanks, Alaska. There he got his first taste of broadcasting for Armed Forces Radio. He served in the Army from 1953 to 1956, and was a corporal when he became interested in radio.

During his early years in radio, he gained experience at KFAR in Fairbanks (as a part-time job while still in the Army). It was also there that he met and married his first wife, Sali Thompson. They would have five children together: John, Susan, Diane, and twins Kathleen and Kevin.

== Early radio career ==
When his service was up, McCarthy returned to Michigan, settling in Flint. He got a job at Flint radio station WTAC. While at WTAC he frequently auditioned for WJR, a leading radio station in Detroit, with a 50,000-watt clear-channel signal that could be heard in much of the Eastern United States and Canada. After frequent auditions, McCarthy was hired by WJR as a staff announcer in 1956.

The position of staff announcer was merely straight forward announcing, and McCarthy aspired to do more in radio. When Marty McNealy, the host of WJR's Morning Music Hall, left for WKMH in 1958, McCarthy was chosen to replace him. The station promoted him heavily, and he was soon the #1 rated radio show in Detroit.

== Sojourn in San Francisco ==
WJR did not pay particularly well, and J.P. was offered the opportunity to do commercials for Stroh's, the top brewery in Detroit. Station management would not allow it, and after some discussion McCarthy left Detroit for KGO in San Francisco, where he took the morning show from #6 to #3.

In 1964, Goodwill Stations sold WJR to Capital Cities Broadcasting and the president, Dan Burke, asked station manager Jim Quello why they lost McCarthy. After explaining the situation, Quello re-recruited McCarthy to return to WJR, with a raise and the right to do commercials for anybody he wanted. J.P. returned to WJR in December 1964.

== WJR ==
Upon his return to Detroit, McCarthy hosted the Morning Music Hall from 6:15 to 9 and the Afternoon Music Hall from 3:15 to 6. Eventually, McCarthy's duties were changed to morning drive, and a noontime interview program, "Focus". It wasn't long before McCarthy's morning show was #1 in Detroit, a position that he held for about 30 years until his death, a feat unmatched in Detroit radio.

McCarthy divorced upon his return to Detroit and soon after met Judy Buttorf, who worked at General Motors headquarters, which at the time were across the street from the Fisher Building where the WJR studios are located. They married in 1965 and stayed together until McCarthy's death. They had one son together, James (Jamie).

McCarthy's morning show included a mix of music, news, and sports, but his greatest fame was as an interviewer (both on his morning show, and on "Focus"). One morning during the 1992 presidential election, he interviewed President George H. W. Bush and candidates Bill Clinton and Ross Perot all within one hour. Dick Vitale – whom McCarthy was the first to christen "Dicky Vee" – was a regular and friend of the program. Eventually, the music component of the show would be phased out so McCarthy would have more time to concentrate on the news of the day or any topic that would interest him. Former producer Hal Youngblood once said "Everyone is interested in what J. P. is interested in because he makes them interested in it." His curiosity ranged between business, current events, history, entertainment, and other topics.

McCarthy had a great love for sports, especially the Detroit Tigers. He interviewed Tiger managers Billy Martin, Ralph Houk and Sparky Anderson on his shows daily during the baseball season. In 1975, he served as a color commentator on WJR's Detroit Lions broadcasts.

McCarthy occasionally had dialogue with a series of characters created by his friend Robert "Fat Bob" Taylor. Taylor, an aspiring opera singer who earned a living as a plumber, first appeared on the "Focus" show in 1966. Over the years, he developed characters like "Luigi at the Car Wash", and "Mrs. Pennyfeather" (a witty elderly woman). "Grosse Pointe Charles" (a snooty aristocrat), was generally believed to be Taylor, but, according to JPMcCarthy.net, was a real person from one of the "Pointes". Taylor would eventually host his own weekend show on WJR and the morning show at WAAM in Ann Arbor. He died in June 1995.

McCarthy thrived on call-ins, which were rarely screened, with features like "The Answer Man", where he answered callers' questions in a comical voice, "Winners and Losers Of The Day", where callers would nominate local newsmakers for the winner or loser of the day, and "What's Bothering You?", where callers would gripe about what was in the news or issues like rudeness or unscrupulous businesses. But, most popularly, McCarthy would take calls from Detroit executives and celebrities who were his friends.

McCarthy also was known for the stock phrases he would intersperse into his radio show. He opened every show at 6:15 a.m. with the greeting to listeners, "Good mornin' world," and his phrases "They're playing golf somewhere," "It's not the money, it's the amount," "It's brass monkey weather," and "Remember my name in Cheboygan – just don't tell 'em where I am," were only a few that endeared him to his listeners.

== Hobbies and interests ==
McCarthy had plenty of interests, and he would easily discuss them at great length on his morning show, and generate a little criticism in the process. One of McCarthy's passions was golf. He played it frequently as an adult and was an authority on the game and its rules. He belonged to multiple private country clubs, and for a time served as president of the Bloomfield Hills Country Club. He had PGA golfers on his show and broadcast his show from many golf tournaments. One annual event that was dear to him was the annual fundraiser of the Detroit Police Athletic League, where he persuaded professional golfers to participate in pro-ams.

Another McCarthy interest was sailing. He owned several private boats over the course of his life and would frequently chart courses on the Great Lakes. He even broadcast his show in 1987 from Fremantle, Australia, when American skipper Dennis Conner reclaimed the America's Cup from Australia.

McCarthy would also broadcast his show live from the Tokyo Motor Show, Geneva Motor Show, and the Paris Auto Show, chatting with automotive luminaries and reporting on obscure European and Asian makes. He also hosted the televised charity preview at the Detroit Auto Show.

McCarthy was proud of his Irish-American heritage. One highlight of each year was McCarthy's annual St. Patrick's Day broadcast, where he would invite local celebrities and politicians to drop by. The event began in the lobby of WJR at the Fisher Building and blossomed, until one thousand invitees showed up at the Fox Theatre in 1995. The broadcast is still a major event on WJR.

== Illness and death ==
By 1995, McCarthy had dropped the "Focus" interview program from his duties to concentrate on the morning show. He had been in talks to take his program into national syndication through a production company he started with his producer, Michael Patrick Shiels.

But in the early summer of that year, McCarthy began feeling rundown and tired. He had lost color in his face and was clearing his throat frequently. He also began experiencing bloody gums and nosebleeds. He sought medical help after he was too tired to go sailing over the Fourth of July weekend. Blood tests showed that McCarthy had a lack of platelets, and he was diagnosed with myelodysplastic syndrome, a condition that frequently develops into leukemia.

McCarthy continued to host his show for a short time, but he became more absent, until he left the air completely at the end of July. His plight became public, and soon bone marrow drives were held all over the Detroit area where thousands of people took tests in hope that their bone marrow would help McCarthy recover. In August, McCarthy flew to New York City where he was supposed to meet with doctors at the Sloan-Kettering Cancer Center, but his illness had become so severe that he was admitted.

J.P. McCarthy died of pneumonia in his sleep on the afternoon of August 16, 1995, with his entire family at his bedside. He was 62.

== The end ==
Grief swept his fans in the Detroit area; McCarthy's remains were flown back to Detroit and the Detroit media gave the story extensive coverage. Two days after McCarthy's death, most radio stations in Detroit and Windsor, Ontario observed a simultaneous one minute of silence as a tribute to the local legend. His funeral was held with more than a thousand mourners in attendance at St. Hugo of the Hills Catholic Church in Bloomfield Hills. McCarthy was buried on August 19 at White Chapel Memorial Cemetery in Troy, Michigan.
