= Benjamin Lee Whorf =

American linguist (1897–1941)

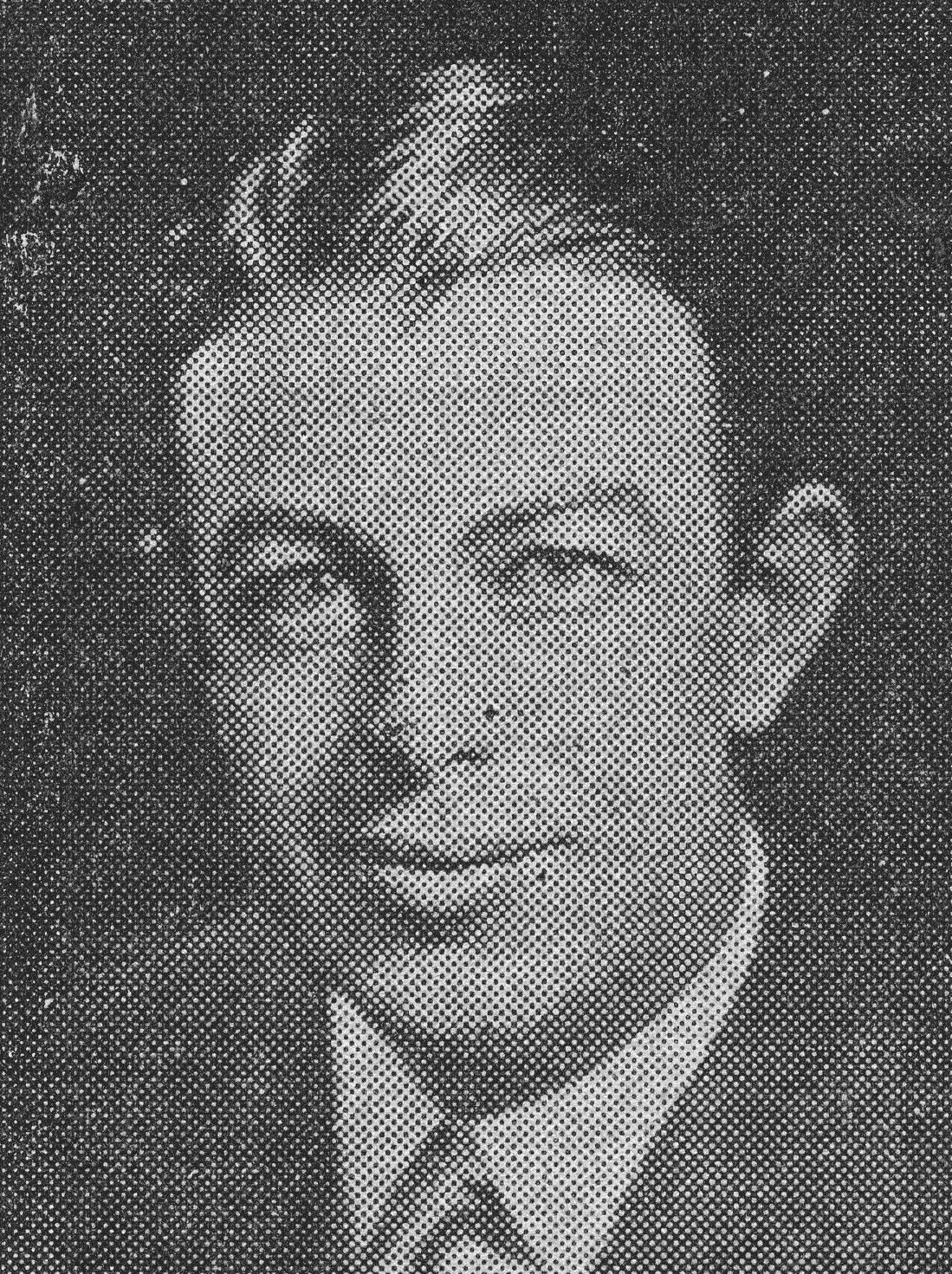
- Whorf, c. 1936
- Born: April 24, 1897; Winthrop, Massachusetts, US
- Died: July 26, 1941 (aged 44); Hartford, Connecticut, US
- Education: Massachusetts Institute of Technology
- Known for: Sapir–Whorf hypothesis (Linguistic relativity), Nahuatl linguistics, allophone, cryptotype, Maya script
- Spouse: Celia Inez Peckham (m. 1920)
- Children: 3
- Relatives: John, Richard, Mike Whorf
- Scientific career
- Fields: linguistics, anthropology, fire prevention
- Workplaces: Hartford Fire Insurance Company, Yale University

Benjamin Atwood Lee Whorf (/hwɔːrf/; April 24, 1897 – July 26, 1941) was an American linguist and fire prevention engineer best known for his advocacy of linguistic relativity. He believed that the structures of different languages shape how their speakers perceive and conceptualize the world. Whorf saw this idea, with influence from his mentor Edward Sapir, as having implications similar to those of Einstein's principle of physical relativity. However, the concept originated from 19th-century philosophy and thinkers like Wilhelm von Humboldt and Wilhelm Wundt.

Whorf initially pursued chemical engineering but developed an interest in linguistics, particularly Biblical Hebrew and indigenous Mesoamerican languages. His groundbreaking work on the Nahuatl language earned him recognition, and he received a grant to study it further in Mexico. He presented influential papers on Nahuatl upon his return. Whorf later studied linguistics with Edward Sapir at Yale University while working as a fire prevention engineer.

During his time at Yale, Whorf worked on describing the Hopi language and made notable claims about its perception of time. He also conducted research on the Uto-Aztecan languages, publishing influential papers. In 1938, he substituted for Sapir, teaching a seminar on American Indian linguistics. Whorf's contributions extended beyond linguistic relativity; he wrote a grammar sketch of Hopi, studied Nahuatl dialects, proposed a deciphering of Maya hieroglyphic writing, and contributed to Uto-Aztecan reconstruction.

After Whorf's premature death from cancer in 1941, his colleagues curated his manuscripts and promoted his ideas regarding language, culture, and cognition. However, in the 1960s, his views fell out of favor due to criticisms claiming his ideas were untestable and poorly formulated. In recent decades, interest in Whorf's work has resurged, with scholars reevaluating his ideas and engaging in a more in-depth understanding of his theories. The field of linguistic relativity remains an active area of research in psycholinguistics and linguistic anthropology, generating ongoing debates between relativism and universalism, as well as in the study of raciolinguistics. Whorf's contributions to linguistics, such as the allophone and the cryptotype, have been widely accepted.

== Biography ==
=== Early life ===
The son of Harry Church Whorf and Sarah Edna Lee Whorf, Benjamin Atwood Lee Whorf was born on April 24, 1897, in Winthrop, Massachusetts. His father was an artist, intellectual, and designer – first working as a commercial artist and later as a dramatist. Whorf had two younger brothers, John and Richard, who both went on to become notable artists. John became an internationally renowned painter and illustrator; Richard was an actor in films such as Yankee Doodle Dandy and later an Emmy-nominated television director of such shows as The Beverly Hillbillies. Whorf was the intellectual of the three and started conducting chemical experiments with his father's photographic equipment at a young age. He was also an avid reader, interested in botany, astrology, and Middle American prehistory. He read William H. Prescott's Conquest of Mexico several times. At the age of 17, he began keeping a copious diary in which he recorded his thoughts and dreams.

=== Career in fire prevention ===
In 1918, Whorf graduated from the Massachusetts Institute of Technology, where his academic performance was of average quality, with a degree in chemical engineering. In 1920, he married Celia Inez Peckham; they had three children, Raymond Ben, Robert Peckham and Celia Lee. Around the same time he began work as a fire prevention engineer (an inspector) for the Hartford Fire Insurance Company. He was particularly good at the job and was highly commended by his employers. His job required him to travel to production facilities throughout New England to be inspected. One anecdote describes him arriving at a chemical plant and being denied access by the director, who would not allow anyone to see the production procedure, which was a trade secret. Having been told what the plant produced, Whorf wrote a chemical formula on a piece of paper, saying to the director: "I think this is what you're doing". The surprised director asked Whorf how he knew about the secret procedure, and he simply answered: "You couldn't do it in any other way."

Whorf helped to attract new customers to the Fire Insurance Company; they favored his thorough inspections and recommendations. Another famous anecdote from his job was used by Whorf to argue that language use affects habitual behavior. Whorf described a workplace in which full gasoline drums were stored in one room and empty ones in another; he said that because of flammable vapor the "empty" drums were more dangerous than those that were full, although workers handled them less carefully to the point that they smoked in the room with "empty" drums, but not in the room with full ones. Whorf argued that by habitually speaking of the vapor-filled drums as empty and by extension as inert, the workers were oblivious to the risk posed by smoking near the "empty drums". (Note: The Relation of Habitual Thought And Behavior to Language. Written in 1939 and originally published in "Language, Culture and Personality: Essays in Memory of Edward Sapir" edited by Leslie Spier, 1941, reprinted in Carroll (1956:134–59). The piece is the source of most of the quotes used by Whorf's detractors.)

=== Early interest in religion and language ===
Whorf was a spiritual man throughout his lifetime, although what religion he followed has been the subject of debate. As a young man, he produced a manuscript titled "Why I have discarded evolution", causing some scholars to describe him as a devout Methodist, who was impressed with fundamentalism, and perhaps supportive of creationism. However, throughout his life Whorf's main religious interest was Theosophy, a nonsectarian organization based on Buddhist and Hindu teachings that promotes the view of the world as an interconnected whole and the unity and brotherhood of humankind "without distinction of race, creed, sex, caste or color". Some scholars have argued that the conflict between spiritual and scientific inclinations has been a driving force in Whorf's intellectual development, particularly in the attraction by ideas of linguistic relativity. Whorf said that "of all groups of people with whom I have come in contact, Theosophical people seem the most capable of becoming excited about ideas—new ideas."

Around 1924, Whorf first became interested in linguistics. Originally, he analyzed Biblical texts, seeking to uncover hidden layers of meaning. Inspired by the esoteric work La langue hebraïque restituée by Antoine Fabre d'Olivet, he began a semantic and grammatical analysis of Biblical Hebrew. Whorf's early manuscripts on Hebrew and Maya have been described as exhibiting a considerable degree of mysticism, as he sought to uncover esoteric meanings of glyphs and letters.

=== Early studies in Mesoamerican linguistics ===
Whorf studied Biblical linguistics mainly at the Watkinson Library (now Hartford Public Library). This library had an extensive collection of materials about Native American linguistics and folklore, originally collected by James Hammond Trumbull. It was at the Watkinson library that Whorf became friends with a young boy, John B. Carroll, who later went on to study psychology under B. F. Skinner, and who in 1956 edited and published a selection of Whorf's essays as Language, Thought and Reality Carroll (1956b). The collection rekindled Whorf's interest in Mesoamerican antiquity. He began studying the Nahuatl language in 1925, and later, beginning in 1928, he studied the collections of Maya hieroglyphic texts. Quickly becoming conversant with the materials, he began a scholarly dialog with Mesoamericanists such as Alfred Tozzer, the Maya archaeologist at Harvard University, and Herbert Spinden of the Brooklyn Museum.

In 1928, he first presented a paper at the International Congress of Americanists in which he presented his translation of a Nahuatl document held at the Peabody Museum at Harvard. He also began to study the comparative linguistics of the Uto-Aztecan language family, which Edward Sapir had recently demonstrated to be a linguistic family. In addition to Nahuatl, Whorf studied the Piman and Tepecano languages, while in close correspondence with linguist J. Alden Mason.

=== Field studies in Mexico ===
Because of the promise shown by his work on Uto-Aztecan, Tozzer and Spinden advised Whorf to apply for a grant with the Social Science Research Council (SSRC) to support his research. Whorf considered using the money to travel to Mexico to procure Aztec manuscripts for the Watkinson library, but Tozzer suggested he spend the time in Mexico documenting modern Nahuatl dialects. In his application Whorf proposed to establish the oligosynthetic nature of the Nahuatl language. Before leaving Whorf presented the paper "Stem series in Maya" at the Linguistic Society of America conference, in which he argued that in the Mayan languages syllables carry symbolic content. The SSRC awarded Whorf the grant and in 1930 he traveled to Mexico City, where Professor Robert H. Barlow put him in contact with several speakers of Nahuatl to serve as his informants. The outcome of the trip to Mexico was Whorf's sketch of Milpa Alta Nahuatl, published only after his death, and an article on a series of Aztec pictograms found at the Tepozteco monument at Tepoztlán, Morelos in which he noted similarities in form and meaning between Aztec and Maya day signs.

=== At Yale ===
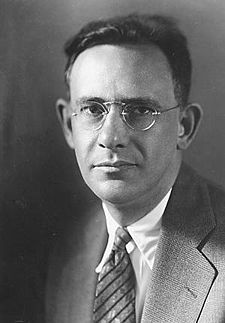
Edward Sapir, Whorf's mentor in linguistics at Yale

Although Whorf had been entirely an autodidact in linguistic theory and field methodology up to this point, he had already made a name for himself in Mesoamerican linguistics. Whorf had met Sapir, the leading US linguist of the day, at professional conferences, and in 1931 Sapir came to Yale from the University of Chicago to take a position as Professor of Anthropology. Alfred Tozzer sent Sapir a copy of Whorf's paper on "Nahuatl tones and saltillo". Sapir replied stating that it "should by all means be published"; however, it was not until 1993 that it was prepared for publication by Lyle Campbell and Frances Karttunen.

Whorf took Sapir's first course at Yale on "American Indian Linguistics". He enrolled in a program of graduate studies, nominally working towards a PhD in linguistics, but he never actually attempted to obtain a degree, satisfying himself with participating in the intellectual community around Sapir. At Yale, Whorf joined the circle of Sapir's students that included such luminaries as Morris Swadesh, Mary Haas, Harry Hoijer, G. L. Trager and Charles F. Voegelin. Whorf took on a central role among Sapir's students and was well respected.

Sapir had a profound influence on Whorf's thinking. Sapir's earliest writings had espoused views of the relation between thought and language stemming from the Humboldtian tradition he acquired through Franz Boas, which regarded language as the historical embodiment of volksgeist, or ethnic world view. But Sapir had since become influenced by a current of logical positivism, such as that of Bertrand Russell and the early Ludwig Wittgenstein, particularly through Ogden and Richards' The Meaning of Meaning, from which he adopted the view that natural language potentially obscures, rather than facilitates, the mind to perceive and describe the world as it really is. In this view, proper perception could only be accomplished through formal logics. During his stay at Yale, Whorf acquired this current of thought partly from Sapir and partly through his own readings of Russell and of Ogden and Richards. As Whorf became more influenced by positivist science, he also distanced himself from some approaches to language and meaning that he saw as lacking in rigor and insight. One of these was Polish philosopher Alfred Korzybski's General semantics, which was espoused in the US by Stuart Chase. Chase admired Whorf's work and frequently sought out a reluctant Whorf, who considered Chase to be "utterly incompetent by training and background to handle such a subject." Ironically, Chase would later write the foreword for Carroll's collection of Whorf's writings.

==== Work on Hopi and descriptive linguistics ====
Sapir also encouraged Whorf to continue his work on the historical and descriptive linguistics of Uto-Aztecan. Whorf published several articles on that topic in this period, some of them with G. L. Trager, who had become his close friend. Whorf took a special interest in the Hopi language and started working with Ernest Naquayouma, a speaker of Hopi from Toreva village living in Manhattan, New York. Whorf credited Naquayouma as the source of most of his information on the Hopi language, although in 1938 he took a short field trip to the village of Mishongnovi, on the Second Mesa of the Hopi Reservation in Arizona.

In 1936, Whorf was appointed honorary research fellow in anthropology at Yale, and he was invited by Franz Boas to serve on the committee of the Society of American Linguistics (later Linguistic Society of America). In 1937, Yale awarded him the Sterling Fellowship. He was a lecturer in anthropology from 1937 through 1938, replacing Sapir, who was gravely ill. Whorf gave graduate level lectures on "Problems of American Indian Linguistics". In 1938 with Trager's assistance he elaborated a report on the progress of linguistic research at the department of anthropology at Yale. The report includes some of Whorf's influential contributions to linguistic theory, such as the concept of the allophone and of covert grammatical categories. Lee (1996) has argued, that in this report Whorf's linguistic theories exist in a condensed form, and that it was mainly through this report that Whorf exerted influence on the discipline of descriptive linguistics. (Note: The report is reprinted in Lee (1996))

==== Final years ====
In late 1938, Whorf's own health declined. After an operation for cancer, he fell into an unproductive period. He was also deeply affected by Sapir's death in early 1939. It was in the writings of his last two years that he laid out the research program of linguistic relativity. His 1939 memorial article for Sapir, "The Relation of Habitual Thought And Behavior to Language", in particular has been taken to be Whorf's definitive statement of the issue, and is his most frequently quoted piece.

In his last year Whorf also published three articles in the MIT Technology Review titled "Science and Linguistics", (Note: "Science and linguistics" first published in 1940 in MIT Technology Review (42:229–31); reprinted in Carroll (1956:212–214)) "Linguistics as an Exact Science" and "Language and Logic". He was also invited to contribute an article to a theosophical journal, Theosophist, published in Madras, India, for which he wrote "Language, Mind and Reality". (Note: Language Mind and reality. Written in 1941 originally printed by the Theosophical Society in 1942 "The Theosophist" Madras, India. Vol 63:1. 281–91. Reprinted in Carroll (1956:246–270). In 1952 also reprinted in "Etc.: A Review of General Semantics, 9:167–188.) In these final pieces, he offered a critique of Western science in which he suggested that non-European languages often referred to physical phenomena in ways that more directly reflected aspects of reality than many European languages, and that science ought to pay attention to the effects of linguistic categorization in its efforts to describe the physical world. He particularly criticized the Indo-European languages for promoting a mistaken essentialist world view, which had been disproved by advances in the science, in contrast suggesting that other languages dedicated more attention to processes and dynamics rather than stable essences. Whorf argued that paying attention to how other physical phenomena are described across languages could make valuable contributions to science by pointing out the ways in which certain assumptions about reality are implicit in the structure of language itself, and how language guides the attention of speakers towards certain phenomena in the world; these phenomena risk becoming overemphasized while leaving other phenomena at risk of being overlooked.

== Posthumous reception and legacy ==
At Whorf's death, his friend G. L. Trager was appointed as curator of his unpublished manuscripts. Some of them were published in the years after his death by another of Whorf's friends, Harry Hoijer. In the decade following, Trager and particularly Hoijer did much to popularize Whorf's ideas about linguistic relativity, and it was Hoijer who coined the term "Sapir–Whorf hypothesis" at a 1954 conference. Trager then published an article titled "The systematization of the Whorf hypothesis", which contributed to the idea that Whorf had proposed a hypothesis that should be the basis for a program of empirical research. Hoijer also published studies of Indigenous languages and cultures of the American South West in which Whorf found correspondences between cultural patterns and linguistic ones. The term, even though technically a misnomer, went on to become the most widely known label for Whorf's ideas. According to John A. Lucy, "Whorf's work in linguistics was and still is recognized as being of superb professional quality by linguists".

=== Universalism and anti-Whorfianism ===
Whorf's work began to fall out of favor less than a decade after his death, and he was subjected to severe criticism from scholars of language, culture and psychology. In 1953 and 1954, psychologists Roger Brown and Eric Lenneberg criticized Whorf for his reliance on anecdotal evidence, formulating a hypothesis to scientifically test his ideas, which they limited to an examination of a causal relation between grammatical or lexical structure and cognition or perception. Whorf himself did not advocate a straight causality between language and thought; instead he wrote that "Language and culture had grown up together"; that both were mutually shaped by the other. Hence, Lucy (1992a) has argued that because the aim of the formulation of the Sapir–Whorf hypothesis was to test simple causation, it failed to test Whorf's ideas from the outset.

Focusing on color terminology, with easily discernible differences between perception and vocabulary, Brown and Lenneberg published in 1954 a study of Zuni color terms that slightly support a weak effect of semantic categorization of color terms on color perception. In doing so they began a line of empirical studies that investigated the principle of linguistic relativity. (Note: For more on this topic see: Linguistic relativity and the color naming debate)

Empirical testing of the Whorfian hypothesis declined in the 1960s to 1980s as Noam Chomsky began to redefine linguistics and much of psychology in formal universalist terms. Several studies from that period refuted Whorf's hypothesis, demonstrating that linguistic diversity is a surface veneer that masks underlying universal cognitive principles. Many studies were highly critical and disparaging in their language, ridiculing Whorf's analyses and examples or his lack of an academic degree. (Note: See for example pages 623, 624, 631 in Malotki (1983), which is mild in comparison to later writings by Pinker (1994), Pinker (2007), and McWhorter (2009)) Throughout the 1980s, most mentions of Whorf or of the Sapir–Whorf hypotheses continued to be disparaging, and led to a widespread view that Whorf's ideas had been proven wrong. Because Whorf was treated so severely in the scholarship during those decades, he has been described as "one of the prime whipping boys of introductory texts to linguistics". With the advent of cognitive linguistics and psycholinguistics in the late 1980s, some linguists sought to rehabilitate Whorf's reputation, as scholarship began to question whether earlier critiques of Whorf were justified.

By the 1960s, analytical philosophers also became aware of the Sapir–Whorf hypothesis, and philosophers such as Max Black and Donald Davidson published scathing critiques of Whorf's strong relativist viewpoints. Black characterized Whorf's ideas about metaphysics as demonstrating "amateurish crudity". According to Black and Davidson, Whorf's viewpoint and the concept of linguistic relativity meant that translation between languages with different conceptual schemes would be impossible. (Note: Leavitt (2011) notes how Davidson cites an essay by Whorf as claiming that English and Hopi ideas of times cannot 'be calibrated'. But the word "calibrate" does not appear in the essay cited by Davidson, and in the essay where Whorf does use the word he explicitly states that the two conceptualizations can be calibrated. For Leavitt this is characteristic of the way Whorf has been consistently misread, others such as Lee (1996), Alford (1978) and Casasanto (2008) make similar points.) Recent assessments such as those by Leavitt and Lee, however, consider Black and Davidson's interpretation to be based on an inaccurate characterization of Whorf's viewpoint, and even rather absurd given the time he spent trying to translate between different conceptual schemes. In their view, the critiques are based on a lack of familiarity with Whorf's writings; according to these recent Whorf scholars a more accurate description of his viewpoint is that he thought translation to be possible, but only through careful attention to the subtle differences between conceptual schemes.

Eric Lenneberg, Noam Chomsky, and Steven Pinker have also criticized Whorf for failing to be sufficiently clear in his formulation of how language influences thought, and for failing to provide real evidence to support his assumptions. Generally Whorf's arguments took the form of examples that were anecdotal or speculative, and functioned as attempts to show how "exotic" grammatical traits were connected to what were considered equally exotic worlds of thought. Even Whorf's defenders admitted that his writing style was often convoluted and couched in neologisms – attributed to his awareness of language use, and his reluctance to use terminology that might have pre-existing connotations. McWhorter (2009:156) argues that Whorf was mesmerized by the foreignness of indigenous languages, and exaggerated and idealized them. According to Lakoff, Whorf's tendency to exoticize data must be judged in the historical context: Whorf and the other Boasians wrote at a time in which racism and jingoism were predominant, and when it was unthinkable to many that "savages" had redeeming qualities, or that their languages were comparable in complexity to those of Europe. For this alone Lakoff argues, Whorf can be considered to be "[n]ot just a pioneer in linguistics, but a pioneer as a human being".

Today, many followers of universalist schools of thought continue to oppose the idea of linguistic relativity, seeing it as unsound or even ridiculous. For example, Steven Pinker argues in his book The Language Instinct that thought exists prior to language and independently of it, a view also espoused by philosophers of language such as Jerry Fodor, John Locke and Plato. In this interpretation, language is inconsequential to human thought because humans do not think in "natural" language, i.e. any language used for communication. Rather, we think in a meta-language that precedes natural language, which Pinker following Fodor calls "mentalese." Pinker attacks what he calls "Whorf's radical position", declaring, "the more you examine Whorf's arguments, the less sense they make." Scholars of a more "relativist" bent such as John A. Lucy and Stephen C. Levinson have criticized Pinker for misrepresenting Whorf's views and arguing against strawmen. (Note: See also Nick Yee's evaluation of Pinker's criticism, What Whorf Really Said, and Dan "Moonhawk" Alford's rebuttal of Chomsky's critique at Chomsky's Rebuttal of Whorf: The Annotated Version by Moonhawk, 8/95 and The Great Whorf Hypothesis Hoax by Dan Moonhawk Alford.)

=== Corroboration of Whorf's claims ===
The idea that Whorf defended a kind of "linguistic relativity" stems from his article "Language, Mind and Reality" published during the Second World War, where Whorf criticized American scientists, especially some physicists who were searching for a substance where there are only substantive words such as energy and searching for an expenditure of energy where there are only transitive verbs such as transform, thus trying to disprove Einstein's Theory of Relativity, which helps us predict how much mass must be consumed to produce how much energy. Whorf claimed in this article that this "Aryan Western Logic" coming from "Western Languages" was stopping scientists to accept the theory and spend efforts on its applications, such as the creation of the atomic bomb, which could be decisive for the United States to win or lose the war against the Germans. This is a period when some national socialists in Germany were trying to develop an Aryan Physics, free from counterintuitive findings by Jewish physicists such as Albert Einstein.

Studies on the construction of experience through meaning have been increasing since the 1990s, and a series of experimental results have corroborated Whorf's claims, when understood as he presented them, especially in cultural psychology and linguistic anthropology. One of the earliest linguistic descriptions directing positive attention towards Whorf's claims that grammatical categories construed meaning was George Lakoff's "Women, Fire and Dangerous Things", in which he argued that Whorf had been on the right track when he claimed that a contrast in grammatical categories is a resource for a contrast in experiencial meaning, thus that the way we usually represent our experience (including through grammatical categories) impacts the way our senses are organised as experience. In 1992 psychologist John A. Lucy published two books on the topic: the first one analyzed the intellectual genealogy of the hypothesis, arguing that previous studies had failed to appreciate the subtleties of Whorf's thinking; they had been unable to formulate a research agenda that would actually test Whorf's claims. Lucy proposed a new research design so that the hypothesis of linguistic relativity could be tested empirically, and to avoid the pitfalls of earlier studies which Lucy claimed had tended to presuppose the universality of the categories they were studying. His second book was an empirical study of the relation between grammatical categories and cognition in the Yucatec Maya language of Mexico.

In 1996 Penny Lee's reappraisal of Whorf's writings was published, reinstating Whorf as a serious and capable thinker. Lee argued that previous explorations of the Sapir–Whorf hypothesis had largely ignored Whorf's actual writings, and consequently asked questions very unlike those Whorf had asked. Also in that year a volume, "Rethinking Linguistic Relativity" edited by John J. Gumperz and Stephen C. Levinson gathered a range of researchers working in psycholinguistics, sociolinguistics and linguistic anthropology to bring renewed attention to the issue of how Whorf's theories could be updated, and a subsequent review of the new direction of the linguistic relativity paradigm cemented the development. Since then considerable empirical research into linguistic relativity has been carried out, especially at the Max Planck Institute for Psycholinguistics with scholarship motivating two edited volumes of linguistic relativity studies, and in American Institutions by scholars such as Lera Boroditsky and Dedre Gentner.

In turn universalist scholars frequently dismiss Whorf's claims as "dull" or "boring", as well as positive findings of influence of grammatical categories on thought or behavior, which are often subtle rather than spectacular. (Note: McWhorter misquotes Paul Kay and Willett Kempton's 1984 article "What is the Sapir-Whorf Hypothesis" (Kay & Kempton (1984)), in which they criticize those of Whorf's interpreters who are only willing to accept spectacular differences in cognition. McWhorter attributes the view to Kay and Kempton that they were in fact criticizing.) Despite the fact that scientists were trying to find substances and loss of energy in the transformation of mass into energy and that Whorf was correct in his critique against such lines of research, these researchers do not mention the context in which Whorf wrote his critique of scientists and claim that Whorf's supposed "linguistic relativity" had promised more spectacular findings than it was able to provide.

Whorf's views have been compared to those of philosophers such as Friedrich Nietzsche and the late Ludwig Wittgenstein, both of whom considered language to have important bearing on thought and reasoning. His hypotheses have also been compared to the views of psychologists such as Lev Vygotsky, whose social constructivism considers the cognitive development of children to be mediated by the social use of language. Vygotsky shared Whorf's interest in gestalt psychology, and he also read Sapir's works. Others have seen similarities between Whorf's work and the ideas of literary theorist Mikhail Bakhtin, who read Whorf and whose approach to textual meaning was similarly holistic and relativistic. Whorf's ideas have also been interpreted as a radical critique of positivist science.

== Work ==
=== Linguistic relativity ===
Whorf is best known as the main proponent of what he called the principle of linguistic relativity, but which is often known as "the Sapir–Whorf hypothesis", named for him and Edward Sapir. Whorf never stated the principle in the form of a hypothesis, and the idea that linguistic categories influence perception and cognition was shared by many other scholars before him. But because Whorf, in his articles, gave specific examples of how he saw the grammatical categories of specific languages related to conceptual and behavioral patterns, he pointed towards an empirical research program that has been taken up by subsequent scholars, and which is often called "Sapir–Whorf studies".

==== Sources of influence on Whorf's thinking ====
Whorf's illustration of the difference between the English and Shawnee gestalt construction of cleaning a gun with a ramrod. From the article "Language and Science", originally published in the MIT technology Review, 1940. Image copyright of MIT Press.

Whorf and Sapir both drew explicitly on Albert Einstein's principle of general relativity; hence linguistic relativity refers to the concept of grammatical and semantic categories of a specific language providing a frame of reference as a medium through which observations are made. Following an original observation by Boas, Sapir demonstrated that speakers of a given language perceive sounds that are acoustically different as the same, if the sound comes from the underlying phoneme and does not contribute to changes in semantic meaning. Furthermore, speakers of languages are attentive to sounds, particularly if the same two sounds come from different phonemes. Such differentiation is an example of how various observational frames of reference leads to different patterns of attention and perception.

Whorf was also influenced by gestalt psychology, believing that languages require their speakers to describe the same events as different gestalt constructions, which he called "isolates from experience". An example is how the action of cleaning a gun is different in English and Shawnee: English focuses on the instrumental relation between two objects and the purpose of the action (removing dirt); whereas the Shawnee language focuses on the movement—using an arm to create a dry space in a hole. The event described is the same, but the attention in terms of figure and ground are different.

==== Degree of influence of language on thought ====
If read superficially, some of Whorf's statements lend themselves to the interpretation that he supported linguistic determinism. For example, in an often-quoted passage Whorf writes:

We dissect nature along lines laid down by our native language. The categories and types that we isolate from the world of phenomena we do not find there because they stare every observer in the face; on the contrary, the world is presented in a kaleidoscope flux of impressions which has to be organized by our minds—and this means largely by the linguistic systems of our minds. We cut nature up, organize it into concepts, and ascribe significances as we do, largely because we are parties to an agreement to organize it in this way—an agreement that holds throughout our speech community and is codified in the patterns of our language. The agreement is of course, an implicit and unstated one, but its terms are absolutely obligatory; we cannot talk at all except by subscribing to the organization and classification of data that the agreement decrees. We are thus introduced to a new principle of relativity, which holds that all observers are not led by the same physical evidence to the same picture of the universe, unless their linguistic backgrounds are similar, or can in some way be calibrated.

The statements about the obligatory nature of the terms of language have been taken to suggest that Whorf meant that language completely determined the scope of possible conceptualizations. However, neo-Whorfians argue that here Whorf is writing about the terms in which we speak of the world, not the terms in which we think of it. Whorf noted that to communicate thoughts and experiences with members of a speech community speakers must use the linguistic categories of their shared language, which requires moulding experiences into the shape of language to speak them—a process called "thinking for speaking". This interpretation is supported by Whorf's subsequent statement that "No individual is free to describe nature with absolute impartiality, but is constrained by certain modes of interpretation even when he thinks himself most free". Similarly, the statement that observers are led to different pictures of the universe has been understood as an argument that different conceptualizations are not comparable, making translation between different conceptual and linguistic systems impossible. Neo-Whorfians argue this to be a misreading since throughout his work one of his main points was that such systems could be "calibrated" and thereby be made commensurable, but only when we become aware of the differences in conceptual schemes through linguistic analysis.

==== Hopi time ====
Whorf's study of Hopi time has been the most widely discussed and criticized example of linguistic relativity. In his analysis he argues that there is a relation between how the Hopi people conceptualize time, how they speak of temporal relations, and the grammar of the Hopi language. Whorf's most elaborate argument for the existence of linguistic relativity was based on what he saw as a fundamental difference in the understanding of time as a conceptual category among the Hopi. He argued that the Hopi language, in contrast to English and other SAE languages, does not treat the flow of time as a sequence of distinct countable instances, like "three days" or "five years", but rather as a single process. Because of this difference, the language lacks nouns that refer to units of time. He proposed that the Hopi view of time was fundamental in all aspects of their culture and furthermore explained certain patterns of behavior. In his 1939 memorial essay to Sapir he wrote that "... the Hopi language is seen to contain no words, grammatical forms, construction or expressions that refer directly to what we call 'time', or to past, present, or future..."

Linguist Ekkehart Malotki challenged Whorf's analyses of Hopi temporal expressions and concepts with numerous examples how the Hopi language refers to time. Malotki argues that in the Hopi language the system of tenses consists of future and non-future and that the single difference between the three-tense system of European languages and the Hopi system, is that the latter combines past and present to form a single category. (Note: It is not uncommon for non-Indo-European languages not to have a three way tense distinction, but instead to distinguish between realis (past/present) and irrealis (future) moods, and describe the past distinction using completive aspect. This, for example, is the case in Greenlandic. But this had not been recognized when Whorf wrote. See Bernard Comrie's Comrie (1984) review of Malotki in which he argues that many of Malotki's examples of a tense distinction in fact rather suggest a modality distinction.)

Critics of Whorf frequently refer to Malotki's data, which would appear to contradict Whorf's statements on Hopi, in order to refute his concept of linguistic relativity; while other scholars have defended the analysis of Hopi, arguing that Whorf's claim was not that Hopi lacked words or categories to describe temporality, but that the Hopi concept of time is altogether different from that of English speakers. Whorf described the Hopi categories of tense, noting that time is not divided into past, present and future, as is common in European languages, but rather a single tense refers to both present and past while another refers to events that have not yet happened and may or may not happen in the future. He also described a large array of stems that he called "tensors" which describes aspects of temporality, but without referring to countable units of time as in English and most European languages.

=== Contributions to linguistic theory ===
Whorf's distinction between "overt" (phenotypical) and "covert" (cryptotypical) grammatical categories has become widely influential in linguistics and anthropology. British linguist Michael Halliday wrote about Whorf's notion of the "cryptotype", and the conception of "how grammar models reality", that it would "eventually turn out to be among the major contributions of twentieth century linguistics".

Furthermore, Whorf introduced the concept of allophones, which are positional phonetic variants of a single superordinate phoneme; in doing so he placed a cornerstone in consolidating early phoneme theory. The term was popularized by G. L. Trager and Bernard Bloch in a 1941 paper on English phonology and went on to become part of standard usage within the American structuralist tradition. Whorf considered allophones to be another example of linguistic relativity. The principle of allophony describes how acoustically different sounds can be treated as reflections of a single phoneme in a language. This sometimes makes the different sound appear similar to native speakers of the language, even to the point that they are unable to distinguish them auditorily without special training. Whorf wrote that: "[allophones] are also relativistic. Objectively, acoustically, and physiologically the allophones of [a] phoneme may be extremely unlike, hence the impossibility of determining what is what. You always have to keep the observer in the picture. What linguistic pattern makes like is like, and what it makes unlike is unlike".(Whorf, 1940) (Note: Unpublished paper quoted in Lee (2000:50))

Central to Whorf's inquiries was the approach later described as metalinguistics by G. L. Trager, who in 1950 published four of Whorf's essays as "Four articles on Metalinguistics". (Note: "Four articles on Metalinguistics" 1950. Foreign Service Institute, Dept. of State) Whorf was crucially interested in the ways in which speakers come to be aware of the language that they use, and become able to describe and analyze language using language itself to do so. Whorf saw that the ability to arrive at progressively more accurate descriptions of the world hinged partly on the ability to construct a metalanguage to describe how language affects experience, and thus to have the ability to calibrate different conceptual schemes. Whorf's endeavors have since been taken up in the development of the study of metalinguistics and metalinguistic awareness, first by Michael Silverstein who published a radical and influential rereading of Whorf in 1979 and subsequently in the field of linguistic anthropology.

=== Studies of Uto-Aztecan languages ===
Whorf conducted important work on the Uto-Aztecan languages, which Sapir had conclusively demonstrated as a valid language family in 1915. Working first on Nahuatl, Tepecano, and Tohono O'odham, he had established familiarity with the language group before he met Sapir in 1928. During Whorf's time at Yale, he published several articles on Uto-Aztecan linguistics, such as "Notes on the Tübatulabal language". (Note: Notes on the Tubatulabal Language. 1936. American Anthropologist 38: 341–44.) In 1935 he published "The Comparative Linguistics of Uto-Aztecan", (Note: "The Comparative Linguistics of Uto-Aztecan." 1935. American Anthropologist 37:600–608.) and a review of Kroeber's survey of Uto-Aztecan linguistics. (Note: "review of: Uto-Aztecan Languages of Mexico. A. L. Kroeber" American Anthropologist, New Series, Vol. 37, No. 2, Part 1 (Apr. – Jun. 1935), pp. 343–345) Whorf's work served to further cement the foundations of comparative Uto-Aztecan studies.

The first Native American language Whorf studied was the Uto-Aztecan language Nahuatl, which he first studied from colonial grammars and documents; later, it became the subject of his first field work experience in 1930. Based on his studies of Classical Nahuatl, Whorf argued that Nahuatl was an oligosynthetic language, a typological category that he invented. In Mexico working with native speakers, he studied the dialects of Milpa Alta and Tepoztlán. His grammar sketch of the Milpa Alta dialect of Nahuatl was not published during his lifetime, but it was published posthumously by Harry Hoijer (Note: The Milpa Alta dialect of Aztec (with notes on the Classical and the Tepoztlan dialects). Written in 1939, first published in 1946 by Harry Hoijer in Linguistic Structures of Native America, pp. 367–97. Viking Fund Publications in Anthropology, no. 6. New York: Viking Fund.) and became quite influential and used as the basic description of "Modern Nahuatl" by many scholars. The description of the dialect is quite condensed and in some places difficult to understand because of Whorf's propensity of inventing his own unique terminology for grammatical concepts, but the work has generally been considered to be technically advanced. He also produced an analysis of the prosody of these dialects which he related to the history of the glottal stop and vowel length in Nahuan languages. This work was prepared for publication by Lyle Campbell and Frances Karttunen in 1993, who also considered it a valuable description of the two endangered dialects, and the only one of its kind to include detailed phonetic analysis of supra-segmental phenomena.

In Uto-Aztecan linguistics, one of Whorf's achievements was to determine the reason the Nahuatl language has the phoneme /tɬ/, not found in the other languages of the family. The existence of /tɬ/ in Nahuatl had puzzled previous linguists and caused Sapir to reconstruct a /tɬ/ phoneme for proto-Uto-Aztecan based only on evidence from Aztecan. In a 1937 paper published in the journal American Anthropologist, Whorf argued that the phoneme resulted from some of the Nahuan or Aztecan languages having undergone a sound change from the original */t/ to [tɬ] in the position before */a/. This sound law is known as "Whorf's law", considered valid although a more detailed understanding of the precise conditions under which it took place has since been developed.

Also in 1937, Whorf and his friend G. L. Trager published a paper in which they elaborated on the Azteco-Tanoan (Note: Whorf and Trager suggested the term "Azteco-Tanoan" instead of the label "Aztec-Tanoan" used by Sapir. However, Sapir's original use has stood the test of time.) language family, proposed originally by Sapir as a family comprising the Uto-Aztecan and the Kiowa-Tanoan languages—(the Tewa and Kiowa languages). (Note: with George L.Trager. The relationship of Uto-Aztecan and Tanoan. (1937). American Anthropologist, 39:609–624.)

=== Maya epigraphy ===
In a series of published and unpublished studies in the 1930s, Whorf argued that Mayan writing was to some extent phonetic. While his work on deciphering the Maya script gained some support from Alfred Tozzer at Harvard, the main authority on Ancient Maya culture at the time, J. E. S. Thompson, strongly rejected Whorf's ideas, saying that Mayan writing lacked a phonetic component and is therefore impossible to decipher based on a linguistic analysis. Whorf argued that it was exactly the reluctance to apply linguistic analysis of Maya languages that had held the decipherment back. Whorf sought for cues to phonetic values within the elements of the specific signs, never realizing that the system was logo-syllabic. Although Whorf's approach to understanding the Maya script is now known to have been misguided, his central claim that the script was phonetic and should be deciphered as such was vindicated by Yuri Knorozov's syllabic decipherment of Mayan writing in the 1950s.

== Sources ==
- Alford, D. K. H. (1978). "The Demise of the Whorf Hypothesis (A Major Revision in the History of Linguistics)" (PDF). Annual Meeting of the Berkeley Linguistics Society. 4: 485. doi:10.3765/bls.v4i0.2227. Archived (PDF) from the original on October 9, 2022.
- Alford, D. K. H. (1981). "Is Whorf's Relativity Einstein's Relativity?". Annual Meeting of the Berkeley Linguistics Society. 7: 13–26. doi:10.3765/bls.v7i0.2077.
- Algeo, John (July–August 2001). "A Notable Theosophist: Benjamin Lee Whorf". Quest. 89 (4): 148–149.
- Bergman, J. (2011). "Benjamin Lee Whorf: An Early Supporter of Creationism". Acts & Facts. 40 (10): 12–14.
- Berlin, Brent; Kay, Paul (1969). Basic Color Terms: Their Universality and Evolution. University of California Press.
- Black, Max (1959). "Linguistic Relativity: The Views of Benjamin Lee Whorf". The Philosophical Review. 68 (2): 228–238. doi:10.2307/2182168. JSTOR 2182168.
- Boroditsky, Lera (2003). "Linguistic Relativity". Encyclopedia of Cognitive Science. Hoboken, NJ, USA: Wiley.
- Brown, R.; Lenneberg, E. (1954). "A study in language and cognition" (PDF). Journal of Abnormal and Social Psychology. 49 (3): 454–462. doi:10.1037/h0057814. PMID 13174309. Archived from the original (PDF) on September 22, 2017.
- Carroll, John B. (1956). "Introduction". Language, Thought, and Reality: Selected Writings of Benjamin Lee Whorf. Cambridge, Mass.: Technology Press of Massachusetts Institute of Technology. pp. 1–34. ISBN 978-0-262-73006-8.
- Carroll, John B. (1956b). Language, Thought, and Reality: Selected Writings of Benjamin Lee Whorf. Cambridge, Mass.: Technology Press of Massachusetts Institute of Technology. ISBN 978-0-262-73006-8.
- Carroll, John B. (2005). "Whorf, Benjamin Lee". Encyclopedia of Cognitive Science.
- Casasanto, Daniel (2008). "Who's Afraid of the Big Bad Whorf? Crosslinguistic Differences in Temporal Language and Thought". Language Learning. 58 (1): 79. doi:10.1111/j.1467-9922.2008.00462.x. hdl:11858/00-001M-0000-0014-6D70-1.
- Chapman, Siobhan; Routledge, Christopher, eds. (2005). Key Thinkers in Linguistics and the Philosophy of Language. USA: Oxford University Press. pp. 268–71. ISBN 978-0-19-518768-7.
- Chatterjee, Ranjit (1985). "Reading Whorf through Wittgenstein: A solution to the linguistic relativity problem". Lingua. 67 (1): 37–63. doi:10.1016/0024-3841(85)90012-9.
- Chomsky, Noam (1973). "Introduction". In Adam Schaff (ed.). Language and Cognition. McGraw-Hill Paperbacks.
- Comrie, Bernard (1984). "Review of Ekkehart Malotki, Hopi Time". Australian Journal of Linguistics. 4: 131–3.
- Coe, Michael D. (1992). Breaking the Maya Code. London: Thames & Hudson. ISBN 978-0-500-05061-3.
- Darnell, Regna (2001). Invisible Genealogies: A History of Americanist Anthropology. Critical studies in the history of anthropology series. Vol. 1. Lincoln: University of Nebraska Press. ISBN 978-0-8032-1710-2. OCLC 44502297.
- Darnell, Regna (1990). Edward Sapir: linguist, anthropologist, humanist. Berkeley: University of California Press.
- Darnell, Regna (2006). "Benjamin Lee Whorf and the Boasian Foundations of Contemporary Ethnolinguistics". In Jourdan, Christine; Tuite, Kevin (eds.). Language, Culture and Society. Cambridge: Cambridge University Press. pp. 82–95.
- Davidson, Donald (1973). "On the very idea of a conceptual scheme". Proceedings and Addresses of the American Philosophical Association. 47: 5–20. doi:10.2307/3129898. JSTOR 3129898.
- Deutscher, Guy (2010). Through the Language Glass: Why the World Looks Different in Other Languages. MacMillan.
- Dinwoodie, David W. (2006). "Time and the Individual in Native North America". In Sergei Kan; Pauline Turner Strong; Raymond Fogelson (eds.). New Perspectives on Native North America: Cultures, Histories, And Representations. U of Nebraska.
- Dufva, Hannele (2004). "Language, Thinking and Embodiment: Bakhtin, Whorf and Merleau-Ponty". In Bostad, Finn; Brandist, Craig; Evensen, Lars Sigfred; et al. (eds.). Bakhtinian Perspectives on Language and Culture Meaning in Language, Art and New Media. Palgrave Macmillan. pp. 133=47.
- Duranti, Alessandro (2003). "Language as Culture in U.S. Anthropology: Three Paradigms". Current Anthropology. 44 (3): 323–347. doi:10.1086/368118. S2CID 148075449.
- Gumperz, John; Levinson, Stephen C. (1996). "Introduction: Linguistic Relativity Re-examined". In John Gumperz; Stephen C. Levinson (eds.). Rethinking Linguistic Relativity. Cambridge: Cambridge University Press.
- Halliday, M.A.K. (1985). "Systemic Background.". Systemic Perspectives on Discourse. Vol. 3 The Collected Works of M.A.K. Halliday. London: Continuum.
- Heynick, Frank (1983). "From Einstein to Whorf: Space, time, matter, and reference frames in physical and linguistic relativity". Semiotica. 45 (1–2): 35–64. doi:10.1515/semi.1983.45.1-2.35. S2CID 170121402.
- Houston, Stephen D.; Chinchilla Mazariegos, Oswaldo Fernando; Stuart, David (2001). The Decipherment of Ancient Maya Writing. University of Oklahoma Press.
- Hutton, Christopher M.; Joseph, John E. (1998). "Back to Blavatsky: the impact of theosophy on modern linguistics". Language & Communication. 18 (3): 181–204. doi:10.1016/S0271-5309(97)00031-1.
- Hymes, Dell H.; Fought, John G. (1981). American Structuralism. Walter de Gruyter.
- Joseph, John E. (2002). "The Sources of the Sapir-Whorf Hypothesis". From Whitney to Chomsky: Essays in the History of American Linguistics. John Benjamins Publishing Company.
- Kay, Paul; Kempton, Willett (1984). "What Is the Sapir-Whorf Hypothesis?". American Anthropologist. New Series. 86 (1): 65–79. doi:10.1525/aa.1984.86.1.02a00050.
- Kienpointner, M. (1996). "Whorf and Wittgenstein. Language, world view and argumentation". Argumentation. 10 (4): 475–494. doi:10.1007/BF00142980. S2CID 170708264.
- Lakoff, George (1987). Women, fire, and dangerous things. University Of Chicago Press.
- Lamb, Sydney M. (2000). "Neuro-Cognitive Structure in the Interplay of Language and Thought". In Pütz, Martin; Verspoor, Marjolyn (eds.). Explorations in Linguistic Relativity. John Benjamins Publishing Company. pp. 173–196. ISBN 978-90-272-3706-4.
- Leavitt, John (2011). Linguistic Relativities: Language Diversity and Modern Thought. Cambridge, UK: Cambridge University Press. ISBN 978-0-521-76782-8.
- Lee, Penny (2000). "When is "Linguistic Relativity" Whorf's Linguistic Relativity?". In Pütz, Martin; Verspoor, Marjolyn (eds.). Explorations in linguistic relativity. John Benjamins Publishing Company. pp. 45–66. ISBN 978-90-272-3706-4.
- Lee, Penny (1997). "Language in Thinking and Learning: Pedagogy and the New Whorfian Framework". Harvard Educational Review. 67 (3): 430–472. doi:10.17763/haer.67.3.m2q0530x2r574117.
- Lee, Penny (1996). The Whorf Theory Complex — A Critical Reconstruction. John Benjamins.
- Lee, Penny (1991). "Whorf's Hopi tensors: Subtle articulators in the language/thought nexus?". Cognitive Linguistics. 2 (2): 123–148. doi:10.1515/cogl.1991.2.2.123. S2CID 143773292.
- Lenneberg, Eric; Roberts, J. R. (1956). "The Language of Experience: a Study in Methodology". Indiana University Publications in Anthropology and Linguistics. Baltimore: Waverly Press.
- Lenneberg, Eric (1953). "Cognition in Ethnolinguistics". Language. 29 (4): 463–471. doi:10.2307/409956. JSTOR 409956.
- Levinson, Stephen C (2012). "Foreword". In Carroll, John B; Levinson, Stephen C; Lee, Penny (eds.). Language, Thought and Reality (2nd ed.). Cambridge, Mass/London, UK: MIT Press. pp. vii–xxiii. ISBN 978-0-262-51775-1.
- Lucy, John A. (1997). "Linguistic Relativity". Annual Review of Anthropology. 26: 291–312. doi:10.1146/annurev.anthro.26.1.291.
- Lucy, John A. (1992a). Grammatical Categories and Cognition: A Case Study of the Linguistic Relativity Hypothesis. Cambridge, UK: Cambridge University Press.
- Lucy, John A. (1992b). Language Diversity and Thought: A Reformulation of the Linguistic Relativity Hypothesis. Cambridge, UK: Cambridge University Press.
- Lucy, John A.; Wertsch, J. (1987). "Vygotsky and Whorf: A comparative analysis". In M. Hickmann (ed.). Social and functional approaches to language and thought. Cambridge, UK: Cambridge University Press. pp. 67–86.
- Malotki, Ekkehart (1983). Werner Winter (ed.). "Hopi Time: A Linguistic Analysis of the Temporal Concepts in the Hopi Language". Trends in Linguistics. Studies and Monographs. 20. Berlin, New York, Amsterdam: Mouton Publishers.
- McWhorter, John (2009). Our Magnificent Bastard Tongue: The Untold History of English. Penguin.
- Mertz, Elizabeth; Yovel, Jonathan (2010). "Metalinguistic Awareness". In Verschueren, Jef; Östman, Jan-Ola (eds.). Handbook of Pragmatics Highlights. Kluwer.
- Newcombe, Nora S.; Uttal, David H. (2006). "Whorf versus Socrates, round 10". Trends in Cognitive Sciences. 10 (9): 394–396. doi:10.1016/j.tics.2006.07.008. PMID 16899401. S2CID 18582377.
- Niemeier, Susanne; Dirven, René, eds. (1997). Evidence for linguistic relativity. John Benjamins Publishing Company. ISBN 978-90-272-3705-7.
- Nisbett, R. (2003). The Geography of Thought. New York: The Free Press. ISBN 9780743216463.
- Parry-Jones, Anthony (1997). "Review of: Penny Lee – The Whorf Theory Complex: A Critical Reconstruction" (PDF). Henry Sweet Society Bulletin (29). Archived from the original (PDF) on November 21, 2008.
- Pinker, Steven (1994). The Language Instinct: How the Mind Creates Language. Perennial.
- Pinker, Steven (2007). The Stuff of Thought: Language as a window into human nature. Penguin Books.
- Pula, R (1992). "The Nietzsche-Korzybski-Sapir-Whorf Hypothesis?". ETC: A Review of General Semantics. 49 (1): 50–57.
- Pullum, Geoffrey (1991). The Great Eskimo Vocabulary Hoax and other Irreverent Essays on the Study of Language (PDF). Chicago University Press. Archived from the original (PDF) on October 9, 2022.
- Pütz, Martin; Verspoor, Marjolyn, eds. (2000). Explorations in linguistic relativity. John Benjamins Publishing Company. ISBN 978-90-272-3706-4.
- Reines, Maria Francisca; Prinze, Jesse (2009). "Reviving Whorf: The Return of Linguistic Relativity". Philosophy Compass. 4 (6): 1022–1032. doi:10.1111/j.1747-9991.2009.00260.x.
- Ridington, Robin (1987). "Models of the Universe: The Poetic Paradign [sic] of Benjamin Lee Whorf". Anthropology and Humanism Quarterly. 12: 16–24. doi:10.1525/ahu.1987.12.1.16.
- Rollins, P. C. (1971). "Benjamin Lee Whorf: Transcendental Linguist". The Journal of Popular Culture. 5 (3): 673–696. doi:10.1111/j.0022-3840.1971.0503_673.x.
- Rollins, P. C. (1972). "The Whorf Hypothesis as a Critique of Western Science and Technology". American Quarterly. 24 (5): 563–583. doi:10.2307/2711660. JSTOR 2711660.
- Schultz, Emily Ann (1990). Dialogue at the Margins: Whorf, Bakhtin, and Linguistic Relativity. University of Wisconsin Press.
- Silverstein, Michael (1979). "Language structure and linguistic ideology". In R. Cline; W. Hanks; C. Hofbauer (eds.). The Elements: A Parasession on Linguistic Units and Levels. Chicago: Chicago Linguistic Society. pp. 193–247.
- Subbiondo, J. L. (2005). "Benjamin Lee Whorf's theory of language, culture, and consciousness: A critique of western science". Language & Communication. 25 (2): 149–159. doi:10.1016/j.langcom.2005.02.001.
- Thompson, J.E.S. (1950). "Appendix III "Whorf's attempts to decipher the Maya Hieroglyphs"". Maya Hieroglyphic Writing: An Introduction. Washington D.C.: Carnegie Institution of Washington.
- Trager, George L. (1959). "The Systematization of the Whorf Hypothesis". Anthropological Linguistics. 1 (1). Operational Models in Synchronic Linguistics: A Symposium Presented at the 1958 Meetings of the American Anthropological Association: 31–35.
- Trager, George L.; Bloch, Bernard (1941). "The syllabic phonemes of English". Language. 17 (3): 223–246. doi:10.2307/409203. JSTOR 409203.
- Whorf, Benjamin Lee; Campbell, Lyle; Karttunen, Frances (1993). "Pitch Tone and the "Saltillo" in Modern and Ancient Nahuatl". International Journal of American Linguistics. 59 (2): 165–223. doi:10.1086/466194. OCLC 1753556. S2CID 144639961.
- Zhou, Minglang (2000). "Metalinguistic awareness in linguistic relativity: Cultural and subcultural practices across Chinese dialect communities". In Pütz, Martin; Verspoor, Marjolyn (eds.). Explorations in linguistic relativity. John Benjamins Publishing Company. ISBN 978-90-272-3706-4.
