= Educating Eve =

1997 book by Geoffrey Sampson

Educating Eve: The 'Language Instinct' Debate
- first edition
- Author: Geoffrey Sampson
- Original title: Educating Eve
- Language: English
- Genre: Non-fiction (Linguistics)
- Publisher: Continuum International Publishing Group
- Publication date: 1997
- Publication place: United Kingdom
- Media type: Print (Hardback)
- ISBN: 978-0-304-33908-2
- Dewey Decimal: 401 21
- LC Class: P37.5.I55 S26 1997
- Followed by: The 'Language Instinct' Debate. Revised edition.

Educating Eve: The 'Language Instinct' Debate is a book by Geoffrey Sampson, providing arguments against Noam Chomsky's theory of a human instinct for (first) language acquisition. Sampson explains the original title of the book as a deliberate allusion to Educating Rita (1980), and uses the plot of that play to illustrate his argument. Sampson's book is a response to Steven Pinker's The Language Instinct specifically and Chomskyan linguistic nativism broadly.

The title, Educating Eve, was dropped after the first edition because the allusion to Educating Rita "was deemed unduly mysterious". The revised edition (2005) contains an additional chapter and "many passages, from a few words up to new chapter-sections, that discuss relevant scientific findings which have emerged since the first edition, or respond to objections made by critics of that edition."

== Abstract ==
Sampson critically evaluates the ability of theories of linguistic nativism to accommodate the growing understanding of human brain processing over the course of the late 20th century. He proposes an alternative explanation, borrowing some ideas and terminology from Karl Popper.

== Overview ==
"Eve was not a born know-all. She was ignorant. But she was a good learner."

- "Eve was not a born know-all. She was ignorant. But she was a good learner." — Geoffrey Sampson, Educating Eve

The book has seven chapters introduced by a foreword by Paul Postal who claims an agnostic position regarding the debate. He expresses serious concerns regarding the strength of the "nativist" argument; but despite being unconvinced of the alternative view, he commends Sampson for challenging nativism and attempting to make a case for an alternative.

The first chapter of Educating Eve considers broad contours of the nature versus nurture debate in regard to human knowledge generally, before narrowing this down to the rise of late 20th century linguistic nativism in particular. It concludes with an overview of the methodology of the rest of the book. Chapter 2 reports evidence that was available to the "first wave" of nativists (like Chomsky) during the 1960s and 1970s. Chapter 3 reports the results of research that have become available since then. Chapter 4 turns to examining the distinctive arguments of "new wave" nativists (like Pinker). Chapter 5 presents a case for an alternative view. In chapter 7 Sampson concludes with a short personal perspective on sociological changes in the nature of academic discourse over the 40 years of the debate regarding nativism. He attributes the popularity of nativism to various features of these sociological changes.

== Annotated journal commentary ==
- Victor M. Longa. Review for Linguistics 37 (1999): 325–344.
- Geoffrey Sampson. "Reply to Longa" Linguistics 37 (1999): 345–350.
- James H. Hurford. Review for Journal of Linguistics 36 (2000): 663–664.
- Ernst Pulgram. Review for Language 76 (2000): 704.
- Stephen John Cowley. "The Baby, the Bathwater, and the 'Language Instinct' Debate". Language Sciences 23 (2001): 69–91. [challenges an assumption held by both sides, and proposes an alternative, third explanation]
- The Linguistic Review 19 (2002). [devoted to debating linguistic nativism]
- Ben G. Blount. "Nativism Revisited: Language and the Brain". Current Anthropology 43 (2002): 340. [Blount is a linguistic anthropologist]
- Michael Toolan. Review for Language in Society 36 (2007): 622–626.
- Julia Herschensohn. "Theory and Practice". Review for The Modern Language Journal 91 (2007): 486–487.
- Eve Zyzik. Review for Studies in Second Language Acquisition 29 (2007): 134–136.
- John H McWhorter. Review for Language 84 (2008): 434–437.

Cowley, and some others, view Sampson and Pinker as standing at extreme ends of a nature–nurture spectrum, as applied to explaining language acquisition. Cowley notes philosophical difficulties with each extreme, as they are argued by Sampson and Pinker: Sampson's version of the nurture position also argues for philosophical dualism; whereas Pinker's version of the nature position also argues for an ontological reality for syntax. Both these auxiliary arguments are unsatisfactory to many writers who address the relevant broader philosophical questions.

Cowley proposes an alternative: that language acquisition involves culturally determined language skills, apprehended by a biologically determined faculty that responds to them. In other words, he proposes that each extreme is right in what it affirms, but wrong in what it denies. Both cultural diversity of language, and a learning instinct, can be affirmed; neither need be denied.

== See also ==
- Genie (feral child)
- Poverty of the stimulus

== Bibliography ==
=== Works cited in notes and references ===
Karl Popper

- (in German) Die beiden Grundprobleme der Erkenntnistheorie. Tübingen: de:Mohr Siebeck Verlag, 1979.

[An unpublished typescript also circulated from the early 1930s, since edited by TE Hansen for his biography of Popper.]

- (in German) Logik der Forschung: zur Erkenntnistheorie der Modernen naturwissenschaft. Wien: Springer Verlag, 1935.

Noam Chomsky

Steven Pinker

- The Language Instinct: the new science of language and mind. New York: William Morrow and Company, 1994.
- How the Mind Works. Penguin Books, 1997.
- Words and Rules: the ingredients of language. Weidenfeld & Nicolson, 1999.
- The Blank Slate: the modern denial of human nature. Penguin Books, 2003.

Geoffrey Sampson

- Educating Eve: The 'Language Instinct' Debate. London: Continuum International Publishing Group, 1997.
- The 'Language Instinct' Debate. Revised edition. London: Continuum International Publishing Group, 2005.

=== Selected bibliography of other works ===
- Culicover, Peter W. "Minimalist architectures". Review of Ray Jackendoff. The Architecture of the Language Faculty. MIT Press, 1997. In Journal of Linguistics 35 (1999): 137–50.
- Curtiss, Susan. "Genie: a Psycholinguistic Study of a Modern-Day 'Wild Child'". New York: Academic Press, 1977.
- Jones, Peter. "Contradictions and unanswered questions in the Genie case: a fresh look at the linguistic evidence". Language and Communication 15 (1995): 261–80.
- Harkness, S. "A cultural model for the acquisition of language: implications for the innateness debate". Developmental Psychobiology 27 (1990): 727–40.
- Lenneberg, Eric. Biological Foundations of Language. New York: John Wiley & Sons, 1967.
- Lust, Barbara and Claire Foley (eds). First language acquisition: the essential readings. Malden, Massachusetts: Blackwell Publishing, 2004.
- Savage-Rumbaugh, E Sue. "Language acquisition in a nonhuman species: implications for the innateness debate". Developmental Psychobiology 23 (1990): 599–620.
- Smith, Niel V. "Backlash". Glot International 5 (2001): 169–171.
- Philosophical Papers 18 (1989): xx–xx.
