= How the Mind Works =

1997 book by Steven Pinker

- Cover of the first edition
- Author: Steven Pinker
- Language: English
- Subject: Cognitive science
- Publisher: W. W. Norton & Company
- Publication date: 1997
- Media type: Print (hardcover and paperback)
- Pages: 660
- ISBN: 978-0-393-04535-2
- Preceded by: The Language Instinct
- Followed by: Words and Rules

How the Mind Works is a 1997 book by the Canadian-American cognitive psychologist Steven Pinker, in which the author attempts to explain some of the human mind's poorly understood functions and quirks in evolutionary terms. Drawing heavily on the paradigm of evolutionary psychology articulated by John Tooby and Leda Cosmides, Pinker covers subjects such as vision, emotion, feminism, and "the meaning of life". He argues for both a computational theory of mind and a neo-Darwinist, adaptationist approach to evolution, all of which he sees as the central components of evolutionary psychology. He criticizes difference feminism because he believes scientific research has shown that women and men differ little or not at all in their moral reasoning. The book was a Pulitzer Prize Finalist.

== Reception ==
Jerry Fodor, considered one of the fathers of the computational theory of mind, criticized the book. Fodor wrote a book called The Mind Doesn't Work That Way, saying "There is, in short, every reason to suppose that the Computational Theory is part of the truth about cognition. But it hadn't occurred to me that anyone could suppose that it's a very large part of the truth; still less that it's within miles of being the whole story about how the mind works". He continued, "I was, and remain, perplexed by an attitude of ebullient optimism that's particularly characteristic of Pinker's book. As just remarked, I would have thought that the last forty or fifty years have demonstrated pretty clearly that there are aspects of higher mental processes into which the current armamentarium of computational models, theories and experimental techniques offers vanishingly little insight."

Pinker responded to Fodor's criticisms in Mind & Language. Pinker argued that Fodor had attacked straw man positions, wryly suggesting a possible title for his riposte as No One Ever Said it Did.

Daniel Levitin has criticized Pinker for referring to music as an "auditory cheesecake" in the book. In his book This Is Your Brain on Music (2006), Levitin takes some time in the last chapter to rebut Pinker's arguments. When asked about Levitin's book by New York Times journalist Clive Thompson, Pinker said he hadn't read it.
