= Victoria Morgan =

American biomedical engineer

Victoria L. Morgan
- Education: Vanderbilt University; Wright State University
- Scientific career
- Workplaces: Vanderbilt University
- Thesis: Phase contrast MRI evaluation of three dimensional blood flow patterns in the pulmonary circulation post fontan (1996)

Victoria L. Morgan is an American biomedical engineer who is a professor of neurology and radiology at Vanderbilt University. She makes use of functional magnetic resonance imaging to understand neural activation and function. Her research looks to quantify and understand the impact of epilepsy in the brain.

== Early life and education ==
Morgan's master's research involved the optimization of processing techniques for phase contrast in Magnetic Resonance Imaging (MRI). She continued to use MRI throughout her doctoral research, examining pulmonary circulation after the Fontan procedure.

== Research and career ==
Morgan joined the faculty at Vanderbilt University in 1999. Morgan makes use of functional MRI (fMRI) to understand the impacts of epilepsy on the brain. For people who suffer from temporal lobe epilepsy, Morgan believes that fMRI can be used to localize the focus of seizures and the networks of seizure propagation.

Through the use of fMRI, Morgan creates neuronal function network maps, allowing the brain circuitry to be viewed as a collection of nodes and edges. fMRI measures neuronal activity through changes of blood flow. By using diffusion-weighted MI, it is possible to monitor how water moves through white matter tracts. She has shown that the functional network maps of epileptic patients are different to those of healthy controls, and that the differences correlate with the severity and duration of the patient's epilepsy. She has shown that patients who have successful surgeries (i.e., their seizures decrease) show particular patterns in their function network maps, whilst others are much less likely to respond so positively to the surgical intervention. By monitoring the seizure associated neuronal networks Morgan is able to predict the recurrence of epilepsy. The combination of fMRI and MRI can be used to predict how patients may respond to different therapies, improving success rates. These data may help to identify biomarkers that can be used to treat and understand epilepsy.

== Selected publications ==
- E Grossman; M Donnelly; R Price; D Pickens; V Morgan; G Neighbor; R Blake (2000). "Brain areas involved in perception of biological motion". Journal of Cognitive Neuroscience. 12 (5): 711–20. doi:10.1162/089892900562417. PMID 11054914. Wikidata Q28142468.
- Christine H. Lorenz; Eloisa S. Walker; Morgan, Victoria; Stacy S. Klein; Thomas P. Graham (1999). "Normal human right and left ventricular mass, systolic function, and gender differences by cine magnetic resonance imaging". Journal of Cardiovascular Magnetic Resonance. 1 (1): 7–21. PMID 11550343. Wikidata Q52934450.
- Howard Mertz; Morgan, Victoria; Gordon Tanner; David Pickens; Ronald Price; Yu Shyr; Robert Kessler (2000). "Regional cerebral activation in irritable bowel syndrome and control subjects with painful and nonpainful rectal distention". Gastroenterology. 118 (5): 842–848. doi:10.1016/s0016-5085(00)70170-3. PMID 10784583. Wikidata Q73719427.
