= Steven Pinker =

Canadian-American psycholinguist (born 1954)

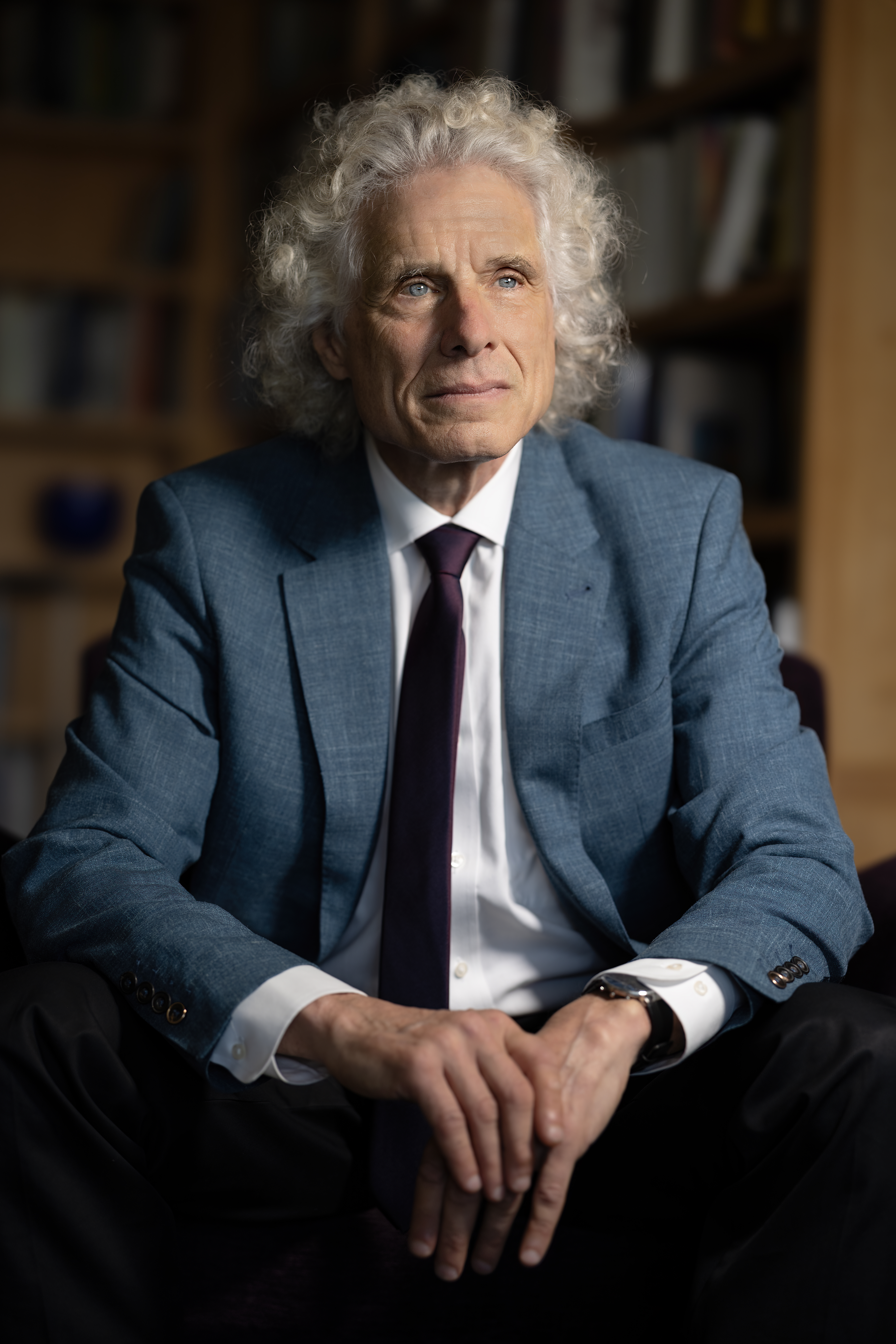
- Pinker in 2023
- Born: September 18, 1954 (age 72); Montreal, Quebec, Canada
- Education: Dawson College (DCS); McGill University (BA); Harvard University (PhD)
- Notable work: The Language Instinct (1994); How the Mind Works (1997); The Blank Slate (2002); The Better Angels of Our Nature (2011); Enlightenment Now (2018); Rationality (2021)
- Spouses: Nancy Etcoff (m. 1980; div. 1992) Ilavenil Subbiah (m. 1995; div. 2006) Rebecca Goldstein (m. 2007)
- Relatives: Susan Pinker (sister)
- Scientific career
- Awards: Troland Award (1993); Henry Dale Prize (2004, Royal Institution); Walter P. Kistler Book Award (2005); Humanist of the Year Award (2006); CNS George Miller Prize (2010); Richard Dawkins Award (2013); Carl Sagan Award for Public Appreciation of Science (2018); BBVA Foundation Frontiers of Knowledge Award (2022)
- Fields: Evolutionary psychology; Experimental psychology; Cognitive science; Psycholinguistics
- Workplaces: Harvard University; Stanford University; Massachusetts Institute of Technology; New College of the Humanities
- Thesis: The representation and manipulation of three-dimensional space in mental images (1979)
- Doctoral advisor: Stephen Kosslyn
- Steven Pinker's voice from the BBC program Desert Island Discs, June 30, 2013
- Website: stevenpinker.com

Steven Arthur Pinker (born September 18, 1954) is a Canadian cognitive psychologist, psycholinguist, popular science author, and public intellectual. He is an advocate of evolutionary psychology and the computational theory of mind. Pinker is the Johnstone Family professor of psychology at Harvard University.

Pinker specializes in visual cognition and developmental linguistics, as well as a number of experimental topics. He has written two technical books that propose a general theory of language acquisition. In particular, his work with Alan Prince posits that children use default rules sometimes in error but are obliged to learn irregular forms one by one. Pinker is the author of nine books for general audiences. The Language Instinct (1994), How the Mind Works (1997), Words and Rules (2000), The Blank Slate (2002), and The Stuff of Thought (2007) posit that language is an innate behavior shaped by natural selection and adapted to our communication needs. The Sense of Style (2014) is a general language-oriented style guide. The Better Angels of Our Nature (2010) posits that violence in human societies has generally declined over time, and identifies six major trends and five historical forces of this decline. Enlightenment Now (2018) further argues that the human condition has generally improved over recent history because of reason, science, and humanism. The nature and importance of reason is also discussed in his book Rationality: What It Is, Why It Seems Scarce, Why It Matters (2021).

In 2004, Pinker was named in Time's "The 100 Most Influential People in the World Today", and in 2005, 2008, 2010, and 2011 in Foreign Policy's list of "Top 100 Global Thinkers". He was also included in Prospect Magazine's top 10 "World Thinkers" in 2013. He has won awards from the American Psychological Association, the National Academy of Sciences, the Royal Institution, the Cognitive Neuroscience Society, and the American Humanist Association. He has served on the editorial boards of various journals and the advisory boards of several institutions. Pinker chaired the Usage Panel of the American Heritage Dictionary from 2008 to 2018.

== Biography ==
Pinker was born on September 18, 1954, in Montreal, Quebec, to an upper-middle class secular Jewish family in an English-speaking community. He adopted atheism at 13 and has identified as a "cultural Jew".

His grandparents immigrated to Canada from Poland and Romania in 1926, and owned a small necktie factory in Montreal. His father, Harry, worked in real estate and was a lawyer. His mother, Roslyn, was originally a homemaker but later became a guidance counsellor and a high-school vice-principal. Pinker has called his mother "very intellectual" and "an intense reader [who] knows everything". He credits George Gamow's One Two Three... Infinity with sparking his love of science.

His brother, Robert, worked for the Canadian government for several decades as an administrator and a policy analyst, while his sister, Susan Pinker, is a psychologist and writer who authored The Sexual Paradox and The Village Effect. Susan is also a columnist for The Wall Street Journal.

Pinker graduated from Dawson College in 1971 with a Diploma of College Studies. He graduated from McGill University in 1976 with a Bachelor of Arts in psychology, then did doctoral studies in experimental psychology at Harvard University under Stephen Kosslyn, receiving a PhD in 1979. He did research at the Massachusetts Institute of Technology (MIT) for a year, then became a professor at Harvard and later, Stanford University.

From 1982 until 2003, Pinker taught at the Department of Brain and Cognitive Sciences at MIT, co-directing the Center for Cognitive Science from 1985 to 1994 and directing the Center for Cognitive Neuroscience from 1994 to 1999, taking a sabbatical at the University of California, Santa Barbara, in 1995–96.

Since 2003, he has served as the Johnstone Family Professor of Psychology at Harvard, and between 2008 and 2013 he also held the title of Harvard College Professor in recognition of his dedication to teaching. In the early 2010s, he gave lectures as a visiting professor at the New College of the Humanities, a private college in London.

Pinker married Nancy Etcoff in 1980 and they divorced in 1992; he married again in 1995 and they divorced. His third wife, whom he married in 2007, is the novelist and philosopher Rebecca Goldstein. He has two stepdaughters, the novelist Yael Goldstein Love and the poet Danielle Blau.

Pinker is an avid cyclist. He is an advocate of effective altruism, which he calls "one of the great new ideas of the 21st century".

== Linguistic career ==
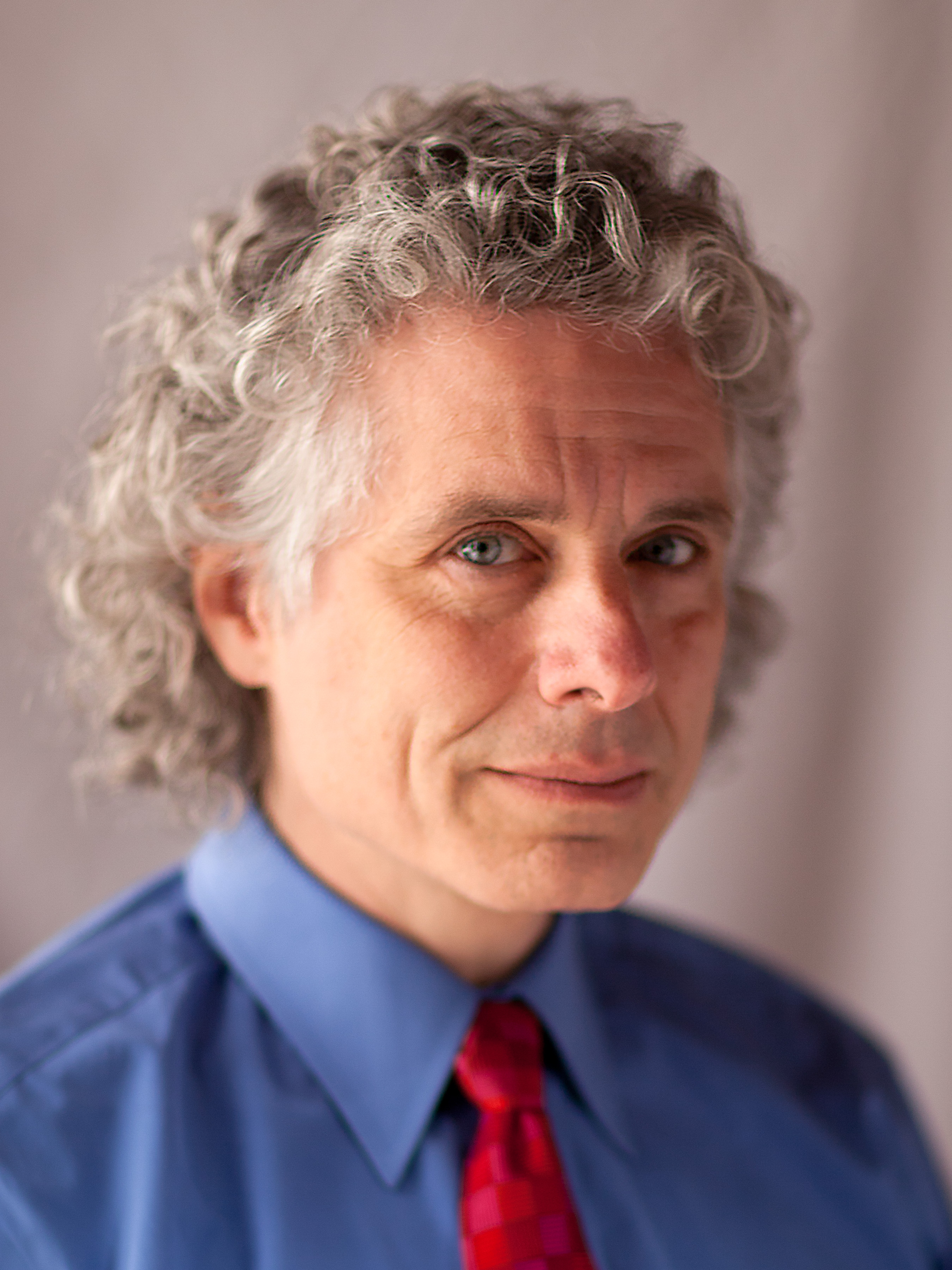
Pinker in 2011

Pinker's research on visual cognition, begun in collaboration with his thesis adviser, Stephen Kosslyn, showed that mental images represent scenes and objects as they appear from a specific vantage point (rather than capturing their intrinsic three-dimensional structure), and thus correspond to the neuroscientist David Marr's theory of a "two-and-a-half-dimensional sketch." He also showed that this level of representation is used in visual attention, and in object recognition (at least for asymmetrical shapes), contrary to Marr's theory that recognition uses viewpoint-independent representations.

In psycholinguistics, Pinker became known early in his career for promoting computational learning theory as a way to understand language acquisition in children. He wrote a tutorial review of the field followed by two books that advanced his own theory of language acquisition, and a series of experiments on how children acquire the passive, dative, and locative constructions. These books were Language Learnability and Language Development (1984), in Pinker's words "outlin[ing] a theory of how children acquire the words and grammatical structures of their mother tongue", and Learnability and Cognition: The Acquisition of Argument Structure (1989), in Pinker's words "focus[ing] on one aspect of this process, the ability to use different kinds of verbs in appropriate sentences, such as intransitive verbs, transitive verbs, and verbs taking different combinations of complements and indirect objects". He then focused on verbs of two kinds that illustrate what he considers to be the processes required for human language: retrieving whole words from memory, like the past form of the irregular verb "bring", namely "brought"; and using rules to combine (parts of) words, like the past form of the regular verb "walk", namely "walked".

In 1988 Pinker and Alan Prince published a critique of a connectionist model of the acquisition of the past tense (a textbook problem in language acquisition), followed by a series of studies of how people use and acquire the past tense. This included a monograph on children's regularization of irregular forms and his popular 1999 book, Words and Rules: The Ingredients of Language. Pinker argued that language depends on two things: the associative remembering of sounds and their meanings in words, and the use of rules to manipulate symbols for grammar. He presented evidence against connectionism, where a child would have to learn all forms of all words and would simply retrieve each needed form from memory, in favour of the older alternative theory, the use of words and rules combined by generative phonology. He showed that mistakes made by children indicate the use of default rules to add suffixes such as "-ed": for instance 'breaked' and 'comed' for 'broke' and 'came'. He argued that this shows that irregular verb-forms in English have to be learnt and retrieved from memory individually, and that the children making these errors were predicting the regular "-ed" ending in an open-ended way by applying a mental rule. This rule for combining verb stems and the usual suffix can be expressed as V_{past} → V_{stem} + d, where V is a verb and d is the regular ending. Pinker further argued that since the ten most frequently occurring English verbs (be, have, do, say, make ... ) are all irregular, while 98.2% of the thousand least common verbs are regular, there is a "massive correlation" of frequency and irregularity. He explains this by arguing that every irregular form, such as 'took', 'came' and 'got', has to be committed to memory by the children in each generation, or else lost, and that the common forms are the most easily memorized. Any irregular verb that falls in popularity past a certain point is lost, and all future generations will treat it as a regular verb instead.

In 1990 Pinker, with Paul Bloom, published a paper arguing that the human language faculty must have evolved through natural selection. The article argued for a continuity-based view of language evolution, contrary to then-current discontinuity-based theories that see language as suddenly appearing with the advent of Homo sapiens as a kind of evolutionary accident. This discontinuity-based view was prominently held by two main authorities, linguist Noam Chomsky and Stephen Jay Gould. The paper became widely cited and created renewed interest in the evolutionary prehistory of language, and has been credited with shifting the central question of the debate from "did language evolve?" to "how did language evolve?"

In 2006 Pinker provided to Alan Dershowitz, a personal friend of Pinker's who was Jeffrey Epstein's defense attorney, Pinker's own interpretation of the wording of a federal law pertaining to the enticement of minors into illegal sex acts via the internet. Dershowitz included Pinker's opinion in a letter to the court during proceedings that resulted in a plea deal in which all federal sex trafficking charges against Epstein were dropped. In 2019, Pinker said he was unaware of the nature of the charges against Epstein, and that he did an unpaid favor for Dershowitz, as he had regularly done. He said in an interview with BuzzFeed News that he regrets writing the letter. Pinker has said he never received money from Epstein, met with him three times over more than a dozen years, could never stand Epstein, and tried to keep his distance.

== Popularization of science ==
=== Human cognition and natural language ===
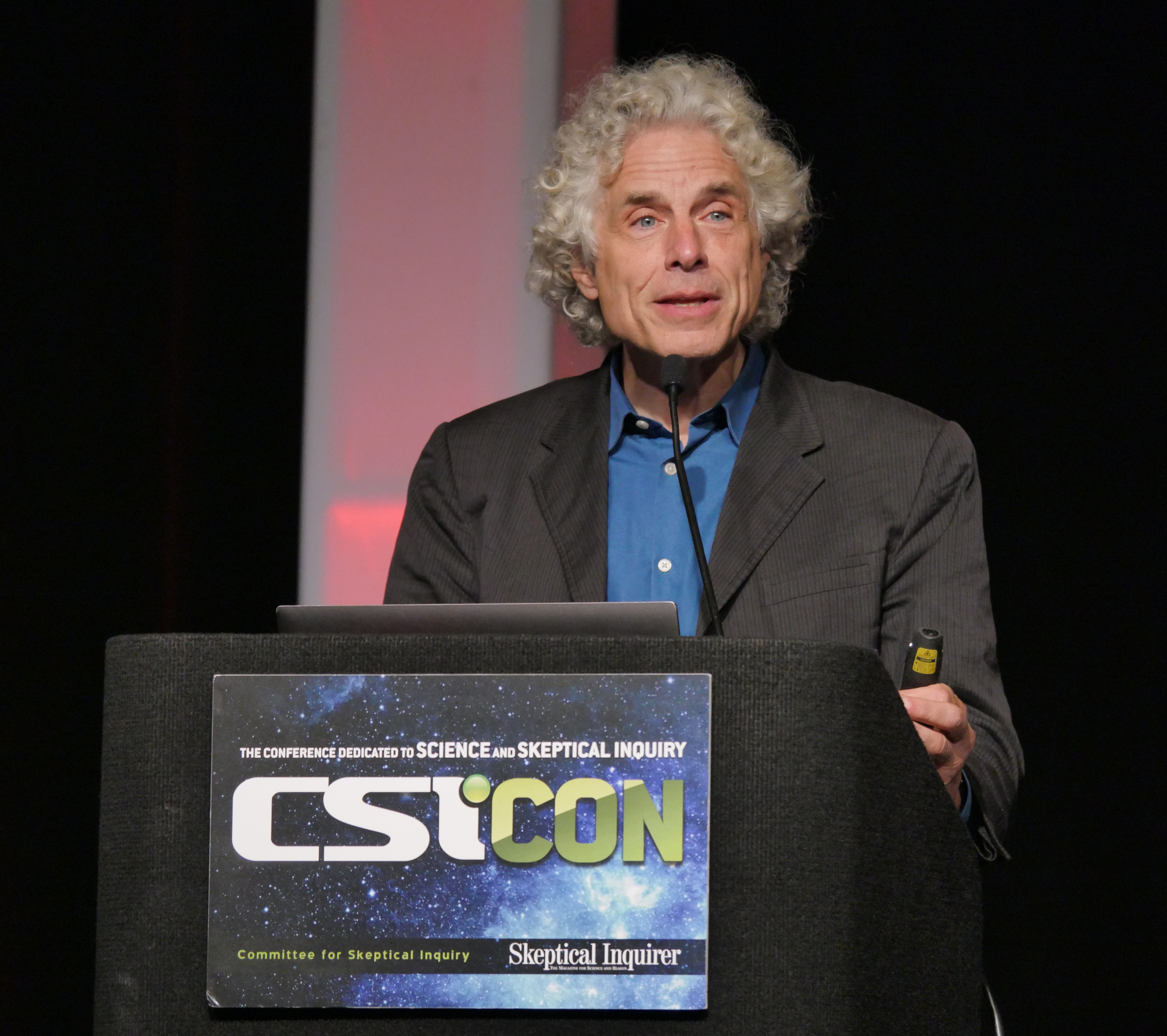
Pinker at CSICon in 2018, hosted by the Committee for Skeptical Inquiry

Pinker credits Richard Dawkins's The Blind Watchmaker (1986) with inspiring him to try his hand at science writing. The Language Instinct (1994) was the first of several books to combine cognitive science with linguistics and evolutionary psychology. It popularizes Noam Chomsky's theory that language is an innate faculty of mind, with the controversial twist that the faculty for language evolved by natural selection as an adaptation for communication. Pinker criticizes several widely held ideas about language – that it needs to be taught, that people's grammar is poor and getting worse with new ways of speaking, the Sapir–Whorf hypothesis that language limits the kinds of thoughts a person can have, and that other great apes can learn languages. Pinker sees language as unique to humans, evolved to solve the specific problem of communication among social hunter-gatherers. He argues that it is as much an instinct as specialized adaptative behavior in other species, such as a spider's web-weaving or a beaver's dam-building.

Pinker states in his introduction that his ideas are "deeply influenced" by Chomsky; he also lists scientists whom Chomsky influenced to "open up whole new areas of language study, from child development and speech perception to neurology and genetics" – Eric Lenneberg, George Miller, Roger Brown, Morris Halle and Alvin Liberman. Brown mentored Pinker through his thesis; Pinker stated that Brown's "funny and instructive" book Words and Things (1958) was one of the inspirations for The Language Instinct.

There has been debate about the explanatory adequacy of the theory. By 2015, the linguistic nativist views of Pinker and Chomsky had a number of challenges on the grounds that they had incorrect core assumptions and were inconsistent with research evidence from psycholinguistics and child language acquisition. The reality of Pinker's proposed language instinct, and the related claim that grammar is innate and genetically based, has been contested by linguists such as Geoffrey Sampson in his 1997 book Educating Eve: The 'Language Instinct' Debate. Sampson argues that "while it may seem attractive to argue the nature side of the 'nature versus nurture' debate, the nurture side may better support the creativity and nobility of the human mind." Sampson denies there is a language instinct, and argues that children can learn language because people can learn anything. Others have sought a middle ground between Pinker's nativism and Sampson's culturalism.

The assumptions underlying the nativist view have also been questioned in Jeffrey Elman's Rethinking Innateness: A Connectionist Perspective on Development, which defends the connectionist approach that Pinker attacked. In his 1996 book Impossible Minds, the machine intelligence researcher Igor Aleksander calls The Language Instinct excellent, and argues that Pinker presents a relatively soft claim for innatism, accompanied by a strong dislike of the 'Standard Social Sciences Model' or SSSM (Pinker's term), according to which development is purely dependent on culture. Further, Aleksander writes that while Pinker criticises some attempts to explain language processing with neural nets, Pinker later makes use of a neural net to create past tense verb forms correctly. Aleksander concludes that while he doesn't support the SSSM, "a cultural repository of language just seems the easy trick for an efficient evolutionary system armed with an iconic state machine to play."

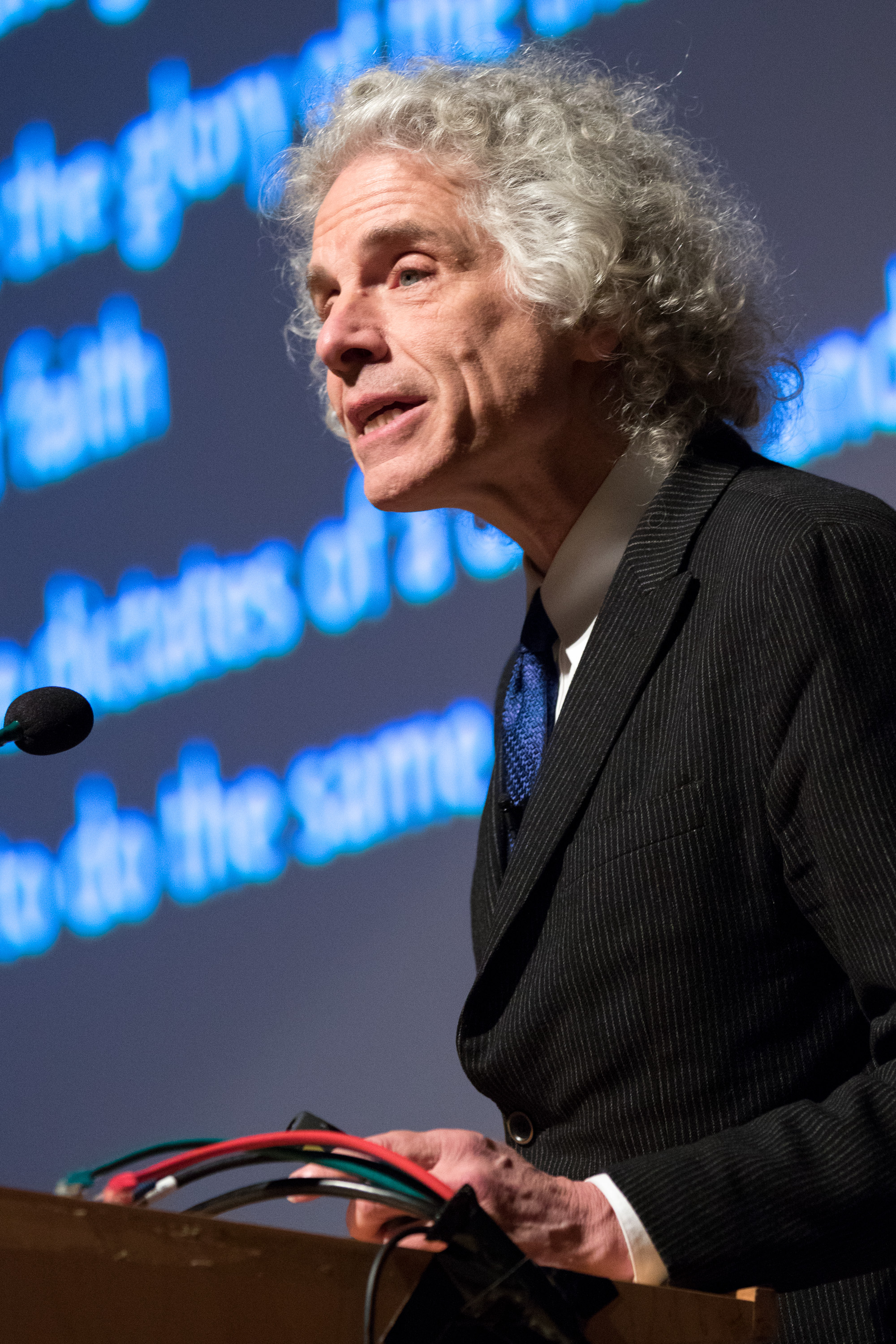
Pinker lecturing to humanists in the United Kingdom (2018)

Two other books, How the Mind Works (1997) and The Blank Slate (2002), broadly survey the mind and defend the idea of a complex human nature with many mental faculties that are genetically adaptive (Pinker is an ally of Daniel Dennett and Richard Dawkins in many disputes surrounding adaptationism). Another major theme in Pinker's theories is that human cognition works, in part, by combinatorial symbol-manipulation, not just associations among sensory features, as in many connectionist models. Of the debate about The Blank Slate, Pinker called Thomas Sowell's book A Conflict of Visions "wonderful", and said that "The Tragic Vision" and the "Utopian Vision" are the views of human nature behind right- and left-wing ideologies.

In Words and Rules: the Ingredients of Language (1999), Pinker argues from his own research that regular and irregular phenomena are products of computation and memory lookup, respectively, and that language can be understood as an interaction between the two. "Words and Rules" is also the title of an essay by Pinker outlining many of the topics discussed in the book. Critiquing the book from the perspective of generative linguistics, Charles Yang, in the London Review of Books, wrote, "this book never runs low on hubris or hyperbole". The book's topic, the English past tense, is in Yang's view unglamorous, and Pinker's attempts at compromise risk being in no man's land between rival theories. Giving the example of German, Yang argues that irregular nouns in that language at least all belong to classes, governed by rules, and that things get even worse in languages that attach prefixes and suffixes to make up long 'words': they can't be learnt individually, as there are untold numbers of combinations. "All Pinker (and the connectionists) are doing is turning over the rocks at the base of the intellectual landslide caused by the Chomskian revolution."

In The Stuff of Thought (2007), Pinker looks at a wide range of issues around the way words related to thoughts on the one hand, and to the world outside ourselves on the other. Given his evolutionary perspective, a central question is how an intelligent mind capable of abstract thought evolved: how a mind adapted to Stone Age life could work in the modern world. Many quirks of language are the result.

Pinker is critical of theories about the evolutionary origins of language that argue that linguistic cognition might have evolved from earlier musical cognition. He sees language as being tied primarily to the capacity for logical reasoning, and speculates that human proclivity for music may be a spandrel – a feature not adaptive in its own right, but that has persisted through other traits that are more broadly practical, and thus selected for. In How the Mind Works, Pinker reiterates Immanuel Kant's view that music is not in itself an important cognitive phenomenon, but that it happens to stimulate important auditory and spatio-motor cognitive functions. Pinker compares music to "auditory cheesecake", saying, "As far as biological cause and effect is concerned, music is useless". This argument has been rejected by Daniel Levitin and Joseph Carroll, experts in music cognition, who argue that music has had an important role in the evolution of human cognition. In his book This Is Your Brain On Music, Levitin argues that music could provide adaptive advantage through sexual selection, social bonding, and cognitive development; he questions the assumption that music is the antecedent to language, as opposed to its progenitor, noting that many species display music-like habits that could be seen as precursors to human music.

Pinker has also been critical of "whole language" reading instruction techniques, writing in How the Mind Works, "... the dominant technique, called 'whole language,' the insight that [spoken] language is a naturally developing human instinct has been garbled into the evolutionarily improbable claim that reading is a naturally developing human instinct." In the appendix to the 2007 reprinted edition of The Language Instinct, Pinker cited Why Our Children Can't Read by cognitive psychologist Diane McGuinness as his favorite book on the subject and noted:

One raging public debate involving language went unmentioned in The Language Instinct: the "reading wars," or dispute over whether children should be explicitly taught to read by decoding the sounds of words from their spelling (loosely known as "phonics") or whether they can develop it instinctively by being immersed in a text-rich environment (often called "whole language"). I tipped my hand in the paragraph in [the sixth chapter of the book] which said that language is an instinct but reading is not. Like most psycholinguists (but apparently unlike many school boards), I think it's essential for children to be taught to become aware of speech sounds and how they are coded in strings of letters.

He appeared in the PBS documentary Evolution, discussing the evolution of language.

He discussed "Language and the Mind" with Jonathan Miller on In Our Time.

=== The Better Angels of Our Nature ===
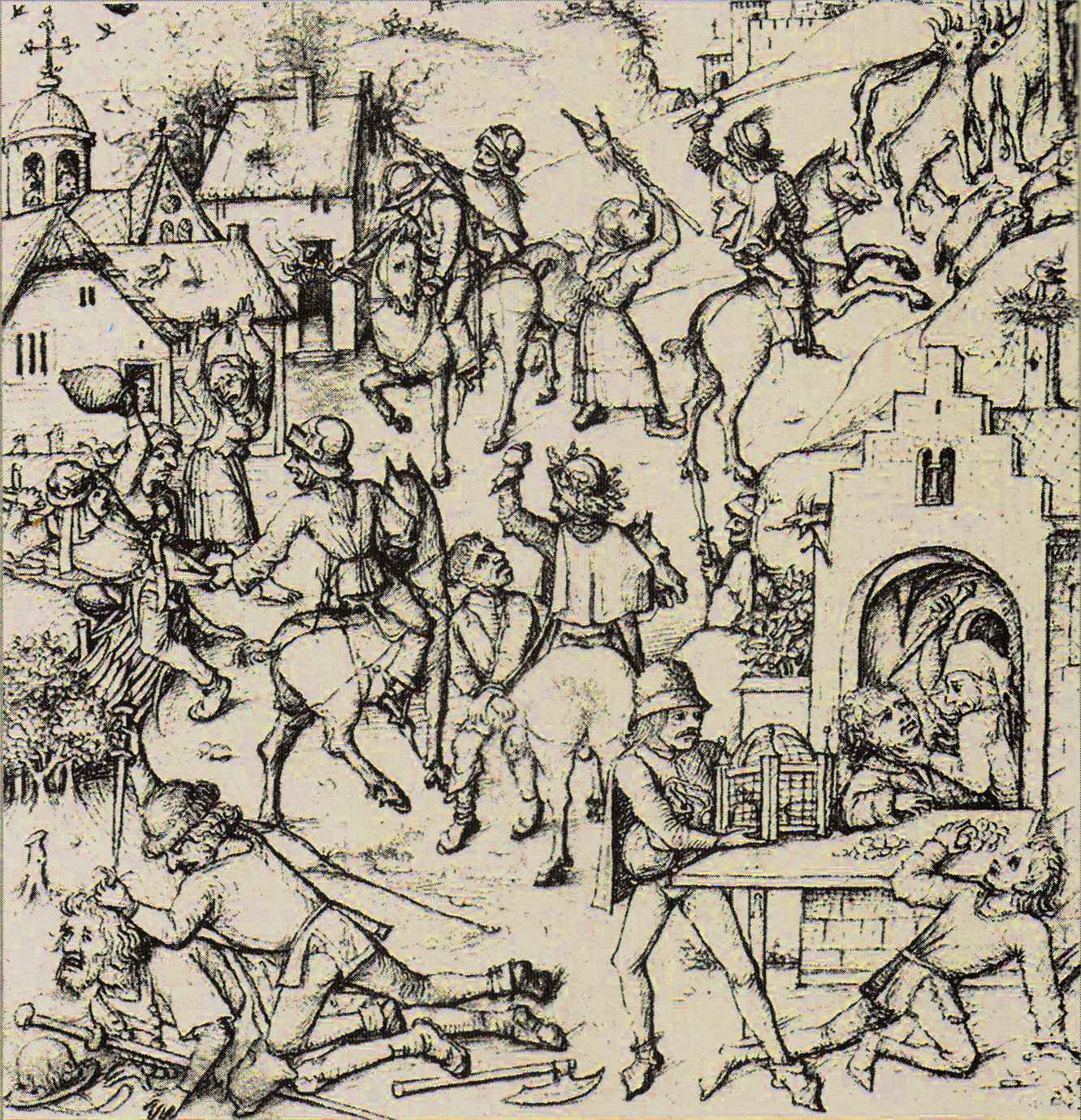
Detail from "Mars" in Das Mittelalterliche Hausbuch, c. 1475 – 1480. Pinker used the image in The Better Angels of Our Nature to illustrate violence in the Middle Ages.

In The Better Angels of Our Nature, published in 2011, Pinker argues that violence, including tribal warfare, homicide, cruel punishments, child abuse, animal cruelty, domestic violence, lynching, pogroms, and international and civil wars, has decreased over multiple scales of time and magnitude. Pinker considers it unlikely that human nature has changed. In his view, it is more likely that human nature comprises inclinations toward violence and those that counteract them, the "better angels of our nature". He outlines several "major historical declines of violence" that all have their own social/cultural/economic causes.

Response to the book was divided. Many critics found its arguments convincing and its synthesis of a large volume of historical evidence compelling. This and other aspects drew criticism, including the use of deaths per capita as a metric, Pinker's liberal humanism, the focus on Europe, the interpretation of historical data, and its image of indigenous people. Archaeologist David Wengrow summarized Pinker's approach to archaeological science as "a modern psychologist making it up as he goes along".

=== The Sense of Style ===
In his seventh popular book, The Sense of Style: The Thinking Person's Guide to Writing in the 21st Century (2014), Pinker attempts to provide a writing style guide that is informed by modern linguistics, science and psychology, regarding the existing style guides such as Strunk and White's Elements of Style as outdated and dogmatic.

=== When Everyone Knows That Everyone Knows... ===
Pinker's most recent book, When Everyone Knows That Everyone Knows…: Common Knowledge and the Mysteries of Money, Power, and Everyday Life, explores the concept of common knowledge, including what happens when everyone knows something and everyone knows that everyone knows it, and the role it plays in social coordination, conventions, economics, politics, and everyday human interaction. Drawing on examples from game theory, social norms, markets, and media, the book explains how common knowledge underpins phenomena as varied as driving on the same side of the road, financial bubbles, revolutions, and online culture, and how people both generate and avoid common knowledge in their social lives.

== Social views ==
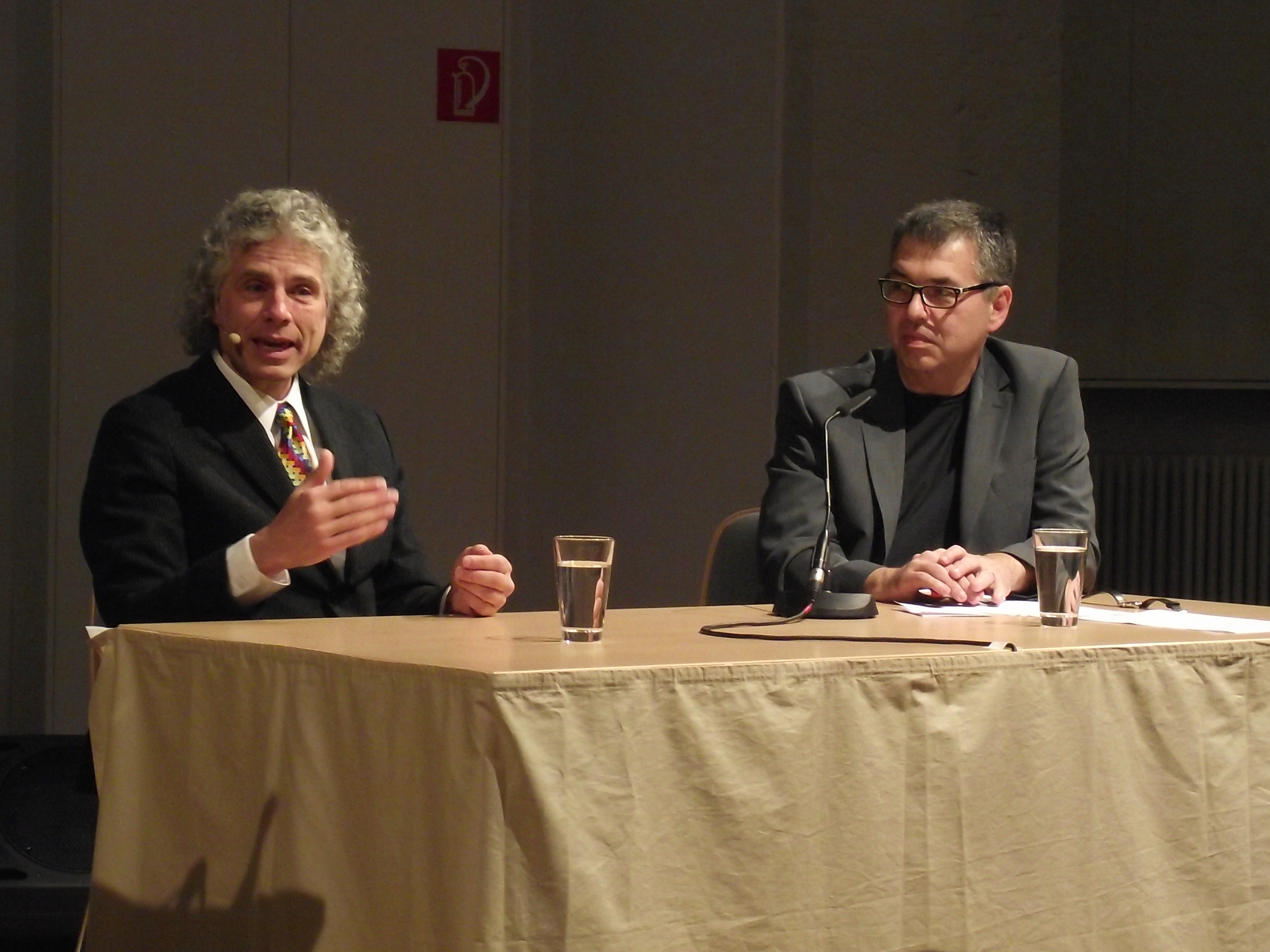
Pinker and Nils Brose speaking at a neuroscience conference

Pinker identifies as a social liberal who is critical of some aspects of the political left. He supports same-sex marriage, universal basic income, the legalization of drugs, the taxation of carbon, and the abolition of capital punishment. Pinker is a strong supporter of the Democratic Party.

Pinker has argued that the far left has created an atmosphere of intellectual intolerance on college campuses and elsewhere, and helped form the Council on Academic Freedom at Harvard to combat what he described as an epidemic of censorship at universities. He was a signatory of the Letter on Justice and Open Debate, which argued that discussion of political issues was being silenced by a widespread "intolerance of opposing views, a vogue for public shaming and ostracism, and a tendency to dissolve complex issues into a binding moral certainty."

Pinker has sharply criticized social conservatives, such as former chairman of the President's Council on Bioethics Leon Kass, for opposing stem cell research, arguing that their moral views were mere expressions of disgust that were obstructing treatments that could save millions of lives.

Pinker is a frequent participant in public debates on the contributions of science to contemporary society. Social commentators such as Ed West, author of The Diversity Illusion, consider Pinker important and daring in his willingness to confront taboos, as in The Blank Slate. According to West, the doctrine of tabula rasa remained accepted "as fact, rather than fantasy" a decade after the book's publication. West describes Pinker as "no polemicist, and he leaves readers to draw their own conclusions".

In 2005, Pinker began promoting the view that Ashkenazi Jews are innately particularly intelligent.

In January 2005, Pinker defended comments by then-president of Harvard University Lawrence Summers. Summers had speculated that in addition to differing societal demands and discrimination, "different availability of aptitude at the high end" may contribute to gender gaps in mathematics and science. In a debate between Pinker and Elizabeth Spelke on gender and science, Pinker argued in favour of the proposition that the gender difference in representation in elite universities was "explainable by some combination of biological differences in average temperaments and talents interacting with socialization and bias".

In January 2009, Pinker wrote an article about the Personal Genome Project and its possible impact on the understanding of human nature in The New York Times. He discussed the new developments in epigenetics and gene-environment interactions in the afterword to the 2016 edition of his book The Blank Slate. Pinker has been criticised for being associated with and using the data of scientific racists (on subjects unrelated to race), such as the blogger Steven Sailer. Journalist Angela Saini wrote, "for many people, Pinker's willingness to entertain the work of individuals who are on the far right and white supremacists has gone beyond the pale". Pinker has said that he condemns racism. In June 2025, he was criticised after he appeared on the podcast of the far-right scientific racism–associated Aporia Magazine.

In a November 2009 article for The New York Times, Pinker wrote a mixed review of Malcolm Gladwell's essays, criticizing his analytical methods. Gladwell replied, disputing Pinker's comments about the importance of IQ on teaching performance and by analogy the effect, if any, of draft order on quarterback performance in the National Football League. Advanced NFL Stats addressed the issue statistically, siding with Pinker and showing that differences in methodology could explain the two men's differing opinions.

While Pinker has acknowledged the consensus within psychometrics and differential psychology about the g factor in The Blank Slate and The Better Angels of Our Nature, he argued against the construct validity of general intelligence in How the Mind Works in favour of modularity of mind as proposed by evolutionary psychologists John Tooby and Leda Cosmides, and has reiterated his skepticism of the theoretical coherence of g when discussing artificial general intelligence.

In an appearance for BBC World Service's Exchanges At The Frontier programme, an audience member questioned whether the virtuous developments in culture and human nature (documented in The Better Angels of Our Nature) could have expressed in our biology, through genetic or epigenetic expression. Pinker responded that it was unlikely since "some of the declines have occurred far too rapidly for them to be explicable by biological evolution, which has a speed limit measured in generations, but crime can plummet in a span of 15 years and some of these humanitarian reforms like eliminating slavery and torture occurred in, say, 50 years". Helga Vierich and Cathryn Townsend wrote a critical review of Pinker's sweeping "civilizational" explanations for patterns of human violence and warfare in response to a lecture he gave at Cambridge University in September 2015.

In his 2018 book Enlightenment Now, Pinker posited that Enlightenment rationality should be defended against attacks from both the political left and political right. In a debate with Pinker, post-colonial theorist Homi Bhabha said that Enlightenment philosophy had immoral consequences such as inequality, slavery, imperialism, world wars, and genocide, and that Pinker downplayed them. Pinker argued that Bhabha had the causal relationship between Enlightenment thinking and these sources of suffering "backwards", saying: "The natural state of humanity, at least since the dawn of civilisation, is poverty, disease, ignorance, exploitation, and violence (including slavery and imperial conquest). It is knowledge, mobilised to improve human welfare, that allows anyone to rise above this state."

In 2020, an open letter to the Linguistic Society of America requesting Pinker's removal from its list of LSA Fellows and its list of media experts was signed by hundreds of academics. The letter accused Pinker of a "pattern of drowning out the voices of people suffering from racist and sexist violence, in particular in the immediate aftermath of violent acts and/or protests against the systems that created them", citing as examples six of Pinker's tweets. Pinker said in reply that through this letter, he, and more importantly, younger academics with less protection, were being threatened by "a regime of intimidation that constricts the theatre of ideas." Several academics criticized the letter and expressed support for Pinker. The executive committee of the Linguistic Society of America declined to strike Pinker from its lists and wrote in a response letter, "It is not the mission of the Society to control the opinions of its members, nor their expression."

Stephen Pinker (right) in conversation with journalist Caroline Steel in Salford, UK, promoting his book When Everyone Knows That Everyone Knows, 2025

In December 2024, Pinker resigned from the board of honorary members of the Freedom from Religion Foundation after the organisation retracted and apologised for publishing an anti-transgender article by Jerry Coyne defending the "biological reality of binary sex". Pinker accused the organisation of promoting a "quasi-religious" gender ideology. His resignation was followed by those of Coyne and Richard Dawkins, and the foundation subsequently dissolved its honorary board.

On May 23, 2025, in the wake of the Trump administration's announcement that it would halt Harvard University's ability to enroll international students, Pinker wrote a guest essay for The New York Times titled "Harvard Derangement Syndrome", which elicited many responses from readers that were published under the title "Harvard as Symbol and Target".

== Awards and distinctions ==
Pinker was named one of Time's 100 most influential people in the world in 2004 and one of Prospect and Foreign Policy's 100 top public intellectuals in both years the poll was carried out, 2005 and 2008; in 2010 and 2011 he was named by Foreign Policy to its list of top global thinkers. In 2016, he was elected to the National Academy of Sciences.

His research in cognitive psychology has won the Early Career Award (1984) and Boyd McCandless Award (1986) from the American Psychological Association, the Troland Research Award (1993) from the National Academy of Sciences, the Henry Dale Prize (2004) from the Royal Institution of Great Britain, and the George Miller Prize (2010) from the Cognitive Neuroscience Society. He has also received honorary doctorates from the universities of Newcastle, Surrey, Tel Aviv, McGill, Simon Fraser University and the University of Tromsø. He was twice a finalist for the Pulitzer Prize, in 1998 and in 2003. Pinker received the Golden Plate Award of the American Academy of Achievement in 1999. On May 13, 2006, he received the American Humanist Association's Humanist of the Year award for his contributions to public understanding of human evolution. For 2022 he was awarded the BBVA Foundation Frontiers of Knowledge Award in the category of "Humanities and Social Sciences".

From 2008 to 2018, Pinker chaired the Usage Panel of the American Heritage Dictionary. He wrote the essay on usage for the fifth edition of the Dictionary, published in 2011. In February 2001, Pinker, "whose hair has long been the object of admiration, and envy, and intense study", was nominated by acclamation as the first member of the Luxuriant Flowing Hair Club for Scientists (LFHCfS) organized by the Annals of Improbable Research.

Ian McEwan included The Language Instinct in his canon of science writing: "Steven Pinker's application of Darwinian thought to Chomskyan linguistics in The Language Instinct is one of the finest celebrations of language I know."

== Bibliography ==
=== Books ===
- Language Learnability and Language Development. Cambridge, Mass.: Harvard University Press. 1984. ISBN 9780674510548.
- Visual Cognition (1st MIT Press ed.). Cambridge, Mass.: MIT Press. 1985. ISBN 9780262161039.
- Connections and Symbols (1st MIT Press ed.). Cambridge, Mass.: MIT Press. 1988. ISBN 9780262660648.
- Learnability and Cognition: The Acquisition of Argument Structure. 1989.
- Lexical and Conceptual Semantics. 1992.
- The Language Instinct: How the Mind Creates Language. 1994.
- How the Mind Works. 1997.
- Words and Rules: The Ingredients of Language (1999)
- The Blank Slate: The Modern Denial of Human Nature (2002)
- The Best American Science and Nature Writing (editor and introduction author, 2004)
- Hotheads (an extract from How the Mind Works, 2005) ISBN 978-0-14-102238-3
- The Stuff of Thought: Language as a Window into Human Nature (2007)
- The Seven Words You Can't Say on Television (2008)
- The Better Angels of Our Nature: Why Violence Has Declined (2011)
- Language, Cognition, and Human Nature: Selected Articles (2013)
- The Sense of Style: The Thinking Person's Guide to Writing in the 21st Century (September 30, 2014)
- Enlightenment Now: The Case for Reason, Science, Humanism, and Progress (February 13, 2018)
- Rationality: What It Is, Why It Seems Scarce, Why It Matters (September 28, 2021)
- When Everyone Knows That Everyone Knows...: Common Knowledge and the Science of Harmony, Hypocrisy and Outrage. London: Allen Lane. 2025. ISBN 9780241618820.
