= Enlightenment Now =

2018 book by Steven Pinker

Enlightenment Now: The Case for Reason, Science, Humanism, and Progress
- Author: Steven Pinker
- Language: English
- Subject: Social philosophy
- Published: February 13, 2018
- Publisher: Penguin Books Limited/Viking
- Publication place: United States
- Media type: Print, digital
- Pages: 576
- ISBN: 978-0-525-42757-5 (Hardcover)

Enlightenment Now: The Case for Reason, Science, Humanism, and Progress is a 2018 book written by Canadian-American cognitive scientist Steven Pinker. It argues that the Enlightenment values of reason, science, and humanism have brought progress, and that health, prosperity, safety, peace, and happiness have tended to rise worldwide. It is a follow-up to Pinker's 2011 book, The Better Angels of Our Nature.

== Thesis ==
A commonly held lay public perception holds that the world is in terrible shape; for some, 2016 was the "worst year ever" and the year that liberalism died. In contrast, Pinker argues that life has been getting better for most people. He sets out 15 different measures of human wellbeing to support this argument, with the most obvious being the uncontroversial fact that, statistically, people live longer and healthier lives on average than ever before. As another example, while fears of terrorism are often voiced in U.S. opinion polls, Pinker shows that an American is 3,000 times more likely to die in an accident than in a terrorist attack. As in Pinker's previous The Better Angels of Our Nature, Pinker ascribes modern improvements to trends of liberal humanism and scientific rationality that first took root in Europe around the 17th and 18th centuries.

Pinker argues that economic inequality "is not itself a dimension of human wellbeing" and cites a study that finds inequality is not linked to unhappiness, at least in poorer societies. He also points out that the world as a whole is becoming more equal, and states that even within increasingly unequal areas, the poor are still getting wealth and benefit from technological innovations. For example, it is clear to Pinker that an innovation that makes the poor slightly richer and the rich massively richer is a positive rather than a negative achievement. In contrast, critics hold that enhancing social mobility and combating "inequality as a result of unfairness" are important legitimate ends in and of themselves, beyond any effects of reducing poverty.

On topics such as nuclear weaponry, Pinker places the blame on anti-Enlightenment forces. Scientists working on the Manhattan Project to develop the first nuclear weapons did so because they needed to beat Hitler; Pinker states "Quite possibly, had there been no Nazis, there would be no nukes." In contrast, critics point out that science lacks any ethical logic of its own. They argue that scientific progress is liberating but also threatening, and can present dangers precisely because of how hugely it expands human power. Pinker expresses concerns about potential human extinction from nuclear weapons or from global warming, but categorizes existential risks overall as a "useless category", stating that "Sowing fear about hypothetical disasters, far from safeguarding the future of humanity, can endanger it". In particular, Pinker departs from scholars such as Nick Bostrom regarding the possibility of accidental existential risk from artificial general intelligence, and makes a controversial argument that self-driving cars provide evidence that artificial general intelligence will pose no accidental existential risk.

The book concludes with three chapters defending what Pinker sees as Enlightenment values: reason, science, and humanism. Pinker argues that these values are under threat from modern trends such as religious fundamentalism, political correctness, and postmodernism. In an interview about the book published in Scientific American, Pinker has clarified that his book is not merely an expression of hope—it is a documentation of how much we have gained as a result of Enlightenment values, and how much we have to lose if those values are abandoned.

== Marketing ==
In January 2018 Bill Gates tweeted praise for Enlightenment Now, calling it "my new favorite book". Gates stated he agreed overall with the techno-optimism of the book, but cautioned that Pinker is too "quick to dismiss" the idea that artificial superintelligence could someday lead to human extinction. Citing reader interest due to Gates' endorsement, Viking Press moved the publication date from 27 February 2018 to 13 February 2018.

== Reception ==
=== Positive ===
Publishers Weekly gave the book a glowing review, concluding that "In an era of increasingly 'dystopian rhetoric,' Pinker’s sober, lucid, and meticulously researched vision of human progress is heartening and important." The Times also gave the book a positive review, stating that Pinker's arguments and evidence are "as entertaining as they are important", and expressing hope that Pinker's defense of the forces that have produced progress will be successful.

The New York Times described the book as "an excellent book, lucidly written, timely, rich in data and eloquent in its championing of a rational humanism that is — it turns out — really quite cool." The Economist agreed with Pinker that "barring a cataclysmic asteroid strike or nuclear war, it is likely that (the world) will continue to get better". Timothy Sandefur, writing for The Objective Standard, praised the book, noting, "Pinker's catalog of improvements is enjoyable, largely thanks to his witty style and skill at examining progress in unexpected ways."

In Skeptical Inquirer Kendrick Frazier concurs that Pinker "argues [his] case eloquently and ... effectively, drawing on both the demographic data and our improved understanding of human biases that get in our way of seeing the truth." In Nature, Ian Goldin wrote that Pinker should have focused more on future risks, although Pinker did devote a chapter to existential threats, and concludes with "But for the many overwhelmed by gloom, it is a welcome antidote." A review in the London Evening Standard agrees with Pinker's summary of how rationality has improved the world, and states "On Islamism, where his optimism falters, we have the interesting phenomenon of Muslim youth — not least in countries like Afghanistan — becoming less liberal than their parents" although they do not provide a source for this claim.

John P. Tang, writing in The Journal of Economic History, stated that Pinker demonstrates that "humanity has never had it so good, things until recently were much worse, and life will likely continue to improve." He stated the book provides an "empirical and quantitative approach to the topic, perhaps to the chagrin of humanities scholars, but consistent with current scholarship in the social sciences and economic history." He critiqued the book for its reliance on utilitarianism due to its practical difficulties, and for not convincingly demonstrating that it was the Enlightenment that caused the trends Pinker identifies.

=== Negative ===
Kirkus Reviews called it "overstuffed", and noted though Pinker is progressive, "the academically orthodox will find him an apostate". The Guardian and The Financial Times dismissed Pinker's contention that the left is partly to blame for anti-reason rhetoric and objected to Pinker's criticism of groups such as postmodernists, de-growth environmentalists, and people whom Pinker deems to be "social justice warriors". British philosopher John Gray criticized Pinker as promoting scientism and discussed historical examples of strong desire for human progress leading to the misuse of science for immoral policies. Gray also argued that Pinker had misunderstood Friedrich Nietzsche.

Some reviewers disagreed with Pinker's quantitative approach to assessing progress. Booklist stated that "(Pinker's) seemingly casual dismissal of ethics concerns surrounding the Tuskegee experiment is troubling to say the least." Pinker had written that the Tuskegee experiment "was patently unethical by today’s standards, though it’s often misreported to pile up the indictment," and when properly reported, "when the study began, it may even have been defensible by the standards of the day."

Political scientist Nicolas Guilhot sharply criticizes the book for what he sees as "finessed statistics" marshaled in service of preconceived conclusions, and for being "one inch deep". He concludes: "Much of what Pinker writes about the humanities would be a comical caricature if it did not represent a coherent ideological offensive that is reshaping higher education and research."

In the Los Angeles Review of Books, Stanford University historian Jessica Riskin summarizes the book as "a knot of Orwellian contradictions". She states that Pinker believes that skepticism is a negative influence on society, and objects that the very Enlightenment heroes Pinker praises, such as Immanuel Kant, David Hume, Denis Diderot and Adam Smith, were all advocates of skepticism. She concludes, "What we need in this time of political, environmental, and cultural crisis is precisely the value Pinker rejects but that his Enlightenment heroes embraced, whatever their differences of opinion on other matters: skepticism, and an attendant spirit of informed criticism."

Anthropologist and archeologist David Graeber and David Wengrow, respectively, criticized Pinker as a "modern psychologist making it up as he goes along," citing archeological evidence that falsify his claims, as well as criticizing his statistical analysis as wrongheaded.

Enlightenment historian David Bell claimed that Pinker's characterization of the Enlightenment was problematic and oversimplified. Bell criticized his monolithic characterization of the historical movement, as well as his lack of engagement with Rousseau. Bell also notes Pinker's citation of sources he believes are unreliable, such as his extensive references to The Idea of Decline in Western History by Arthur Herman, whom he describes as a far-right author.

Susan D. Healy criticizes Steven Pinker's assertion that enlightenment have made humans today much more intelligent than our ancestors with the same biological hardwiring on evolutionary grounds, arguing that it would have been a waste of nutrients which evolution would have selected against for our ancestors to have capacity for vastly more intelligence than they could use in their environment. It is cited by Healy that the brain capacity of different animals is predicted by the food that was available to their ancestors when their biological hardwiring evolved, not by changes of living standards too recent to have shaped them through natural selection. The apparent rise in IQ scores is explained by Healy as an artifact of forced rules that demand that IQ tests have normally distributed outcomes and systematically leave out tests that give outcomes that are not normally distributed, a bias that is argued to be a purely negative influence on the scientific usefulness of the results comparable to introducing a noise generator and leaving out signal bands.

Deborah Deliyannis, Hendrik Dey and Paolo Squatriti argue that Steven Pinker's claims that people today are better at inventing than people were in the past and that today's society is better at helping potential inventors ignore the increase in population, citing that there were so many inventions made in antiquity and medieval times despite the much lower population that invention rates per capita were actually at least as high as they are today, if not higher. This is cited as an argument not only against the claim that education have increased people's ability to invent, but also against the claim that creative people who would be diagnosed with various neuropsychiatric diagnoses today get better help that helps them invent today and were mistreated so badly it prevented them from inventing in the past when they were not diagnosed. The claim that free enterprise promoted invention that was suppressed by feudal guilds, slavery and serfdom is criticized on the same grounds.
