= Inferior (book) =

2017 book by Angela Saini

- First edition (US)
- Author: Angela Saini
- Published: 30 May 2017
- Publisher: Fourth Estate Books (UK); Beacon Press (US)
- Publication place: United Kingdom
- ISBN: 978-0-8070-7170-0 (Hardcover)

Inferior: How Science Got Women Wrong and the New Research That's Rewriting the Story is a 2017 book by science journalist Angela Saini. The book discusses the effect of sexism on scientific research, and how that sexism influences social beliefs.

Inferior was launched in June 2017 at the Royal Academy of Engineering. The book was published by Beacon Press in the United States and Fourth Estate Books in the United Kingdom.

== Reception ==
According to journalist Chantal Da Silva of The Independent, Angela Saini "paints a disturbing picture of just how deeply sexist notions have been woven into the fabric of scientific research" and concluded that her work "presents the rest of the scientific community with an important challenge: to acknowledge and correct a deep-rooted bias – and to help rewrite the role of women in the story of human evolution".

Science journalist Nicola Davis writing for The Guardian stated that Saini "discovers that many of society’s traditional beliefs about women are built on shaky ground" and that "Saini’s scrutiny of the stereotype of men as hunters, leaving women to tend hearth and home, is eye-opening".

Journalist Anjana Vaswani in the Ahmedabad Mirror wrote that Saini "exposes Charles Darwin's prejudices and how his views on a woman's place in society tinted, or rather tainted, his theories."

In a review by Chemistry World, journalist Jennifer Newton wrote that "Saini’s narrative is sharp, engaging and admirably tempered" "I cannot recommend it highly enough".

A month after its release, Inferior was recommended by Scientific American. It was a finalist in the Goodreads Choice Awards for "Best Science and Technology" in 2017 but ultimately lost to Astrophysics for People in a Hurry. Inferior was chosen as the Physics World "Book of the Year" for 2017 by the editor Tushna Commissariat who called it "[i]ntrepid, detailed [and] upbeat".

Egyptologist Julien Delhez, writing for the journal Evolution, Mind and Behaviour in 2019, criticized Inferior for being "imprecise", "hazy", stating that "[w]hile researchers often benefit from listening to those who disagree with them, innuendos and vague claims such as these will certainly not help". He also wrote that the book creates confusion that could potentially "seriously deteriorate the dialogue between the public and the scientific community", unless "evolutionary psychologists, personality researchers, and intelligence researchers take the time to respond to such critics [i.e. Saini]".

Psychologist Felipe Carvalho Novaes in the Portuguese journal Revista Psicologia Organizações e Trabalho, wrote that the book was well-written, but that it suffers from excessive biases and several contradictions. Novaes also recommended reading other books, such as The Sexual Paradox, so the reader could get different perspectives on the subject.

After the release of Inferior, Angela Saini was invited to speak at universities and schools around the country, in what became a "scientific feminist book tour".
