= The Sexual Paradox =

2008 book by psychologist Susan Pinker

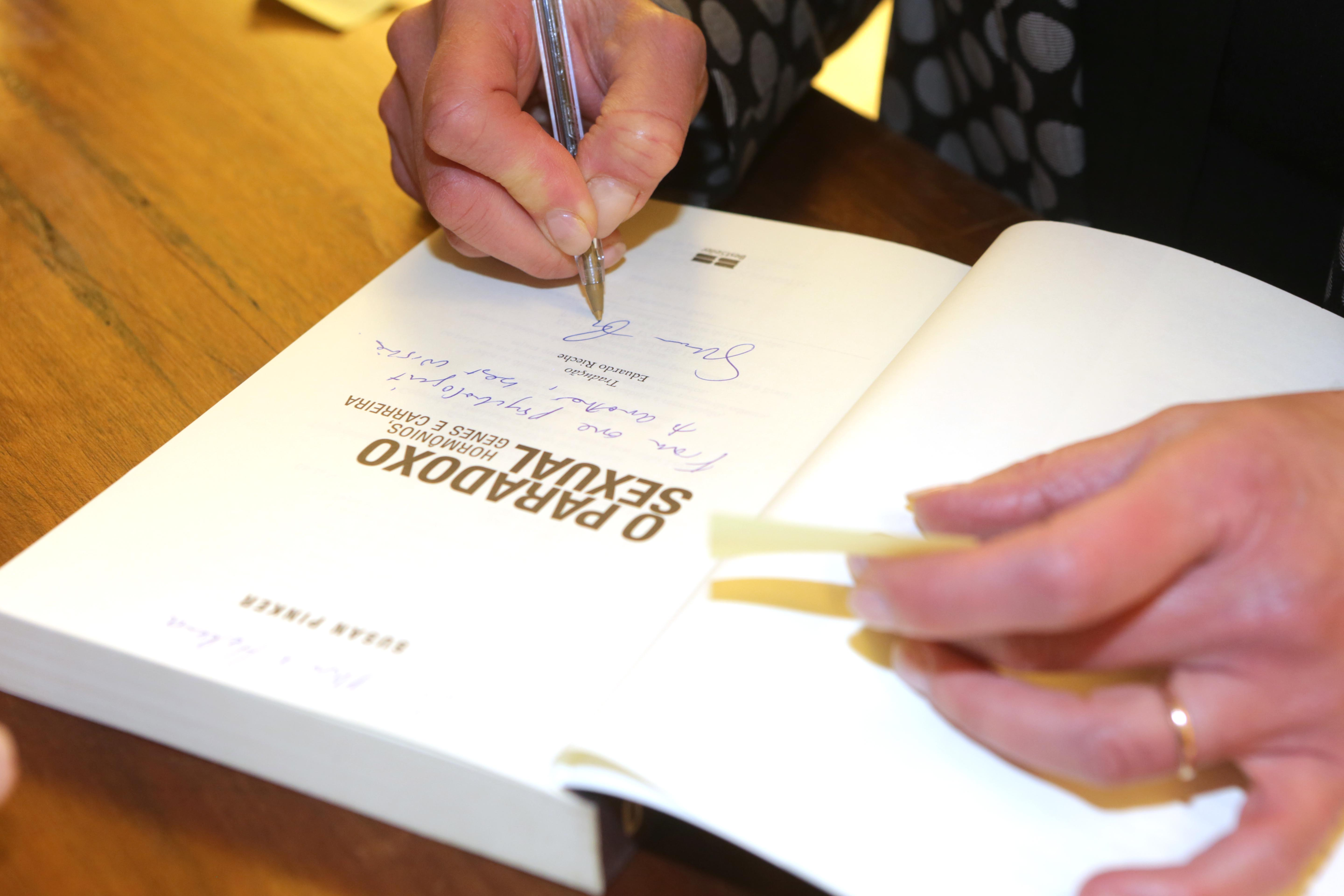
- Susan Pinker signing her book (2017).
- Author: Susan Pinker
- Language: English
- Publisher: Charles Scribner's Sons
- Publication date: 2008
- Publication place: United States
- Pages: 352
- ISBN: 978-0743284707

The Sexual Paradox is a book by Susan Pinker published by Scribner in 2008. Pinker is a psychologist and columnist for The Globe and Mail. The Sexual Paradox was 2009 winner of the American Psychological Association's annual William James Book Award, a New York Times "Editor's Choice", and one of the "Best Books" reviewed by the Evening Standard.

== Quotes ==
- "If you were to predict the future on the basis of school achievement alone ... the world would be a matriarchy." (Quoted in Emily Bazelon's New York Times review. Bazelon goes on to note: "And yet, of course, it is not. Once they move from school to work, men on average earn more money and run more shows. They particularly dominate in national government, the corporate boardroom and the science laboratory.")
- "The puzzle is why the idea of sex differences continues to be so controversial." (Quoted in Bazelon.)

== Reviews ==
- "We shouldn't wish the role of sex differences away because they're at odds with feminist dogma. But that doesn't mean we should settle for the reductionist version of the relevant science, even if the complexity doesn't make for as neat a package between hard covers." — Emily Bazelon, The New York Times.
- "Pinker throws out the question of why women may or may not be allowed to be equal to men and posits a different one: why on earth do men get to be the standard? Why should females have the goal of meeting the male standard? This in itself denigrates females.... Pinker dares to posit the idea that women don't have the same preferences as men and therefore, might actually choose different paths, not be forced into them by the patriarchy." — Rebecca L. Burch, Evolutionary Psychology.
- "[Pinker] delivers a well-referenced summary of the most up-to-date psychological research and social statistics in a cheerful style. The publicity the book has received, however, derives less from its style than its message." — Anne Campbell, New Scientist.

== See also ==
- Steven Pinker
- The Blank Slate

== Bibliography ==
- Pinker, Susan. The Sexual Paradox: Extreme Men, Gifted Women and the Real Gender Gap. Scribner, 2008.

reviews

- Bazelon, Emily. "Hormones, Genes and the Corner Office". Sunday Book Review. The New York Times March 9, 2008.
- Burch, Rebecca L. (2010). "Things Are Not What They Seem: A Review of Susan Pinker, The Sexual Paradox". Evolutionary Psychology. 8: 119–121. doi:10.1177/147470491000800112. PMC 10426901.
- Campbell, Anne. Review for New Scientist 5 April 2008.
