= Susan Pinker =

Canadian psychologist and social scientist (born 1957)

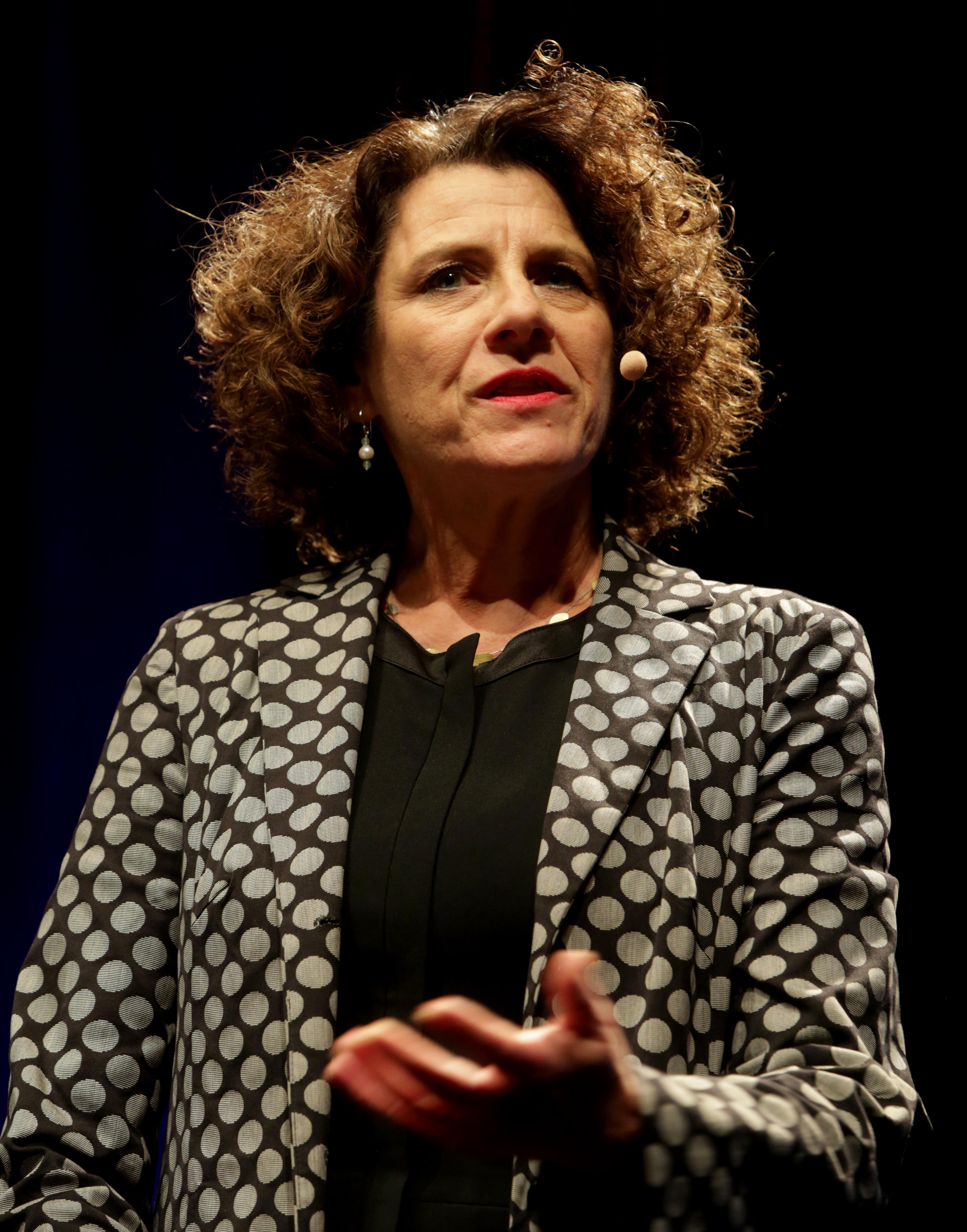
- Pinker in 2017
- Born: 1957 (age 68–69); Montreal, Quebec, Canada
- Education: McGill University (BA); University of Waterloo (MASc)
- Known for: The Sexual Paradox (2008)
- Relatives: Steven Pinker (brother)
- Awards: William James Prize (2010)
- Scientific career
- Fields: Clinical psychology, developmental psychology
- Workplaces: Dawson College; McGill University

Susan Pinker is a Canadian psychologist, author, and social science columnist for The Wall Street Journal. She is a former weekly columnist for The Globe and Mail, and has also written for The New York Times, The Guardian, and The Times of London. Her first book, The Sexual Paradox, was awarded the William James Book Award in 2010 and was published in 17 countries. Her book The Village Effect was a Canadian bestseller and an Apple 2014 nonfiction best pick. Her work has been featured in The Economist, The Financial Times, and Der Spiegel.

== Career ==
Pinker spent 25 years in clinical practice and teaching psychology, first at Dawson College, then at McGill University.

Pinker writes about new findings in behavioral science in the Mind and Matter column, which appears Saturdays in the Wall Street Journal. Her Globe and Mail columns, Problem Solving and the Business Brain, applied the latest evidence from the fields of neuroscience, behavioral economics and social psychology to the world of business. They appeared weekly in The Globe and Mail from 2003 to 2011.

Pinker's book, The Sexual Paradox: Men, Women and the Real Gender Gap, is focused on how sex differences play out in the workplace. By comparing fragile boys who later succeed, with high achieving women who opt out, Pinker turns several assumptions upside down: that the sexes are biologically equivalent, that smarts are all it takes to succeed and that men and women have identical interests and goals. After decades of women's educational coups and rising through the ranks, men still outnumber women in business, physical science, law, engineering, and politics. In explaining this ratio, Pinker's stance is that discrimination plays just a small part. If the majority of children with school and behavioral problems are boys, then why do so many overcome early obstacles, while rafts of high achieving women choose jobs that pay less or opt out at pivotal moments in their careers?

The Village Effect: How Face-To-Face Contact Can Make Us Healthier, Happier and Smarter, combines narrative nonfiction with science reporting to explore how our social bonds, face-to-face contact, and networks affect our thinking, learning, happiness, resilience and longevity. It was published by Random House in Canada, Spiegel and Grau in the United States, Atlantic Books in the United Kingdom, Charactery in Poland, Book21 in Korea, Cheers Media in China, and Batik Yayincilik in Turkey. It was selected as an Apple Nonfiction "Best Pick" in 2014.

== Awards ==
Her 2008 book, The Sexual Paradox, was awarded the William James Book Award by the American Psychological Association in 2009. Her 2014 book, The Village Effect, was selected as an Apple Nonfiction Best Pick in 2014.

In 2014, Susan was given the Holden Award by the International Society for Intelligence Research. In 2015 she was a Poynter Fellow in Journalism at Yale University.

Her writing has also been recognized in awards from the Canadian Medical Association (2000), the Professional Writing Association of Canada (2002, 2010), and she has been nominated for the John Alexander Media Award (2000), the Aventis Pasteur Medal for Excellence in Health Research Journalism (1999), the YWCA Woman of Distinction Award (2007), and the BC National Award for Canadian Non-Fiction (2009).

== Personal life ==
Pinker is married and has three children. She lives in Montreal. She is Jewish and attends Congregation Dorshei Emet in Hampstead, Quebec. She is the sister of evolutionary psychologist Steven Pinker.
