= The Stuff of Thought =

2007 book by Steven Pinker

The Stuff of Thought: Language As a Window Into Human Nature
- Cover of the first edition
- Author: Steven Pinker
- Language: English
- Subject: Philosophy
- Publisher: Penguin Group (Viking Press)
- Publication date: 2007
- Publication place: United States
- Media type: Print
- Pages: 499
- ISBN: 978-0-670-06327-7
- OCLC: 154308853
- Dewey Decimal: 401 22
- LC Class: P107 .P548 2007

The Stuff of Thought (2007) is Steven Pinker's fifth science book in the collection of trilogies that explore language, the mind, and the human nature. It analyses language as a cognitive tool, and explores the deep complex relationship between an individual's perception of the world and different aspects of languages, such as words, grammar, and metaphors.

== Introduction ==
Pinker notes that language provides a window into human nature, and that analyzing language can reveal what people are thinking and feeling. He asserts that language must do two things:

1. convey a message to an audience, and
2. negotiate the social relationship between the speaker and the audience.

He says language functions at these two levels at all times. For example, a common-place statement such as "If you could pass the salt, that would be great" functions both as a request (though formally not a request) and as a means of being polite or non-offensive (through not directing the audience to overt demands). Pinker says of this example:

It's become so common that we don't even notice that it is a philosophical rumination rather than a direct imperative. It's a bit of a social dilemma. On the one hand, you do want the salt. On the other hand, you don't want to boss people around lightly. So you split the difference by saying something that literally makes no sense while also conveying the message that you're not treating them like some kind of flunky.

Through this lens, Pinker asks questions such as "What does the peculiar syntax of swearing tell us about ourselves?" Or put another way, "Just what does the 'fuck' in 'fuck you' actually mean?", - as discussed in the chapter The Seven Words You Can't Say on Television. The arguments contained within ride on the backs of his previous works, which paint human nature as having "distinct and universal properties, some of which are innate – determined at birth by genes rather than shaped primarily by environment."

== Summary ==
=== Chapter 1: Words and Words ===
Pinker explores the idea that language boundaries are uncertain, and that even the slightest changes in language can change individuals' perceptions of the world. He talks about the infamous event which happened on September 11, 2001. There was a linguistic debate whether if 9/11 should be considered as one event, or two separate ones as both twin towers of the World Trade Center in New York City crashed down at similar times.

Pinker points out that there are two ways to view the September 11 attacks: It was a single, coordinated terrorist attack that provoked the events afterwards, or whether it was two separate events separated by the north and south tower. The distinction was important in the court because if 9/11 was considered a single event, Larry Silverstein, the owner of the twin towers, would have been insured for only up to $3.5 billion. He introduces a linguistic term: "Semantics", which is about the relation of words to thoughts, but it is also about the relation of words to other human concerns. Similarity, there are other concepts that are introduced in this chapter: how a name points to an entity in this world, and other scenarios (Eg. baby-naming, acronyms).

== See also ==
- Computational theory of mind
- Sociobiology
- Evolutionary psychology
- Imprinting
- Noam Chomsky
- Douglas Hofstadter
- Social semiotics
- Immanuel Kant
