= The Sense of Style =

2014 book by Steven Pinker

- Author: Steven Pinker
- Language: English
- Published: 2014 (Penguin Books)
- Publication place: United States of America
- ISBN: 9780670025855
- OCLC: 870919633

The Sense of Style: The Thinking Person's Guide to Writing in the 21st Century is a 2014 English style guide written by cognitive scientist, linguist and popular science author Steven Pinker. Building upon earlier guides, such as Strunk & White's The Elements of Style and Fowler's A Dictionary of Modern English Usage, it applies science to the process of writing, and explains its prescriptions by citing studies in related fields – e.g., grammatical phenomena, mental dynamics, and memory load – as well as history and criticism, to "distinguish the rules that enhance clarity, grace, and emotional resonance from those that are based on myths and misunderstandings".

Pinker's prescriptions combine data from ballots given to the Usage Panel of the American Heritage Dictionary, the usage notes of several dictionaries and style guides, the historical analyses in Merriam–Webster's Dictionary of English Usage, the meta-analysis in Roy H. Copperud's American Usage and Style: The Consensus, and views from modern linguistics represented in The Cambridge Grammar of the English Language and the blog Language Log.

== Reception ==
The Sense of Style won Plain English Campaign's International Award for 2014, and was ranked among the best books of 2014 by The Economist, The Sunday Times, and Amazon. It received mainly positive reviews from several major publications, including The New York Times, Scientific American, and The Washington Post. Negative reviews appeared in The New Yorker and The Telegraph, which stated that Pinker "doesn't have anything new to say" and which criticized Pinker for allegedly "logrolling" in his choice of which authors to quote.
