= Superior: The Return of Race Science =

2019 book by Angela Saini on scientific racism

- First edition
- Author: Angela Saini
- Language: English
- Subject: Race, scientific racism
- Genre: Essay
- Publisher: Beacon Press
- Publication date: 2019-05-21
- Pages: 256
- ISBN: 978-0-8070-7691-0

Superior: The Return of Race Science is a non-fiction book by Angela Saini published in 2019. Built around interviews with experts, the scientific consensus, and the author's analysis, it argues that some fields of biology are still influenced by the discredited scientific racism theories of the 19th century.

== Summary ==
With Superior, Saini draws upon her own childhood in a white neighbourhood of London. The racial discrimination she faced at the time pushed her towards a style of journalism that seeks to highlight injustice. Her renewed interest in the genetics of race was stirred by the exploitation by the white supremacy movement of research that seems to point to genetically distinct racial groupings.

Saini first recounts the history of scientific racism, from its origins of systematic classification of humans according to physical appearance and alleged racially-based personality traits, an approach adopted by a list of scientists that includes Linnaeus, Darwin and Huxley. She goes on to the acceptance of these theories by 20th-century anthropology and biology, and to their integration into political doctrines under the Nazi regime. She traces the way racial categories have changed over a fairly short period of time, revealing them as social constructs.

Saini argues that despite deliberate efforts to discredit this approach in the post-war period, the pseudo-scientific claim that some varieties of Homo sapiens are inherently superior (or more evolved) than others has not only survived, but is making a comeback. Having served the ideologies of the slave trade, race-based immigration and the Holocaust in the past, scientific racism is today enlisted in the cause of white supremacy.

While acknowledging that today's scientists who look for expressions of the concept of race in biology are not the equivalent of their 19th-century peers, Saini questions whether this line of inquiry can produce any useful findings. She argues a focus on race or ethnicity in public health and medicine can blind researchers to environmental causes that have already been proven to affect health outcomes, such as socioeconomic conditions. By rehashing the idea that the concept of race corresponds to actual genetic differences, they also feed the re-emergence of the white nationalist movement.

== Critical reception ==
In Nature, Robin Nelson argues the book "is perhaps best understood as continuing in a tradition of groundbreaking work that contextualizes the deep and problematic history of race science", along with works by Dorothy Roberts and Alondra Nelson. She notes the author uses loaded terms such as "political correctness" and "identity politics" without acknowledging those terms are often used in a pejorative manner, making her intention unclear.

In Slate, Tim Requarth calls the book "exceptional and damning" and says it will force scientists to examine how a society's culture affects their scientific judgment.

Writing for the Center for Genetics and Society, Peter Shanks calls Saini "an author to watch". He believes the book is "an invaluable resource, and my only real criticism is that the one-word title may give some the false impression that Saini endorses the idea that some groups are superior."

In the Financial Times, Clive Cookson said the book is a "brilliant analysis of race science past and present". While Cookson is uncomfortable with what he perceives as an invitation to avoid researching links between genetics and intelligence, he still considers Superior "a thought-provoking combination of science, social history and modern politics."

== See also ==
- Race and intelligence
- Mankind Quarterly
