= Geoffrey Sampson =

British academic (born 1944)

- Born: 1944 (age 81–82); Broxbourne, England, United Kingdom
- Known for: The 'Language Instinct' Debate
- Scientific career
- Fields: Linguistics, Computing, Economics
- Workplaces: London School of Economics; University of Lancaster; University of Leeds; University of Sussex

Geoffrey Sampson (born 1944) is Professor of Natural Language Computing in the Department of Informatics, University of Sussex. He produces annotation standards for compiling corpora (databases) of ordinary usage of the English language. His work has been applied in automatic language-understanding software, and in writing-skills training. He has also analysed Ronald Coase's "theory of the firm" and the economic and political implications of e-business.

== Career ==
Sampson is a Fellow of the Royal Society of Arts, the British Computer Society and the Higher Education Academy. He is also a Chartered Information Technology Professional. He holds three MA degrees, one each from Cambridge, Yale, and Oxford. After graduating from St. John's College, Cambridge, he went on to Yale, conducting research in the Linguistics and Engineering & Applied Science departments. He was awarded a doctorate by Cambridge under the special regulations; his published work was deemed to comprise "a significant contribution to scholarship".

His academic career has included work in Asian languages, linguistics, and computing, with side interests in philosophy, and political and economic thought. He lectured at the London School of Economics, the University of Lancaster and the University of Leeds before moving to Sussex in 1991.

Sampson is widely known for academic papers criticising the linguistic nativist movement, including the arguments of proponents such as Noam Chomsky, Jerry Fodor, and Steven Pinker. Sampson critically engaged with Pinker's 1994 book The Language Instinct, in his own book The 'Language Instinct' Debate, the first edition of which, published in 1997, was entitled Educating Eve.

== Political activities ==
Sampson is politically active and was elected to Wealden District Council in 2001, serving until 2002 with the local Conservative Party branch. He resigned this position after he was criticised by Labour Party and Liberal Democrat ministers and councillors for publishing on his website an article, There's Nothing Wrong With Racism (Except the Name), containing a number of racist claims. The outcome was subsequently endorsed by Conservative Central Office as "in the best interests of all concerned ...the Conservative party is opposed to all forms of racial discrimination". Some time later he left the Conservative Party and in 2006 joined the United Kingdom Independence Party.

== Selection of publications ==
Monographs

- The Form of Language (Weidenfeld & Nicolson, 1975)
- Liberty and Language (Oxford, 1979)
- Making Sense (Oxford, 1980)
- Schools of Linguistics: Competition and Evolution (Hutchinson, 1980)
- Writing Systems (Anchor Brenton Ltd., 1985)
- Educating Eve: The 'Language Instinct' Debate (Continuum, 1997)
- Empirical Linguistics (Continuum, 2001)

Essays

- "From central embedding to corpus linguistics" in Using Corpora for Language Research (Longman, 1996)

Articles

- "What was transformational grammar?" Lingua 48 (1979): 355–78.
- "Popperian language-acquisition undefeated". British Journal for the Philosophy of Science 31 (1980): 63–67.
- Geoffrey Sampson (1 January 1989). "How Fully Does a Machine-Usable Dictionary Cover English Text?". Digital Scholarship in the Humanities. 4 (1): 29–35. doi:10.1093/llc/4.1.29. ISSN 0268-1145. Wikidata Q115688673.
- "Depth in English grammar". Journal of Linguistics 33 (1997): 131–51.
- "Grammatical depth: a rejoinder". Computational Linguistics 25 (1999): xx–xx.
- "Briefly noted – English for the computer: the SUSANNE corpus and analytic scheme". Computational Linguistics 28 (2002): xx–xx.
- "Word frequency distributions". Computational Linguistics 28 (2002): xx–xx.
- "The myth of diminishing firms". Communications of the ACM 46 (2003): xx–xx.
- "A test of the leaf-ancestor metric for parse accuracy" Natural Language Engineering 9 (2003): xx–xx. [with Anna Babarczy]
- "Definitional, personal, and mechanical constraints on part of speech annotation performance". Natural Language Engineering 12 (2006): xx–xx. [with Anna Babarczy and John Carroll (not John M Carroll)]

Reviews

- Steven Pinker, Words and Rules for Times Higher Education Supplement 12 May (2000): 22–23.
