= Phonetic notation of the American Heritage Dictionary =

The American Heritage Dictionary of the English Language (abbreviated AHD) uses a phonetic notation based on the Latin alphabet to transcribe the pronunciation of spoken English. It and similar respelling systems, such as those used by the Merriam-Webster and Random House dictionaries, are familiar to US schoolchildren.

The following tables show the AHD representations of English phonemes, along with the IPA equivalents as used on Wikipedia.

== Vowels ==
In general, long vowels are marked with a macron, and short vowels with a breve. A circumflex may also be used to indicate a pre-rhotic vowel. Usage of other symbols vary.

| AHD | IPA | Example |
|---|---|---|
| ă | æ | bat |
| ā | eɪ | bait |
| âr | ɛər | bear |
| ä | ɑː | father |
| ĕ | ɛ | bet |
| ē | iː | beat |
| ĭ | ɪ | bit |
| ī | aɪ | bite |
| îr | ɪər | beer |
| ŏ | ɒ | bot |
| ō | oʊ | boat |
| ô | ɔː | bought |
| ôr | ɔːr | north |
| oi | ɔɪ | boy |
| o͝o | ʊ | book |
| o͞o | uː | boot |
| ou | aʊ | bout |
| ŭ | ʌ | butt |
| ûr | ɜːr | bird |
| ə | ə | about |
| ər | ər | butter |
Foreign
| œ | ø | French feu, German schön |
| œ | œ | French œuf, German zwölf |
| ü | y | French tu, German über |
| ◌N | ◌̃ | French bon |

== Consonants ==
| AHD | IPA | Example |
|---|---|---|
| b | b | buy |
| ch | tʃ | China |
| d | d | dye |
| f | f | fight |
| g | ɡ | guy |
| h | h | high |
| hw | hw | why |
| j | dʒ | jive |
| k | k | kite |
| l | l | lie |
| l | əl | bottle |
| m | m | my |
| n | n | nigh |
| n | ən | button |
| ng | ŋ | sing |
| p | p | pie |
| r | r | rye |
| s | s | sigh |
| sh | ʃ | shy |
| t | t | tie |
| th | θ | thigh |
| th | ð | thy |
| v | v | vie |
| w | w | wide |
| y | j | yacht |
| z | z | zoo |
| zh | ʒ | vision |
| əm | əm | rhythm |
Foreign
| KH | ç | German ich |
| KH | x | German ach, Scottish loch |

== Suprasegmentals ==
Stress is indicated by a prime character following stressed syllables. The character is in boldface when it indicates primary stress.

| AHD | IPA | Description |
|---|---|---|
| ◌'′' | ˈ◌ | Primary stress |
| ◌′ | ˌ◌ | Secondary stress |
| - | . | Syllable division (omitted after stressed syllables) |

== See also ==
- Pronunciation respelling for English
- International Phonetic Alphabet (IPA)
