= Journal of Cognitive Neuroscience =

- Discipline: Cognitive neuroscience
- Language: English
- Edited by: Bradley R. Postle

Publication details
- History: 1989–present
- Publisher: MIT Press and the Cognitive Neuroscience Society (United States)
- Frequency: Monthly
- Impact factor: 3.468 (2017)

Standard abbreviations
- ISO 4: J. Cogn. Neurosci.

Indexing
- ISSN: 0898-929X (print); 1530-8898 (web)
- LCCN: 89656189
- OCLC no.: 38911348

Links
- Journal homepage; Online access

The Journal of Cognitive Neuroscience is a monthly peer-reviewed academic journal covering cognitive neuroscience. It aims for a cross-discipline approach, covering research in neuroscience, neuropsychology, cognitive psychology, neurobiology, linguistics, computer science, and philosophy. The journal is published by the MIT Press and the Cognitive Neuroscience Society and the editor-in-chief is Bradley R. Postle (University of Wisconsin–Madison).

== Abstracting and indexing ==
The journal is abstracted and indexed in:

- Current Contents/Life Sciences
- EBSCO databases
- Ei Compendex
- Elsevier Biobase
- Embase
- FRANCIS
- Index Medicus/MEDLINE/PubMed
- InfoTrac
- Inspec
- ProQuest databases
- PsycINFO
- Science Citation Index
- Scopus
- Social Sciences Citation Index

According to the Journal Citation Reports, the journal has a 2020 impact factor of 3.225.
