= The American Heritage Dictionary of the English Language =

Collection of English words and their meanings, published by HarperCollins

First edition

The American Heritage Dictionary of the English Language (AHD) is a dictionary of American English published by HarperCollins. As of 2025 it is in its fifth edition.

Before HarperCollins acquired certain business lines from Houghton Mifflin Harcourt in 2022, the family of American Heritage dictionaries had long been published by Houghton Mifflin Harcourt and its predecessor Houghton Mifflin. The first edition appeared in 1969, an outgrowth of the editorial effort for Houghton Mifflin's American Heritage brand of history books and journals. The dictionary's creation was spurred by the controversy during the 1960s over the perceived permissiveness of the Webster's Third New International Dictionary (1961). A college dictionary followed several years later. The main dictionary became the flagship title as the brand grew into a family of various dictionaries, a dictionary-thesaurus combination, and a usage guide.

== History ==
James Parton (1912–2001), grandson of English-born American biographer James Parton (1822–1891), was the founder, publisher and co-owner of the magazines American Heritage and Horizon, and was dismayed by what he saw as the excessive permissiveness of Webster's Third published in 1961. (Webster's Third was widely claimed to present entries without labels such as "nonstandard" or "informal"; in fact, the dictionary did apply labels "slang", "substandard" and "nonstandard", though critics argued these were used too sparingly and without sufficient disapproval and discontinued older labels such as "improper" and "illiterate".) Parton tried to buy the G. and C. Merriam Company so that he could undo the changes. When that failed, he contracted with Houghton to publish a new dictionary. The AHD was edited by William Morris and relied on a panel of 105 prominent writers and speakers, selected for their linguistic conservatism. However, Morris was inconsistent in applying the panel's guidance, frequently overriding it with his own editorial judgment.

== Linguistics ==
The AHD broke ground among dictionaries by using corpus linguistics for compiling word frequencies and other information.

Citations were based on a million-word, three-line citation database prepared by Brown University linguist Henry Kučera.

== Usage panel ==
For expert consultation on words or constructions whose usage was controversial or problematic, the American Heritage Dictionary relied on the advice of a usage panel. In its final form, the panel comprised nearly 200 prominent members of professions whose work demanded sensitivity to language. Former members of the usage panel include novelists (Isaac Asimov, Barbara Kingsolver, David Foster Wallace and Eudora Welty), poets (Rita Dove, Galway Kinnell, Mary Oliver and Robert Pinsky), playwrights (Terrence McNally and Marsha Norman), journalists (Liane Hansen and Susan Stamberg), literary critics (Harold Bloom), columnists and commentators (William F. Buckley Jr. and Robert J. Samuelson), linguists and cognitive scientists (Anne Curzan, Steven Pinker and Calvert Watkins) and humorists (Garrison Keillor, David Sedaris and Alison Bechdel). Pinker, author of the style guide The Sense of Style, was its final chair.

The members of the panel were sent regular ballots asking about matters of usage; the completed ballots were returned and tabulated, and the results formed the basis for special usage notes appended to the relevant dictionary entries. In many cases, these notes not only reported the percentage of panelists who considered a given usage or construction to be acceptable, but would also report the results from balloting of the same question in past decades, to give a clearer sense of how the language changes over time.

Houghton Mifflin dissolved the usage panel on February 1, 2018, citing the decline in demand for print dictionaries.

== Illustrations ==
The AHD is also somewhat innovative in its liberal use of photographic illustrations, which at the time was highly unusual for general reference dictionaries, many of which went largely or completely unillustrated. It also has an unusually large number of biographical entries for notable persons.

== First edition ==
When the first edition appeared in 1969, it was praised for its Indo-European etymologies. In addition to the normally expected etymologies, which for instance trace the word ambiguous to a Proto-Indo-European root ag-, meaning "to drive", the dictionary includes an "Indo-European Roots Appendix", which begins with a seven-page article by Professor Calvert Watkins entitled "Indo-European and the Indo-Europeans". The appendix also contains a 46-page listing of Indo-European roots, wherein each of the approximately one thousand entries presents the Modern English words that are understood to have evolved from that root. These entries might be called "reverse etymologies": the ag- entry there, for instance, lists 49 terms derived from it, words as diverse as agent, essay, purge, stratagem, ambassador, axiom, and pellagra, along with information about varying routes through intermediate transformations on the way to the contemporary words.

The book included "vulgar" words, a decision that attracted not only criticism in the press, but some book bans as well.

A compact American Heritage College Dictionary was first released in 1974.

== Later editions ==
The first edition's concise successor, The American Heritage Dictionary, Second College Edition, was published in 1982 (without a larger-format version). It omitted the Indo-European etymologies, but they were reintroduced in the third full edition, published in 1992. The third edition was also a departure for the publisher because it was developed in a database, which facilitated the use of the linguistic data for other applications, such as electronic dictionaries. The third edition included over 350,000 entries and meanings.

The fourth edition (2000, reissued in 2006) added an appendix of Semitic language etymological roots, and included color illustrations, and was also available with a CD-ROM edition in some versions. This revision was larger than a typical desk dictionary but smaller than Webster's Third New International Dictionary or the unabridged Random House Dictionary of the English Language. A lower-priced college edition, also the fourth, was issued in black-and-white printing and with fewer illustrations, in 2002 (reprinted in 2007 and 2010).

The fifth and most recent full edition was published in November 2011, with new printings in 2012 and 2016 and a 50th Anniversary Printing in 2018, which the publisher states is a "comprehensive update" of the 2011 edition, containing "... [t]housands of revisions to definitions and etymologies, 150 new words and senses, and new usage advice ...."

The various printings of the 5th edition are available in hardcover and, with reduced print size and smaller page count, trade paperback form. The 5th edition dropped several of the supplementary features of the fourth edition, and is not available with a disc-based electronic version. The university-student version was renamed The American Heritage College Writer's Dictionary in 2013, and stripped of biographical and geographical entries to make room for more vocabulary while simultaneously reducing the number of pages compared to the fourth college edition.

The AHD inserts minor revisions (such as a biographical entry, with photograph, for each newly elected U.S. president) in successive printings of any given edition.

Supporting volumes have been issued, including The American Heritage Book of English Usage, The American Heritage Dictionary of Indo-European Roots, The American Heritage Abbreviations Dictionary, The American Heritage Dictionary of Idioms, The American Heritage Thesaurus in various sizes; usage dictionaries of special vocabulary such as The American Heritage Science Dictionary, The American Heritage Medical Dictionary and The American Heritage Dictionary of Business Terms; plus special dictionary editions for children, high-school students, and English-language learners. The American Heritage brand is also used for a series of American history books.

== See also ==
- List of dictionaries by number of words
- Phonetic notation of the American Heritage Dictionary
