= Rationality (book) =

2021 nonfiction book by Steven Pinker

Rationality: What It Is, Why It Seems Scarce, Why It Matters
- First edition cover
- Author: Steven Pinker
- Language: English
- Subject: Rationality
- Publisher: Viking
- Publication date: September 28, 2021
- Publication place: United States
- Pages: 432
- ISBN: 978-0-525-56199-6
- OCLC: 1237806678
- Dewey Decimal: 153.4/2
- LC Class: BF441 .P56 2021

Rationality: What It Is, Why It Seems Scarce, Why It Matters is a 2021 book written by Canadian-American cognitive scientist Steven Pinker. The book was published on September 28, 2021, by the Viking imprint of Penguin Random House.

It argues that rationality is a key driver of moral and social progress, and it attempts to resolve the apparent conflict between scientific progress and increasing levels of disinformation. Pinker explains several concepts underlying rationality, including from the fields of logic, probability theory, statistics, and social choice.

== Reception ==
The book debuted at number nine on The New York Times nonfiction best-seller list for the week ending October 2, 2021.

In its starred review, Publishers Weekly wrote, "He manages to be scrupulously rigorous yet steadily accessible and entertaining." To Andrew Anthony on The Guardian, Pinker, not a "dry and humourless slave to rational thought", "knows that what we find funny is often nothing more than clever inversions of logic". Kirkus Reviews wrote, "The author can be heady and geeky, but seldom to the point that his discussions shade off into inaccessibility."

On The New York Times, Jennifer Szalai commented that "The trouble arrives when he [Pinker] tries to gussy up his psychologist's hat with his more elaborate public intellectual's attire", while Anthony Gottlieb noted Pinker's tendencies to "exaggerate the popularity of ill-founded beliefs" and to devote "plenty of space to advocating rationality, which the authors of similar works have not found necessary to do, perhaps because anybody who chooses to read about rationality is probably already in favor of it."
