= The Language Instinct =

1994 book by Steven Pinker

The Language Instinct: How the Mind Creates Language
- Cover of the first edition
- Author: Steven Pinker
- Language: English
- Subject: Psycholinguistics, evolutionary psychology, evolutionary psychology of language, linguistics
- Published: 1994 (William Morrow and Company)
- Publication place: United States
- Media type: Print
- Pages: 483
- ISBN: 0-688-12141-1

The Language Instinct: How the Mind Creates Language is a 1994 book by Steven Pinker, written for a general audience. Pinker argues that humans are born with an innate capacity for language. He deals sympathetically with Noam Chomsky's claim that all human language shows evidence of a universal grammar, but dissents from Chomsky's skepticism that evolutionary theory can explain the human language instinct.

== Thesis ==
Pinker criticizes a number of common ideas about language, for example that children must be taught to use it, that most people's grammar is poor, that the quality of language is steadily declining, that the kind of linguistic facilities that a language provides (for example, some languages have words to describe light and dark, but no words for colors) has a heavy influence on a person's possible range of thoughts (the Sapir–Whorf hypothesis), and that nonhuman animals have been taught language (see Great ape language). Pinker sees language as an ability unique to humans, produced by evolution to solve the specific problem of communication among social hunter-gatherers. He compares language to other species' specialized adaptations such as spiders' web-weaving or beavers' dam-building behavior, calling all three "instincts".

By calling language an instinct, Pinker means that it is not a human invention in the sense that metalworking and even writing are. While only some human cultures possess these technologies, all cultures possess language. As further evidence for the universality of language, Pinker—mainly relying on the work of Derek Bickerton—notes that children spontaneously invent a consistent grammatical speech (a creole) even if they grow up among a mixed-culture population speaking an informal trade pidgin with no consistent rules. Deaf babies "babble" with their hands as others normally do with voice, and spontaneously invent sign languages with true grammar rather than a crude "me Tarzan, you Jane" pointing system. Language (speech) also develops in the absence of formal instruction or active attempts by parents to correct children's grammar. These signs suggest that rather than being a human invention, language is an innate human ability. Pinker also distinguishes language from humans' general reasoning ability, emphasizing that it is not simply a mark of advanced intelligence but rather a specialized "mental module". He distinguishes the linguist's notion of grammar, such as the placement of adjectives, from formal rules such as those in the American English writing style guide. He argues that because rules like "a preposition is not a proper word to end a sentence with" must be explicitly taught, they are irrelevant to actual communication and should be ignored.

Pinker attempts to trace the outlines of the language instinct by citing his own studies of language acquisition in children, and the works of many other linguists and psychologists in multiple fields, as well as numerous examples from popular culture. He notes, for instance, that specific types of brain damage cause specific impairments of language such as Broca's aphasia or Wernicke's aphasia, that specific types of grammatical construction are especially hard to understand, and that there seems to be a critical period in childhood for language development just as there is a critical period for vision development in cats. Much of the book refers to Chomsky's concept of a universal grammar, a meta-grammar into which all human languages fit. Pinker explains that a universal grammar represents specific structures in the human brain that recognize the general rules of other humans' speech, such as whether the local language places adjectives before or after nouns, and begin a specialized and very rapid learning process not explainable as reasoning from first principles or pure logic. This learning machinery exists only during a specific critical period of childhood and is then disassembled for thrift, freeing resources in an energy-hungry brain.

== Reception ==
Pinker's assumptions about the innateness of language have been challenged; English linguist Geoffrey Sampson argues that there is no such thing as a language instinct; however, he acknowledges that Pinker represents a widely held view of language acquisition.

Richard Webster writes in Why Freud Was Wrong (1995), and concludes that Pinker argues cogently that the human capacity for language is part of the genetic endowment associated with the evolution through natural selection of specialised neural networks within the brain, and that its attack on the 'standard social science model' of human nature is effective. Webster accepts Pinker's argument that, for ideological motives, twentieth-century social scientists have minimized the extent to which human nature is influenced by genetics. However, Webster finds Pinker's speculation about other specialized neural networks that may have evolved within the human brain—such as "intuitive mechanics" and "intuitive biology"—to be questionable, and believes that there is a danger that they will be treated by others as science. Webster believes that such speculations strengthen supporters of extreme genetic determinism.

== Also see ==
- Educating Eve
