= Susan D. Healy =

Biologist specialist in bird behaviours

Susan D. Healy FRSE
- Occupation: professor of biology
- Employer: University of St. Andrews
- Known for: specialist in researching cognitive behaviour in animals, especially birds and the neural bases for this

Susan Denise Healy FRSE professor of biology at the University of St. Andrews, specialist in cognitive evolution and behavioural studies of birds (storing food, nesting, foraging) and understanding the neurological basis of this. She was elected as a Fellow of the Royal Society of Edinburgh in 2021.

== Research interests and selected publications ==
Healy had earlier studied the brain structure of one kind of bird, exhibiting certain behaviours, compared the nest building techniques of different birds, studied stress behaviour in albino rats of either sex, and how hummingbirds learn which flowers to choose as well as debating scientific methodology for studying cognition in animals. She has furthered her studies on the use of materials for nesting and its impact on birds' reproductive success, and noted how hummingbirds avoided flower locations where they had had poor rewards, as well as examining the disciplines used in research on animal behaviour, psychology or machine learning, and how to consider 'dexterity' across species from primates to birds to insects.

Her publications are listed by the University of St. Andrews. Healy has been on the editorial team of a number of academic journals: Animal Behaviour, Ethnology and Animal Cognition, and an invited speaker at international conferences. Her research has been funded by grants from BBSRC, Marie Curie Fellowships, and the Leverhulme Trust, amongst others. She recently won a European grant for £0.25m for NEURONest: Nest building in birds: cognitive, neural and molecular basis of an overlooked behaviour.

In 2021, Healy was made a Fellow of the Royal Society of Edinburgh.
