= The Blank Slate =

2002 book by Steven Pinker

The Blank Slate: The Modern Denial of Human Nature
- First edition cover
- Author: Steven Pinker
- Language: English
- Subject: Human nature
- Publication date: 2002
- Publication place: United States
- Media type: Print (Hardcover and Paperback)
- Pages: 509 pp
- ISBN: 0-670-03151-8

The Blank Slate: The Modern Denial of Human Nature is a 2002 book by cognitive psychologist Steven Pinker, in which he argues against tabula rasa models in the social sciences, claiming that human behaviour is significantly shaped by evolved psychological traits. The book was nominated for the 2003 Aventis Prizes and was a finalist for the Pulitzer Prize.

== Summary ==
Pinker argues that modern science has challenged three "linked dogmas" that constitute the dominant view of human nature in intellectual life:

- The blank slate – the idea that the mind has no innate traits (empiricism)
- The noble savage – the belief that people are born good and corrupted by society (romanticism)
- The ghost in the machine – the notion that each person has a soul making choices independent of biology (dualism)

Much of the book is dedicated to examining fears of the social and political consequences of his view of human nature:

- "the fear of inequality"
- "the fear of imperfectibility"
- "the fear of determinism"
- "the fear of nihilism"

Pinker claims these fears are non sequiturs, and that the blank slate view of human nature would actually be a greater threat if it were true. For example, he argues that political equality does not require sameness, but policies that treat people as individuals with rights; that moral progress does not require the human mind to be naturally free of selfish motives, only that it has other motives to counteract them; that responsibility does not require behavior to be uncaused, only that it respond to praise and blame; and that meaning in life does not require that the process that shaped the brain must have a purpose, only that the brain itself must have purposes. He also argues that grounding moral values in claims about a blank slate opens them to the possibility of being overturned by future empirical discoveries. He further argues that a blank slate is in fact inconsistent with opposition to many social evils since a blank slate could be conditioned to enjoy servitude and degradation.

Pinker states that evolutionary and genetic inequality arguments do not necessarily support right-wing policies. For example, if everyone is equal in ability it can be argued that it is only necessary to give everyone equal opportunity. On the other hand, if some people have less innate ability, then redistribution policies should favor those with less innate ability. Further, laissez-faire economics is built upon an assumption of a rational actor, while evolutionary psychology suggests that people have many different goals and behaviors that do not fit the rational actor theory. "A rising tide lifts all boats" is often used as an argument that inequality need not be reduced as long as there is growth. Evolutionary psychology suggests that low status itself, apart from material considerations, is highly psychologically stressful and may cause dangerous and desperate behaviors, which suggests that inequalities should be reduced. Finally, evolutionary explanations may also help the left create policies with greater public support, suggesting that people's sense of fairness (caused by mechanisms such as reciprocal altruism) rather than greed is a primary cause of opposition to welfare, if there is not a distinction in the proposals between what is perceived as the deserving and the undeserving poor.

Pinker also gives several examples of harm done by the belief in a blank slate of human nature:

- Totalitarian social engineering. If the human mind is a blank slate completely formed by the environment, then ruthlessly and totally controlling every aspect of the environment will create perfect minds.
- Inappropriate or excessive blame of parents since if their children do not turn out well this is assumed to be entirely environmentally caused and especially due to the behavior of the parents.
- Release of dangerous psychopaths who quickly commit new crimes.
- Construction of massive and dreary tenement complexes since housing and environmental preferences are assumed to be culturally caused and superficial.
- Persecution and even mass murder of the successful who are assumed to have gained unfairly. This includes not only individuals but entire successful groups who are assumed to have become successful unfairly and by exploitation of other groups. Examples include kulaks in the Soviet Union; teachers and "rich" peasants in the Cultural Revolution; city dwellers and intellectuals under the Khmer Rouge.

== Reception ==
=== Positive ===
Psychologist David Buss stated "This may be the most important book so far published in the 21st century."

Psychologist David P. Barash wrote "Pinker's thinking and writing are first-rate ... maybe even better than that."

Evolutionary biologist Richard Dawkins stated "The Blank Slate is ... a stylish piece of work. I won't say it is better than The Language Instinct or How the Mind Works, but it is as good—which is very high praise indeed."

Philosopher Daniel Dennett wrote "[Pinker] wades resolutely into the comforting gloom surrounding these not quite forbidden topics and calmly, lucidly marshals the facts to ground his strikingly subversive Darwinian claims—subversive not of any of the things we properly hold dear but subversive of the phony protective layers of misinformation surrounding them."

Yale psychology professor Paul Bloom endorsed the book in Trends in Cognitive Sciences, writing that it will have "an impact that extends well beyond the scientific academy".

English philosopher A. C. Grayling wrote in Literary Review that "Pinker's case is convincing and cogent, and he does a service in presenting the arguments, and the associated scientific evidence, in such an accessible fashion. Given the importance of the questions he discusses, his book is required reading".

Kirkus Reviews described the book as "a rich, sophisticated argument that may leave pious souls a little uneasy".

In 2017, Malhar Mali wrote a review of the book in Areo Magazine, expressing concern for what he sees as a revival of the blank slate view of human development. Mali writes "it strikes me as troubling that there are still those of us who are willing to believe that it is mostly culture and society which shape the individual—and that by focusing only on fixing our systems can we alleviate human suffering", and that it is "concerning is that this book came out 15 years ago and yet we are still bogged down in the conversations that Pinker spent a considerable time in rebutting".

=== Negative ===
Behavioral psychologist Henry D. Schlinger wrote two critical reviews of the book that emphasized the importance of learning. Another behavioral psychologist, Elliot A. Ludvig, criticized Pinker's description of behaviorism and interpretations of behaviorist research.

Philosopher John Dupré argued that the book overstated the case for biological explanations and argued for a balanced approach.

Biologist H. Allen Orr argued that Pinker's work often lacks scientific rigor, and suggests that it is "soft science".

Anthropologist Thomas Hylland Eriksen argued that most of Pinker's arguments were flawed since they employed a strawman fallacy argumentation style, and selectively picked supporting evidence as well as foils. He wrote: "perhaps the most damaging weakness in books of the generic Blank Slate kind is their intellectual dishonesty (evident in the misrepresentation of the views of others), combined with a faith in simple solutions to complex problems. The paucity of nuance in the book is astonishing." Similarly, biologist Patrick Bateson criticized Pinker for focusing on refuting the belief that all human characteristics are determined by a person's environment. He argued that this belief was "a caricature... used to sustain yet another round of the tedious and increasingly irrelevant nature-nurture debate."

Like Eriksen, Louis Menand, writing for The New Yorker, also claimed that Pinker's arguments constituted a strawman fallacy, stating "[m]any pages of The Blank Slate are devoted to bashing away at the Lockean-Rousseauian-Cartesian scarecrow that Pinker has created." Menand notes that Pinker misquotes and misunderstands Virginia Woolf as saying "In or about December 1910, human nature changed," (Pinker's response was "Woolf was wrong. Human nature did not change in 1910, or in any year thereafter.") Woolf actually wrote "On or about December 1910 human character changed," and she was writing about fiction, critiquing literary realism compared to the modernist movement.

Overall, one survey found that those social scientists who described themselves as left-leaning were much less open to integrating evolutionary biology into their work in the ways that Pinker advocated.

== See also ==
- Donald Brown
- Cartesian linguistics
- Noam Chomsky
- Evolutionary psychology
- Human Universals
- A Darwinian Left
- Imprinting
- John Locke
- Poverty of the stimulus
- Sociobiology
