= Linguistics (journal) =

- Discipline: Linguistics
- Language: English
- Edited by: Johan van der Auwera

Publication details
- History: 1963–present
- Publisher: Mouton de Gruyter
- Frequency: Bimonthly
- Impact factor: 0.763 (2015) and 0.872 (5-year)

Standard abbreviations
- ISO 4: Linguistics

Indexing
- ISSN: 0024-3949 (print); 1613-396X (web)

Links
- Journal homepage

Linguistics: An Interdisciplinary Journal of the Language Sciences is a peer-reviewed academic journal of general linguistics published by De Gruyter Mouton. The journal publishes both articles and book reviews. It publishes two special issues a year. The current Editor-in-Chief is Volker Gast. Since 2010, it has published 1400 pages per year.

== History ==
Linguistics was started in 1963 by Mouton Publishers in The Hague, apparently on the initiative of Mouton's Peter de Ridder as well as linguist C.H. van Schooneveld. In 1979, after Mouton had been bought by Walter de Gruyter, a new editorial board was established, consisting of Brian Butterworth, Bernard Comrie, Östen Dahl, Norbert Dittmar, Flip Droste, Jaap van Marle, and Jürgen Weissenborn. De facto, Brian Butterworth was editor-in-chief between 1979 and 1982. From 1982 through 2005, the editor was Wolfgang Klein, who was succeeded by Johan van der Auwera (2005-2019), and then Volker Gast.

A special feature of the journal is that originally the issues were not treated as part of an annual volume. As long as the journal was published by Mouton, only the issues were numbered, the volumes were not. In the sixteen years from 1963 to 1978, 214 issues were published, i.e. more than twelve per year on average. At Walter De Gruyter, volume numbers were introduced and the 1979 volume was numbered 17. Until 2009, also individual issues were assigned numbers.

== Abstracting and indexing ==
The journal is abstracted and indexed in:

- Academic Search and other EBSCO databases
- Scopus
- European Reference Index for the Humanities
- Academic One File
- Expanded Academic ASAP
- International Bibliography of Book Reviews of Scholarly Literature in the Humanities and Social Sciences
- International Bibliography of Periodical Literature in the Humanities and Social Sciences
- Arts and Humanities Citation Index
- Current Contents
- Social Sciences Citation Index
- MLA International Bibliography
- ProQuest/Arts & Humanities
- PsycINFO

The journal has a Thomson Reuters 2015 impact factor of 0.763 and a 5-year impact factor of 0.872.
