= Angela Saini =

British journalist (born 1980)

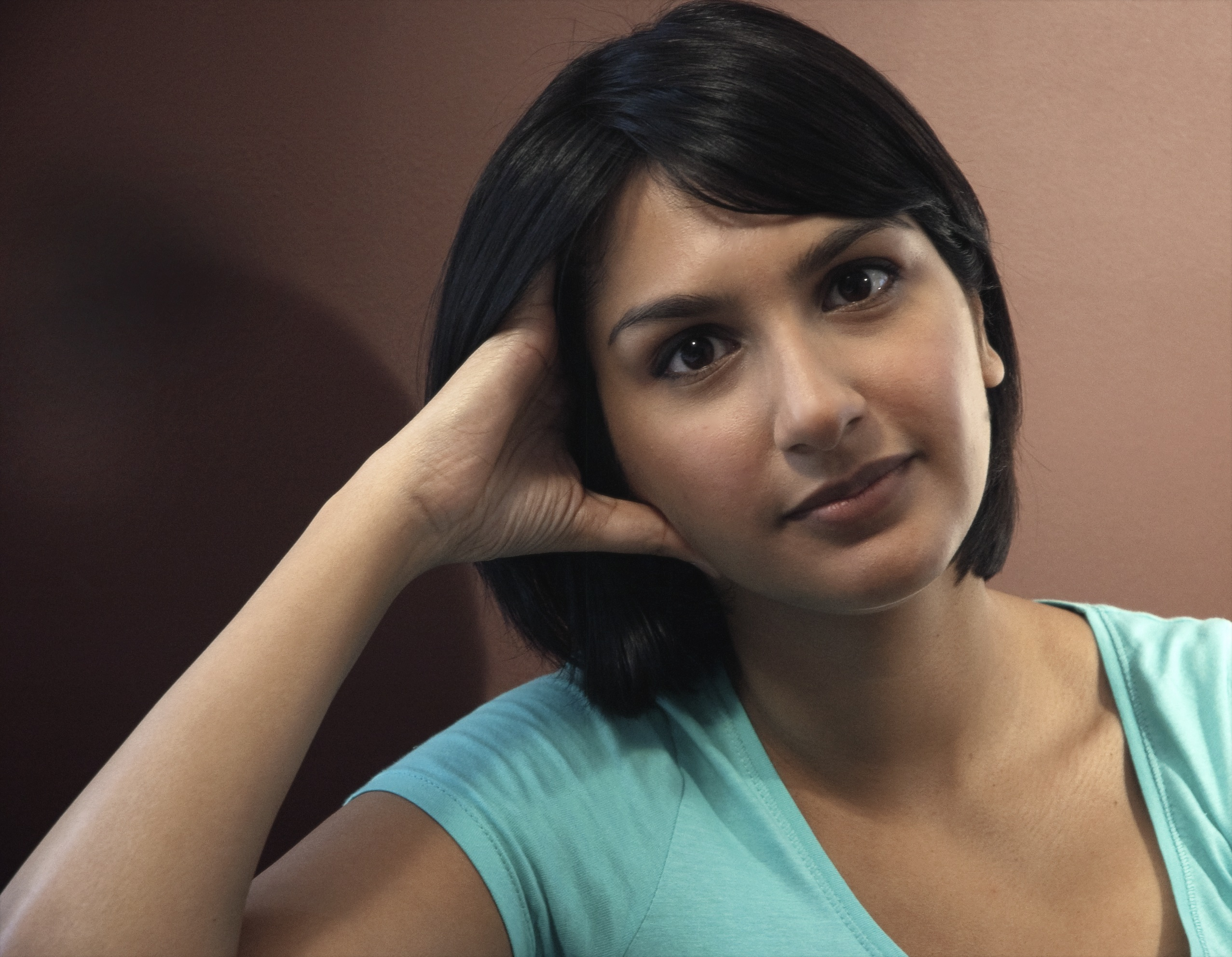
- Born: 1980 (age 45–46); London, England
- Education: University of Oxford (MA); King's College London (MSc)
- Occupation: Journalist
- Notable work: Inferior (2017); Superior (2019)
- Website: www.angelasaini.co.uk

Angela Saini (born 1980) is a British science journalist, broadcaster and the author of books, of which the fourth, The Patriarchs: The Origins of Inequality, was published in 2023 and was a finalist for that year's George Orwell Prize for Political Writing. Saini has worked as a reporter and presenter for the BBC and has written for a number of publications, including The Guardian, New Scientist, and Wired UK. She has also produced and presented several radio and television documentaries, including a BBC Radio 4 documentary on biofuels and a BBC World Service documentary on the impact of climate change on Indian agriculture. Saini's writing and reporting focus on how science interacts with society, especially on how it affects marginalized groups, and she has been acclaimed for her work by a diverse range of organizations and institutions.

== Early life and education ==
She holds two master's degrees: one in engineering from the University of Oxford, and one in science and security from the Department of war studies at King's College London. She was a student at Keble College, Oxford.

== Career ==
Saini began writing while at university, authoring two articles for The LIP Magazine. She worked as a reporter at the BBC, and left in 2008 to become a freelance writer. In 2008 Saini won a Prix CIRCOM for her investigation of fake universities, focusing on Isles International University. She was named European Young Science Writer of the Year in 2009.

In 2012, she won the Association of British Science Writers Award for best news item published in 2011. She was a Knight Science Journalism Fellow at the Massachusetts Institute of Technology between 2012 and 2013. In 2015 she won the American Association for the Advancement of Science Gold Award. In August 2017, an internal memo written by a Google employee about the company's diversity policies, (Google's Ideological Echo Chamber), received public attention. Saini criticised the memo, calling it "[not] just intellectual laziness; [but] prejudice masquerading as fact".

=== Television appearances ===
- Saini appeared on the 2018/19 Christmas University Challenge series representing King's College London, alongside Anita Anand (captain), Zoe Laughlin, and Anne Dudley.
- Saini presented the BBC Four documentary Eugenics: Science's Greatest Scandal, with disability rights activist and actor Adam Pearson.

=== Books ===
Saini's first book, Geek Nation: How Indian Science is Taking Over the World, was published in 2011. Her second book, Inferior: How Science Got Women Wrong and the New Research That’s Rewriting the Story, was published in 2017, a non-fiction book that explores the history of science's understanding of sex differences and the impact of this understanding on women's lives. The book delves into how scientists, researchers and society at large, have treated women as intellectually, emotionally and physically inferior to men for centuries. Through her research, Saini presents evidence to dispute these long-held beliefs, and how contemporary research is now challenging the traditional narrative about the differences between men and women.

The book covers many historical as well as contemporary examples of bias and mistreatment of women in the scientific field and how these wrong perceptions and beliefs have been used to justify discrimination and inequality. The book also highlights the contemporary research that is proving these notions to be false and how the understanding of sex differences is becoming more nuanced and more accurate. The book has received positive reviews and praised for Saini's clear and engaging writing style and the in-depth research that is presented. Critics have also highlighted the book as a significant contribution to the current ongoing conversation about gender equality and the representation of women in STEM fields. It was shortlisted for the Royal Society Insight Investment Science Book Prize in 2017. The book aims to inform readers on the background of these false beliefs and biases and to inform them about the more accurate understanding of sex differences that is being established today. The magazine of the Institute of Physics, Physics World, named Inferior as book of the year 2017. Saini told Physics World that her aim was to tackle the contradictory information on gender studies put forward in the media and in scholarly journals.

"Really I just wanted to get to the heart of that riddle... what does science actually say about men and women and what is the true extent of the sex differences between us?"

Her third book, Superior: The Return of Race Science, was published in May 2019. It was named as one of the top 10 books of 2019 by the science magazine Nature. “People want to believe they were born into a special group. Group superiority really appeals to them,” Saini says. In addition, “Very often they’re not remarkable people in their own right, and they need to believe something about themselves that makes them feel better about who they are.”

== Bibliography ==
- Geek Nation: How Indian Science is Taking Over the World. Hodder & Stoughton - Hodder Paperbacks. 2011. ISBN 978-1444710168.
- Inferior: How Science Got Women Wrong and the New Research That's Rewriting the Story. HarperCollins UK - 4th Estate. 2017. ISBN 978-0008172039.
- Superior: The Return of Race Science. Beacon Press. 2019. ISBN 978-0008341008.
- The Patriarchs: The Origins of Inequality. Beacon Press. 2023. ISBN 978-0807014547.
