= Cognitive Neuroscience Society =

International academic society

The Cognitive Neuroscience Society (CNS) is an international academic society interested in multi-disciplinary approaches to cognitive brain function. Drawing primarily from the biological and psychological sciences, society members are involved in cognitive neuroscience research that attempts to integrate our understanding of the brain and mind.

Founded in 1994 (32 years ago) by six scientists, Michael S. Gazzaniga (University of California, Santa Barbara), George R. Mangun (University of California, Davis), Steve Pinker (Harvard University), Patti Reuter-Lorenz (University of Michigan), Daniel Schacter (Harvard University), and Art Shimamura (University of California, Berkeley), the society brings together scientists from many different fields in its annual meeting held each spring, featuring a program of plenary speakers, symposia, posters, and special events, covering all aspects of cognitive neuroscience research.

Research into the functioning of the human brain, particularly during the past decade, has greatly enhanced our understanding of cognitive behaviors which are fundamental to education: learning, memory, intelligence, and emotion.
