= Philosophical Papers =

- Discipline: Philosophy
- Language: English
- Edited by: Ward E. Jones, Uchenna Okeja

Publication details
- History: 1986-present
- Publisher: Routledge (South Africa)
- Frequency: Triannual

Standard abbreviations
- ISO 4: Philos. Pap.

Indexing
- ISSN: 0556-8641 (print); 1996-8523 (web)

Links
- Journal homepage

Philosophical Papers is an international, generalist journal of philosophy, appearing three times a year. Philosophical Papers is primarily based in the Department of Philosophy at Rhodes University in Grahamstown and it is jointly edited by the philosophy departments of Rhodes and the University of the Witwatersrand in Johannesburg.

== See also ==
- Rhodes University
- University of the Witwatersrand
