= Henry Schlinger =

American psychologist

Henry D. Schlinger
- Citizenship: American
- Education: Southern Methodist University; Western Michigan University
- Known for: Applied behavior analysis
- Scientific career
- Fields: Psychology
- Institutions: California State University, Los Angeles
- Thesis: Effects of Reinforcement Duration and Reinforcement on Response Latency: Stimulus-Reinforcer and Probability Response-Reinforcer Relationships (1985)
- Doctoral advisors: Sid Dykstra; David O. Lyon; Jack Michael

Henry David Schlinger Jr. is an American psychologist known for his work in applied behavior analysis. He is a professor of psychology at California State University, Los Angeles, where he was formerly the director of the M.S. Program in Applied Behavior Analysis. He also holds a part-time position as an associate professor in the Chicago School of Professional Psychology's Applied Behavior Analysis program. He is a former editor-in-chief of both the Analysis of Verbal Behavior and the Behavior Analyst. He is a member of the Association for Behavior Analysis International and the board of trustees of the Cambridge Center for Behavioral Studies.
