= Words and Rules =

- Author: Steven Pinker
- Language: English
- Genre: Non-fiction
- Publication date: 1999

Words and Rules: The Ingredients of Language is a 1999 popular linguistics book by Steven Pinker about regular and irregular verbs.

"Words and rules" is a theory that has been predominantly developed by Pinker. It has been popularly contextualized within the so-called "past-tense debate," which was sparked by Rumelhart and McClelland's 1986 connectionist model of the production of regular and irregular verbs. In essence, the Words and Rules theory states that past-tense forms of verbs arise from both declarative memory (as words) and procedural systems (from rules).

== Main ideas ==
In his book, Pinker "tries to illuminate the nature of language and mind by choosing a single phenomenon and examining it from every angle imaginable." His analysis reflects his view that language and many other aspects of human nature are innate evolutionary-psychological adaptations. Most of the book examines studies conducted on the form and frequency of grammatical errors (such as overgeneralization in past-tense formation) in English (and to a lesser extent in German) as well as the speech of brain-damaged persons with selective aphasia. Pinker discusses neuropsychological dissociations in two types of aphasia: anomia and agrammatism. Anomic patients often produce fluent and generally grammatical speech despite having difficulty retrieving and recognizing words, which implies the lexicon is "more impaired than grammatical combination." Some patients also have jargon aphasia in which they speak their own neologisms (e.g. "nose cone" for "phone call") and often add regular suffixes onto their jargon, which suggests the area of the brain that computes regular inflection is distinct from the area in which words are processed. In contrast, agrammatic patients have difficulty assembling words into phrases and sentences and applying correct grammatical suffixes (either omitting them altogether or using the wrong one) and are therefore unable to produce fluent grammatical sequences. For example, when reading a list of words patients might read smiled as "smile" and wanted as "wanting"; the reason being that regularly inflected words are computed by rules as they are read, and that agrammatic patients have damage to the machinery that does the computing. However, when reading irregular past-tense forms and plurals, patients with impaired grammatical processing make fewer errors as they are still able to match irregular verbs against memory as wholes.

The title, Words and Rules, refers to a model Pinker believes best represents how words are represented in the mind. He writes that words are either stored directly with their associated meanings in the lexicon (or "mental dictionary") or are constructed using morphological rules. Leak and rose, for example, would be stored as mental dictionary entries, but the words leaked and roses do not need to be memorized separately, as they can be easily constructed by applying "rules" that add the appropriate suffixes (i.e. "adding '-ed'" to form the past-tense form and "adding '-s'" to form the plural form, respectively). In analyzing the errors English-speaking children make (such as the over-application of morphological rules to create words like mouses and bringed), Pinker concludes that irregular forms are not remembered in terms of the supposed rules that produce them (such as a rule that would produce sleep/slept, weep/wept, keep/kept, etc.), but instead are memorized separately, while the rule for forming regular past-tense forms (i.e. "adding '-ed') applies by default.

== Research ==
The Words and Rules model contradicts previous orthodox Chomskyan ideas hypothesizing that several irregular past tense forms arise from rules applied to verbs with phonological similarities (as seen with the example of sleep, weep, and keep above). He particularly notes discrepancies that would arise in application of a rule-based theory, as in the verb steep and its past-tense form steeped as opposed to steep/stept. Pinker accepts the notion of pattern associators from the connectionist model, which states that families of irregular verbs obtain their past-tense forms from associations between the phonological features of these verbs and those of their irregular past-tense forms. Pinker found that some adults and children will form the past-tense form splung from the novel verb spling in line with the pattern seen in fling/flung and cling/clung. However, he shows research showing these sorts of generalizations to be exceedingly rare in comparison to the over-application of the regular past-tense rule to these verbs. He additionally points out that connectionist models tend to produce odd past-tense forms of verbs that otherwise have regular past-tense forms (e.g. membled for mail).
