= Of Two Minds (book) =

1998 book; 2nd edition: 2021

Of Two Minds: The Revolutionary Science of Dual-Brain Psychology
- Cover of the first edition
- Author: Fredric Schiffer
- Language: English
- Genre: Psychology, psychiatry, neuroscience, philosophy of mind
- Publisher: The Free Press (an imprint of Simon & Schuster); 2nd edition: self-published
- Publication date: 1998; 2nd, revised edition: 2021
- Media type: Print (hardcover and paperback)
- Pages: 288
- ISBN: 978-0684854243

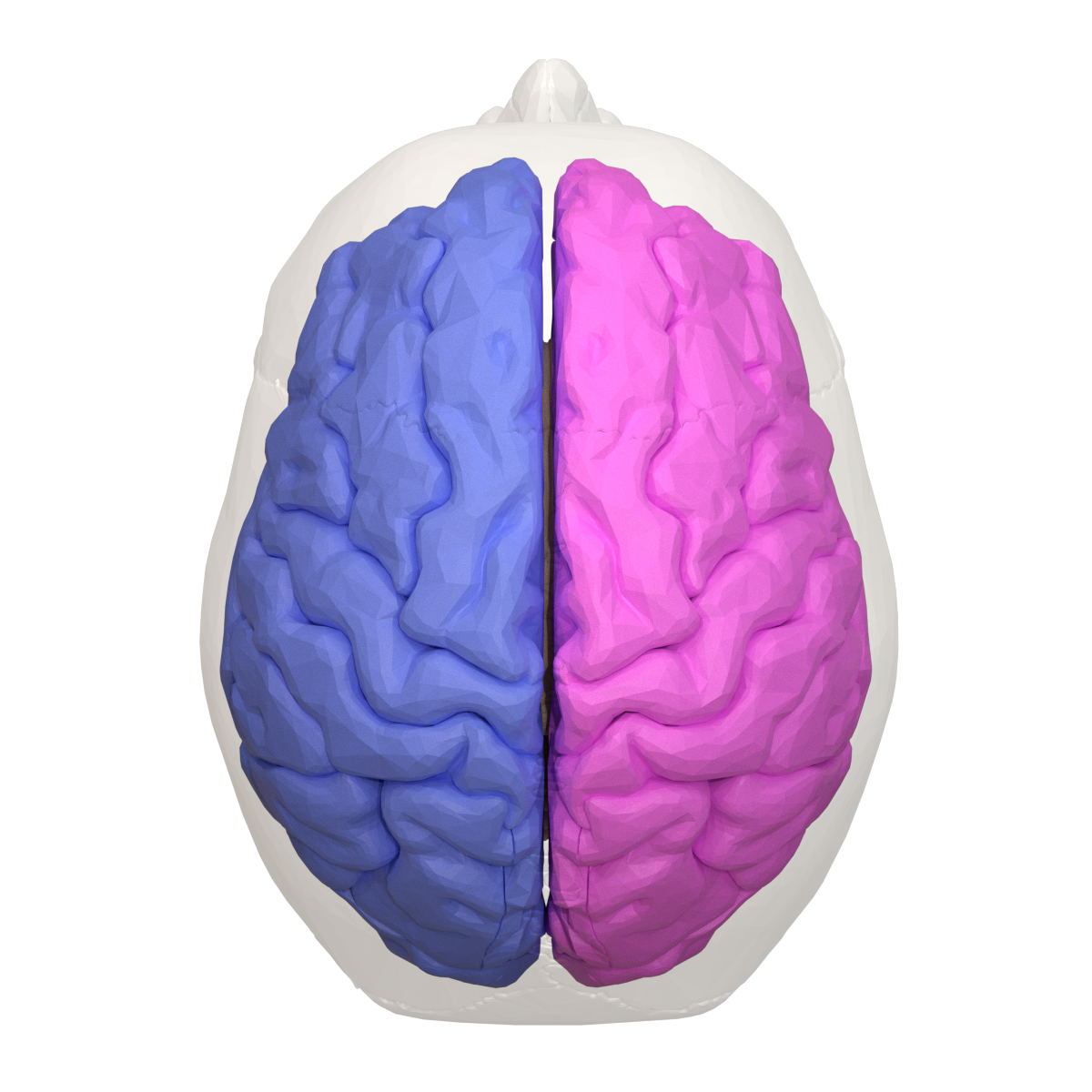
The two cerebral hemispheres

Of Two Minds: The Revolutionary Science of Dual-Brain Psychology is a book written by the American psychiatrist Fredric Schiffer (MD degree in 1971) wherein he proposes that each person behaves as if there are two minds within the person, and that by recognizing and relating to the two separate minds, the therapist can promote healing and understanding of problems such as depression, anxiety, addictive behavior and delusional thoughts. The author writes that by "two minds in one person" he means that a "part of an individual ...has a unique set of memories, motivations, and behaviors alongside another part of him which has a different unique (though possibly similar) set of memories, motivations and behaviors." (Schiffer 2nd edition, 2021, p.30) The author locates a "mind" in each of the two physical halves (hemispheres) of the brain. and he "maintains that one hemisphere can be more immature than the other and that this imbalance leads to different mental disorders". During his counseling, as an exercise he has his patients cover all of one eye, and the inner half of the other eye, which the author feels selectively stimulates one cerebral hemisphere more than the other – activating the thoughts and feelings of that hemisphere – which allows one to "'talk' to each half of the brain separately, to learn which is less mature, and to bring the two hemispheres into harmony".

== Background ==
In the early 1960s, the team of the neurosurgeon Joseph Bogen, the neuropsychologist Roger Sperry, and the "psychobiology" graduate student Michael Gazzaniga performed psychological experiments on patients who for medical treatment had undergone "split-brain surgery" which cuts the corpus callosum and thus severs the main link between the two sides of the brain known as the cerebral hemispheres. Bogen related that some researchers regard that following the surgery of "splitting of the brain," a "single mind is cut into two but that ...it is abnormal to have two brains," meaning that the surgery creates an artificial situation which does not exist in normal people, but others feel that "every person is born with two brains but because the two sides get along so well, people simply have the illusion of one mind."

In his book Of Two Minds Schiffer "enters the fray" by giving his research findings and implications of his theory of each person having a "dual brain."

== Summary and content ==
=== Preface ===
In the preface to the book, the author relates a case from the 1970s where a university student he was counseling for anxiety and depression seemed to display one personality which was "more mature and healthier" and another personality which was "emotionally immature." The author then relates that when he had started to undergo psychoanalysis by Elvin Semrad as part of his psychiatric training that the author felt that he too had "two distinct parts."

=== Introduction ===
The author writes that in 1995 he read about research by Werner Wittling which described a technique of how a movie could be shown just to one hemisphere in "intact," normal people – meaning in those who had not had "split-brain" surgery. Wittling found that films shown to the right side of the brain "often elicited a stronger emotional and physical response than when shown to the left brain." In what then became a "eureka" moment for Schiffer, he tried to perform a "home version" of Wittling's experiment simply by covering all of one eye, and the inner half of the other eye. Such a covering of the eyes is known to first send what is being seen to the opposite side of the brain; for example, covering all of the right eye and the inner half of the left eye first sends the image seen to the opposite side of the brain, in this case to the right hemisphere. Later that same day, Schiffer tried this method with several of his counseling patients. For the first patient that day, when seeing from only the extreme left, the patient "became a bit agitated and said, 'Oh, my God!' 'What's that?' [Schiffer said.] I [Schiffer] had no idea what he meant. [The patient said] 'I have all my anxiety back.'" And then when covering the eyes so that the patient saw only from the extreme right, the patient immediately felt better.

=== First three chapters ===
In the first three chapters, Schiffer discusses more recent "split-brain" studies, and studies in patients with intact brains using "lateralizing" devices (which first show an image to only one hemisphere), as well as other tests to assess brain activity such as the Wada test, electroencephalogram (EEG), PET scan and functional MRI scan.

=== Chapter 4: Dual-Brain Psychology ===
The author writes that the "aim of dual-brain therapy is to mend the archaic, destructive ideas and emotions of the mind on the troubled side, to teach it that it is safer and more valuable than it learned during some traumatic experience." The author feels that "free association" relates to "feelings or ideas coming from the immature side" of the brain, with the "interpretations" by the analyst as being the "deciphering of the thoughts of the...immature mind," and that "transference" is the "relationship between...[the] immature mind and the therapist."

=== Chapters 5 through 10 ===
In these chapters the author deals with cases of anxiety, depression, post-traumatic stress disorder (PTSD), "nervous breakdown" (psychotic episode), cocaine addiction, and the psychological aspects of heart attack. A feature throughout these chapters is that Schiffer provides transcripts of recordings of counseling sessions as the patient speaks as one side of the visual field is covered, and then the opposite visual field is covered, which Schiffer believes represents the thoughts and feelings of each separate side of the brain as brought out by the selective stimulation of one side of the brain.

=== Chapter 11 ===
This chapter is a summary of the author's work of "Dual-Brain Psychology" and how to practically apply it to one's own situation. Further case studies are given.

=== Epilogue ===
Here, in the first edition of his book from 1998, the author presents other scientific studies which he is planning to perform to evaluate "Dual-Brain Psychology."

=== 2nd edition, published in 2021 ===
In the second edition, published in 2021, the author gives a "Preface to the 2nd Edition" which traces how his work, research and thinking have developed since his original edition twenty-three years earlier. The first and second edition of Schiffer's Of Two Minds are almost word-for-word the same.

== Publication ==
The subtitle for the American edition is "The Revolutionary Science of Dual-Brain Psychology." The subtitle for the British edition is "A New Approach for Better Understanding and Improving Your Emotional Life." Both editions were published by imprints of Simon and Schuster. The subtitle for the second edition is simply "Dual-Brain Psychology."

The book was also published in a German translation in 2007 by the publisher VAK. The title in German is Eine Brille für die Seele: Die neue Dual-Brain-Psychologie und ihre Anwendung bei Ängsten, Konflikten und Belastungen ("Glasses for the Soul: The New Dual-brain Psychology and Its Application to Fears, Conflicts and Stress").

== Reception ==
Schiffer writes in the preface to the second edition of his book that his "work was not being widely appreciated by the Academy of scientists," referring to those in academic research and teaching (Schiffer 2nd edition, 2021, p. 8). The first edition received an endorsement from Candace Pert (deceased in 2013), a PhD pharmacologist who did research in neuroscience. She wrote that "Dr. Schiffer rivals Freud in his revolutionary theories on understanding the human psyche." In the second edition, two others are listed as giving their endorsement for the content of the first edition: the neurosurgeon Joseph Bogen (deceased in 2005) wrote that the book is "wonderfully readable and well-informed, this is the best book ever on the social and psychiatric implications of the split brain research" and Bessel van der Kolk, a psychiatrist known for his work in post-traumatic stress disorder, wrote that Schiffer's book "provides the reader with a lucid exposé of the evolving understanding of the dual mind/brains that we all possess." (Schiffer 2nd edition, 2021, p.3)

A significant negative review was published in 1998 in the journal Nature by Ian Christopher McManus, a British physician and neuroscientist specializing in handedness and cerebral lateralization, who basically discounted every main point which Schiffer presented, but the major argument is that Schiffer's theory is an "extension of hemisphericity, the dubious concept...."

In The New England Journal of Medicine, the research psychiatrist Robert M. A. Hirschfeld, MD published a review in the year 1999 wherein he stated that Schiffer's book was "bold, interesting and ambitious," and "breaks new ground."

== See also ==
- Dual consciousness
- Lateralization of brain function
- Split-brain
- Adverse childhood experiences
- Fredric Schiffer

== Sources ==
- Schiffer, Fredric (1998), Of Two Minds: The Revolutionary Science of Dual-Brain Psychology, The Free Press (Simon & Schuster), ISBN 978-0684854243
