= Michael Gazzaniga =

American psychologist and cognitive neuroscientist (born 1939)

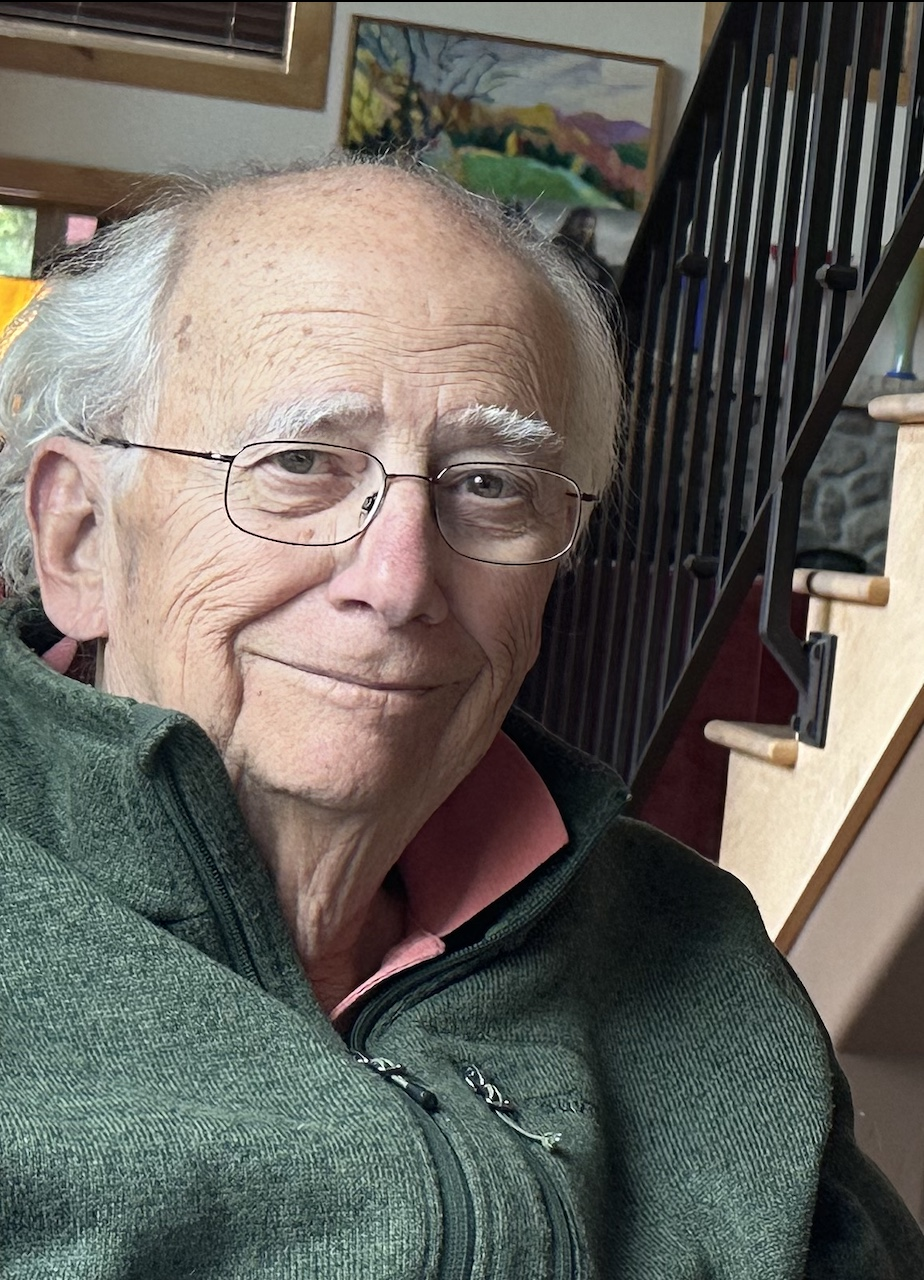
- Born: December 12, 1939 (age 86); Los Angeles, California, U.S.
- Education: Dartmouth College (B.A.); California Institute of Technology (Ph.D.)
- Known for: Split-brain research, cerebral lateralization, cognitive neuroscience
- Awards: Honorary doctorates from Trinity College Dublin, Dartmouth College, and University of Aberdeen
- Scientific career
- Fields: Psychology, neuroscience, neuropsychology
- Workplaces: University of California, Santa Barbara
- Thesis: Some effects of cerebral commissurotomy on monkey and man (1965)
- Doctoral advisor: Roger Sperry
- Doctoral students: Joseph E. LeDoux, Michael Miller

Michael Saunders Gazzaniga (born December 12, 1939) is an American cognitive neuroscientist and professor emeritus of psychology at the University of California, Santa Barbara (UCSB). He is the founder and retired director of the SAGE Center for the Study of the Mind at UCSB (2006–2023).

== Biography ==
In 1961, Gazzaniga graduated from Dartmouth College with a B.A. in zoology. In 1964, he received a Ph.D. in psychobiology from the California Institute of Technology, where he carried out research on human split-brain patients for his doctoral thesis under Roger Sperry. In his subsequent work, Gazzaniga has made advances in research concerning the lateralization of brain function and communication between the left and right cerebral hemispheres.

== Career ==
Gazzaniga's academic career began as an assistant professor of psychology at UCSB in 1967. There he met Colin Blakemore, a graduate student at the University of California, Berkeley, with whom he would later collaborate. Together, they edited the Handbook of Psychobiology in 1975. In 1969, he moved to the New York University graduate school as an assistant professor, and in 1972 he became a full professor. In 1973, he took a position as professor of psychology at the State University of New York at Stony Brook (and later became a professor of social sciences in medicine). That same year, at the invitation of Dartmouth neurosurgeon Donald Wilson, Gazzaniga began to study a new series of split-brain patients in New Hampshire with his graduate student, Joseph LeDoux. They put together a mobile lab and drove from New York to New Hampshire every month to test what became known as the East Coast series of split-brain patients, one of whom was patient P.S. Patient P.S. was the first split-brain patient whose right hemisphere could read. It could not speak, but it could spell out answers to questions (see Patient P.S. below). Gazzaniga first formulated his theory of the left hemisphere's interpreter at this time. After he received his doctorate, LeDoux turned his research efforts to the subject of emotion.

In 1977, Gazzaniga was offered a job at Cornell University Medical College when Fred Plum, the chairman of the neurology department, decided that his residents needed some schooling in neuropsychology. Plum appointed Gazzaniga director of the Division of Cognitive Neuroscience and professor of neurology and psychology. Gazzaniga remained in this role until 1988.

In 1978, he and his friend and colleague from Rockefeller University, Professor of Psychology George A. Miller, launched a new field of study, coining the term cognitive neuroscience. Cognitive neuroscience integrates the methods of cognitive psychology with those of systems neuroscience to help understand how mental processes emerge from neural activity. With a small grant from the Sloan Foundation, Gazzaniga established the Cognitive Neuroscience Institute to develop a program of research and training focused on the brain mechanisms involved with cognitive processes.

With continued funding from the Sloan Foundation, Gazzaniga extended the Cornell program to include a consortium of New York City universities, in order to help establish the growing field of cognitive neuroscience and began a postdoctoral training program. In 1982, he was elected a fellow of the Society of Experimental Psychologists in recognition of his studies on split-brain patients. In 1988, still making monthly trips to New Hampshire in the mobile lab, he was offered a professorship at Dartmouth Medical School.

From 1988 to 1992, he was the Andrew W. Thomson Jr. Professor of Psychiatry and the director of the Cognitive Neuroscience Program at Dartmouth Medical School. During that time, Gazzaniga founded the first cognitive neuroscience degree-granting program in the United States; founded and served as the first editor-in-chief of the Journal of Cognitive Neuroscience through 2003; and with help from the James S. McDonnell Foundation, initiated and ran the Summer Institute in Cognitive Neuroscience at Dartmouth. Each summer, the institute brought together graduate students, postdoctoral researchers, and leaders in the various fields of cognitive neuroscience for a two-week lecture and laboratory course on an emerging topic.

After his time at Dartmouth Medical School, Gazzaniga moved to the University of California, Davis in 1992, where he launched and served as the first Director of the Center for Neuroscience. There, he continued to expand his pioneering research on brain function and cognitive processes.

In 1993, he founded—together with George R. Mangun, Steve Pinker, Patricia Reuter-Lorenz, Daniel Schacter, and Art Shimamura—the Cognitive Neuroscience Society, a professional organization dedicated to advancing the field. The inaugural meeting was held in San Francisco in 1994. 1993 also marks the first summer that a three-week stocktaking of the subspecialty fields of cognitive neuroscience began. Eight leaders in each field were invited for an intensive meeting of self-examination and to write a chapter about their work. This stocktaking of the field continues to occur every 5 years. The result is the six-volume series, The Cognitive Neurosciences, published by MIT Press.

In 1996, Gazzaniga returned to Dartmouth as the David T. McLaughlin Distinguished Professor of Psychological and Brain Sciences, as well as founding director of the Center for Cognitive Neuroscience. Under his leadership, Dartmouth was the first college to have a functional brain imaging center. He was elected to the American Academy of Arts and Sciences in 1997. Gazzaniga served as the Dean of the Faculty of Arts and Sciences at Dartmouth College from 2002 to 2004, while concurrently serving on the President's Council on Bioethics from 2002–2009. In 2005, he was elected to the National Academy of Medicine.

In 2006, Gazzaniga became the founding director of the SAGE Center for the Study of the Mind at UCSB, a role he took on after his time at Dartmouth. In 2007, the John D. and Catherine T. MacArthur Foundation appointed him director of the Law and Neuroscience Project, "the first systematic effort to bring together the worlds of law and science on questions of how courts should deal with recent breakthroughs in neuroscience as they relate to matters of assessing guilt, innocence, punishment, bias, truth-telling, and other issues." At UCSB, he continued to lead research efforts in cognitive neuroscience, while fostering the study of the mind's complex relationship with the brain.

In 2009, Gazzaniga delivered the Gifford Lectures on Mental Life at the University of Edinburgh. In 2011, he was elected to the National Academy of Sciences, and he received honorary doctorates from Dartmouth College and the University of Aberdeen. In 2019, Trinity College Dublin also awarded him an honorary doctorate.

Over the course of his career, Gazzaniga's work has contributed to the development of experimental methods to study hemispheric specialization and the brain's role in cognitive functions such as language, reasoning, and facial recognition.

Gazzaniga's publication career includes books for a general audience, such as The Social Brain, Mind Matters, Nature's Mind, The Ethical Brain, Human, Who's in Charge? (which is based on his Gifford lectures at the University of Edinburgh in 2009), and Tales From Both Sides of the Brain. He is also the editor of The Cognitive Neurosciences book series published by MIT Press, which features the work of nearly 200 scientists and is a sourcebook for the field. His latest book is entitled The Consciousness Instinct: Unraveling the Mystery of How the Brain Makes Mind, published by Farrar, Straus and Giroux in 2018.

== Research ==
=== Early research ===
Gazzaniga is known for his work in cognitive neuroscience. His research with split-brain patients has helped to understand the distinct roles of the left and right hemispheres of the brain. In split-brain patients, the corpus callosum—the giant nerve bundle that connects the right and left hemispheres—has been severed to limit the transmission of nerve impulses across the brain, in hopes of decreasing previously intractable seizures. The original series of split-brain patients, whose callosotomies had been performed during the 1930s in Rochester, New York, had been previously tested; no evidence was found of any disruption to the interhemispheric transfer of information after callosotomy. Later, however, Sperry and his graduate student Ron Myers found that severing the corpus callosum in monkeys did block the transfer of information.

As a first-year graduate student at Caltech, Gazzaniga—convinced by the monkey research that transfer of information would be interrupted—began to test the first California split-brain patient (patient W.J.) with a testing procedure that had not been performed on the previous series of split-brain patients. Gazzaniga had to present information to one hemisphere only in order for his experiment to work. The anatomy of the optic nerve allowed him to communicate solely to one hemisphere or the other. Visual information flashed to the right side of the visual field of both eyes is sent to the left hemisphere, and visual information flashed to the left side of the visual field of both eyes is sent to the right hemisphere. Gazzaniga designed an apparatus that flashed a letter, number, or symbol onto a screen to either the right or left visual field while the patient focused on a central point. By fixating on a central point, the quickly flashed figure (200 ms) could be isolated to a particular visual field.

=== Patient W.J. ===
Patient W.J. was a World War II paratrooper, the first of a series of patients who underwent a callosotomy on the West Coast.

He had developed grand mal seizures after a German soldier knocked him unconscious with a rifle butt after a parachute jump behind enemy lines. When it was suggested that he might benefit from a callosotomy, he was having anywhere from one grand mal seizure per week to seven seizures per day, each requiring a full day to recover. He was ready to risk the surgery. This surgery, which severed his entire corpus callosum and anterior commissure, was a success. W.J. had no further seizures and said he felt no different (except for being seizure-free) than before surgery. Before the surgery, Gazzaniga had tested W.J.'s brain functions. This testing included identifying stimuli presented to the left and right visual fields, as well as identifying objects placed in his hands that were hidden from view, all of which he could easily do. After W.J. had the surgery, the test results were different. When a picture of an object was flashed to his right visual field and he was asked if he saw anything, he quickly named the object. When a picture was flashed to his left visual field, however, he denied seeing anything. Then a circle was flashed on the screen, and he was asked to point to whatever he had seen with whichever hand he wished. When the circle was flashed to the right visual field, he pointed to where it had been with his right hand, which is controlled by the left hemisphere. When it was flashed to his left visual field, even though he denied seeing anything, he pointed to where it had been with his left hand, controlled by the right hemisphere. This seemingly simple test showed that each hemisphere saw a circle when it was shown in the opposite visual field; in addition, each hemisphere, separate from the other, could guide the contralateral hand, which it controls, to point to the circle it had seen, but only the left hemisphere could talk about it. Neither hemisphere knew what the other hemisphere had seen.

Another experiment revealed that the right hemisphere was adept at visuospatial relations. A card showing a pattern produced by a set of blocks was put on a table in front of W.J. He was asked to copy the pattern using a set of blocks with his left hand, which was quickly able to reproduce the pattern. When it was his right hand's turn, it fumbled around haphazardly. Indeed, seeing what his right hand was doing, the left hand kept trying to help the right hand. W.J. needed to sit on his left hand to stop it from interfering: two different mental control systems were competing with each other to solve the problem.

These experiments opened the door to years of research by Gazzaniga and his colleagues; this research has revealed that severing the callosum prevents the transfer of perceptual, sensory, motor, gnostic (previously learned information about objects, persons, or places collected through the senses), and other types of information between the left and right cerebral hemispheres. Extensive research has shown that many of the brain's processes are lateralized, such as speech and language to the left hemisphere, along with analytical thinking and the capacity to interpret (not necessarily correctly) behavior and unconsciously driven emotional states; visuospatial processing, facial recognition, attentional monitoring, and the ascribing of beliefs to others are right-hemisphere processes.

=== Patient P.S. ===
At the age of 20 months, Patient P.S. developed a high fever and had many right-sided seizures, which became generalized, with a seizure focus over the left temporal region. He appeared to develop normally until age 10, when generalized seizures recurred spontaneously and became intractable. At age 14, he had a complete surgical section of the corpus callosum. He was also the first split-brain patient studied from the East Coast series who had a full callosotomy with an intact anterior commissure. He had absolutely no interhemispheric transfer of visual information; although only his left hemisphere could speak, he was the first split-brain patient in that series who demonstrated extensive language comprehension in the right hemisphere. For example, if he was asked to name an object in a picture presented to his left visual field (right hemisphere), while he could not answer with speech, he spelled out the appropriate word with Scrabble tiles using his left hand. Even though he was right-handed, he could also roughly write words with his left hand. P.S.'s right hemisphere's verbal skills are unusual. Review studies on three series of patients who had undergone brain bisection found that right-hemisphere language in split-brain patients happens infrequently. It is almost always attributable to early left-hemisphere brain damage (but see Patient J.W. below).

Gazzaniga and his graduate student Joseph LeDoux realized that P.S. presented them with the opportunity to directly question his right hemisphere: would it be able to answer subjective and personal questions and, more specifically, did it possess its own sense of identity? To do so, the researchers verbally asked, "Who blank?" and then flashed the rest of the sentence, "are you?", to his left visual field only and thus to his right hemisphere. He spelled out "Paul" (his first name) with his left hand using the tiles.

With the next question, the researchers asked, “Would you spell your favorite blank” and then flashed “girl” to his left visual field. P.S. shrugged and shook his head: his left hemisphere had seen nothing. However, he then giggled and blushed. The right hemisphere had seen and read the word “girl”, and the right hemisphere’s comprehension of the word had caused him to blush and giggle, as most young teenage boys would have at this question. The left hemisphere, which had not seen "girl", had no understanding of why he was blushing and giggling. Then his left hand reached out for three Scrabble tiles and spelled out the name “Liz”.

Another telling question asked the right hemisphere which job he would choose. P.S. spelled out “automobile race” with his left hand; however, shortly after the end of the session, he was asked the entire question out loud (so his left hemisphere heard it), and his left speaking hemisphere answered, “Oh, be a draftsman.” Each hemisphere had a separate goal. The experimental session ended after asking the right hemisphere to spell out its mood. The left hand spelled out "good".

P.S. is best known for an experiment using a simultaneous concept test, which led to the discovery of a major left-hemisphere capacity. In this test, a picture of a snow scene was flashed exclusively to P.S.’s right hemisphere, while a picture of a chicken’s foot was flashed exclusively to his left hemisphere. Four cards (a lawnmower, a rake, a shovel, and a pick) were in front of his left hand, and four cards were in front of his right hand (an apple, a toaster, a hammer, and a chicken head). P.S. was asked to pick the picture card best related to the stimuli that he had seen. With his right hand, guided by his left hemisphere, he picked the chicken to match the chicken’s foot. With his left hand, guided by his right hemisphere, he picked the shovel to match the snow scene.

When P.S. was asked why he had just performed those actions, he replied without hesitation, “I saw a claw and I picked the chicken, and you have to clean out the chicken shed with a shovel.” While the experimenters knew why P.S.’s right hemisphere had picked the shovel, his left speaking hemisphere did not. It had not seen the snow scene. This hemisphere did see his left hand pointing to the shovel. The left hemisphere's answer, however, was not "I don't know." Thus, whatever his answer might be for why his left hand was pointing to the shovel, this answer would be a guess, a story that would cover as much of the incoming information to the left hemisphere as possible. The same results were obtained after many different trials: the left hemisphere could accurately report why it had picked the answer that it had, and the left hemisphere proceeded to include the right hemisphere's behavioral response (which the left hemisphere could see) as part of the story. These results suggested to LeDoux and Gazzaniga that they might be observing a basic mental mechanism of the left hemisphere. They suggested,

the conscious verbal self is not always privy to the origin of our actions, and when it observes the person behaving for unknown reasons, it attributes cause to the action as if it knows for certain, but in fact it does not. It is as if the verbal self looks out and sees what the person is doing, and from that knowledge it interprets a reality.

Thinking about P.S. and his blushing when the right hemisphere was asked about his favorite girl, the researchers wondered if the emotional states of one hemisphere could influence the affective tone of the other hemisphere.

=== Patient V.P. ===
At the age of 6, patient V.P. had recurrent seizures following febrile illnesses that included measles and scarlet fever. Over the following years, she developed grand mal, petit mal, and myoclonic episodes that did not abate with multiple anticonvulsants. When the patient was 27, Dr. Mark Rayport—founding chairman of the Department of Neurological Surgery at the Medical College of Ohio—performed a partial anterior callosal section in early April 1979; in a second operation 7 weeks later, he completed the section of her callosum.

Four months after V.P.'s surgery, her right hemisphere could write simple answers and could carry out verbal commands. For example, if the command “smile” was flashed to her right hemisphere, she could do so. When asked why she was smiling, she would give an invented explanation. V.P. was the second split-brain patient in the East Coast series whose right hemisphere had some verbal capacity. Gazzaniga investigated whether he could induce a mood state in the right hemisphere, whether the left hemisphere would be aware of this state, and how the left hemisphere would respond.

A previous experiment with split-brain monkeys had shown that emotional states appear to transfer between the hemispheres subcortically, that is, in areas not affected by callosotomy, so it seemed possible. Gazzaniga showed V.P.'s right hemisphere a frightening film clip in which a man pushed another man off a balcony and threw a firebomb onto him. Then she was asked what she had seen. She said, “I don’t really know what I saw. I think just a white flash.” When asked if it made her feel any emotions, she answered, “I don’t really know why, but I’m kind of scared. I feel jumpy, I think maybe I don’t like this room, or maybe it’s you.” She said to one of the research assistants, “I know I like Dr. Gazzaniga, but right now I’m scared of him for some reason.” She felt the emotional response to the video her right hemisphere had seen, but she had no idea what caused it. Therefore, she looked around to invent an ad hoc answer. Gazzaniga explained, "The left-brain interpreter had to explain why she felt scared. The information it received from the environment was that I was in the room asking questions and that nothing else was wrong. The first makes-sense explanation it arrived at was that I was scaring her."

Gazzaniga later called this capacity to interpret behavior and unconsciously driven emotional states 'the Interpreter'. This system attempts to make sense of internally and externally generated information. It constructs explanations for events and emotions, sometimes going beyond the available information or overlooking relevant information. Gazzaniga postulates that the interpreter underlies the human drive to seek explanations for events. This system is not always accurate.

=== Patient J.W. ===
Patient J.W. suffered a concussive head trauma at age 13, after which he began to have brief absence spells that went untreated. At 19, he experienced his first grand mal seizure. The frequency of the seizures increased and could not be controlled with medication. In 1979, when he was 26 years old, he underwent a two-stage callosotomy. Immediately following both surgeries, his right hemisphere had the capacity to understand spoken and written language, meaning that he had a right-hemisphere semantic system, but he was unable to speak. For example, he could match pictures and words with his left hand. When a picture of a bird was presented to his right hemisphere, he pointed to the written word "bird" with his left hand. When the word "zebra" was presented to his right hemisphere, he pointed to a picture of a zebra. Eleven years later, while evaluating equipment for stabilizing the visual field, J.W. began naming pictures that were presented to his right hemisphere. Over the following several years, this ability continued to increase. Until then, the previously reported post-callosotomy dynamic periods of right-hemisphere language capacity suggested that the right hemisphere could develop language skills only in the absence of the left hemisphere when there had been damage to the left hemisphere in childhood. Another interpretation of the data was that observations of right-hemisphere language development were restricted by the limited life span of postoperative adult patients. J.W. was the first split-brain patient to demonstrate an increasing ability for right-hemisphere speech many years after his callosotomy. While long-term functional plasticity has been suggested in adults, documentation of this phenomenon is scarce.

== Selected publications ==
- Gazzaniga, Michael S. (1970). The Bisected Brain. New York: Appleton-Century-Crofts. ISBN 978-0-390-35278-1.
- Gazzaniga, Michael S.; LeDoux, Joseph E. (1978). The Integrated Mind. New York: Plenum Pr. ISBN 978-0-306-31085-0.
- Gazzaniga, Michael S. (1987). Social Brain: Discovering the Networks of the Mind. Basic Books. ISBN 978-0-465-07850-9.
- Gazzaniga, Michael S. (1988). Mind Matters: How Mind and Brain Interact to Create Our Conscious Lives. Boston: Houghton Mifflin. ISBN 978-0-395-50095-8.
- Gazzaniga, Michael S. (1992). Nature's Mind: The Biological Roots of Thinking, Emotions, Sexuality, Language and Intelligence. New York: BasicBooks. ISBN 978-0-465-04863-2.
- Gazzaniga, Michael S. (2000). The Mind's Past. Berkeley, Calif.: University of California Press. ISBN 978-0-520-22486-5.
- Gazzaniga, Michael S. (2005). The Ethical Brain. New York [u.a.]: Dana Press. ISBN 978-1-932594-01-0.
- Senior, Carl; Russell, Tamara; Gazzaniga, Michael S. (2006). Methods in Mind (1st ed.). Cambridge, MA: The MIT Press. ISBN 978-0-262-19541-6.
- Gazzaniga, Michael S.; Ivry, Richard B.; Mangun, George R. (2009). Cognitive Neuroscience: The Biology of the Mind (5th ed.). New York: W.W. Norton. ISBN 9780393603170.
- Gazzaniga, Michael S. (2009). Human: The Science Behind What Makes Us Unique (1st ed.). New York: Harper Perennial. ISBN 978-0-06-089289-0.
- Gazzaniga, Michael S. (2011). Who's in Charge?: Free Will and the Science of the Brain (1st ed.). New York, NY: Ecco. ISBN 978-0-06-190610-7.
- Gazzaniga, Michael S. (2015). Tales from Both Sides of the Brain: A Life in Neuroscience (1st ed.). New York, NY: Ecco. ISBN 978-0062228802.
- Gazzaniga, Michael S. (2018). The Consciousness Instinct: Unraveling the Mystery of How the Brain Makes the Mind (1st ed.). New York, NY: Farrar, Straus and Giroux. ISBN 978-0374715502.

== Awards ==
- Elected fellow of the American Academy of Arts and Sciences in 1997.
- Elected to the National Academy of Medicine (formerly called Institute of Medicine) in 2005.
- The Distinguished Scientific Contribution Award from the American Psychological Association in 2008.
- Dartmouth College Honorary Doctorate in 2011.
- University of Aberdeen Honorary Doctorate in 2011.
- The William James Fellow of the Association for Psychological Science in 2015.
- Elected fellow of the National Academy of Sciences in 2011.

== See also ==
- Attentional shift
- Split-brain
- Left-brain interpreter
- Lateralization of brain function
- Brain asymmetry
- Laterality
- Bicameral mentality
- Society of Mind
- Dual consciousness
- Divided consciousness
- Alien hand syndrome
