= Dual consciousness =

Hypothetical concept in neuroscience

Dual consciousness (also known as dual mind or divided consciousness) is a hypothesis in neuroscience. It is proposed that it is possible that a person may develop two separate conscious entities within their one brain after undergoing a corpus callosotomy. The idea first began circulating in the neuroscience community after some split-brain patients exhibited alien hand syndrome (AHS), which led some scientists to believe that there must be two separate consciousnesses within the brain's left and right hemispheres in competition with one another once the corpus callosum is severed.

The idea of dual consciousness has caused controversy in the neuroscience community. No conclusive evidence of the proposed phenomenon has been discovered.

== Background ==
During the first half of the 20th century, some neurosurgeons concluded that the best option of treating severe epilepsy was by severing the patient's corpus callosum. The corpus callosum is the primary communication mechanism between the brain's two cerebral hemispheres. For example, communication across the corpus callosum allows information from both the left and right visual fields to be interpreted by the brain in a way that makes sense to comprehend the person's actual experience (e.g., visual inputs from both eyes are interpreted by the brain to make sense of the experience that you are looking at a computer that is directly in front of you). The procedure of surgically removing the corpus callosum is called a corpus callosotomy. Patients who have undergone a corpus callosotomy are colloquially referred to as "split-brain patients". This is because their brain's left and right hemispheres are no longer connected by the corpus callosum.

Split-brain patients have been subjects for numerous psychological experiments that sought to discover what occurs in the brain after the primary interhemispheric pathways have been disrupted. Notable researchers in the field include Roger Sperry, one of the first to publish ideas involving a dual consciousness; and his famous graduate student, Michael Gazzaniga. Their results found a pattern among patients: severing the entire corpus callosum stops the interhemispheric transfer of perceptual, sensory, motor, and other forms of information. For most cases, corpus callosotomies did not in any way affect patients' real-world functioning; however, those psychology experiments have demonstrated some differences between split-brain patients and other subjects.

== Split-brain patients and the corpus callosotomy ==
The first successful corpus callosotomies on humans were performed in the 1930s. The purpose of the procedure was to alleviate the effects of epilepsy when other forms of treatment (medications) had failed to stop the violent convulsions associated with the disorder. Epileptic seizures occur because of abnormal electrical discharges that spread across areas of the brain. William Van Wagenen proposed the idea of severing the corpus callosum to eliminate transcortical electrical signals across the brain's hemispheres. If this could be achieved, then the seizures should be reduced or even eliminated.

The general procedure of a corpus callosotomy is as follows. The patient is put under anesthesia. Once the patient is in deep sleep, a craniotomy is performed. This procedure removes a section of the skull, leaving the brain exposed and accessible to the surgeon. The dura mater is pulled back so the deeper areas of the brain, including the corpus callosum, can be seen. Specialized instruments are placed into the brain that allows safe severing of the corpus. Initially, a partial callosotomy is performed, which only severs the front two-thirds of the callosum. Though the corpus callosum loses a majority of its functioning during a partial callosotomy, it does not completely lose its capabilities; because the back section of the callosum is preserved, visual information is still sent across both hemispheres. If the operation does not succeed in reducing the seizures, a complete callosotomy is needed to reduce the severity of the seizures.

A similar type of procedure, known as a commissurotomy, involves severing a number of interhemispheric tracts (such as the anterior commissure, the hippocampal commissure and the massa intermedia of the thalamus) in addition to the corpus callosum.

After surgery, the split-brain patients are often given extensive neuropsychological assessments. One finding among split-brain patients is that many of them feel normal after the surgery and do not feel that their brains are "split". The corpus callosotomy and commissurotomy have been successful in reducing, and in some cases, eliminating epileptic seizures. This aligns with Van Wagenen's theory.

== Alien hand syndrome ==
Alien hand syndrome, sometimes used synonymously with anarchic hand, is a neurological disorder in which the afflicted person's hand appears to act on its own. Alien hand syndrome has been documented in some split-brain patients.

=== History ===
The first instance of alien hand syndrome was reported in 1908 by Kurt Goldstein. This incident occurred to a woman in her 50s whose left hand grabbed her throat without her making the effort to do so. She was able to remove her hand, but it took a great deal of effort to do so. Upon her death, an autopsy was performed which concluded that the event may have been caused by several strokes in her right hemisphere and corpus callosum. In the 1940s, reports surfaced of patients who had undergone corpus callosotomies that were experiencing uncontrollable hand movements following surgery. In these instances, the actions of one’s left hand conflicted with the actions of one’s right hand. The initial diagnosis for these experiences was "diagnostic dyspraxia".

There are three main types of alien hand syndrome. The first is the frontal variant, which is characterized by the nondominant hand grabbing items and manipulating objects. The second is the callosal variant, which is the most common and is characterized by the uncontrollable and conflicting movement of a right-handed patient’s left hand. Callosal alien hand syndrome often occurs alongside other symptoms of callosal damage such as alexia, the diminished or absent ability to comprehend written language, and visual anomia, the inability to name objects seen in the right vision field. The third type is the posterior variant, which is characterized by the affected hand rising in the air and making non-purposeful movements.

=== Symptoms ===
The classic sign of alien hand syndrome is that the affected person cannot control one of their hands. For example, if a split-brain patient with alien hand syndrome is asked to pick up a glass with their right hand, as the right hand moves over to the glass, the left hand will interfere with the action, thwarting the right hand's task. The interference from the left hand is completely out of the control of the patient and is not being done "on purpose". Affected patients at times cannot control the movements of their hands. Another example included patients unbuttoning a shirt with one hand, and the other hand simultaneously re-buttoning the shirt (although some reported feeling normal after their surgery). Switching one's attention from one task to another can also lessen the amount of control that they can allocate to their affected hand.

=== Relationship to dual consciousness ===
When scientists first started observing the alien hand syndrome in split-brain patients, they began to question the nature of consciousness and theorized that perhaps when the corpus callosum is cut, consciousness is also split into two separate entities. This development added to the general appeal of split-brain research.

== Gazzaniga and LeDoux's experiment ==
=== Procedure and results ===
In 1978, Michael Gazzaniga and Joseph LeDoux discovered a unique phenomenon among split-brain patients who were asked to perform a simultaneous concept task. The patient was shown two pictures: of a house in the winter time and of a chicken's claw. The pictures were positioned so they would exclusively be seen in only one visual field of the brain: the winter house was positioned so it would only be seen in the patient's left visual field (LVF), which corresponds to the brain's right hemisphere, and the chicken's claw was placed so it would only be seen in the patient's right visual field (RVF), which corresponds to the brain's left hemisphere.

A series of pictures was placed in front of the patients. Gazzaniga and LeDoux then asked the patient to choose a picture with his right hand and a picture with his left hand. The paradigm was set up so the choices would be obvious for the patients. A snow shovel is used for shoveling the snowy driveway of the winter house and a chicken's head correlates to the chicken's claw. The other pictures do not in any way correlate with the two original pictures. In the study, a patient chose the snow shovel with his left hand (corresponding to his brain's right hemisphere) and his right hand chose the chicken's head (corresponding to the brain's left hemisphere). When the patient was asked why he had chosen the pictures he had chosen, the answer he gave was "The chicken claw goes with the chicken head, and you need a snow shovel to clean out the chicken shed."

Both the winter house and the shovel were being projected to the patient from his LVF, so his right hemisphere received and processed the information; this input is completely independent from what is going on in the RVF, which involves the chicken's claw and head (the information being processed in the left hemisphere). The human brain's left hemisphere is primarily responsible for interpreting the meaning of the sensory input it receives from both fields; however, the patient's left hemisphere had no knowledge of the winter house. Because of this, the left hemisphere had to invent a logical reason for why the shovel was chosen. Since the only objects it had to work with are the chicken's claw and head, the left hemisphere interprets the meaning of choosing the shovel as "it is an object necessary to help the chicken, which lives in a shed, therefore, the shovel is used to clean the chicken’s shed". Gazzaniga famously coined the term left-brain interpreter to explain this phenomenon.

== Other experiments ==
=== Sperry–Gazzaniga ===
The Gazzaniga–LeDoux studies were based on previous studies done by Sperry and Gazzaniga. Sperry's experiment included a subject being seated at a table, with a shield blocking the visions from the subject's hands, including the objects on the table and the examiner seated across. The shield was also used as a viewing screen. On the shield, the examiner can select to present the visual material to both hemispheres or to selective hemispheres by means of having the viewing screen. The patient is briefly exposed to the stimuli on the viewing screen. The stimuli shown to the left eye goes to the right hemisphere, and the visual material shown to the right eye will be projected to the left hemisphere. During the experiment, when the stimulus was shown to the left side of the screen, the patient indicated he did not see anything. Patients have shown the inability to describe in writing or in speech the stimuli that was shown briefly to the left side. The speaking hemisphere, which in most people is the left hemisphere, would not have awareness of stimulus being shown to the right hemisphere (left visual field), except the left hand was able to point to the correct object. Based on his observations and data, Sperry concluded each hemisphere possessed its own consciousness.

=== Revonsuo ===
Antti Revonsuo explained a procedure that was similar in nature to the Sperry–Gazzaniga design. Split-brain patients were shown a picture with two objects: a flower and a rabbit. The flower is exclusively shown in the right visual field, which is interpreted by the left hemisphere; and the rabbit is exclusively shown in the left visual field, which is interpreted by the right hemisphere. The left brain sees the flower while the right brain is simultaneously viewing the rabbit. When the patients were asked what they saw, they said they only saw the flower and did not see the rabbit. The flower is in the right visual field and the left hemisphere can only see the flower. The left hemisphere dominates the interpretation of the stimulus and since it cannot see the rabbit (only being represented in the right hemisphere), patients do not believe they saw a rabbit. They can, however, still point to the rabbit with their left hand. Revonsuo stated that it seemed that one consciousness saw the flower and another consciousness saw the rabbit independently from one another.

=== Joseph ===
Rhawn Joseph observed two patients who had both undergone a complete corpus callosotomy. Joseph observed that the right hemisphere of one of the patients is able to gather, comprehend, and express information. The right hemisphere was able to direct activity to the patient's left arm and leg. The execution of the left arm and leg's action as was inhibited by the left hemisphere. Joseph found that the patient's left leg would attempt to move forward as if to walk straight but the right leg would either refuse to move or begin to walk in the opposite direction. After observing the struggles of the execution of activities involving the left and right arms and legs, Joseph was led to believe that the two hemispheres each possessed their own consciousness.

Joseph also noted that the patient had other specific instances of conflict between the right and left hemispheres including, the left hand (right hemisphere) carrying out actions contrary to the left hemisphere's motives, such as the left hand turning off the television immediately after the right hand turned it on. Joseph found that the patient's left leg would only allow the patient to return home when the patient was going for a walk and would reject continuing to go for that walk.

==== Further observations by Joseph ====
In the laboratory, a patient was given two different fabrics: a wire screen in his left hand and a piece of sandpaper in his right hand. The patient received two different fabrics out of his view so that neither eye nor hemisphere visually saw what his hands were given. When the patient was indicating what fabric was in the left hand, he was able to correctly indicate and point with the left hand to the wire screen after it had been set on a table. As he pointed with his left hand, however, the right hand tried to stop the left hand and make the left hand point to the fabric that the right hand was holding. The left hand continued to point at the correct fabric, even though the right hand tried to forcefully move the left hand. During the struggle, the patient also verbalized feelings of animosity by saying, "That’s wrong!" and "I hate this hand." Joseph concluded that the left hemisphere did not understand at all why the left hand (right hemisphere) would point to a different material.

== Controversy and alternative explanations ==
The most powerful arguments against the dual consciousness theory are:

- There is no universally accepted definition of "consciousness".
- Split-brain patients are not the only people to exhibit alien hand syndrome. It has been observed in people with intact brains who have suffered a stroke, in patients with Alzheimer's disease, and in patients with brain tumors.
- Other existing and established neurological mechanisms can account for an explanation of the same phenomena.

Gonzalo Munevar has proposed an alternative explanation to demonstrate that these strange behaviors are spawned from areas in the brain and not by a dual consciousness. Two cortical areas in particular, the supplementary motor area (SMA) and the premotor cortex (PMC), are crucial in the planning of executing motor tasks to external stimuli presented in the person's perceptual field. For example, a person may pick up a glass of water with their right hand and put it up to their lips for a drink. The person may have picked up the glass with their right hand, but well before this action takes place, the PMC and SMA consider a variety of different possibilities of how this action could be performed. They could have picked it up with their left hand, their mouth, or their foot. They could have done it quickly or slowly. Many possibilities are entertained, but few are actually executed. These actions are sent from the PMC to the Motor Cortex for execution. The rest are inhibited by the SMA and are not performed.

The processes of the SMA and PMC are done unconsciously. The SMA and PMC consider the many alternative actions many milliseconds before the chosen action takes place. The person is never consciously aware of these alternative possibilities the brain has considered before they pick it up with the right hand; they just do it. The action of picking up the glass with the right hand is also performed unconsciously. It may be preferable to use their right hand because they are right-handed, and doing so is therefore more comfortable; alternatively, the glass may be placed to their right, and the possibility that expends the least amount of energy is using the right hand to pick it up.

Another important fact about the PMC is that its activation is bilateral. When it is activated, it is activated in both hemispheres of the brain. Gazzaniga observed and wrote about this phenomenon. When the corpus callosum is severed, many interhemispheric interactions are disrupted. Many areas of the brain become compromised, including the SMA. If the SMA has trouble regulating and inhibiting the actions of the PMC, it is possible that conflicting sets of actions may be sent to the MC and performed (accounting for both hands reaching for the glass, even if only one hand is intended to grab it). It would make the appearance that there is a dual consciousness competing for dominance over the other for control of the brain, but it is not the case.

The disappearance of alien hand syndrome in some split-brain patients is not evidence of one consciousness "defeating" the other and taking complete control of the brain. It is likely that the plasticity of the brain may be the cause for alleviating the disorder. Eventually the split patient's brain may find adaptive routes to compensate for the lost interhemispheric communication, such as alternative pathways involving subcortical structures that perform subcortical interhemispheric inhibition to regain a sense of normalcy between the two hemispheres.

== Models of multiple consciousnesses ==
Michael Gazzaniga, while working on the model of dual consciousness, came to the conclusion that simple dual consciousness (i.e. right-brain/left-brain model of the mind) is an oversimplification, and the brain is organized into hundreds or even thousands of modular-processing systems.

The theory of a division of consciousness was touched upon by Carl Jung in 1935 when he stated, "The so-called unity of consciousness is an illusion ... we like to think that we are one but we are not."

Similar models which hypothesize that mind is formed from many smaller agents (i.e. the brain is made up of a constellation of independent or semi-independent agents) were also described by:

- Marvin Minsky's "Society of Mind" model suggests that mind is built up from the interactions of simple parts called agents, which are themselves mindless.
- Thomas R. Blakeslee described his model as "brain is composed of hundreds of independent centers of thought called 'modules'".
- Neurocluster Brain Model describes the brain as a massively parallel computing machine in which a huge number of neuroclusters process information independently from each other. The neurocluster which most of the time has the access to actuators (i.e. neurocluster which most of the time acts upon an environment using actuators) is called the main personality. Other neuroclusters which do not have access to actuators or which have only short duration and limited access to actuators are called "autonomous neuroclusters".
- Michio Kaku described the brain model using the analogy of large corporation which is controlled by CEO.
- Robert E. Ornstein wrote that "the mind is a squadron of simpletons".
- Ernest Hilgard described neodissociationist theory in which a "hidden observer" is created in the mind while hypnosis is taking place and this hidden observer has his own separate consciousness.
- George Ivanovich Gurdjieff in year 1915 taught his students that "man has no single, big I; man is divided into a multiplicity of small I’s".

== See also ==
- Bicameral mentality – Hypothesis in psychology
- Binding problem – Unanswered question in the study of consciousness
- Cognitive neuroscience – Study of the neural mechanisms of cognition
- Divided consciousness – American psychologist (1904–2001)
- Laterality – Preference most humans show for one side of their body over the other
- Lateralization of brain function – Specialization of some cognitive functions in one side of the brain
- Mind-body problem – Open question in philosophy of how abstract minds interact with physical bodies
- Of Two Minds – 1998 book; 2nd edition: 2021
- Open individualism – Theory of personal identity
- Philosophy of mind – Branch of philosophy
- Theory of mind – Ability to attribute mental states to oneself and others
- Vertiginous question – Philosophical question about personal identity
