= Fredric Schiffer =

American psychiatrist

- Occupation: psychiatrist
- Known for: Dual-Brain Psychology
- Website: dualbrainpsychology.com

Fredric Schiffer is an American psychiatrist and medical researcher who has developed a psychological technique and therapeutic approach which he terms "dual-brain psychology." From his experience in counseling individuals, Schiffer found that some individuals would behave like they have "two sides" to their personality-- "one calm and accepting, and another more emotional and impulsive.". When other researchers had shown that different emotional responses could be elicited by showing a movie to one-half of the brain (to one cerebral hemisphere) Schiffer then found by having a patient cover the eyes in a way to be able to look only from the extreme left side of the head, or only from the extreme right side of the head, that some patients would be more calm when looking out one side, and more agitated or upset when looking out the opposite side. It is known that such an arrangement of covering the eyes directs the visual input to one hemisphere, either to the right hemisphere or to the left hemisphere, depending on how the eyes are covered. Schiffer "maintains that one hemisphere can be more immature than the other and that this imbalance leads to different mental disorders." Schiffer writes that "the aim of dual-brain therapy is to mend the archaic, destructive ideas and emotions of the mind on the troubled side, to teach it that it is safer and more valuable than it learned during some traumatic experiences."

== Biography ==
=== Education ===
Fredric Schiffer received his medical degree (MD) in 1971 from the Drexel University School of Medicine, in Philadelphia. He then completed three years of training in Internal Medicine at Hahnemann Medical College and Hospital, also in Philadelphia. Then immediately afterwards he completed a two-year fellowship in Cardiology via a hospital associated with Harvard Medical School. Following the training in cardiology, in 1978 he completed a three-year residency in Psychiatry at McLean Hospital, Harvard Medical School.

=== Current position ===
Fredric Schiffer is a Research Associate at McLean Hospital and a part-time Assistant Professor of Psychiatry at Harvard Medical School. He also maintains a private psychiatric counseling practice.

== Dual-Brain Psychology ==
Fredric Schiffer uses a technique of having the patient alternately cover all of one eye, and the inner half of the other eye. When a patient is looking out of the extreme left side of the head, or from the extreme right side of the head, he finds that "some patients with depression and post-traumatic stress syndrome [for example], see the world differently, depending on whether they look at it through the outer half of their left or right eye." Schiffer says that "one depressed patient, for example, rates himself as 'friendly and important' while seeing the world through his right visual field. [But] when he looks at the world through his left visual field, he rates himself as helpless, lonely, and sad. Said another way, the two parts [the two hemispheres] of the brain can give people different opinions of themselves." Schiffer goes on to say that "I don't do...[lateralized vision] therapy. [The lateralized vision is]...just a tool I use as an adjunct to traditional psychotherapy. [Looking out one side or the other can]...sometimes assist in freeing a patient who gets stuck at a certain point in therapy, and they can be useful in providing insights to a patient about his or her problems."

== Published works ==
=== Books ===
- Schiffer, Fredric (1998). Of Two Minds: The Revolutionary Science of Dual-Brain Psychology. The Free Press (an imprint of Simon & Schuster); 2nd edition 2021. ISBN 978-0684854243.
- Schiffer, Fredric (2024). Good-bye Anxiety, Depression, Addiction & PTSD: The Life-Changing Science of Dual-Brain Psychology. Stoneway Press. ISBN 979-8991040310.

=== Selected scientific papers ===
- Fredric Schiffer, et al. "Different Psychological Status in the Two Hemispheres of Two Split-Brain Patients" (Neuropsychiatry, Neuropsychology, and Behavioral Neurology, Vol 11, No.3, pp. 151–156; 1998)
- Fredric Schiffer. "A Dual Mind Approach to Understanding the Conscious Self and Its Treatment" (NeuroSci, 9 June 2021)
- Fredric Schiffer. "Dual-Brain Psychology: A novel theory and treatment based on cerebral laterality and psychopathology" (Front. Psychol., 19 October 2022)

== See also ==
- Adverse childhood experiences
- Dual consciousness
- Neuropsychoanalysis
