= Ernest Hilgard =

American psychologist (1904–2001)

Ernest Ropiequet Hilgard
- Born: July 25, 1904; Belleville, Illinois
- Died: October 22, 2001 (aged 97); Palo Alto, California
- Education: University of Illinois Urbana-Champaign; Yale University
- Known for: Hypnosis, Atkinson & Hilgard's Introduction to Psychology
- Spouse: Josephine R. Hilgard
- Children: 2
- Awards: NAS Award for Scientific Reviewing (1984)
- Scientific career
- Fields: Psychology
- Workplaces: Stanford University
- Doctoral advisor: Raymond Dodge
- Doctoral students: Lloyd Humphreys; Wayne H. Holtzman; Angus Campbell; Charles Tart

Ernest Ropiequet "Jack" Hilgard (July 25, 1904 – October 22, 2001) was an American psychologist and professor at Stanford University. He became famous in the 1950s for his research on hypnosis, especially with regard to pain control. Along with André Muller Weitzenhoffer, Hilgard developed the Stanford Hypnotic Susceptibility Scales. A Review of General Psychology survey, published in 2002, ranked Hilgard as the 29th most cited psychologist of the 20th century.

== Biography ==
Born in Belleville, Illinois, Ernest Ropiequet Hilgard was the son of a physician, Dr. George Engelmann Hilgard, and Laura Ropiequet Hilgard. Hilgard was initially drawn to engineering; he received a bachelor's degree in chemical engineering from the University of Illinois Urbana-Champaign in 1924. He then studied psychology, receiving a Ph.D. from Yale University in 1930. He was elected a Fellow of the American Academy of Arts and Sciences in 1958. In 1969, he was elected to the American Philosophical Society. In 1984 Hilgard was awarded the NAS Award for Scientific Reviewing from the National Academy of Sciences, of which he was also a member.

Hilgard met fellow psychologist Josephine Rohrs at Yale; they married in 1931 and had two children, Henry (born 1936) and Elizabeth Ann (born 1944). Hilgard died in 2001 in Palo Alto, California, at the age of 97.

During World War II, he worked as a civilian in the Offices of War Information and Civil Requirements in Washington, DC and in the Bureau of Overseas Intelligence.

== Hidden observer in hypnosis ==
Hilgard is specifically known for his theory that a so-called "hidden observer" is created in the mind while hypnosis is taking place. His research on the hidden observer during hypnotic pain management was intended to provide support for his neodissociationist theory. This theory held that a person undergoing hypnosis can still observe his or her own pain without consciously experiencing any suffering. The phenomenon of the "hidden observer" was controversial and critics claimed it could be manufactured by suggestions, indicating that it was possibly no more than an artifact of the instructions given to the research participants. Writing in the late 1970s (Hilgard, E. (1977). Divided consciousness: Multiple controls in human thought and action. New York, New York: Wiley), Ernest Hilgard became convinced that we all have another being sharing our lives. Hilgard termed this entity the hidden observer.

In one of his books, Hilgard described a classic test demonstrating how this hidden entity is part of our consciousness. He wrote of a blind student who was hypnotized and, while in a trance state, was told that he would become deaf. The suggestion was so strong that he failed to react to any form of noise, even large sounds next to his ear. Of course, he also failed to respond to any questions he was asked while in his trance state. The hypnotist was keen to discover if anybody else was able to hear. He quietly said to the student, Perhaps there is some part of you that is hearing my voice and processing the information. If there is, I should like the index finger of your right hand to rise as a sign that this is the case(Hilgard, 1977, page 186). The finger rose. At this, the student requested that he be brought out of the hypnotically induced period of deafness.

On being awakened, the student said that he had requested to come out of the trance state because I felt my finger rise in a way that was not a spontaneous twitch, so you must have done something to make it rise, and I want to know what you did (page 186). The hypnotist then asked him what he remembered. Because the trance was light, the student never actually lost consciousness; all that occurred was that his hearing had ceased. In order to deal with the boredom of being deprived of both sight and sound, he had decided to work on some statistical problems in his head. It was while he was doing this that he suddenly felt his finger lift. This was obviously strange to him, because under normal circumstances he was, like all of us, the person who decides on how the body moves. In this case he was not. Not only that, but somebody else in his head was responding to an external request that he had not heard. As far as Hilgard was concerned, the person who responded was the hidden observer.

One of Hilgard's subjects made the following interesting statement about what she experienced, making particular reference to what she sensed was her higher self: The hidden observer is cognizant of everything that is going on ... The hidden observer sees more, he questions more, he's aware of what is going on all of the time but getting in touch is totally unnecessary ... He's like a guardian angel that guards you from doing anything that will mess you up ... The hidden observer is looking through the tunnel, and sees everything in the tunnel ... Unless someone tells me to get in touch with the hidden observer I'm not in contact. It's just there. (Hilgard, 1977, page 210) The hidden observer protects us from doing anything in hypnosis that we would not do under any circumstance consciously, such as causing someone else physical harm.

== Divided consciousness ==
Divided consciousness is a term coined by Hilgard to define a psychological state in which one's consciousness is split into distinct components, possibly during hypnosis. The theory of a division of consciousness was touched upon by Carl Jung in 1935 when he stated, "The so-called unity of consciousness is an illusion ... we like to think that we are one but we are not." Ernest Hilgard believed that hypnosis causes a split in awareness and a vivid form of everyday mind splits. Drawing themes from Pierre Janet, Hilgard viewed hypnosis from this perspective as a willingness to divide the main systems of consciousness into different sectors. He argued that this split in consciousness can not only help define the state of mind reached during hypnosis, but can also help to define a vast range of psychological issues such as dissociative identity disorder.

In Hilgard's Divided Consciousness Reconsidered, he offers many examples of "dissociated" human behavior. With regard to theory, he does state that it is useful to assign two modes of consciousness, a receptive mode and an active mode—that is, a bimodal consciousness. In other places he mentions the concept of coconsciousness, wherein two or more states of consciousness may be equally receptive or active, as, for example, in some types of dissociative personalities.

Many psychological studies assume a unity of consciousness. Doubt is cast on this assumption by psychophysical studies in normal subjects and those with blindsight showing the simultaneous dissociation of different modes of reporting of a sensation, and by clinical studies of anosognosic patients showing dissociations of awareness of their own states. These and other phenomena are interpreted to imply two kinds of division of consciousness: the separation of phenomenal experience from reflexive consciousness and the non-unity of reflexive consciousness. Reflexive consciousness is taken to be necessary for report and is associated with ‘the self’ as the subject of experience and its own agent of reporting. Reflexive consciousness is operative only when we attend to our own states. When we are involved in the world, reflexivity intervenes less and our consciousness is more unified.

Some experimental work, such as one performed on 169 undergraduate students, some of whom performed tasks in selective attention and divided attention conditions being correlated with scores on the Harvard Group Scale of Hypnotic Susceptibility—refute Hilgard's findings.

The organizing principles that constitute human consciousness and other mental phenomena may be described by analysis and reconstruction of the underlying dynamics of psychophysiological measures.

== Duality of personality ==
This idea of the basic duality of human personality is culturally and historically almost universal. The ancient Chinese called these two independent consciousnesses hun and po, the ancient Egyptians the ka and the ba, and the ancient Greeks the Daemon and the Eidolon. In each case, the two entities shared their senses and perceptions of the external world but interpreted those perceptions with regard to their own history, knowledge, and personality.

For the Greeks, the relationship was an unequal one. The higher self, the Daemon, acted as a form of guardian angel or higher self over its lower self, the Eidolon. The Stoic philosopher Epictetus wrote: God has placed at every man's side a guardian, the Daemon of each man, who is charged to watch over him; a Daemon that cannot sleep, nor be deceived. To what greater and more watchful guardian could He have entrusted each of us? So, when you have shut the doors, and made darkness in the house, remember, never to say that you are alone; for you are not alone. But God is there, and your Daemon is there (Epictetus, 1998/2nd century, 14:11) The belief was that the Daemon had foreknowledge of future circumstances and events and as such could warn its Eidolon of the dangers. It was as if in some way the Daemon had already lived the life of its Eidolon.

== Textbooks ==
Hilgard was also the author of three hugely influential textbooks on topics other than hypnosis. The first, "Conditioning and Learning", jointly authored with Donald Marquis, was very widely cited up until the 1960s. When Gregory Kimble updated a second edition in 1961, Hilgard and Marquis's names were made part of the title, a distinction, as Hilgard himself noted, usually reserved for deceased authors.

A second text, "Theories of Learning" (1948), was also widely cited, and lasted for five editions (through 1981); the last three editions involved Hilgard's Stanford colleague Gordon H. Bower.

The third textbook was the well written and wide-ranging "Introduction to Psychology" (1953), which was, according to his biography on the website of the American Psychological Association, "for a long period, the most widely used introductory psychology text in the world." Several editions were co-authored by Rita L. Atkinson or Richard C. Atkinson, another colleague at Stanford and later chancellor of the University of California at San Diego and then president and regent of the University of California. The 15th edition, published in 2009, is called "Atkinson and Hilgard's Introduction to Psychology".

== Publications ==
- Hilgard E.R. and Marquis D.G 1940. Conditioning and learning. New York: Appleton-Century.
  - Hilgard E.R. and Marquis D.G. 1961. Conditioning and learning. 2nd edition, Prentice-Hall. ISBN 978-0-13-388876-8
- Hilgard E.R. 1948. Theories of learning. New York: Appleton-Century-Crofts.
  - Hilgard E.R. and Bower G.H. 1966. Theories of learning. 3rd edition, New York: Appleton-Century-Crofts.
- Hilgard E.R. 1965. Susceptibility to hypnosis. New York: Harcourt Brace Jovanovich.
- Hilgard E.R. 1953, 1970. Introduction to psychology. Harcourt. ISBN 0-15-543646-5
  - Hilgard E.R., Atkinson R.L. and Atkinson R.C. 1975. Introduction to psychology. Harcourt Brace Jovanovich. ISBN 0-15-543657-0
- Hilgard E.R. 1977. Divided consciousness: multiple controls in human thought and action. New York, New York: Wiley. ISBN 978-0-471-39602-4
  - Hilgard E.R. 1986. Divided consciousness: multiple controls in human thought and action (expanded edition). New York, NY: Wiley. ISBN 0-471-80572-6
- Hilgard E.R. 1987. Psychology in America: a historical survey. San Diego: Harcourt Brace Jovanovich.
- Hilgard E.R. and J. Hilgard. 1994. Hypnosis in the relief of pain. Revised edition Philadelphia: Brunner/Mazel.

== See also ==
- Alien hand syndrome
- Bicameral mentality
- Brain asymmetry
- Dual consciousness
- Divided consciousness
- Cognitive Neuroscience
- Folk psychology
- Ideomotor phenomenon
- Julian Jaynes
- Laterality
- Lateralization of brain function
- Left brain interpreter
- Mind-body problem
- Parallel computing
- Philosophy of mind
- Society of Mind
- Split-brain
- Theory of mind
