= Gregory Kimble =

American psychologist

- Born: Gregory Adams Kimble; October 21, 1917; Mason City, Iowa
- Died: January 15, 2006 (aged 88); Durham, North Carolina
- Education: University of Iowa (Ph.D., 1945)
- Awards: 1996 Ernest R. Hilgard Lifetime Achievement Award from Division 1 of the American Psychological Association; 1998/1999 Award for Distinguished Career Contributions to Education and Training from the American Psychological Association
- Scientific career
- Fields: Psychology
- Institutions: Duke University
- Thesis: Classical conditioning as a function of the time between conditioned and unconditioned stimuli (1945)
- Doctoral advisor: Kenneth W. Spence

Gregory Adams Kimble (October 21, 1917 – January 15, 2006) was an American general psychologist and a professor at Duke University, a position from which he retired in 1984. He was known for his efforts to unify psychology as a single scientific discipline, and for his lifelong devotion to behaviorism. He also served as an advisor to the magazine Psychology Today in the 1980s, when it was owned by the American Psychological Association (APA), of which he became a fellow in 1951. His positions at the APA itself included presidency of its Divisions of General Psychology and Experimental Psychology. He received the APA's Award for Distinguished Career Contributions to Education and Training in 1999, as well as the C. Alan Boneau Award from the APA's Division of General Psychology.
