= Split-brain =

Condition of the human brain

Split-brain or callosal syndrome is a type of disconnection syndrome when the corpus callosum connecting the two hemispheres of the brain is severed to some degree. It is an association of symptoms produced by disruption of, or interference with, the connection between the hemispheres of the brain. The surgical operation to produce this condition (corpus callosotomy) involves transection of the corpus callosum, and is usually a last resort to treat refractory epilepsy. Initially, partial callosotomies are performed; if this operation does not succeed, a complete callosotomy is performed to mitigate the risk of accidental physical injury by reducing the severity and violence of epileptic seizures. Before using callosotomies, epilepsy is instead treated through pharmaceutical means. After surgery, neuropsychological assessments are often performed.

After the right and left brain are separated, each hemisphere will have its own separate perception, concepts, and impulses to act. Having two "brains" in one body inspire self-contradictory actions. There was a case in which, when one split-brain patient would dress himself, sometimes he pulled his pants up with one hand (the side of his brain that wanted to get dressed) and down with the other (the side that did not). He was also reported to have grabbed his wife with his left hand and shook her violently, at which point his right hand came to her aid and grabbed the aggressive left hand (a phenomenon sometimes occurring, known as alien hand syndrome). However, such conflicts are very rare. If a conflict arises, one hemisphere usually overrides the other.

When split-brain patients are shown an image only in the left half of each eye's visual field, they cannot verbally name what they have seen. This is because the brain's experiences of the senses is contralateral. Communication between the two hemispheres is inhibited, so the patient cannot say out loud the name of that which the right side of the brain is seeing. A similar effect occurs if a split-brain patient touches an object with only the left hand while receiving no visual cues in the right visual field; the patient will be unable to name the object, as each cerebral hemisphere of the primary somatosensory cortex only contains a tactile representation of the opposite side of the body. If the speech-control center is on the right side of the brain, the same effect can be achieved by presenting the image or object to only the right visual field or hand.

The same effect occurs for visual pairs and reasoning. For example, a patient with split brain is shown a picture of a chicken foot and a snowy field in separate visual fields and asked to choose from a list of words the best association with the pictures. The patient would choose a chicken to associate with the chicken foot and a shovel to associate with the snow; however, when asked to reason why the patient chose the shovel, the response would relate to the chicken (e.g. "the shovel is for cleaning out the chicken coop").

== History ==
Early anatomists, Galen and Vesalius, recognized the corpus callosum and predicted that it connected the left and right hemispheres of the brain. In 1784, Félix Vicq-d'Azyr believed that it helped facilitate communication between the two hemispheres and that removing it would separate the brain into two independent regions. Then, in 1892, Joseph Jules Dejerine had a patient with damage to both the corpus callosum and visual cortex. The patient could write, but would not read; this condition is known as Dejerine syndrome. In 1908, Hugo Liepmann found that by lesioning the corpus callosum, the left sided brain could then result in apraxia and agraphia. These conditions impact the ability to carry out daily coordinated movements, such as writing.

Walter Dandy was a neurosurgeon who performed the first partial corpus callostomies. He did this as a surgical approach for pineal tumors. In 1936, he reported three cases where he sectioned the posterior two-thirds of the corpus callosum. He found that the procedure did not result in much blood loss and there were little-to-none postoperative deficits. He argued that his findings challenge previous claims about the functional importance of the brain region.

Before the 1960s, clinical observations of patients with left-hemisphere lesions supported the idea that language functions were localized primarily to that hemisphere. The lesions to this region resulted in difficulty with speech production, comprehension, and reading. Additionally, research performed by Roger Sperry and his colleagues later suggested that severing interhemispheric connections to treat severe epilepsy was revealed by functional capacities in the right hemisphere. Together they demonstrated that a disconnected right hemisphere could handle basic language tasks and was stronger in processing spatial information, music and emotional content. On the other hand, the isolated left hemisphere functioned for analytical reasoning and full language abilities. Sperry earned the 1981 Nobel Prize in Physiology or Medicine for his contributions in hemispheric specialization.

Sperry initiated split-brain research and his colleague, Michael Gazzaniga, helped him summarize their findings. Their report in the 1967 Scientific American report titled, "The Split Brain in Man," examined how the two hemispheres function independently of one another after a corpus callosotomy. This is a surgical procedure used to treat severe epilepsy by severing the corpus callosum. Ten patients had undergone the surgery at that time and four were participants in their research studies. The patients showed distinct cognitive patterns, yet their personalities and emotions were still intact. Sperry and Gazzaniga analyzed these changes using tests involving visual input, tactile input, and combined visual and tactile processing.

=== Visual test ===
Participants fixated on the center of a light board while bulbs flashes in both visual fields. They were asked to report what they saw and they described only the lights presented to the right visual field. They were asked to point to the flashed lights and they could accurately indicate lights on both sides. Each hemisphere has received the visual information, but only the left hemisphere could verbally report it. These results demonstrated that verbal acknowledgement of a visual stimulus requires communication between the visual processing system and the left hemisphere region.

=== Tactile test ===
Participants held an object in one hand without seeing it. When it was in the right hand, the left side of the brain could recognize it and say what it was. When it was in the left hand, the right side could tell what it was but couldn't say it. The person also couldn't pick the object out from similar ones. This shows the right side could feel the object but couldn't use words to describe it.

=== Combination of both tests ===
Images were presented to the right hemisphere only. Participants could not name or describe the pictures. They then explored the objects with the left hand and they correctly selected the object that matched the image. Participants could also choose items related to the picture if the exact object was not available. This further confirms that the right hemisphere can process the visual information but cannot access language systems.

Later, Sperry and Gazzaniga expanded their own research and testing. This focused more on the right hemisphere's contributions to language, auditory processing, and emotional responses. Their work showed that each hemisphere has distinct cognitive functions. The left hemisphere functioned in language, writing, reading, and math. The right hemisphere functioned in spatial processing, facial recognition, and problem solving.

Sperry studied split-brain research until he passed away in 1994. Gazzaniga continued his studies. Later studies challenged some of their conclusions. In the 1980s, Jarre Levy argued that the hemispheres function in an integrated way and that no cognitive task relies on only one side of the brain. In 1998, a study by Hommet and Billiard reported that humans born without a corpus callosum showed information transfer between the two hemispheres. This suggests that subcortical pathways remain in these patients, but it is not clear if they remain in the split-brain patients. Research performed by Parsons, Gabrieli, Phelps, and Gazzaniga in 1998 indicated that interhemispheric communication is important for mentally simulating others' movement. In 2001, Morin's research on inner speech suggested that commissurotomy may produce two asymmetric forms of self-awareness. Meaning there is a more complete system in the left hemisphere and a more primitive system in the right hemisphere.

== Hemispheric specialization ==
The two hemispheres of the cerebral cortex are linked by the corpus callosum, through which they communicate and coordinate actions and decisions. Communication and coordination between the two hemispheres is essential because each hemisphere has some separate functions. The right hemisphere of the cortex excels at nonverbal and spatial tasks, whereas the left hemisphere is more dominant in verbal tasks, such as speaking and writing. The right hemisphere controls the primary sensory functions of the left side of the body. In a cognitive sense the right hemisphere is responsible for recognizing objects and timing, and in an emotional sense it is responsible for empathy, humor and depression. On the other hand, the left hemisphere controls the primary sensory functions of the right side of the body and is responsible for scientific and math skills, and logic. The extent of specialized brain function by an area remains under investigation. It is claimed that the difference between the two hemispheres is that the left hemisphere is "analytic" or "logical" while the right hemisphere is "holistic" or "intuitive". Many simple tasks, especially comprehension of inputs, require functions that are specific to both the right and left hemispheres and together form a one-direction systematized way of creating an output through the communication and coordination that occurs between hemispheres.

=== Role of the corpus callosum ===
The corpus callosum, highlighted in red, is the main neural pathway between the two hemispheres.

The corpus callosum is a structure in the brain along the longitudinal fissure that facilitates much of the communication between the two hemispheres. This structure is composed of white matter: millions of axons that have their dendrites and terminal boutons projecting in both the right and left hemisphere. However, there is evidence that the corpus callosum may also have some inhibitory functions. Post-mortem research on human and monkey brains shows that the corpus callosum is functionally organized. This organization results in modality-specific regions of the corpus callosum that are responsible for the transfer of different types of information. Research has revealed that the anterior midbody transfers motor information, the posterior midbody transfers somatosensory information, the isthmus transfers auditory information, and the splenium transfers visual information. Although much of the inter-hemispheric transfer occurs at the corpus callosum, there are trace amounts of transfer via commissural pathways, such as the anterior commissure, posterior commissure, habenular commissure, and the hippocampal commissure.

Studies of the effects on the visual pathway on split-brained patients has revealed that there is a redundancy gain (the ability of target detection to benefit from multiple copies of the target) in simple reaction time. In a simple response to visual stimuli, split-brained patients experience a faster reaction time to bilateral stimuli than predicted by model. A model proposed by Iacoboni et al. suggests split-brained patients experience asynchronous activity that causes a stronger signal, and thus a decreased reaction time. Iacoboni also suggests there exists dual attention in split-brained patients, which implies that each cerebral hemisphere has its own attentional system. An alternative approach taken by Reuter-Lorenz et al. suggests that enhanced redundancy gain in the split brain is primarily due to a slowing of responses to unilateral stimuli, rather than a speeding of responses to bilateral ones.

The simple reaction time in split-brained patients, even with enhanced redundancy gain, is slower than the reaction time of normal adults.

=== Functional plasticity ===
Following a stroke or other injury to the brain, functional deficiencies are common. The deficits are expected to be in areas related to the part of the brain that has been damaged; if a stroke has occurred in the motor cortex, deficits may include paralysis, abnormal posture, or abnormal movement synergies. Significant recovery occurs during the first several weeks after the injury. However, recovery is generally thought not to continue past six months. If a specific region of the brain is injured or destroyed, its functions can sometimes be transferred and taken over by a neighboring region. There is little functional plasticity observed in partial and complete callosotomies; however, much more plasticity can be seen in infant patients receiving a hemispherectomy, which suggests that the opposite hemisphere can adapt some functions typically performed by its opposite pair. A study performed by Anderson et al. (2005) proved a correlation between the severity of the injury, the age of the individual, and their cognitive performance. It was evident that there was more neuroplasticity in older children—even if their injury was extremely severe—than in infants who suffered moderate brain injury. In some incidents of any moderate to severe brain injury, it mostly causes developmental impairments and in some of the most severe injuries it can cause a profound impact on their development that can lead to long-term cognitive effects. In the aging brain, it is extremely uncommon for neuroplasticity to occur; "olfactory bulb and hippocampus are two regions of the mammalian brain in which mutations preventing adult neurogenesis were never beneficial, or simply never occurred".

=== Corpus callosotomy ===
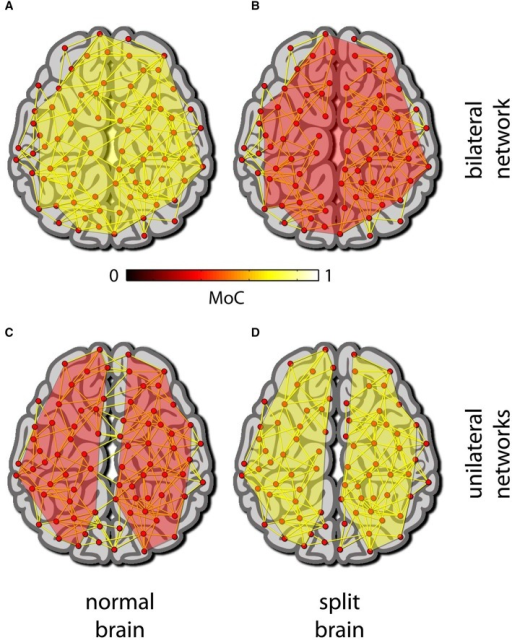
The picture is about a normal brain and a person with a split brain

Corpus callosotomy is a surgical procedure that sections the corpus callosum, resulting in either the partial or complete disconnection between the two hemispheres. It is typically used as a last-resort measure in treatment of intractable epilepsy. The modern procedure typically involves only the anterior third of the corpus callosum; however, if the epileptic seizures continue, the following third is lesioned prior to the remaining third if the seizures persist. This results in a complete callosotomy in which most of the information transfer between hemispheres is lost.

Due to the functional mapping of the corpus callosum, a partial callosotomy has fewer detrimental effects because it leaves parts of the corpus callosum intact. There is little functional plasticity observed in partial and complete callosotomies on adults; the most neuroplasticity is seen in young children but not in infants.

It is known that when the corpus callosum is severed during an experimental procedure, the experimenter can ask each side of the brain the same question and receive two different answers. When the experimenter asks the right visual field / left hemisphere what they see the participant will respond verbally, whereas if the experimenter asks the left visual field / right hemisphere what they see the participant will not be able to respond verbally but will pick up the appropriate object with their left hand.

=== Memory ===
It is known that the right and the left hemisphere have different functions when it comes to memory. The right hemisphere is better at recognizing objects and faces, recalling knowledge that the individual has already learned, or recalling images already seen. The left hemisphere is better at mental manipulation, language production, and semantic priming but was more susceptible to memory confusion than the right hemisphere. The main issue for individuals that have undergone a callosotomy is that because the function of memory is split into two major systems, the individual is more likely to become confused between knowledge they already know and information that they have only inferred.

In tests, memory in either hemisphere of split-brained patients is generally lower than normal, though better than in patients with amnesia, suggesting that the forebrain commissures are important for the formation of some kinds of memory. This suggests that posterior callosal sections that include the hippocampal commissures cause a mild memory deficit (in standardized free-field testing) involving recognition. This makes first-person accounts hard to consider and to assess as scientists do not know if the consciousness was split as well.

=== Control ===
In general, split-brained patients behave in a coordinated, purposeful, and consistent manner, despite the independent, parallel, usually different, and occasionally conflicting processing of the same information from the environment by the two disconnected hemispheres. When two hemispheres receive competing stimuli at the same time, the response mode tends to determine which hemisphere controls behavior.

Often, split-brained patients are indistinguishable from normal adults. This is due to the compensatory phenomena; split-brained patients progressively acquire a variety of strategies to get around their interhemispheric transfer deficits. One issue that can happen with their body control is that one side of the body is doing the opposite of the other side, called the intermanual effect.

=== Attention ===
Experiments on covert orienting of spatial attention using the Posner paradigm confirm the existence of two different attentional systems in the two hemispheres. The right hemisphere was found superior to the left hemisphere on modified versions of spatial relations tests and in locations testing, whereas the left hemisphere was more object based. The components of mental imagery are differentially specialized: the right hemisphere was found superior for mental rotation, the left hemisphere superior for image generation. It was also found that the right hemisphere paid more attention to landmarks and scenes whereas the left hemisphere paid more attention to exemplars of categories.

=== Surgery procedure ===
The surgical operation to produce this condition (Corpus callosotomy) involves transection of the corpus callosum, and is usually a last resort to treat refractory epilepsy. To lower the degree and ferocity of epileptic convulsions, partial callosotomies are first done; if these are unsuccessful, a callosotomy is next carried out to reduce the risk of unintentional bodily harm. Epilepsy is first managed with medications rather than callosotomies.

== Case studies of split-brain patients ==
Sperry first trialed the procedure on cats and monkeys before moving to humans. For both cats and monkeys, he found that after disconnecting the left and right hemispheres, they would not depend on each other, but function independently. When testing this procedure on humans, he found different results that has increased complexity. Sperry found that in humans, the left hemisphere of the brain functions in language processing, but the right hemisphere processes spatial information. Neuropsychological evaluations following surgery are frequently carried out including visual and tacticle tests. Case studies of split-brain patient primarily focused on the idea of split consciousness. The patients' vision and touch were tested to analyze perceptual domains. Experiments varied slightly for each patient, but often objects were presented to a patient in physical form or an image and the left and right hemispheres were tested. Behavioral responses were also documented throughout the experiment.

=== Patient WJ ===
Patient WJ was the first patient to undergo a full corpus callosotomy in 1962, after experiencing fifteen years of convulsions resulting from grand mal seizures. He was a World War II paratrooper who was injured at 30 years old during a bombing raid jump over the Netherlands, and again in a prison camp following his first injury. After returning home, he began to suffer from blackouts in which he would not remember what he was doing or where, and how or when he got there. At age 37, he suffered his first generalized convulsion. One of his worst episodes occurred in 1953, when he suffered a series of convulsions lasting for many days. During these convulsions, his left side would go numb and he would recover quickly, but after the series of convulsions, he never regained complete feeling on his left side.

Before his surgery, both hemispheres functioned and interacted normally, his sensory and motor functions were normal aside from slight hypoesthesia, and he could correctly identify and understand visual stimuli presented to both sides of his visual field. During his surgery in 1962, his surgeons determined that no massa intermedia had developed, and he had undergone atrophy in the part of the right frontal lobe exposed during the procedure. His operation was a success, in that it led to decreases in the frequency and intensity of his seizures.

=== Patient JW ===
Funnell et al. (2007) tested patient JW some time before June 2006. They described JW as

a right-handed male who was 47 years old at the time of testing. He successfully completed high school and has no reported learning disabilities. He had his first seizure at the age of 16 and the age of 25, he underwent a two-stage resection of the corpus callosum for relief of intractable epilepsy. Complete sectioning of the corpus callosum has been confirmed by MRI. Post-surgical MRI also revealed no evidence of other neurological damage.

Funnell et al.'s (2007) experiments were to determine each of JW's hemisphere's ability to perform simple addition, subtraction, multiplication and division. For example, in one experiment, on each trial, they presented an arithmetic problem in the center of the screen for one second, followed by a central crosshair JW was to look at. After one more second, Funnell et al. presented a number to one or the other hemisphere / visual field for 150 ms—too fast for JW to move his eyes. Randomly in half the trials, the number was the correct answer; in the other half of the trials it was the incorrect answer. With the hand on the same side as the number, JW pressed one key if the number was correct and another key if the number was incorrect.

Funnell et al.'s results were that performance of the left hemisphere was highly accurate (around 95%)—much better than performance of the right hemisphere, which was at chance for subtraction, multiplication, and division. Nevertheless the right hemisphere showed better-than-chance performance for addition (around 58%).

Turk et al. (2002) tested hemispheric differences in JW's recognition of himself and of familiar faces. They used faces that were composites of JW's face and Dr. Michael Gazzaniga's face. Composites ranged from 100% JW, through 50% JW and 50% Gazzaniga, to 100% Gazzaniga. JW pressed keys to say whether a presented face looked like him or Gazzaniga. Turk et al. concluded there are cortical networks in the left hemisphere that play an important role in self-recognition.

=== Patient VP ===
Patient VP is a woman who underwent a two-stage callosotomy in 1979 at the age of 27. Although the callosotomy was reported to be complete, a follow-up MRI in 1984 revealed spared fibers in the rostrum and splenium. The spared rostral fibers constituted approximately 1.8% of the total cross-sectional area of the corpus callosum and the spared splenial fibers constituted approximately 1% of the area. VP's postsurgery intelligence and memory quotients were within normal limits.

One of the experiments involving VP attempted to investigate systematically the types of visual information that could be transferred via VP's spared splenial fibers. The first experiment was designed to assess VP's ability to make between-field perceptual judgments about simultaneously presented pairs of stimuli. The stimuli were presented in varying positions with respect to the horizontal and vertical midline with VP's vision fixated on a central crosshair. The judgments were based on differences in color, shape or size. The testing procedure was the same for all three types of stimuli; after presentation of each pair, VP verbally responded "yes" if the two items in the pair were identical and "no" if they were not. The results show that there was no perceptual transfer for color, size or shape with binomial tests showing that VP's accuracy was not greater than chance.

A second experiment involving VP attempted to investigate what aspects of words transferred between the two hemispheres. The set up was similar to the previous experiment, with VP's vision fixated on a central crosshair. A word pair was presented with one word on each side of the crosshair for 150 ms. The words presented were in one of four categories: words that looked and sounded like rhymes (e.g. tire and fire), words that looked as if they should rhyme but did not (e.g. cough and dough), words that did not look as if they should rhyme but did (e.g. bake and ache), and words that neither looked nor sounded like rhymes (e.g. keys and fort). After presentation of each word pair, VP responded "yes" if the two words rhymed and "no" if they did not. VP's performance was above chance and she was able to distinguish among the different conditions. When the word pairs did not sound like rhymes, VP was able to say accurately that the words did not rhyme, regardless of whether or not they looked as if they should rhyme. When the words did rhyme, VP was more likely to say they rhymed, particularly if the words also looked as if they should rhyme.

Although VP showed no evidence for transfer of color, shape or size, there was evidence for transfer of word information. This is consistent with the speculation that the transfer of word information involves fibers in the ventroposterior region of the splenium—the same region in which VP had callosal sparing. VP is able to integrate words presented to both visual fields, creating a concept that is not suggested by either word. For example, she combines "head" and "stone" to form the integrated concept of a tombstone.

=== Kim Peek ===
Kim Peek was arguably the most well-known savant. He was born on November 11, 1951, with an enlarged head, sac-like protrusions of the brain and the membranes that cover it through openings in the skull, a malformed cerebellum, and without a corpus callosum, an anterior commissure, or a posterior commissure. He was able to memorize over 9,000 books, and information from approximately 15 subject areas. These include: world/American history, sports, movies, geography, actors and actresses, the Bible, church history, literature, classical music, area codes/zip codes of the United States, television stations serving these areas, and step-by-step directions within any major U.S. city. Despite these abilities, he had an IQ of 87, was diagnosed as autistic, was unable to button his shirt, and had difficulties performing everyday tasks. The missing structures of his brain have yet to be linked to his increased abilities, but they can be linked to his ability to read pages of a book in 8–10 seconds. He was able to view the left page of a book with his left visual field and the right page of a book with his right visual fields so he could read both pages simultaneously. He also had developed language areas in both hemispheres, something very uncommon in split-brain patients. Language is processed in areas of the left temporal lobe, and involves a contralateral transfer of information before the brain can process what is being read. In Peek's case, there was no transfer ability—this is what led to his development of language centers in each hemisphere.

Although Peek did not undergo corpus callosotomy, he is considered a natural split-brain patient and is critical to understanding the importance of the corpus callosum. Kim Peek died in 2009.

== See also ==
- Lateralization of brain function
- Left brain interpreter
- Confabulation
- Brain asymmetry
- Dual consciousness
- Divided consciousness
- Bicameral mentality
- Alien hand syndrome
- Society of Mind
- Parallel computing
- Laterality
- Mind–body problem
- Philosophy of mind
- Theory of mind
- Ideomotor phenomenon
- Cognitive Neuroscience
- Agenesis of the corpus callosum
- Of Two Minds (book)
