= Joseph Bogen =

American neurophysiologist (1926–2005)

Joseph E. Bogen (July 13, 1926 – April 22, 2005) was an American neurophysiologist who specialized in split brain research and focused on theories of consciousness. He was a clinical professor of neurosurgery at the University of Southern California, Adjunct Professor of Psychology at UCLA, and a visiting professor at Caltech.

== Early life and education ==
Joseph E. "Joe" Bogen was born on July 13, 1926, in Cincinnati, Ohio.

He was raised in Ohio, moved to Southern California at 16 and graduated from Monrovia High School, Monrovia, California in 1943. He began undergraduate studies at Caltech in 1943, but left to join the United States Navy in 1944. He was deployed to the South Pacific and was honorably discharged in 1946. He completed his undergraduate education at Whittier College and received a B.A. in economics in 1949. He enrolled in the University of Cincinnati and UCLA, followed by the USC School of Medicine.

Bogen received his M.D. from the University of Southern California in 1956. From 1956 to 1957 he completed an internship in Surgery at the New York Hospital Cornell, from 1957 to 1958, he completed his residency in surgery at that institution.

== Career ==
From 1958 to 1959, he was a Fellow in Medical Sciences at the National Research Council. From 1959 to 1963, he was a Resident in Neurosurgery, at White Memorial Hospital. In 1966, he received his board certification and was a Diplomate, American Board of Neurological Surgery.

=== Split brain research ===
Bogen was part of a research team at Caltech with Roger Sperry and H. G. Gordon which conducted the first split brain study. His early surgical interventions to control epilepsy laid the foundation for the development of modern ideas about the unique identities of the right and left brains. His work played a crucial role in the development of the split-brain experiments that won Caltech's Roger Sperry the 1981 Nobel Prize in physiology.

=== Theories of consciousness ===
Bogen argued that consciousness is subjectivity, that looking for consciousness is like looking for the wind, you can only see its effects. Bogen suggested that scientists look for a center (a nucleus) that has distributivity (i.e. widespread inward and outward connectivity) as a site that produces subjectivity as consciousness.

At the time of his death, Bogen had been researching the site in the brain where consciousness is located and was preparing a book about his findings.

Bogen lent his expertise in Wernicke's area to American psychologist Julian Jaynes (1920–97), assisting Jaynes in the development of the bicameral mentality hypothesis in 1976.

Dr. Bogen died on April 22, 2005, in Pasadena, California, after a long illness.

== Publications ==
Lists of books and journal articles:

- 1954-1987
- 1988-2005

== See also ==
- The Origin of Consciousness in the Breakdown of the Bicameral Mind
