= Brain asymmetry =

Term in human neuroanatomy referring to several things

In human neuroanatomy, brain asymmetry can refer to at least two quite distinct findings:

- Neuroanatomical differences between the left and right sides of the brain
- Lateralized functional differences: lateralization of brain function

A stereotypical image of brain lateralisation - demonstrated to be false in neuroscientific research.

Neuroanatomical differences themselves exist on different scales, from neuronal densities, to the size of regions such as the planum temporale, to—at the largest scale—the torsion or "wind" in the human brain, reflected shape of the skull, which reflects a backward (posterior) protrusion of the left occipital bone and a forward (anterior) protrusion of the right frontal bone. In addition to gross size differences, both neurochemical and structural differences have been found between the hemispheres. Asymmetries appear in the spacing of cortical columns, as well as dendritic structure and complexity. Larger cell sizes are also found in layer III of Broca's area.

The human brain has an overall leftward posterior and rightward anterior asymmetry (or brain torque). There are particularly large asymmetries in the frontal, temporal and occipital lobes, which increase in asymmetry in the antero-posterior direction beginning at the central region. Leftward asymmetry can be seen in the Heschl gyrus, parietal operculum, Silvian fissure, left cingulate gyrus, temporo-parietal region and planum temporale. Rightward asymmetry can be seen in the right central sulcus (potentially suggesting increased connectivity between motor and somatosensory cortices in the left side of the brain), lateral ventricle, entorhinal cortex, amygdala and temporo-parieto-occipital area. Sex-dependent brain asymmetries are also common. For example, human male brains are more asymmetrically lateralized than those of females. However, gene expression studies done by Hawrylycz and colleagues and Pletikos and colleagues, were not able to detect asymmetry between the hemispheres on the population level.

People with autism have much more symmetrical brains than people without it.

== History ==
In the mid-19th century scientists first began to make discoveries regarding lateralization of the brain, or differences in anatomy and corresponding function between the brain's two hemispheres. Franz Gall, a German anatomist, was the first to describe what is now known as the Doctrine of Cerebral Localization. Gall believed that, rather than the brain operating as a single, whole entity, different mental functions could be attributed to different parts of the brain. He was also the first to suggest language processing happened in the frontal lobes. However, Gall's theories were controversial among many scientists at the time. Others were convinced by experiments such as those conducted by Marie-Jean-Pierre Flourens, in which he demonstrated lesions to bird brains caused irreparable damage to vital functions. Flourens's methods, however, were not precise; the crude methodology employed in his experiments actually caused damage to several areas of the tiny brains of the avian models.

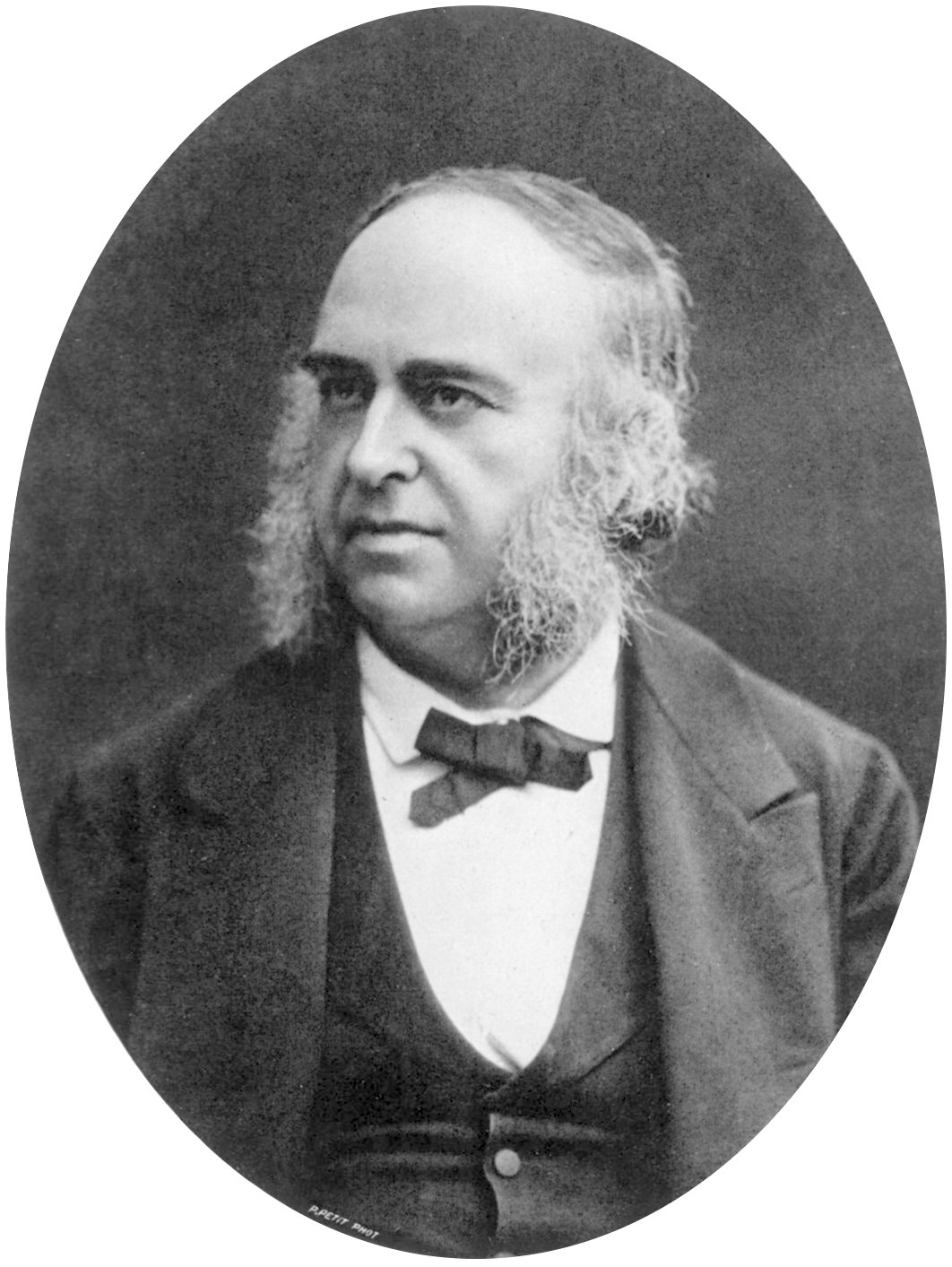
Paul Broca was among the first to offer compelling evidence for localization of function when he identified an area of the brain related to speech.

In 1861, surgeon Paul Broca provided evidence that supported Gall's theories. Broca discovered that two of his patients who had had speech loss had similar lesions in the same area of the left frontal lobe. While this was compelling evidence for localization of function, the connection to "sidedness" was not made immediately. As Broca continued to study similar patients, he made the connection that all of the cases involved damage to the left hemisphere, and in 1864 noted the significance of these findings—that this must be a specialized region. He also—incorrectly—proposed theories about the relationship of speech areas to "handedness".

Accordingly, some of the most famous early studies on brain asymmetry involved speech processing. Asymmetry in the Sylvian fissure (also known as the lateral sulcus), which separates the frontal and parietal lobes from the temporal lobe, was one of the first incongruencies to be discovered. Its anatomical variances are related to the size and location of two areas of the human brain that are important for language processing, Broca's area and Wernicke's area, both in the left hemisphere.

Around the same time that Broca and Wernicke made their discoveries, neurologist Hughlings Jackson suggested the idea of a "leading hemisphere"—or, one side of the brain that played a more significant role in overall function—which would eventually pave the way for understanding hemispheric "dominance" for various processes. Several years later, in the mid-20th century, critical understanding of hemispheric lateralization for visuospatial, attention and perception, auditory, linguistic and emotional processing came from patients who underwent split-brain procedures to treat disorders such as epilepsy. In split-brain patients, the corpus callosum is cut, severing the main structure for communication between the two hemispheres. The first modern split-brain patient was a war veteran known as Patient W.J., whose case contributed to further understanding of asymmetry.

This work led to Roger W. Sperry receiving the 1981 Nobel Prize in Physiology or Medicine, but also generated exaggerated or poorly supported speculation about the complementary functions of the cerebral hemispheres.

Brain asymmetry is not unique to humans. In addition to studies on human patients with various diseases of the brain, much of what is understood today about asymmetries and lateralization of function has been learned through both invertebrate and vertebrate animal models, including zebrafish, pigeons, rats, and many others. For example, more recent studies revealing sexual dimorphism in brain asymmetries in the cerebral cortex and hypothalamus of rats show that sex differences emerging from hormonal signaling can be an important influence on brain structure and function. Work with zebrafish has been especially informative because this species provides the best model for directly linking asymmetric gene expression with asymmetric morphology, and for behavioral analyses.

== In humans ==
=== Lateralized functional differences ===
The left and right hemispheres operate the contralateral sides of the body. Each hemisphere contains sections of all 4 lobes: the frontal lobe, parietal lobe, temporal lobe, and occipital lobe. The two hemispheres are separated along the mediated longitudinal fissure and are connected by the corpus callosum which allows for communication and coordination of stimuli and information. The corpus callosum is the largest collective pathway of white matter tissue in the body that is made of more than 200 million nerve fibers. The left and right hemispheres are associated with different functions and specialize in interpreting the same data in different ways, referred to as lateralization of the brain. The left hemisphere is associated with language and calculations, while the right hemisphere is more closely associated with visual-spatial recognition and facial recognition. This lateralization of brain function results in some specialized regions being only present in a certain hemisphere or being dominant in one hemisphere versus the other. Some of the significant regions included in each hemisphere are listed below.

==== Left hemisphere ====
Broca's Area
Broca's area is located in the left hemisphere prefrontal cortex above the cingulate gyrus in the third frontal convolution. Broca's area was discovered by Paul Broca in 1865. This area handles speech production. Damage to this area would result in Broca aphasia which causes the patient to become unable to formulate coherent appropriate sentences.
Wernicke's Area
Wernicke's area was discovered in 1874 by Carl Wernicke and was found to be the site of language comprehension. Wernicke's area is also found in the left hemisphere in the temporal lobe. Damage to this area of the brain results in the individual losing the ability to understand language. However, they are still able to produce sounds, words, and sentence although they are not used in the appropriate context.

==== Right hemisphere ====
Fusiform Face Area
The Fusiform face area (FFA) is an area that has been studied to be highly active when faces are being attended to in the visual field. A FFA is found to be present in both hemispheres, however, studies have found that the FFA is predominantly lateralized in the right hemisphere where a more in-depth cognitive processing of faces is conducted. The left hemisphere FFA is associated with rapid processing of faces and their features.

=== Other regions and associated diseases ===
Some significant regions that can present as asymmetrical in the brain can result in either of the hemispheres due to factors such as genetics. An example would include handedness. Handedness can result from asymmetry in the motor cortex of one hemisphere. For right handed individuals, since the brain operates the contralateral side of the body, they could have a more induced motor cortex in the left hemisphere.

Several diseases have been found to exacerbate brain asymmetries that are already present in the brain. Researchers are starting to look into the effect and relationship of brain asymmetries to diseases such as schizophrenia and dyslexia.

Schizophrenia
Schizophrenia is a complex long-term mental disorder that causes hallucinations, delusions and a lack of concentration, thinking, and motivation in an individual. Studies have found that individuals with schizophrenia have a lack in brain asymmetry thus reducing the functional efficiency of affected regions such as the frontal lobe. Conditions include leftward functional hemispheric lateralization, loss of laterality for language comprehension, a reduction in gyrification, brain torsion etc.
Dyslexia
As studied earlier, language is usually dominant in the left hemisphere. Developmental language disorders, such as dyslexia, have been researched using brain imaging techniques to understand the neuronal or structural changes associated with the disorder. Past research has exhibited that hemispheric asymmetries that are usually found in healthy adults such as the size of the temporal lobe is not present in adult patients with dyslexia. In conjunction, past research has exhibited that patients with dyslexia lack a lateralization of language in their brain compared to healthy patients. Instead patients with dyslexia showed to have a bilateral hemispheric dominance for language.

== Current research ==
Lateralization of function and asymmetry in the human brain continues to propel a popular branch of neuroscientific and psychological inquiry. Technological advancements for brain mapping have enabled researchers to see more parts of the brain more clearly, which has illuminated previously undetected lateralization differences that occur during different life stages. As more information emerges, researchers are finding insights into how and why early human brains may have evolved the way that they did to adapt to social, environmental and pathological changes. This information provides clues regarding plasticity, or how different parts of the brain can sometimes be recruited for different functions.

Continued study of brain asymmetry also contributes to the understanding and treatment of complex diseases. Neuroimaging in patients with Alzheimer's disease, for example, shows significant deterioration in the left hemisphere, along with a rightward hemispheric dominance—which could relate to recruitment of resources to that side of the brain in the face of damage to the left. These hemispheric changes have been connected to performance on memory tasks.

As has been the case in the past, studies on language processing and the implications of left- and right- handedness also dominate current research on brain asymmetry.

== See also ==
- Alien hand syndrome
- Laterality
- Lateralization of brain function
- Michael Gazzaniga
- Roger Wolcott Sperry
- Split-brain
