= Society of Mind =

Book by Marvin Minsky

The Society of Mind
- Author: Marvin Minsky
- Publisher: Simon & Schuster
- Publication date: 1986
- ISBN: 0-671-60740-5

The Society of Mind is both the title of a 1986 book and the name of a theory of natural intelligence as written and developed by Marvin Minsky.

In his book of the same name, Minsky constructs a model of human intelligence step by step, built up from the interactions of simple parts called agents, which are themselves mindless. He describes the postulated interactions as constituting a "society of mind", hence the title.

== The book ==
The work, which first appeared in 1986, was the first comprehensive description of Minsky's "society of mind" theory, which he began developing in the early 1970s. It is composed of 270 self-contained essays which are divided into 30 general chapters. The book was also made into a CD-ROM version.

In the process of explaining the society of mind, Minsky introduces a wide range of ideas and concepts. He develops theories about how processes such as language, memory, and learning work, and also covers concepts such as consciousness, the sense of self, and free will; because of this, many view The Society of Mind as a work of philosophy.

The book was not written to prove anything specific about AI or cognitive science, and does not reference physical brain structures. Instead, it is a collection of ideas about how the mind and thinking work on the conceptual level.

== The theory ==
Minsky first started developing the theory with Seymour Papert in the early 1970s. Minsky said that the biggest source of ideas about the theory came from his work in trying to create a machine that uses a robotic arm, a video camera, and a computer to build with children's blocks.

== Nature of mind ==
A core tenet of Minsky's philosophy is that "minds are what brains do". The society of mind theory views the human mind – and any other naturally evolved cognitive system – as a vast society of individually simple processes known as agents. These processes are the fundamental thinking entities from which minds are built, and together produce the many abilities we attribute to minds. The great power in viewing a mind as a society of agents, as opposed to the consequence of some basic principle or some simple formal system, is that different agents can be based on different types of processes with different purposes, ways of representing knowledge, and methods for producing results.

This idea is perhaps best summarized by the following quote:

What magical trick makes us intelligent? The trick is that there is no trick. The power of intelligence stems from our vast diversity, not from any single, perfect principle. —Marvin Minsky, The Society of Mind, p. 308

== See also ==
- Cognitive psychology
- Cognitive science
- Consciousness Explained
- Distributed cognition
- Divided consciousness
- DUAL (cognitive architecture)
- Dual consciousness
- Lateralization of brain function
- Left-brain interpreter
- Parallel computing
- Philosophy of mind
- Self-awareness
- Situated cognition
- The Emotion Machine
- Theory of mind
