= Anterior commissure =

Bundle of nerve fibers connecting the two temporal lobes of the brain

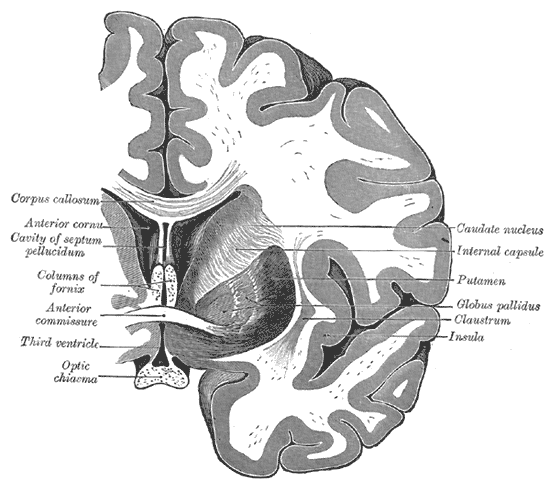
- Coronal cross-section of brain showing the anterior commissure. (left, third from bottom.)

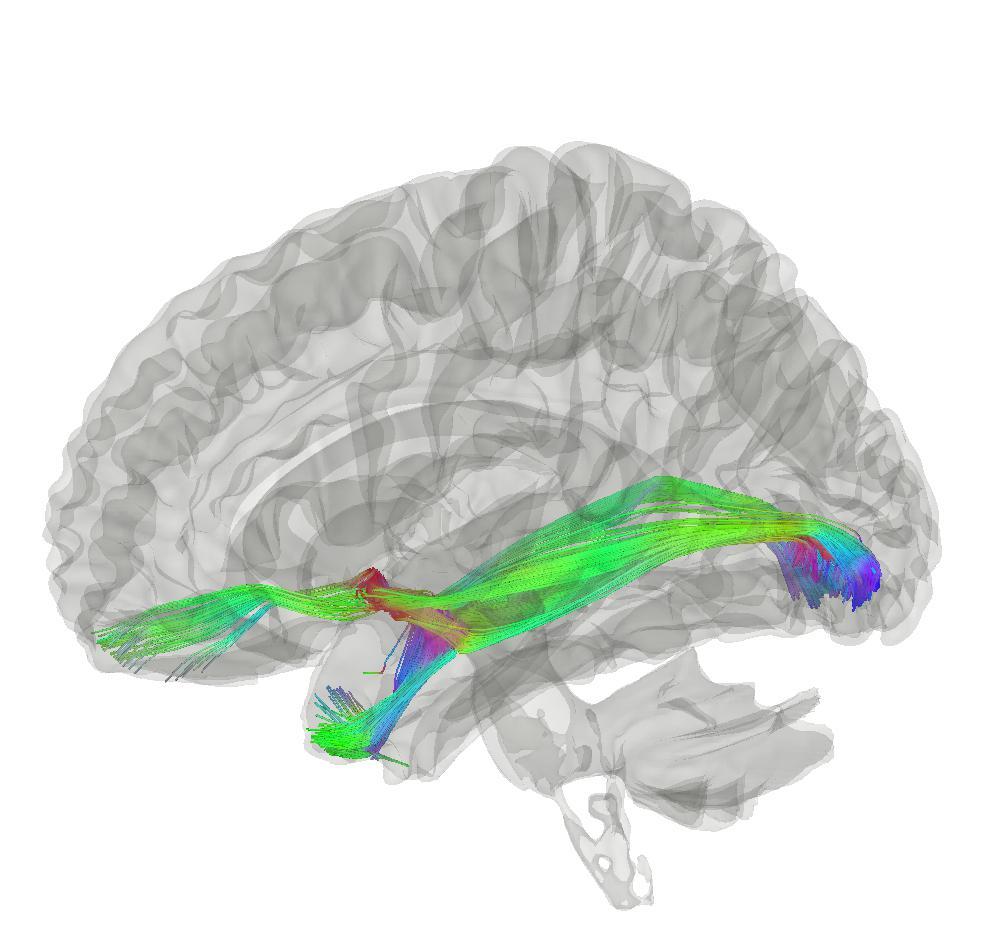
- Tractography of anterior commissure

Details

Identifiers
- Latin: commissura anterior
- MeSH: D066240
- NeuroNames: 205, 390
- NeuroLex ID: birnlex_1557
- TA98: A14.1.08.421
- TA2: 5613
- FMA: 61961

The anterior commissure (also known as the precommissure) is a white matter tract (a bundle of axons) connecting the two temporal lobes of the cerebral hemispheres across the midline, and placed in front of the columns of the fornix. In most existing mammals, the great majority of fibers connecting the two hemispheres travel through the corpus callosum, which is over 10 times larger than the anterior commissure, and other routes of communication pass through the hippocampal commissure or, indirectly, via subcortical connections. Nevertheless, the anterior commissure is a significant pathway that can be clearly distinguished in the brains of all mammals.

The anterior commissure plays a key role in pain sensation, more specifically sharp, acute pain. It also contains decussating fibers from the olfactory tracts, vital for the sense of smell and chemoreception. The anterior commissure works with the posterior commissure to link the two cerebral hemispheres of the brain and also interconnects the amygdalae and temporal lobes, contributing to the role of memory, emotion, speech and hearing. It also is involved in olfaction, instinct, and sexual behavior.

In a sagittal section, the anterior commissure is oval in shape, having a long vertical axis that measures about 5 mm.

== Structure ==
It interconnects multiple cortical regions of the temporal lobes, the amygdalae, and olfactory bulbs. It is a part of the neospinothalamic tract for pain.

== Function ==
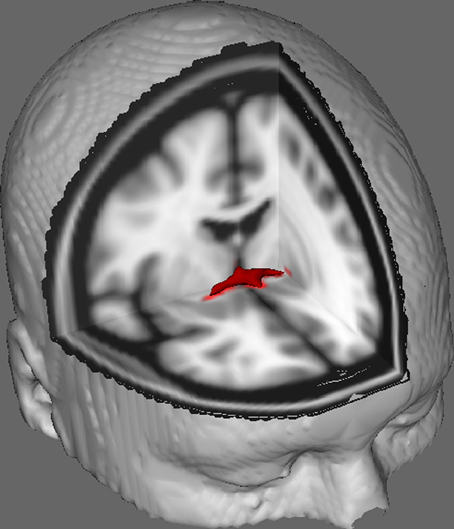
Averaged tracking results of ten normal controls showing the anterior commissure. Image from Winter and Franz (2014)

The functionality of the anterior commissure is still not completely understood. Researchers have implicated it in functions ranging from colour perception to attention. One such study supported colour perception in callosal agenesis (those born without a corpus callosum; Barr & Corballis, 2002). Other studies have built on this to imply that the anterior commissure can be a compensatory pathway in those without a corpus callosum, presenting diffusion tensor imaging (DTI) techniques to better elucidate the anterior commissure and how it might be implicated in various functions (Winter & Franz, 2014).

=== Sexuality ===
In 1992, Laura Allen and Roger Gorski of UCLA measured the anterior commissures of 30 homosexual men, 30 heterosexual men, and 30 heterosexual women. They found that all three groups' commissures were significantly different from one another, with homosexual males having the largest anterior commissure, followed by heterosexual women, and then heterosexual men, who had the smallest anterior commissures.

In 1993, a review by Byne and Parsons criticized this research, noting that 27 of the 33 homosexual males fell within the range of heterosexual males in the study.

A later report by Byne et al. (2001) noted that

We also measured the anterior commissure in the same blocks of tissue used for the present hypothalamic study (data not shown) and were unable to replicate a report (by Allen and Gorski) that its cross-sectional area is larger in women than in men.

Also, a study by Lasco et al. (2002) said:

We examined the cross-sectional area of the AC in postmortem material from 120 individuals, and found no variation in the size of the AC with age, HIV status, sex, or sexual orientation.

== Other animals ==
The corpus callosum allows for communication between the two hemispheres and is found only in placental mammals (the eutherians), while it is absent in monotremes and marsupials, as well as other vertebrates such as birds, reptiles, amphibians and fish. The anterior commissure serves as the primary mode of interhemispheric communication in marsupials, and which carries all the commissural fibers arising from the neocortex (also known as the neopallium), whereas in placental mammals the anterior commissure carries only some of these fibers).

== Gallery ==
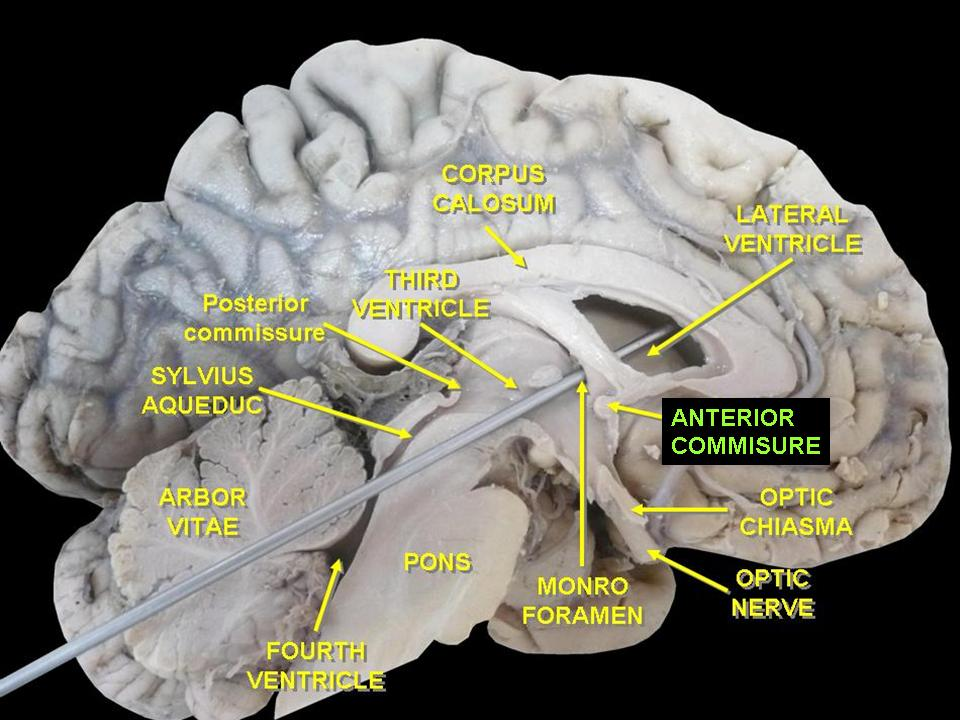
Anterior commissure

== See also ==
- Posterior commissure
- Corpus callosum
