= Roger Wolcott Sperry =

American neuropsychologist, neurobiologist and Nobel laureate

Roger Sperry
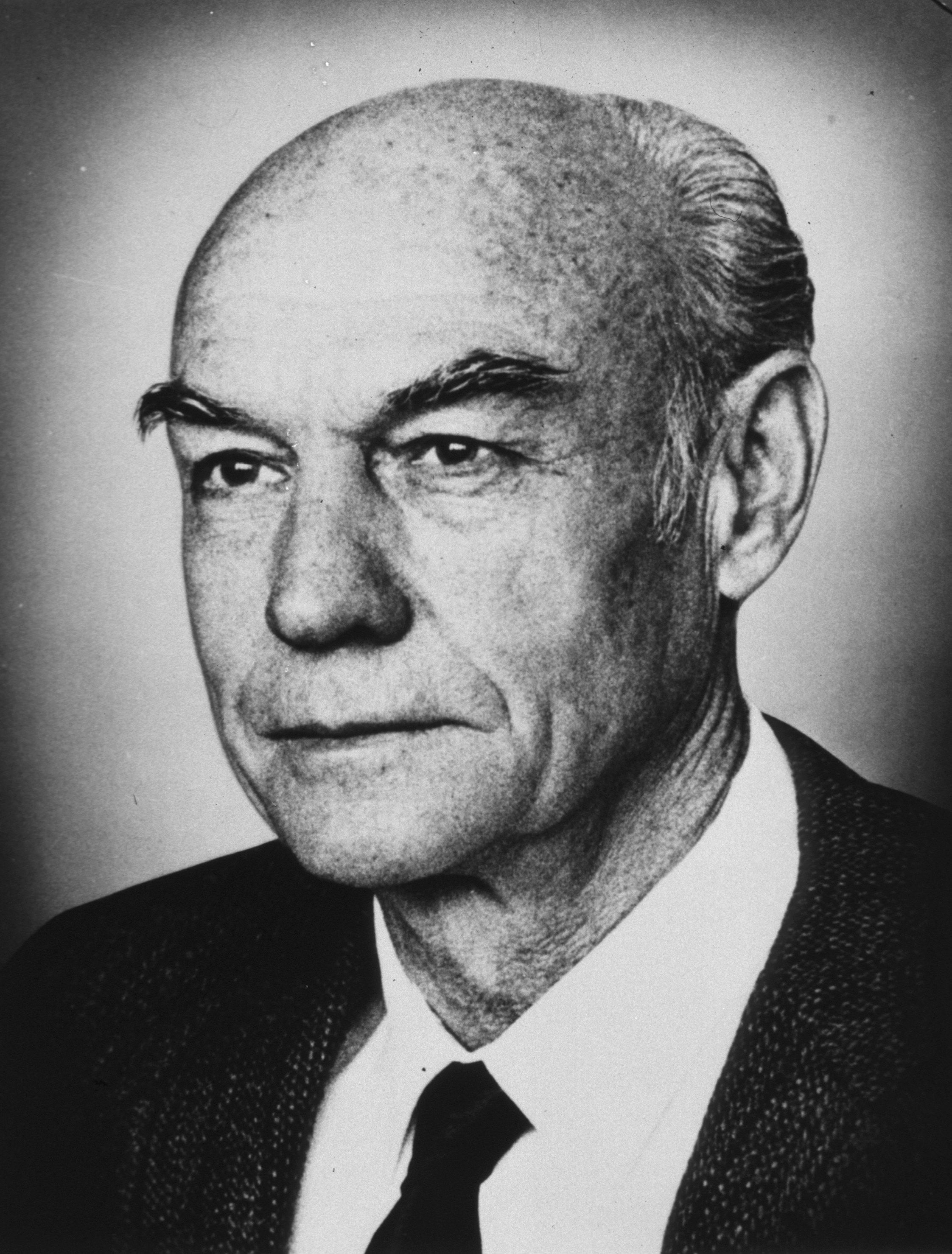
- Born: Roger Wolcott Sperry; August 20, 1913; Hartford, Connecticut, U.S.
- Died: April 17, 1994 (aged 80); Pasadena, California, U.S.
- Education: Oberlin College (BA, MA); University of Chicago (PhD)
- Known for: Split-brain research; Chemoaffinity hypothesis
- Awards: Nobel Prize in Physiology or Medicine (1981)
- Scientific career
- Fields: Neuropsychology
- Thesis: Functional results of crossing nerves and transposing muscles in the fore and hind limbs of the rat (1941)
- Doctoral advisor: Paul A. Weiss
- Website: rogersperry.org

Roger Wolcott Sperry (August 20, 1913 – April 17, 1994) was an American neuropsychologist, neurobiologist, cognitive neuroscientist, who, together with David H. Hubel and Torsten Nils Wiesel, won the 1981 Nobel Prize in Medicine for his work with split-brain research. A Review of General Psychology survey, published in 2002, ranked Sperry as the 44th most cited psychologist of the 20th century.

== Early life and education ==
Sperry was born in Hartford, Connecticut, to Francis Bushnell and Florence Kraemer Sperry. His father was in banking, and his mother trained in business school. He was raised in an upper middle-class environment, which stressed academic achievement. Roger had one brother, Russell Loomis. Their father died when Roger was 11. Afterwards, his mother became assistant to the principal in the local high school.

Sperry went to Hall High School in West Hartford, Connecticut, where he was a star athlete in several sports, and did well enough academically to win a scholarship to Oberlin College. At Oberlin, he was captain of the basketball team, and he also took part in varsity baseball, football, and track. He also worked at a café on campus to help support himself. Sperry was an English major, but he took an Intro to Psychology class taught by a Professor named R. H. Stetson, who had worked with William James, the father of American Psychology. This class sparked Sperry's interest in the brain and how it can change. Stetson was disabled and had trouble getting around so Sperry would help him out by driving him to and from wherever he needed to go. This included taking Stetson to lunch with his colleagues. Sperry would just sit at the end of the table and listen to Stetson and his colleagues discuss their research and other psychological interests. This increased Sperry's interest in Psychology even more and after he received his undergraduate degree in English from Oberlin he decided to stay and get his master's degree in Psychology. He received his bachelor's degree in English in 1935 and a master's degree in psychology in 1937. He received his Ph.D. in zoology from the University of Chicago in 1941, supervised by Paul A. Weiss. Sperry then did postdoctoral research with Karl Lashley at Harvard University though most of his time was spent with Lashley at the Yerkes Primate Research Center in Orange Park, Florida.

== Career ==
In 1942, Sperry began work at the Yerkes Laboratories of Primate Biology, then a part of Harvard University. There he focused on experiments involving the rearranging of motor and sensory nerves. He left in 1946 to become an assistant professor, and later associate professor, at the University of Chicago. In 1949, during a routine chest x-ray, there was evidence of tuberculosis. He was sent to Saranac Lake in the Adironack Mountains in New York for treatment. It was during this time that he began writing his concepts of the mind and brain, which were first published in the American Scientist in 1952. In 1952, he became the Section Chief of Neurological Diseases and Blindness at the National Institutes of Health and finished out the year at the Marine Biology Laboratory in Coral Gables, Florida. Sperry went back to The University of Chicago in 1952 and became an Associate Professor of Psychology. He was not offered tenure at Chicago and planned to move to Bethesda, Maryland but was held up by a delay in construction at the National Institutes of Health. During this time Sperry's friend Victor Hepburn invited him to lecture about his research at a symposium. There were professors from the California Institute of Technology in the audience of the symposium who, after listening to Sperry's lecture, were so impressed with him that they offered him a job as the Hixson Professor of Psychobiology. In 1954, he accepted the position of professor at the California Institute of Technology (Caltech as Hixson Professor of Psychobiology) where he performed his most famous experiments with Joseph Bogen, MD and many students including Michael Gazzaniga.

Under the supervision of Paul Weiss while earning his Ph.D. at the University of Chicago, Sperry became interested in neuronal specificity and brain circuitry and began questioning the existing concepts about these two topics. He began a series of experiments in an attempt to answer this question. Sperry crosswired the motor nerves of rats' legs so the left nerve controlled the right leg and vice versa. He would then place the rats in a cage that had an electric grid on the bottom separated into four sections. Each leg of the rat was placed into one of the four sections of the electric grid. A shock was administered to a specific section of the grid, for example the grid where the rat's left back leg was located would receive a shock. Every time the left paw was shocked the rat would lift his right paw and vice versa. Sperry wanted to know how long it would take the rat to realize he was lifting the wrong paw. After repeated tests Sperry found that the rats never learned to lift up the correct paw, leading him to the conclusion that some things are just hardwired and cannot be relearned. In Sperry's words, "no adaptive functioning of the nervous system took place." During Sperry's postdoctoral years with Karl Lashley at Harvard and at the Yerkes Laboratories of Primate Biology in Orange Park, Florida, he continued his work on neuronal specificity that he had begun as a doctoral student and initiated a new series of studies involving salamanders. The optic nerves were sectioned and the eyes rotated 180 degrees. The question was whether vision would be normal after regeneration or would the animal forever view the world as "upside down" and right-left reversed. Should the latter prove to be the case, it would mean that the nerves were somehow "guided" back to their original sites of termination. Restoration of normal vision (i.e., "seeing" the world in a "right-side-up" orientation) would mean that the regenerating nerves had terminated in new sites, quite different from the original ones. The animals reacted as though the world was upside down and reversed from right to left. Furthermore, no amount of training could change the response. These studies, which provided strong evidence for nerve guidance by "intricate chemical codes under genetic control" (1963) culminated in Sperry's chemoaffinity hypothesis (1951).

Sperry later served on the Board of Trustees and as Professor of Psychobiology Emeritus at California Institute of Technology. The Sperry Neuroscience Building at Oberlin College was named in his honor in 1990.

He was a member of the American Association for Anatomy.

== Nobel Prize ==
Sperry was granted numerous awards over his lifetime, including the California Scientist of the Year Award in 1972, the National Medal of Science in 1989, the Wolf Prize in Medicine in 1979, and the Albert Lasker Medical Research Award in 1979, and the Nobel Prize for Medicine/Physiology in 1981 that he shared with David H. Hubel and Torsten N. Wiesel. Sperry won this award for his work with "split-brain" patients. The brain is divided into two hemispheres, the left and right hemispheres, connected in the middle by a part of the brain called the corpus callosum. In "split-brain" patients, the corpus callosum has been severed due to the patients suffering from epilepsy, a disease that causes intense and persistent seizures. Seizures begin in one hemisphere and continue into the other hemisphere. Cutting the corpus callosum prevents the seizures from moving from one hemisphere to the other, which then prevents seizures from occurring, thus allowing the patients to function normally instead of suffering from continuous seizures.

Sperry first became interested in "split-brain" research when he was working on the topic of interocular transfer, which occurs when "one learns with one eye how to solve a problem then, with that eye covered and using the other eye, one already knows how to solve the problem". Sperry asked the question: "how can the learning with one eye appear with the use of the other?". Sperry cut nerves in the eyes of cats so the left eye was connected to the left hemisphere and the right eye was connected to the right hemisphere; he also cut the corpus callosum. The cats were then taught to distinguish a triangle from a square with the right eye covered. Then the cats were presented the same problem with the left eye covered; the cats had no idea what they had just learned with the right eye and because of this could be taught to distinguish a square from a triangle. Depending on which eye was covered, the cats would either distinguish a square from a triangle or a triangle from a square, demonstrating that the left and right hemispheres learned and remembered two different events. This led Sperry to believe that the left and right hemispheres function separately when not connected by the corpus callosum.

Sperry's research with "split-brain" cats helped lead to the discovery that cutting the corpus callosum is a very effective treatment for patients with epilepsy. Initially after the patients recovered from surgery there were no signs that the surgery caused any changes to their behavior or functioning. This observation rendered the question: if the surgery had absolutely no effect on any part of the patients' normal functioning then what is the purpose of the corpus callosum? Was it simply there to keep the two sides of the brain from collapsing, as Karl Lashley jokingly put it? Sperry was asked to develop a series of tests to perform on the "split-brain" patients to determine if the surgery caused changes in the patients' functioning or not.

Working with his graduate student Michael Gazzaniga, Sperry invited several of the "split-brain" patients to volunteer to take part in his study to determine if the surgery affected their functioning. These tests were designed to test the patients' language, vision, and motor skills. When a person views something in the left visual field (that is on the left side of their body), the information travels to the right hemisphere of the brain and vice versa. In the first series of tests, Sperry would present a word to either the left or right visual field for a short period of time. If the word was shown to the right visual field, meaning the left hemisphere would process it, then the patient could report seeing the word. If the word was shown to the left visual field, meaning the right hemisphere would process it, then the patient could not report seeing the word. This led Sperry to believe that only the left side of the brain could articulate speech. However, in a follow-up experiment, Sperry discovered that the right hemisphere does have some language abilities. In this experiment, he had the patients place their left hands in a tray full of objects located under a partition so the patient would not be able to see the objects. Then a word was shown to the patient's left visual field, which was processed by the right side of the brain. This word described one of the objects in the tray, so the patient's left hand picked up the object corresponding to the word. When participants were asked about the word and the object in their hand, they claimed they had not seen the word and had no idea why they were holding the object. The right side of the brain had recognized the word and told the left hand to pick it up, but because the right side of the brain cannot speak and the left side of the brain had not seen the word, the patient could not articulate what they had seen.

In another series of experiments further examining the lateralization of language in the left and right hemispheres, Sperry presented one object to the left visual field and a different object to the right visual field of the "split-brain" patients. The patient's left hand was put under a partition and then the patient was asked to draw with their left hand what they had been shown. The patients would draw what they had seen in their left visual field, but when asked what they had drawn would describe what had been shown to their right visual field. These tests proved that when the corpus callosum is severed, it breaks the connection between the left and right hemispheres, making them unable to communicate with each other. Not only are they unable to communicate with each other, but also without the corpus callosum connecting them one hemisphere has no idea that the other hemisphere even exists. There was even evidence of this outside the laboratory when some of the patients reported that, "while their left hand was unbuttoning their shirt, the right hand would follow along behind and button it again." These experiments were beneficial to numerous people in many different ways.

In his words, each hemisphere is:

indeed a conscious system in its own right, perceiving, thinking, remembering, reasoning, willing, and emoting, all at a characteristically human level, and ... both the left and the right hemisphere may be conscious simultaneously in different, even in mutually conflicting, mental experiences that run along in parallel

— Roger Wolcott Sperry, 1974

This research contributed greatly to understanding the lateralization of brain function. In 1989, Sperry also received the National Medal of Science. Afterwards in 1993, Sperry received the Lifetime Achievement Award from APA.

In addition to his contribution in establishing the lateralized function of the brain, Sperry is noted for his "chemoaffinity hypothesis", which has not only been influential in formation of testable hypotheses in how precise neuronal wiring diagram is established in the brain, but the hypothesis itself has been verified by numerous experiments.

The cells and fibers of the brain must carry some kind of individual identification tags, presumably cytochemical in nature, by which they are distinguished one from another almost, in many regions, to the level of the single neurons

— Roger Wolcott Sperry

In the words of a 2009 review article in Science magazine: "He suggested that gradients of such identification tags on retinal neurons and on the target cells in the brain coordinately guide the orderly projection of millions of developing retinal axons. This idea was supported by the identification and genetic analysis of axon guidance molecules, including those that direct development of the vertebrate visual system." This was confirmed in the seventies by Marshall W. Nirenberg's work on chick retinas and later on Drosophila melanogaster larvae.

The experiments conducted by Sperry focused on four major ideas which were also called "turnarounds": equipotentiality, split brain studies, nerve regeneration and plasticity, and psychology of the consciousness.

== Personal life ==
In 1949, Sperry married Norma Gay Deupree. They had one son, Glenn Michael, and one daughter, Janeth Hope. Sperry was a quiet, thoughtful, and modest man with an insatiable curiosity. He never stopped working, questioning, or learning up until his death in 1994 of amyotrophic lateral sclerosis (ALS). Sperry could often be found in his office with his feet propped up on his desk, scribbling in his notebook or deep in thought. Sperry was an avid paleontologist and displayed his large fossil collection in his home. He was also a very talented sculptor, artist, and ceramicist. He enjoyed going on camping and fishing trips with his wife and children to Baja California.

== Awards and honors ==
- 1931–1935 Amos C. Miller Scholarship, Oberlin College
- 1941–1942 National Research Council Fellowship
- 1954 Distinguished Alumni Citation, Oberlin College
- 1960 Elected National Academy of Sciences
- 1963 Elected American Academy of Arts and Sciences
- 1969 Howard Crosby Warren Medal, Society of Experimental Psychologists
- 1971 Distinguished Scientific Contribution Award, American Psychological Association
- 1972 Co-recipient, William Thomson Wakeman Research Award, National Paraplegia Foundation
- 1972 California Scientist of the Year Award
- 1972 Honorary Doctor of Science Degree, University of Cambridge
- 1973 Passano Award in Medical Science
- 1974 Elected Honorary Member American Neurological Association
- 1974 Elected American Philosophical Society
- 1975 Co-recipient Claude Bernard Science Journalism Award
- 1976 Karl Spencer Lashley Award of American Philosophical Society
- 1976 Elected Foreign Member of Royal Society (ForMemRS)
- 1976 Honorary Doctor of Science Degree, University of Chicago
- 1978 Elected Member Pontifical Academy of Sciences
- 1979 Honorary Doctor of Science, Kenyon College
- 1979 Wolf Prize in Medicine
- 1979 Ralph W. Gerard Prize in Neuroscience of the Society for Neuroscience
- 1979 International Visual Literacy Association Special Award for 1979
- 1979 Albert Lasker Medical Research Award
- 1980 Honorary Doctor of Science Degree, Rockefeller University
- 1980 Golden Plate Award of the American Academy of Achievement
- 1981 Shared the Nobel Prize in Medicine
- 1981 Founding member of the World Cultural Council.
- 1982 Honorary Doctor of Science Degree, Oberlin College
- 1982 California State Psychological Association Award for Distinguished Scientific Achievements in Psychology
- 1986 Realia Award of the Institute for Advanced Philosophic Research
- 1987 Mentor Society Award
- 1988 Elected Foreign Member USSR Academy of Sciences
- 1989 National Medal of Science
- 1989 Elected William James Fellow, American Psychological Society
- 1993 Lifetime Achievement Award, American Psychological Association

== Bibliography ==
- Sperry, R. W. (1945). "The problem of central nervous reorganization after nerve regeneration and muscle transposition". The Quarterly Review of Biology. 20 (4): 311–369. doi:10.1086/394990. PMID 21010869. S2CID 39594330.
- Sperry, R. W. (1951). "Regulative factors in the orderly growth of neural circuits". Growth (Suppl 10): 63–87. PMID 13151458.
- Sperry, R. W. (1961). "Cerebral Organization and Behavior: The split brain behaves in many respects like two separate brains, providing new research possibilities". Science. 133 (3466): 1749–1757. doi:10.1126/science.133.3466.1749. PMID 17829720.
- Sperry, R. W. (1963). "Chemoaffinity in the Orderly Growth of Nerve Fiber Patterns and Connections". Proceedings of the National Academy of Sciences of the United States of America. 50 (4): 703–710. Bibcode:1963PNAS...50..703S. doi:10.1073/pnas.50.4.703. PMC 221249. PMID 14077501.
- "Interhemispheric relationships: the neocortical commissures; syndromes of hemisphere disconnection." (with M.S. Gazzaniga, and J.E. Bogen) In: P. J. Vinken and G.W. Bruyn (Eds.), Handbook Clin. Neurol (Amsterdam: North-Holland Publishing Co.) 4: 273–290 (1969)
- "Lateral specialization in the surgically separated hemispheres." In: F. Schmitt and F. Worden (Eds.), Third Neurosciences Study Program (Cambridge: MIT Press) 3: 5–19 (1974)
- Sperry, R. W. (1980). "Mind-brain interaction: Mentalism, yes; dualism, no". Neuroscience. 5 (2): 195–206. doi:10.1016/0306-4522(80)90098-6. PMID 7374938. S2CID 38872616.
- "Science and moral priority: merging mind, brain and human values." Convergence, Vol. 4 (Ser. ed. Ruth Anshen) New York: Columbia University Press (1982)
- Hamilton, C. R. (1998). "Paths in the brain, actions of the mind: Special issue in honor of Roger W. Sperry". Neuropsychologia. 36 (10): 953–954. PMID 9845044.
- Girstenbrey, W. (1981). "The different faces of the hemispheres. The presentation of the Nobel Prize for Medicine and Physiology 1981 to the neurobiologists Sperry, Hubel and Wiesel". Fortschritte der Medizin. 99 (47–48): 1978–1982. PMID 7035316.
- Ottoson, D. (1981). "Sperry has given us a new dimension on views of the higher functions of the brain". Läkartidningen. 78 (43): 3765–3773. PMID 7033697.
