= Linguistic relativity and the color naming debate =

Question regarding language and thought

The concept of linguistic relativity concerns the relationship between language and thought, specifically whether language influences thought, and, if so, how. This question has led to research in multiple disciplines—including anthropology, cognitive science, linguistics, and philosophy. Among the most debated theories in this area of work is the Sapir–Whorf hypothesis. This theory states that the language a person speaks will affect the way that this person thinks. The theory varies between two main proposals: that language structure determines how individuals perceive the world and that language structure influences the world view of speakers of a given language but does not determine it.

There are two formal sides to the color debate, the universalist and the relativist. The universalist side claims that the biology of all human beings is all the same, so the development of color terminology has absolute universal constraints. The relativist side asserts that the variability of color terms cross-linguistically points to more culture-specific phenomena. Because color exhibits both biological and linguistic aspects, it has become a focus of the study of the relationship between language and thought. In a 2006 review of the debate Paul Kay and Terry Regier concluded that "There are universal constraints on color naming, but at the same time, differences in color naming across languages cause differences in color cognition and/or perception."

The color debate was made popular in large part due to Brent Berlin and Paul Kay's 1969 study and their subsequent publishing of Basic Color Terms: Their Universality and Evolution. Although much on color terminology has been done since Berlin and Kay's study, other research predates it, including the mid-nineteenth century work of William Ewart Gladstone and Lazarus Geiger, which also predates the Sapir–Whorf hypothesis, as well as the work of Eric Lenneberg and Roger Brown in 1950s and 1960s.

== Universalist view ==
=== Berlin and Kay ===
The universalist theory that color cognition is an innate, physiological process rather than a cultural one was introduced in 1969 by Brent Berlin and Paul Kay in their book Basic Color Terms: Their Universality and Evolution. Their study was intended to challenge the formerly prevailing theory of linguistic relativity set forth by Edward Sapir and Benjamin Lee Whorf. Berlin and Kay found universal restrictions on the number of basic color terms (BCTs) that a language can have, and on the ways the language can use these terms. The study included data collected from speakers of twenty different languages from a range of language families. Berlin and Kay identified eleven possible basic color categories: white, black, red, green, yellow, blue, brown, purple, pink, orange, and gray. To be considered a basic color category, the term for the color in each language had to meet certain criteria:

1. It is monolexemic (for example, red, not red-yellow or yellow-red.)
2. It is monomorphemic (for example, blue, but not bluish)
3. Its signification is not included in that of any other color term (for example, crimson is a type of red)
4. Its application must not be restricted to a narrow class of objects (for example, blonde is restricted to hair, wood and beer)
5. It must be psychologically salient for informants (for example, "the color of grandma's freezer" is not psychologically salient for all speakers)

In case of doubt, the following "subsidiary criteria" were implemented:

1. The doubtful form should have the same distributional potential as the previously established basic color terms (for example, objects can be described as reddish but not salmonish)
2. Color terms that are also the name of an object characteristically having that color are suspect, for example, gold, silver and ash
3. Recent foreign loan words may be suspect
4. In cases where lexemic status is difficult to assess, morphological complexity is given some weight as a secondary criterion (for example, red-orange might be questionable)

Berlin and Kay also found that, in languages with fewer than the maximum eleven color categories, the colors followed a specific evolutionary pattern. This pattern is as follows:

1. All languages contain terms for black and white.
2. If a language contains three terms, then it contains a term for red.
3. If a language contains four terms, then it contains a term for either green or yellow (but not both).
4. If a language contains five terms, then it contains terms for both green and yellow.
5. If a language contains six terms, then it contains a term for blue.
6. If a language contains seven terms, then it contains a term for brown.
7. If a language contains eight or more terms, then it contains terms for purple, pink, orange or gray.

In addition to following this evolutionary pattern absolutely, each of the languages studied also selected virtually identical focal hues for each color category present. For example, the term for "red" in each of the languages corresponded to roughly the same shade in the Munsell color system. Consequently, they posited that the cognition, or perception, of each color category is also universal.

List of colors in various languages

Language(s)	Black	White	Red	Yellow	Green	Blue	Brown	Grey	Purple	Pink	Orange	Sky Blue/Azure – Cyan/Aqua – Teal/Turquoise
Hebrew	שחור (Shakhor)	לבן (Lavan)	אדום (Adom)	צהוב (Tsahov)	ירוק (Yarok)	כחול (Kakhol)	חום (Khoom)	אפור (Afor)	סגול (Sagol)	ורוד (Varod)	כתום (Katom)	תכלת (Tekhelet)
Latin	Niger	Albus	Ruber	Flavus	Viridis	Cyaneus	Fuscus	Canus	Violaceus – Purpureus	Roseus	Aurantius	Caeruleus
Italian	Nero	Bianco	Rosso	Giallo	Verde	Blu	Marrone	Grigio	Viola	Rosa	Arancione	Azzurro
Romanian	Negru	Alb	Roșu	Galben	Verde	Albastru	Maro	Gri	Violet	Roz	Portocaliu	Bleu
Albanian	Zezë	Bardhë	Kuqe	Verdhë	Jeshile	Blu	Kafe	Gri	Purpurt	Rozë	Portokalli	Kaltër
Greek	Μαύρο (Mávro)	Άσπρο (Áspro)	Κόκκινο (Kókkino)	Κίτρινο (Kítrino)	Πράσινο (Prásino)	Μπλε (Ble)	Καφέ (Kafé)	Γκρι (Gkri)	Μοβ (Mov)	Ροζ (Roz)	Πορτοκαλί (Portokalí)	Γαλάζιο (Galázio)
Armenian	Սեւ (Sew)	Սպիտակ (Spitak)	Կարմիր (Karmir)	Դեղին (Deghin)	Կանաչ (Kanačʿ)	Կապույտ (Kapuyt)	Դարչնագույն (Darčʿnaguyn)	Մոխրագույն (Moxraguyn)	Մանուշակագույն (Manušakaguyn)	Վարդագույն (Vardaguyn)	Նարնջագույն (Narnǰaguyn)	Երկնագույն (Erknaguyn)
Georgian	შავი (Šavi)	თეთრი (Tetri)	წითელი (Citeli)	ყვითელი (Qviteli)	მწვანე (Mc̣vane)	ლურჯი (Lurǯi)	ყავისფერი (Qavisperi)	ნაცრისფერი (Nacrisperi)	მეწამული (Mec̣amuli)	ვარდისფერი (Vardisperi)	ნარინჯისფერი (Narinǯisperi)	ცისფერი (Cisperi)
Turkish	Siyah	Beyaz	Kırmızı	Sarı	Yeşil	Mavi – Lacivert	Kahverengi	Gri	Mor	Pembe	Turuncu	Camgöbeği – Turkuaz
Uyghur	قارا (qara)	ئاق (aq)	قىزىل (qizil)	سېرىق (sëriq)	يېشىل (yëshil)	كۆك (kök)	قوڭۇر (qongur)	كۈلرەڭ (külreng)	سۆسۈن (sösün)	ھالرەڭ (halreng)	نارەنجى (narenji)	سۇس كۆك (sus kök) – كۆكۈچ (köküch)
Kazakh	Қара (Qara)	Ақ (Aq)	Қызыл (Qyzyl)	Сары (Sary)	Жасыл (Jasyr)	Көк (Kök)	Қоңыр (Qoñyr)	Сұр (Sur)	Күлгін (Kulgin)	Қызғылт (Qyzğylt)	Қызғылт сары (Qyzğylt sary)	Көгілдір (Kögildir)
Bulgarian	Черен (Cheren)	Бял (Byal)	Червен (Cherven)	Жълт (Zhãlt)	Зелен (Zelen)	Син (Sin)	Кафяв (Kafyav)	Сив (Siv)	Лилав (Lilav)	Розов (Rozov)	Оранжев (Oranzhev)	Небесносин (Nebesnosin)
Russian	Чёрный (Chornyy)	Белый (Belyy)	Красный (Krasnyy)	Жёлтый (Zholtyy)	Зелёный (Zelyonyy)	Синий (Siniy)	Коричневый (Korichnevyy)	Серый (Seryy)	Фиолетовый (Fioletovyy)	Розовый (Rozovyy)	Оранжевый (Oranzhevyy)	Голубой (Goluboy)
Ukrainian	Чорний (Chornyy)	Білий (Bilyy)	Червоний (Chervonyy)	Жовтий (Zhovtyy)	Зелений (Zelenyy)	Синій (Syniy)	Коричневий (Korychnevyy)	Сірий (Siryy)	Фіолетовий (Fioletovyy)	Рожевий (Rozhevyy)	Оранжевий (Oranzhevyy)	Блаки́тний (Blakýtnyy)/Голуби́й (Holubýy)
Belarusian	Чорны (Čorny)	Белы (Biely)	Чырвоны (Čyrvony)	Жоўты (Žoŭty)	Зялёны (Zialiony)	Сіні (Sini)	Карычневы (Karyčnievy)	Шэры (Šery)	Фіялетавы (Fijalietavy)	Ружовы (Ružovy)	Аранжавы (Aranžavy)	Блакітны (Blakitny)
Polish	Czarny	Biały	Czerwony	Żółty	Zielony	Niebieski	Brązowy	Szary	Fioletowy	Różowy	Pomarańczowy	Błękitny
Czech/Slovak	Černá	Bílá	Červená	Žlutá	Zelená	Modrá	Hnědá	Šedá	Fialová	Růžová	Oranžová	Azurová
Lithuanian	Juoda	Balta	Raudona	Geltona	Žalia	Mėlyna	Ruda	Pilka	Violetinė	Rožinė	Oranžinė	Žydra
Basque	Beltz	Zuri	Gorri	Hori	Berde	Urdin	Marroi	Gris	More	Arrosa	Laranja	Oztin
Portuguese	Preto	Branco	Vermelho	Amarelo	Verde	Azul	Castanho/Marrom	Cinza/Cinzento	Roxo – Violeta	Rosa	Laranja	Ciano / Água-marinha – Turquesa
Spanish	Negro	Blanco	Rojo	Amarillo	Verde	Azul	Marrón/Café	Gris	Violeta – Púrpura/Morado	Rosa(do)	Naranja	Cian / Aguamarina – Turquesa
Catalan	Negre	Blanc	Vermell	Groc	Verd	Blau	Marró	Gris	Porpra	Rosa	Taronja	Cian – Turquesa
French	Noir	Blanc	Rouge	Jaune	Vert	Bleu	Marron/Brun	Gris	Violet	Rose	Orange	Cyan – Turquoise
English	Black	White	Red	Yellow	Green	Blue	Brown	Grey	Purple	Pink	Orange	Cyan – Teal – Turquoise
Afrikaans	Swart	Wit	Rooi	Geel	Groen	Blou	Bruin	Grys	Pers	Pienk	Oranje	Siaan – Turkoois
Dutch/Flemish	Zwart	Wit	Rood	Geel	Groen	Blauw	Bruin	Grijs	Paars	Roze	Oranje	Cyaan
German	Schwarz	Weiß	Rot	Gelb	Grün	Blau	Braun	Grau	Lila	Rosa	Orange	Cyan – Türkis
Norwegian	Svart	Hvit	Rød	Gul	Grønn	Blå	Brun	Grå	Lilla	Rosa	Oransje	Turkis
Danish	Sort	Hvid	Rød	Gul	Grøn	Blå	Brun	Grå	Lilla	Lyserød	Orange	Turkis
Swedish	Svart	Vit	Röd	Gul	Grön	Blå	Brun	Grå	Lila – Purpur	Rosa/Skär	Orange	Cyan – Turkos
Finnish	Musta	Valkoinen	Punainen	Keltainen	Vihreä	Sininen	Ruskea	Harmaa	Violetti	Pinkki	Oranssi	Turkoosi
Estonian	Must	Valge	Punane	Kollane	Roheline	Sinine	Pruun	Hall	Lilla	Roosa	Oranž	Tsüaansinine – Türkiissinine
Latvian	Melns	Balts	Sarkans	Dzeltens	Zaļš	Zils	Brūns	Pelēks	Violets	Rozā	Oranžs	Tirkīzzils/Zilzaļš
Croatian/Serbian	Crna	Bijela	Crvena	Žuta	Zelena	Plava	Smeđa	Siva	Ljubičasta	Ružičasta	Narančasta	Tirkizna
Slovene	Črn	Bel	Rdeč	Rumen	Zelen	Moder	Rjav	Siv	Vijoličen	Roza	Oranžen	Turkizen
Hungarian	Fekete	Fehér	Piros – Vörös	Citromsárga	Zöld	Kék	Barna	Szürke	Lila	Rózsaszín	Narancssárga	Türkiz
Arabic	أسود (Aswad)	أبيض (Abyaḍ)	أحمر (Aḥmar)	أصفر (Aṣfar)	أخضر (Akhḍar)	أزرق (Azraq)	بني (Bunnī)	رمادي (Ramādī)	بنفسجي (Banafsajī)	وردي (Wardī), زهري (Zahrī)	برتقالي (Burtuqālī)	تركوازي (Turkuwāzī)
Persian	سیاه (Siâah)	سفید (Sefid)	قرمز (Qermez)	زرد (Zard)	سبز (Sabz)	آبی (Âabi)	قهوه‌ای (Qahve-i)	خاکستری (Khâakestari)	ارغوانی (Arghavâani)	صورتی (Surati)	نارنجی (Nâaranji)	فیروزه‌ای (Firuze-i)
Hindi	काला (Kaalaa))	सफ़ेद (Safed)	लाल (Laal)	पीला (Peelaa)	हरा (Haraa)	नीला (Neelaa)	भूरा (Bhooraa)	धूसर (Dhoosar)	बैंगनी (Baingnee)	गुलाबी (Gulaabee)	नारंगी (Naarangee)	आसमानी (Aasmaanee)
Punjabi	ਕਾਲਾ (kālā)	ਚਿੱਟੇ (ciṭē)	ਲਾਲ (lāla)	ਪੀਲੇ (pīlē)	ਹਰੇ (harē)	ਨੀਲਾ (nīlā)	ਭੂਰਾ (bhūrā)	ਸਲੇਟੀ (salēṭī)	ਜਾਮਨੀ (jāmanī)	ਗੁਲਾਬੀ (gulābī)	ਸੰਤਰੀ (satarī)	ਅਸਮਾਨੀ (asamānī)
Assamese	ক'লা (Kóla)	বগা (Boga)	ৰঙা (Ronga)	হালধীয়া (Halodhia)	সেউজীয়া (Xeuzia)	নীলা (Nila)	মটীয়া (Motia)	ধোঁৱা বৰণীয়া (Dhü͂a boronia)	বেঙুনীয়া (Bengunia)	গুলপীয়া (Gulopia)	কমলা (Komola)	ফিরোজা (Firoja)
Tamil	கருப்பு (karuppu)	வெள்ளை (veḷḷai)	சிவப்பு (civappu)	மஞ்சள் (mañcaḷ)	பச்சை (paccai)	நீலம் (nīlam)	மண்ணிறம் (maṇṇiṟam)	சாம்பல்நிறம் (cāmpalniṟam)	ஊதா (ūtā)	இளஞ்சிவப்பு (iḷañcivappu)	செம்மஞ்சள் (cemmañcaḷ)	இளநீலம் (iḷanīlam) – டர்க்கைஸ் (ṭarkkais)
Swahili	-eusi	-eupe	-ekundu	-a njano, -a manjano, -a kimanjano	-a kijani, -a kibichi	-a bluu, -a buluu	-a hudhurangi, -a kahawia	-a kijivu	-a zambarau, -a urujuani	-a waridi, -a pinki	-a machungwa	-a samawati
Lojban	xekri	blabi	xunre	pelxu	crino	blanu	bunre	grusi	zirpu	blabi – xunre – nukni	narju	cicna
Chinese	黑色 (Hēisè)	白色 (Báisè)	紅色/红色 (Hóngsè)	黄色 (Huángsè)	綠色/绿色 (Lǜ sè)	藍色/蓝色 (Lánsè)	棕色 (Zōngsè)/褐色 (Hè sè)	灰色 (Huīsè)	紫色 (Zǐsè)	粉紅色/粉红色 (Fěnhóngsè)	橙色 (Chéngsè)	青色 (Qīngsè)
Japanese	黒 (Kuro)	白 (Shiro)	赤 (Aka)	黄 (Ki)	緑 (Midori)	青 (Ao)	茶色 (Chairo)	灰色 (Haiiro)/グレー (Gurei)	紫 (Murasaki)	桃色 (Momoiro)/ピンク (Pinku)	橙色 (Daidaiiro)/オレンジ (Orenji)	水色 (Mizuiro)
Korean	검정 (geom-jeong)/검은색 (geom-eun-saek)	하양 (ha-yang)/하얀색 (ha-yan-saek)	빨강 (bbal-gang)/빨간색 (bbal-gan-saek)	노랑 (no-rang)/노란색 (no-ran-saek)	초록 (cho-rok)/초록색 (cho-rok-saek)/녹색 (nok-saek)	파랑 (pa-rang)/파란색 (pa-ran-saek) – 남색 (nam-saek)	갈색 (gal-saek)	회색 (hoe-saek)	보라 (bo-ra)/보라색 (bo-ra-saek)	분홍 (bun-hong)/분홍색 (bun-hong-saek)	주황 (ju-hwang)/주황색 (ju-hwang-saek)/오렌지 (o-ren-ji)/오렌지색 (o-ren-ji-saek)	하늘색 (ha-neul-saek) – 옥색 (ok-saek)
Thai	ดำ (dam)	ขาว (kǎao)	แดง (dɛɛng)	เหลือง (lʉ̌ʉang)	เขียว (kǐao)	น้ำเงิน (nám-ngən)	น้ำตาล (nám-dtaan)	เทา (tao)	ม่วง (mûuang)	ชมพู (chom-puu)	ส้ม (sôm)	ฟ้า (fáa)
Javanese	ireng/cemeng	putih/pethak	abang/abrit	kuning	ijo/ijem	biru	coklat/soklat	abu-abu	ungu/wungu/kembang térông	jambon	oranye/kuning télô	biru muda
Indonesian	hitam	putih	merah	kuning	hijau	biru	cokelat	abu-abu	ungu	patma	jingga	biru pirus, toska
Filipino	Itim	Puti	Pula	Dilaw	Lungtian	Bughaw	Tsokolate/Kayumanggi	Kulay-Abo	Biyoleta – Morado/Lila/Ube	Kulay-Rosas	Kahel/Dalandan	Turkesa
Cebuano	Itóm	Putî	Pulá	Dalág	Lunhaw	Bughaw	Tabonon	Abohon	Tapól	Limbahon, Puláng Luspad	Kahil, Maraag, Pulagáw	Bughaw lunhaw
Icelandic	Svartur	Hvitur	Rauður	Gulur	Grænn	Blár	Brúnn	Grár	Fjólublár	Bleikur	Appelsínugulur	Blágrænn
Irish	Dubh	Bán	Dearg	Buí	Glas	Gorm	Donn	Liath	Corcra	Bándearg	Flannbhuí/Oráiste	Gormghlas
Welsh	Du	Gwyn	Coch	Melyn	Gwyrdd	Glas	Brown	Llwyd	Porffor	Pinc	Oren	Gwyrddlas/Glaswyrdd

=== Additional universalist arguments ===
A later study supporting this universal, physiological theory was done by Kessen, Bornstein, and Weiskopf. In this study, sixteen four-month-old infants were presented with lights of different frequencies corresponding to different colors. The lengths of habituation were measured and found to be longer when the infant was presented with successive hues surrounding a certain focal color than with successive focal colors. This pattern of response is what is expected when the infants are distinguishing between the focal colors, but not distinguishing between successive hues (i.e. different shades of red are all "red" but "blue" and "red" focal colors are different). This is to say that infants respond to different hues of color in much the same way as adults do, demonstrating the presence of color vision at an age younger than previously expected. Kessen, Bornstein and Weiskopf therefore claim that the ability to perceive the same distinct focal colors is present even in small children.

=== Research before Berlin and Kay (1969) ===
==== Gladstone and Geiger ====
In their paper Language and thought: Which side are you on anyway?, Regier et al. discuss the presence of a universalist perspective on the color debate in the mid-twentieth century.

==== Lenneberg and Roberts ====
Lenneberg and Roberts presented their paper The Denotata of Color Terms at the Linguistic Society of America in 1953. In this paper they reported their findings on color recall in Zuni speakers. Zuni has one color term for yellow and orange, and Lenneberg and Roberts's study reported that Zuni speakers encountered greater difficulty in color recall for these colors than English speakers, who have available terms to distinguish them. Brown and Lenneberg attributed this effect to the property of codability.

Linguistic codability is whether naming an object is difficult or not. It also includes a focus on the effect that naming can have on behavior and cognition.

==== Brown and Lenneberg ====
Brown and Lenneberg published A Study in Language and Cognition in 1954, in which they discussed the effect of codability on recognition. In their experiment they used a series of Munsell chips to test color recall and recognition in English speakers. Their findings suggested that the availability of a basic color term in a given language affected the retention of that color in recall testing. Brown and Lenneberg linked their study to Lenneberg and Roberts's 1953 findings on color recall in Zuni speakers.

== Relativist view ==
Initially, Berlin and Kay's theory received little direct criticism. But in the decades since their 1969 book, a significant scholarly debate has developed surrounding the universalism of color terminology. Multiple relativists find significant issues with this universalism. Discussed below, Barbara Saunders and John A. Lucy are two scholars who are prominent advocates of the opposing relativist position. Also, Daniel Everett's work on the Pirahã language of the Brazilian Amazon, a controversial case, found several peculiarities, including what he interpreted as the Pirahã language's lack of color terms in the way those are otherwise defined. Everett's conclusions were met with skepticism from universalists, who claimed that the linguistic deficit is explained by the lack of need for such concepts.

=== Barbara Saunders ===
Barbara Saunders believes that Berlin and Kay's theory of basic color terminology contains several unspoken assumptions and significant flaws in research methodology. Included in these assumptions is an ethnocentric bias based on traditions of Western scientific and philosophical thought. She regards the evolutionary component of Berlin and Kay's theory as "an endorsement of the idea of progress" and references Smart's belief that it is "a Eurocentric narrative that filters everything through the West and its values and exemplifies a universal evolutionary process of modernization."

With regard to Berlin and Kay's research, Saunders criticizes the translation methods used for the color terms they gathered from the 78 languages they had not studied directly. Like a number of others, she also questions the effectiveness of using the Munsell color system in the elicitation of color terminology and identification of focal hues. She feels that "use of this chart exemplifies one of the mistakes commonly made by the social sciences: that of taking data-sets as defining a (laboratory) phenomenon which supposedly represents the real world", and entails "taking a picture of the world for the world and then claiming that that picture is the concept". Finally, she takes issue with the anomalous cases of color term use that she believes Berlin, Kay and Merrifield disregarded in their work on the World Color Survey for the purpose of purifying their results.

In Saunders's 1997 article with van Brakel, they criticize the amount of weight given to the study of physiological color perception as support for the universalism of color terminology. They primarily criticize the idea that there is an autonomous neuro-physiological color pathway, citing a lack of concrete evidence for its existence.

Saunders is also bothered by the overall de-contextualization of color terminology and the failure of universalists to address the limitations of their methodologies. She points out that:

Ordinary colour talk is used in a variety of ways – for flat coloured surfaces, surfaces of natural objects, patches of paintings, transparent objects, shining objects, the sky, flames, illumination, vapours, volumes, films and so on, all of which interact with overall situation, illumination, edges, textures, patternings and distances, making the concept of sameness of colour inherently indeterminate.

=== John Lucy ===
John A. Lucy's criticisms of Berlin and Kay's theory are similar to those of Saunders and other relativists, primarily focusing on shortcomings in research methodologies and the assumptions that underlie them.

Lucy believes that there are problems with how linguistic analysis has been used to characterize the meanings of color terms across languages. Referential range (what a color term can refer to) and grammatical distribution (how the term can be used) are two dimensions Lucy believes are critical to defining the meaning of a term, both of which "are routinely ignored in research on color terms which focuses primarily on denotational overlap across languages without any consideration of the typical use of the terms or their formal status." He also feels that any attempt to contrast color term systems requires understanding of each individual language and the systems it uses to structure reference.

Lucy also believes that there is significant bias present in the design of Berlin and Kay's research, due to their English-speaking and Western points of view. He thinks the use of the Munsell color system demonstrates their adherence to the ideas that "speech is about labeling accuracy" and that "Meaning is really about accurate denotation," which he believes "...both derive directly from the folk understandings of English speakers about how their language works." He refers to Conklin's study of Hanunóo as a demonstration of what a study might reveal about a language's color term system when such bias is not present. He demonstrates that "an 'adequate knowledge' of the system would never have been produced by restricting the stimuli to color chips and the task of labeling" (original emphasis).

In summation, he feels that the approach universalists have taken in researching color term universals sets up a procedure that "...guarantees both their discovery and their form," and that, "It does not really even matter whether the researchers involved are open-minded and consciously willing to recognize relativism as a possible outcome—because the universalist conclusion is guaranteed by their methodological assumptions."

== Recent scholarship ==
Scholarship on color vision has proceeded in three principal domains within the last twenty years. There have been revisions to the Berlin and Kay hypothesis; in response, there have been continued challenges to that hypothesis; and lastly, the field of vision science has expanded to explore hue categorization at a perceptual level, independent of language-based distinctions, possibly offering compromise in the two polar theories.

=== Revisions of the Berlin and Kay hypothesis ===
In 1999 Paul Kay and Luisa Maffi published an article entitled Color Appearance and the Emergence and Evolution of Basic Color Lexicons, in which they outline a series of revisions in response to data collected in the World Color Survey (WCS) and to Stephen Levinson and his work on the Yele language of Papua New Guinea. While upholding an evolutionary track for the addition of basic color terms (BCTs) to any given lexicon, they outlined a series of three Partition Rules (i.e., superordinate rules that determine the evolution of BCTs):

1. Black and White (Bk&W): Distinguish black and white.
2. Warm and Cool (Wa&C): Distinguish the warm primaries (red and yellow) from the cool primaries (green and blue).
3. Red: Distinguish red.

The ordering of these rules is reflective of the data of the overwhelming majority of languages studied in the WCS. However, exceptions do exist, as was accounted for by Yele and other languages within the WCS. Furthermore, they also propose a 0) rule, one which simply states: partition. Such a rule is necessary to motivate the specification of later basic color terms, namely those that can no longer be brought about by application of rules 1)–3).

Concerning the evolution of color terms within a given lexicon, Kay and Maffi further outlined the possibilities of different trajectories of evolution, though all of those numerically possible are not attested in the World Color Survey. Another significant contribution of this article is a discussion of the Emergence Hypothesis, its relation to the Yele language, and its motivation for the authors' revision of evolutionary trajectories.

Using a phylogenetic approach, Bowern & Haynie found support for Berlin & Kay hypothesis in the Pama–Nyungan languages, as well as other alternative trajectories for gaining and losing color terms.

=== Opposition to Berlin and Kay et al. ===
There are three approaches to such criticisms:

1. Those brought about by implications within the taxonomic structure of the B&K model (as seen further in Berlin's treatment of ethnobiological systems of classification)
2. Those as seen in research in color perception in children and infants
3. Those brought about by specific fieldwork

==== Levinson and the Yele language ====
The Yele language is a language isolate spoken on Rossel Island in Papua New Guinea. Among observations about the class, derivation, usage of, and disagreement over, color naming words in Yele is a critique of the BCT-model's assumption that languages which have not yet fully lexicalized the semantic space of color (as was posited to be universal in the original and subsequent B&K papers [1969 &1978]) with the use of all eleven basic color names do so by use of the fewer composite terms that they do possess (by B&K's criteria for Yele, three). As Stephen Levinson argues using methodology similar to that used by B&K for their initial tests and later for the WCS, there are simply regions of the color spectrum for which Yele has no name, and which are not subsumed by larger composite categories, even despite the inventive nature of color terms in Yele that fall outside the criteria for "basic" status. Given the fact that such color naming words are extremely inventive, (a "semi-productive" mode of adjectival derivation is the duplication of related nouns), Levinson argues that this is highly detrimental to the BCT-theory, insomuch that Yele is "a language where a semantic field of color has not yet jelled", and thus one not open to universal constraint.

As Levinson points out, there is evidence that supports the emergence of BCTs through physical objects and words used to signify simultaneous properties such as lightness. As such, these terms do not cohere as a unique, separable semantic domain denoting hue (see Bornstein for this criterion). Over time, though, and through processes of semantic change, such a domain can emerge. In response to work by Levinson and Lyons, Kay dubs this perspective the Emergence Hypothesis (EH). (See Levinson's article for a discussion on the co-existing evolutionary tracks for color words if one accepts both B&K's position and the Emergence Hypothesis.) Kay & Maffi (1999) incorporate the EH into their evolutionary track by removing from their model the assumption that languages begin by fully segmenting the color spectrum. This inverts their Partition Principles (see above), namely by placing 1) and 3) over 0) and 2). That is, languages partially segment the space into black, white, and red (i.e., 1) & 3)), and then the assignment to partition (0)) and split warm and cool colors (2)) accommodates the rest of the space. As Kay & Maffi explain, this is essential to explications of Y/G/Bu terms (e.g., Cree), which were previously incompatible with the model. However, this model also introduces the possibility for previously divergent evolutionary paths for color terms, since it is only after the rearrangement and reassignment of the Partition Principles that a language that derived from EH origins joins with a language that originally partitioned the whole of the color spectrum.

==== Anna Wierzbicka and universals of visual semantics ====
In an article titled The Semantics of Colour: A New Paradigm, Wierzbicka discusses three main critiques of the universalist approach:

1. The inability to prove the existence of true color terms (i.e., those based on variations in hue) in languages that lack a superordinate word for color in their taxonomies
2. The lack of inquiry into the semantic range of any given language's assumed color naming.
3. That the Western universalist tradition "[imposes] on other languages and cultures one's own conceptual grid" and does not reflect " 'the native's point of view'", citing Malinowski in the latter.

With regard to 1), she states that "the basic point ... is that, in many languages, one cannot ask the question, 'What color is it?'" The assumption oscillates between two versions: on the one hand she argues that languages with no superordinate word for color simply do not have minimal color terms. On the other hand, she argues that even if one contests the first point (i.e., agree that languages that lack a word for color still have color terms), the fact that one cannot ask the question she posits (above) means that color is not a salient semantic domain in these languages. In the structure of her Natural Semantic Metalanguage, color does not constitute a semantic "primitive", though she argues for multiple others cross-linguistically. (For more on the NSM related to color terms, see Theoretical Linguistics 29:3.)

==== Pitchford and Mullen: The developmental acquisition of basic colour terms ====
This study compares the evolutionary model of color terms of Berlin and Kay to the acquisition of color terms in children (something which has been thought to lag behind other lexical acquisitions). Their study proceeds to three main questions:

1. Are color terms acquired late?
2. Are basic color terms acquired in a fixed developmental order?
3. What factors may influence the acquisition of basic color terms?

With regard to 1), they find that color terms are not acquired any later than other relevant lexemes to distinguish objects. It had been thought, for example, that since color is not necessarily unique to a given object, and diverse objects are more likely to share common color than a common shape, that color terms lagged behind shape terms in development. This was found not to be the case.

Second, they found no correlation between the order of color term acquisition in children and in languages generally. It was found that gray and brown are learned later in development; there was no preference for the six primary color terms over the remaining three secondary ones. The similarity between the acquisition of these terms in children and in language vocabularies was assumed to be comparable, since even in current notions of the B&K hypothesis the evolutionary order of color terms is thought to be based on universals of neurophysiology. While some studies in neurophysiology have shown greater salience for the basic color terms (and thus correlate their earlier evolutionary status), neurophysiology has not been able to account for such phenomena as intuitive separations of warm and cool colors (the second partition rule posited by Kay [see above] is essential to such early-onset warm/cool distinctions, yet is overridden in language with a yellow/green/blue color term).

=== Vision science and theoretical compatibility ===
Marc Bornstein's essay Hue Categorization and Color Naming: Physics to Sensation to Perception separates an analytical review of vision science and color naming into three sections:

1. Categorization and its aids to both perceptual and cognitive functions generally
2. Color vision and hue categorization
3. Color naming (an unarticulated derivative of the first two ideas [see his companion essay Hue Categorization and Color Naming: Cognition to Language to Culture for a further discussion of this point])

As a result, he summarizes both the findings of vision science (as it relates to color naming) and the linking of three separate but causally related processes within the study of color naming phenomena. He states that "the physics of color, the psychophysics of color discrimination, and the psychology of color naming are not isomorphic". The color spectrum clearly exists at a physical level of wavelengths (inter al.), humans cross-linguistically tend to react most saliently to the primary color terms (a primary motive of Bornstein's work and vision science generally) as well as select similar exemplars of these primary color terms, and lastly comes the process of linguistic color naming, which adheres both to universal patterns but demonstrates individual uniqueness. While one may have origins in its predecessor, variation among test subjects in vision science and linguistic variation demonstrate that it is not a process of whole causality. In his companion essay, he demonstrates that this process of causality may indeed be reversed, which he explains through a set of "models of development":

1. Undeveloped
2. Partially developed
3. Fully developed

In response, there are three ways that outside experience may affect this development: through (A) induction, (B) modification, or (C) deprivation. Thus the logical possibilities are 1A & 1C; 2A, 2B & 2C; and 3B & 3C. Using this format, he explains that developmental altering in hue categories "entail perceptual 'sharpening' and 'broadening'". He attributes this to either "maturation" (perceptually) or "experience". Such a conclusion is necessarily indeterminate because understanding of why certain hue categories are lost and others induced (cf. developmental processes above) "requires further exacting research". Coming from these two perspectives (i.e., those outlined in the causation above, and the models of development), this leads Bornstein to conclude that "there appear to be nontrivial biological constraints on color categorization [and that] ... the available evidence seems compatible with a position of moderate universality that leads to expectations of probabilistic rather than deterministic cross-cultural correspondence", and that "in color, relativism appears to overlay a universalist foundation".

=== Probabilistic inference ===
Probabilistic inference uses probabilistic models that describe the problem in terms of probability theory and probability distributions. The research article "The Sapir–Whorf Hypothesis and Probabilistic Inference: Evidence from the Domain of Color" seeks to clarify the argument through the lens of probabilistic inference. The probabilistic model is a conjunction of both a universal color space and a language-specific categorical organization of that space. This approach realizes that color cognition involves an interaction between these two tiers. There are incursions of linguistic categorization into nonlinguistic processes of thinking, and taking the Sapir–Whorf hypothesis does not necessarily entail a complete rejection of the universal components of human cognition. The probabilistic model is useful because multiple findings to support the Sapir–Whorf hypothesis do not replicate reliably. Framing the issue in terms of probabilistic inference addresses this issue by highlighting the role of uncertainty.

=== Nonlinguistic influences on color memory ===
It is unlikely that linguistic factors are the sole component to differences in color perception across cultures. The culture differences in color naming and color perception can be extended to nonlinguistic factors. Color in the environment determines the language individuals of that group use in colloquial conversation. Thus, the communicability scores of color categories depends partly on the language, and even more so on the salient objects in the environment. In other words, for colors to be differentiated, they have to be already readily available in the individual or cultural group's environment.

=== Color significance across cultures ===
The significance of colors differs widely from culture to culture, which in turn affects the perception of different color hues between different nation-states. Cultures assign different meanings to colors due to religious influences and social beliefs. Differences in color categorization between languages are caused by differences in the overall usefulness of color to a culture or language group. Different areas of the world can differ widely in environment and the colors readily available in that environment. These environmental differences can also have an influence on color naming. The saliency and use of objects in a culture provides direct contribution to the color significance and color naming in that culture.

== See also ==
- Eskimo words for snow
- Blue–green distinction in language
