= Color term =

Word or phrase that refers to a specific color

Color wheels with English color terms for RYB (above) and CMYK (below) approaches

A color term (or color name) is a word or phrase that refers to a specific color. The color term may refer to human perception of that color (which is affected by visual context) which is usually defined according to the Munsell color system, or to an underlying physical property (such as a specific wavelength on the spectrum of visible light). There are also numerical systems of color specification, referred to as color spaces.

An important distinction must be established between color and shape, as these two attributes usually are used in conjunction with one another when describing in language. For example, they are labeled as alternative parts of speech terms color term and shape term.

Psychological conditions for recognition of colors exist, such as those who cannot discern colors in general or those who see colors as sound (a variety of synesthesia).

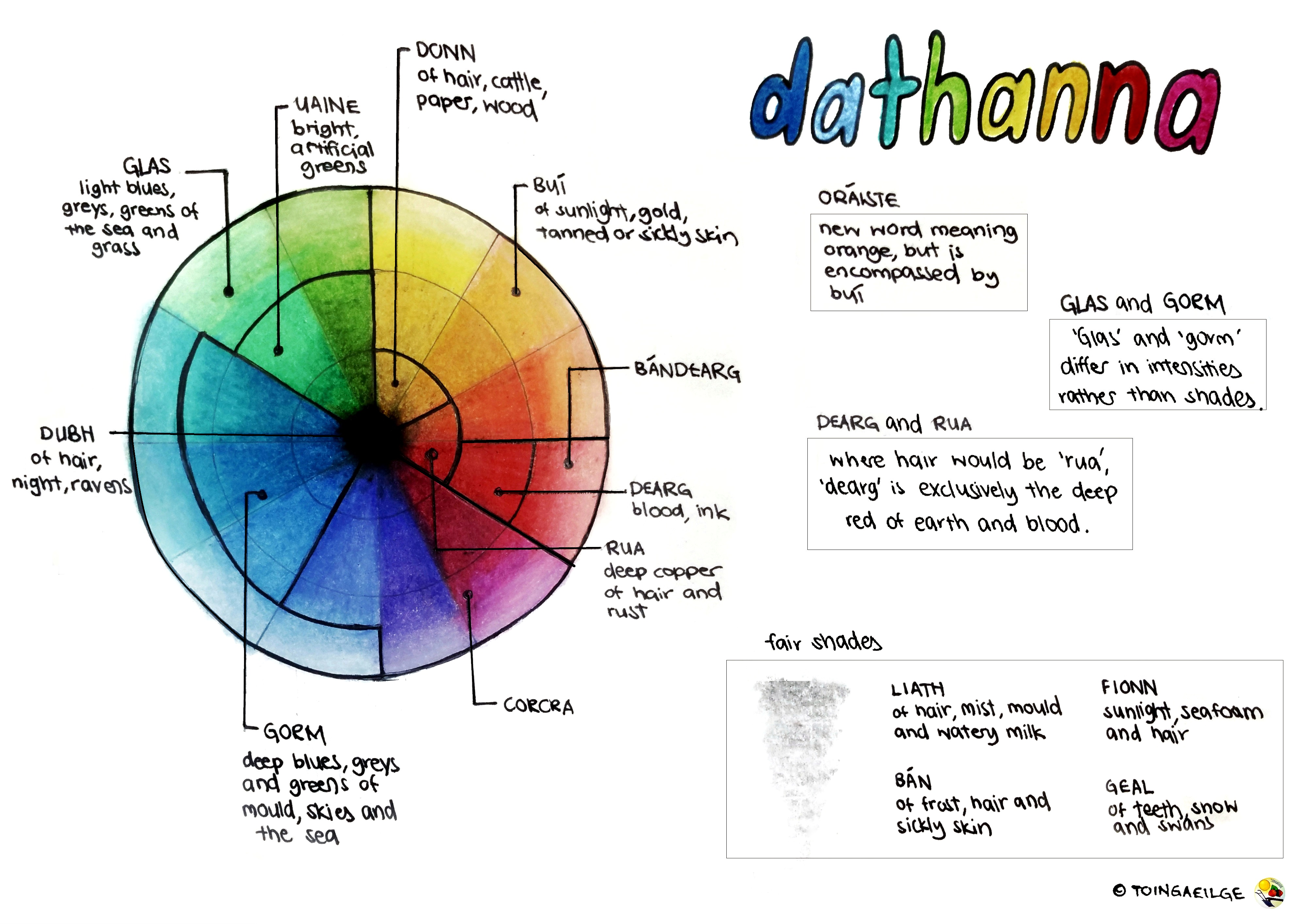
Color wheel with Irish color terms, explaining that glas ("pale blue/grey/green") and gorm ("deep blue/grey/green") are distinguished based on intensity (luminosity) rather than hue. Similarly, buí refers not only to "yellow" and "gold", but pale browns as "buff beige" and "ochre", while dunn is for darker browns. Rua refers to red of hair (fox, robin), whereas dearg refers to red of blood and bándearg is "pale red". Then, Bán, fionn, geal, and liath all refer to varying degrees of brightness or "fairness" — without mapping clearly only the English "white" — against dubh for "dark" or "black".

== Color dimensions ==
Typical human color vision is trichromatic, meaning it is based on a three-dimensional color gamut. These three dimensions can be defined in different ways, but often the most intuitive definition are the dimensions of the HSL/HSV color space:

- Hue: representing the different colors of the rainbow or color wheel (e.g. 'red', 'orange', 'yellow', etc.); roughly analogous to the color's wavelength or frequency.
- Saturation: the colorfulness of the color, i.e. a measure of vibrant vs. pale.
- Luminosity: a measurement of intensity or 'brightness'.

== In natural languages ==
=== Lexicology ===
Monolexemic color words are composed of individual lexemes, or root words, such as 'red', 'brown', 'fuchsia', or 'olive'. The root words generally describe the hue of the color, but some root words—namely brown—can also describe the other dimensions. Compound color words make use of prefix adjectives (e.g. 'light brown', 'sea green'), that generally describe the saturation or luminosity, or compounded basic color words (e.g. 'yellow-green'), which refine the hue of the color relative to root words. Vaaleanpunainen, the Finnish word for 'pink', is a clear agglutination of the language's words for 'pale' (vaalea) and 'red' (punainen).

=== Basic color terms ===
Basic color terms meet the following criteria:

- monolexemic ('green', but not 'light green' or 'forest green'),
- high-frequency, and
- agreed upon by speakers of that language.

English has 11 basic color terms according to Brent Berlin and Paul Kay: black, white, red, green, yellow, blue, brown, orange, pink, purple, and gray; other languages have between 2 and 12. All other colors are considered by most speakers of that language to be variants of these basic color terms. A useful litmus test involves replacing each of these basic terms with an approximation of other basic terms, e.g. replacing orange with red-yellow. If the approximation is jarring, the replaced term likely meets the requirement for being a basic color term. An example of a color that comes close to being a basic color term in English is turquoise. It is monolexemic, but is not very high frequency, especially compared to alternatives teal or cyan. It also generally fails the above litmus test in that most people do not find the use of the approximation of other basic color terms (blue-green) to be jarring.

=== Color-term hierarchy ===
In the classic study of Brent Berlin and Paul Kay (1969), Basic Color Terms: Their Universality and Evolution, the researchers argued that the differences in number of basic color terms in languages follow a repeatable pattern. Color terms can be organized into a coherent hierarchy and there are a limited number of universal basic color terms which begin to be used by individual cultures in a relatively fixed order. This order is defined in stages I to VII. Berlin and Kay originally based their analysis on a comparison of color words in 20 languages from around the world. The model is presented below, broken into stages, with stage I on the left and stage VII on the right:
$\begin{Bmatrix}\text{white} \\ \text{black} \end{Bmatrix} < \text{red} < \begin{Bmatrix}\text{green} \\ \text{yellow} \end{Bmatrix} < \text{blue} < \text{brown} <\begin{Bmatrix}\text{purple} \\ \text{pink} \\ \text{orange} \\ \text{grey} \end{Bmatrix}$

Berlin and Kay's study identified seven stages of color distinction systems. Each progressive stage features a color term that the previous stages do not.

==== Stage I (dark and light) ====
Stage I	light–warm (white/yellow/red) dark–cool (black/blue/green)

Stage I contains two terms, white and black (light and dark); these terms are referenced broadly to describe other undefined color terms. For example, the Yali highland group in New Guinea identify the color of blood as black. This is because blood, as a relatively dark liquid, is grouped into the same color classification as black.

In the Bassa language, there are two terms for classifying colors: ziza (white, yellow, orange, and red) and hui (black, violet or purple, blue, and green).

In the Pirahã language, there appear to be no color terms beyond describing lightness and darkness.

The Dani language of western New Guinea differentiates only two basic colors: mili for cool/dark shades such as blue, green, and black; and mola for warm/light colors such as red, yellow, and white.

==== Stage II (red) ====
Stage II	white red/yellow black/blue/green

Stage II implements a third term for red. Objects begin to rely less on their brightness for classification and instead, each term cover a larger scope of colors. Specifically, blue and other darker shades continue to be described as black, yellow and orange colors are classified with red, and other bright colors continue to be classified with white.

In the Bambara language, there are three color terms: dyema (white, beige), blema (reddish, brownish), and fima (dark green, indigo, and black).

==== Stage III/IV (yellow + green) ====
Stage III	white red yellow black/blue/green	white red yellow/green/blue black	white red/yellow green/blue black

Stage III identifies a third term referring either to green (IIIa) or yellow (IIIb). Most languages in the study with this system identify yellow over green, such as the Komi language, where green is considered a shade of yellow (виж, vizh), called турун виж (turun vizh) 'grass yellow'. However, the Nigerian Ibibio language and the Philippine Hanunoo language both identify green instead of yellow.

The Ovahimba use four color names: zuzu stands for dark shades of blue, red, green, and purple; vapa is white and some shades of yellow; buru is some shades of green and blue; and dambu is some other shades of green, red, and brown. It is thought that this may increase the time it takes for the Ovahimba to distinguish between two colors that fall under the same Herero color category, compared to people whose language separates the colors into two different color categories.

Stage IV	white red yellow green black/blue	white red yellow green/blue black

Stage IV incorporates green or yellow, whichever was not already present, i.e. stage IIIa languages will adopt yellow and stage IIIb languages will adopt green. Most stage IV languages continue to colexify blue and green, as listed in Blue–green distinction in language.

The Chinese character 青 (pronounced qīng in Mandarin and ao in Japanese) has a meaning that covers both blue and green. In more contemporary terms, they are 藍 (lán, in Mandarin) and 綠 (lǜ, in Mandarin) respectively. Japanese also has two terms that refer specifically to the color green, 緑 (midori, derived from the classical Japanese descriptive verb midoru 'to be in leaf, to flourish' in reference to trees) and グリーン (guriin, which is derived from the English word 'green').

==== Stage V (blue) ====
Stage V	white red yellow green blue black

Stage V introduces blue as its own color term, differentiating from black or from green.

==== Stage VI (brown) ====
The seventh basic color term is likely to be brown.

In English, this is the first basic color term (other than black and white) that is not differentiated on hue, but rather on lightness. English splits some hues into several distinct colors according to lightness: such as red and pink or orange and brown. To English speakers, these pairs of colors, which are objectively no more different from one another than light green and dark green, are conceived of as belonging to different categories.

==== Stage VII ====
Stage VII adds additional terms for orange, pink, purple, or gray, but these do not exhibit the same hierarchy as the previous seven colors.

English contains eleven basic color terms: 'black', 'white', 'red', 'green', 'yellow', 'blue', 'brown', 'orange', 'pink', 'purple', and 'gray'.

==== Stage VII+ ====
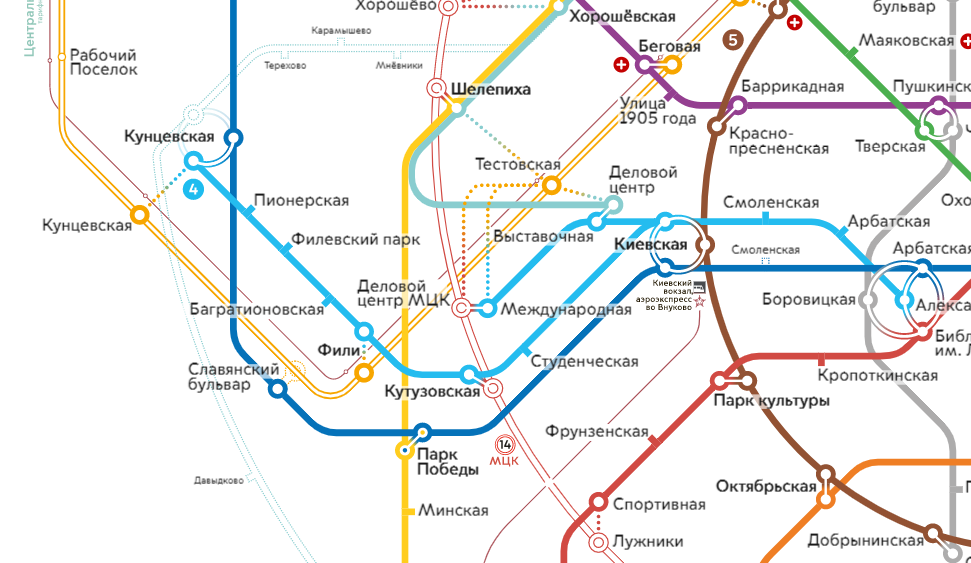
Use of light-blue (голубой, goluboy) and dark-blue (синий, siniy) colors for different lines of the Moscow Metro

Languages with further color distinction use relativistic light/dark terms like light blue / dark blue (in comparison to blue sky / blue ocean), or pale red / deep red.

Italian, Russian and Hebrew have twelve basic color terms, each distinguishing blue and light blue. A Russian will make the same red/pink and orange/brown distinctions, but will also make a further distinction between синий (siniy) and голубой (goluboy), which English speakers would call dark and light blue. To Russian speakers, siniy and goluboy are as separate as red and pink, or orange and brown.

Hungarian and Turkish distinguish multiple words for 'red': piros and vörös (Hungarian; vörös is a darker red), and kırmızı, al, and kızıl (Turkish); kırmızı now includes all reds but originally referred to crimson, to which it is cognate, while kızıl mainly refers to scarlet and other orange-tinted or brownish reds. Two words for 'red' are also found in Irish and Scottish Gaelic: (dearg for light, bright red and rua or ruadh respectively for dark, brownish red). Turkish also has two words for 'white' (beyaz and ak) and 'black' (siyah and kara). Ak and beyaz have the same meaning, while kara is a broader term than siyah and also includes dark browns; which word is used also depends on the kind of object being described. Both ak and kara are of Turkic origin, while siyah is borrowed from Persian, and beyaz from Arabic بياض bayāḍ.

In Serbo-Croatian there are differences in dark brown (mrk), brown (smeđ and kestenjast), red (crven), pink (ružičast), and orange (narandžast), as well as in blue hues: navy blue (teget), dark blue (modar), blue (plav), and ash blue (sinj).

A case that deviates from this pattern is Irish's two words for green:

- glas denotes the green color of plants
- uaine denotes artificial greens of dyes, paints etc.

This distinction is made even if two shades are identical. Glas is also used for "natural" grays, such as the gray squirrel, iora glas.

==== Linguistic relativity ====
These colors roughly correspond to the sensitivities of the retinal ganglion cells, leading Berlin and Kay to argue that color naming is not merely a cultural phenomenon, but is one that is also constrained by biology—that is, language is shaped by perception. A 2012 study suggested that the origin of this hierarchy may be tied to human vision and the time ordering in which these color names get accepted or agreed upon in a population perfectly matches the order predicted by the hierarchy.

=== Non-hue terms ===
This article mostly describes the color terms that define the hue of a color, since hue is considered the most innate dimension of the three. However, other terms are often used to describe the other two dimensions, which can be seen as common prefixes to the root terms that generally describe hue. Adding prefixes to root color terms generates multilexemic colors. Examples of common prefix adjectives can be seen in a list of color names and are described:

- Brightness: can describe either high luminosity or high saturation, according to the Helmholtz–Kohlrausch effect and/or Hunt effect.
- Lightness: describes both a high luminosity and low saturation
- Darkness: the opposite of lightness, or low luminosity
- Paleness, dullness: a measure of desaturation
- Deep, Royal: may refer to darkness and/or high saturation; unrelated to color depth.
- Pure, Bold, Vivid, Rich: all referring to high saturation
- Pastel: refers to colors with high luminosity and low saturation.
- Neon: bright, in either of the word's connotations; alluding to the bright glow of neon lighting.
- Fluorescent: very bright, sometimes also highly saturated. Named after the fluorescence effect of pigments and dyes, which can produce a luminous glow when viewed under ultraviolet light, thereby appearing significantly brighter than their surroundings.

=== Non-dimensional terms ===
Other terms sometimes used to describe color are related to physical phenomenon that do not describe a single color, but describe the dynamic nature of an object's color. These include:

- Glossy: whether the surface reflects diffusely or specularly (sharply)
- Metallic: distinguishing 'gold' and 'silver' from shades of 'yellow' and 'gray', respectively
- Iridescent: dependence of color on viewing angle, innate to structural coloration
- Opacity: opaque (solid) vs. translucent (transparent or see-through)

=== Abstract and descriptive color terms ===
Color terms can be classified as abstract or descriptive, though the distinction is often unclear.

Abstract color terms refer only to the color they represent and any etymological link to an object of that color is lost. In English white, black, red, yellow, green, blue, brown, and gray are abstract color terms. These terms are also basic color terms (as described above), though other abstract terms like maroon and magenta are not considered basic color terms.

Descriptive color terms are secondarily used to describe a color but primarily refer to an object or phenomenon. 'Salmon', 'rose', 'saffron', and 'lilac' are descriptive color terms in English because their use as color terms is derived in reference to natural colors of salmon flesh, rose flowers, infusions of saffron pistils, and lilac blossoms respectively.

Abstract color terms in one language may be represented by descriptive color terms in another; for example in Japanese pink is momoiro (桃色, lit. 'peach-color') and gray is either haiiro or nezumiiro (灰色, 鼠色, lit. 'ash-color' for light grays and 'mouse-color' for dark grays respectively). Nevertheless, as languages evolve they may adopt or invent new abstract color terms, as Japanese has adopted pinku (ピンク) for pink and gurē (グレー) for gray from English.

While most of the 11 basic color terms in English are decidedly abstract, three of them (all stage VII, so understandably the youngest basic color terms) are arguably still descriptive:

- Pink was originally a descriptive color term derived from the name of a flower called a 'pink'. However, because the word 'pink' is rarely used to refer to the flower anymore, relative to its common usage as a color, it is often regarded as an abstract color term.
- Purple is another example of this shift, as it was originally a word that referred to the dye named Tyrian purple, which took its name from the Latin purpura, which referred to both the dye and the sea snail from which the dye was derived. However, this etymological link has been lost in translation.
- Orange is difficult to categorize as abstract or descriptive because both its uses, as a color term and as a word for an object, are very common and it is difficult to distinguish which of the two is primary. In English, the use of the word 'orange' for a fruit predates its use as a color term. The word comes from French orenge, which derives via Arabic نارنج (nāranj) and Sanskrit नारङ्ग (nāraṅga) from a Dravidian language such as Tamil or Tulu. The derived form orangish as a color is attested from the late 19th century by reference to the fruit.

== Struggle in linguistics ==
Research on color terms is often conducted without reference to common uses of the term or its significance within the context of its original language. In John A. Lucy's article The linguistics of 'colour' he identifies two key categories. One of these is "characteristic referential range", or the use of a color term to identify or differentiate a referent over a wide context.

== Philosophy ==
Color objectivism holds that colors are objective, mind-independent properties of material objects or light sources and that color terms refer to objective reality. Two main forms are color primitivism, which sees colors as simple, irreducible qualities either realist or eliminativist, and color physicalism, which views colors as objective properties that require empirical investigation to understand. Color irrealism, eliminativism or fictionalism denies that material objects and light sources actually possess colors, though eliminativists may describe colors as dispositions or attributes of sensations, as seen in the work of Descartes, Newton, and others. Color dispositionalism sees colors as dispositional properties, existing as powers to cause color experiences in perceivers using the right conditions. Averill's radical relationism argues that colors are relational properties. He suggests that the color term "yellow", for example, is a relational term tied to both populations of normal observers and optimal viewing conditions in specific environments.

For Wittgenstein, in his work Remarks on Colour, any puzzles about color and color terms can only be resolved through attention to the language games involved. He stated that our description of colors are neither fully empirical nor a priori. Statements such as "there cannot be a reddish green" are taken as a part of a logical structure akin to geometry, insisting that color-related terms and propositions are rooted in our language practices.

Frank Jackson's knowledge argument against physicalism involves a famous thought experiment about Mary, a scientist knowing everything about the physical aspects of color, including physics and terms, but has lived her whole life in a black-and-white room. When Mary leaves the room and experiences color for the first time, she learns what it feels like to see color, i.e., acquires certain qualia while using the color term "red", suggesting subjective aspects of color experience.

The inverted spectrum argument states that two people could experience different subjective experiences while seeing the same color even when using the same color term "red". For example, one person might see red as what the other experiences as green, even though they both use the color term "red".

Hardin addresses the everyday color terms like "red", "yellow", "green", and "blue", as essential reference points in the study of color. He explores what elements of color are fundamental versus accidental, emphasizing his focus on a core set of colors, including white, black, and gray, while acknowledging a special place for brown in color perception. Peacock explores the relationship between how we conceptualize colors and how we experience them, examining whether color concepts, shaped by language and cognition, align with our subjective experience of color perception.

For Foster, color constancy refers to the phenomenon where the perceived color of a surface remains stable despite changes in lighting conditions, such as intensity or spectral composition. Txapartegi analyzed how the ancient Greeks understood and categorized color through the concepts of hue, brightness, and saturation, using color terms from classical Greek texts.

Šekrst and Karlić introduced cognitive convenience, referring to naming of objects of a certain color, for which their hue is not as important as their brightness. For example, in various languages, grapes are described using color terms "white" and "black" even though their real hue is usually a certain shade of green or purple. Hansen and Chemla explore whether color adjectives, like "red" or "green", function as relative or absolute adjectives, using experimental methods instead of informal judgments. Their findings reveal interpersonal variation in how people apply color adjectives, challenging existing theories and highlighting the complexity of scalar adjectives and context sensitivity.

Decock analyzes conceptual change and engineering in the context of color concepts, arguing that in the case of conceptual change of color concepts varying degrees of optimization, design and control are possible. Krempel investigates whether differences in color terminology across languages lead to differences in color experience, questioning whether language can penetrate and affect perception. She argues that empirical studies do not conclusively support the idea of linguistic penetrability in color experience, even if differences exist between speakers of different languages.

== Standardized systems ==
In contrast with the color terms of natural language, systematized color terms also exist. Some examples of color-naming systems are CNS and ISCC–NBS lexicon of color terms. The disadvantage of these systems, however, is that they specify only specific color samples, so while it is possible to, by interpolating, convert any color to or from one of these systems, a lookup table is required. In other words, no simple invertible equation can convert between CIE XYZ and one of these systems.

Philatelists traditionally use names to identify postage stamp colors. While the names are largely standardized within each country, there is no broader agreement, and so for instance the US-published Scott catalogue will use different names than the British Stanley Gibbons catalogue.

On modern computer systems a standard set of basic color terms is now used across the web color names (SVG 1.0/CSS3), HTML color names, X11 color names and the .NET Framework color names, with only a few minor differences.

The Crayola company is famous for its many crayon colors, often creatively named.

Heraldry has standardized names for 'tinctures', subdivided into 'colors', 'metals', and 'furs'.

== See also ==
- Lists of colors
- Color wheel
- Lazarus Geiger
- How the Himba see green and blue
- Philosophy of color
- Linguistic relativity and the color naming debate
