= Blue–green distinction in language =

The notion of "green" in modern European languages corresponds to light wavelengths of about 520–570 nm, but many historical and non-European languages make other choices, e.g. using a term for the range of ca. 450–530 nm ("blue/green") and another for ca. 530–590 nm ("green/yellow").

In many languages, the colors described in English as "blue" and "green" are colexified, i.e., expressed using a single umbrella term. To render this ambiguous notion in English, linguists use the blend word grue, from green and blue, a term coined by the philosopher Nelson Goodman—with an unrelated meaning—in his 1955 Fact, Fiction, and Forecast to illustrate his "new riddle of induction".

The exact definition of "blue" and "green" may be complicated by the speakers not primarily distinguishing the hue, but using terms that describe other color components such as saturation and luminosity, or other properties of the object being described. For example, "blue" and "green" might be distinguished, but a single term might be used for both if the color is dark. Furthermore, green might be associated with yellow, and blue with either black or gray.

According to Brent Berlin and Paul Kay's 1969 study Basic Color Terms: Their Universality and Evolution, distinct terms for brown, purple, pink, orange, and gray will not emerge in a language until the language has made a distinction between green and blue. In their account of the development of color terms the first terms to emerge are those for white/black (or light/dark), red/blue and green/yellow.

== Afro-Asiatic ==
=== Amazigh ===
The word for blue in the Amazigh (Berber) language is azerwal. In some dialects of Amazigh, like Shilha or Kabyle, the word azegzaw is used for both green and blue.

=== Arabic ===
The color of the sky is sometimes referred to as "the green" in some dialects of Classical Arabic poetry, in which it is al-khaḍrā' (الخضراء). In Arabic the word for blue is azraq (أزرق). The Arabic word for green is akhḍar (أخضر).

In Moroccan Arabic, the word for light blue is šíbi, whereas zraq (زرق) stands for blue and khḍar (خضر) for green. The word zrag (زرڭ) is used to describe the color of a suffocated person, and is also used pejoratively as a synonym to "dumb, stupid".

=== Egyptian ===
The ancient Egyptian word wadjet covered the range of blue, blue-green, and green. It was the name of a goddess, the patroness of Lower Egypt, represented as a cobra called Wadjet, "the green one", or as the Eye of Horus, also called by the same name. At the same time, wedjet was the word used for Egyptian blue in faience ceramics.

=== Hebrew ===
In Hebrew, the word כחול (pronounced [kaˈχol]) means blue, while ירוק ([jaˈʁok]) means green and has the same root, י־ר־ק (j-r-q), as the word for "vegetables" (ירקות, [jeʁaˈkot]). However, in classical Hebrew, ירוק can mean both green and yellow, giving rise to such expressions as ירוק כרישה 'leek green' (Tiberian Hebrew [jɔːˈroːq kəriː'ʃɔː]) to specify green to the exclusion of yellow. Like Russian and Italian, Hebrew has a separate name for light blue (תכלת, tekhelet)—the color of the sky and of tzitzit on the tallit, a ritual garment. This color has special symbolic significance in both Judaism and Jewish culture.

== American languages ==
=== Chahta ===
The Choctaw language has two words, okchʋko and okchʋmali, which have different meanings depending on the source. In 1852 okchakko was translated variously as 'pale blue' or 'pale green', okchakko chohmi 'somewhat okchakko' is given as swarthy, and okchamali is defined as 'deep blue', 'gray', 'green', or 'sky blue'. In 1880, okchakko and okchʋmali are both given as blue, and green is not specifically listed as a color. In an 1892 dictionary, okchamali is deep blue or green, okchakko is pale blue or bright green, and a third word kili̱koba is 'bright green' (resembling a kili̱kki, a species of parrot). By 1915, the authoritative Byington dictionary gives okchako as blue and okchamali as green, blue, gray, verdant. A coursebook from 2001 differentiates based on brightness, giving okchʋko as 'bright blue/green' and okchʋmali as 'pale or dull blue/green'. Modern usage in the Choctaw Nation of Oklahoma language school is to use okchʋko for 'blue' and okchʋmali for 'green', with no distinction for brightness.

=== Kanienʼkéha ===
The language of the Kanien'kehá:ka Nation at Akwesasne is at Stage VII on the Berlin–Kay Scale, and possesses distinct terms for a broad range of spectral and nonspectral colors such as oruía 'blue', óhute 'green', kahúji 'black', karákA 'white', and atakArókwa 'gray'. According to one researcher, the Kanien'kehá:ka term for purple is arihwawakunéha, which translates to 'bishop['s color]', a recent, post-Christianization coinage. The way in which purple was categorized and referenced prior to the addition of the latter term is not clear.

=== Lakota ===
In the Lakota language, the word tȟó is used for both blue and green, though the word tȟózi (a mixture of the words tȟó 'blue (green)', and zí 'yellow') has become common (zítȟo can also be used). This is in line with common practice of using zíša/šázi for orange (šá meaning 'red'), and šátȟo/tȟóša for 'purple/violet'.

=== Mapudungun ===
Mapudungun, spoken by indigenous peoples of Chile and Argentina, distinguishes between kurü 'black', kallfü 'blue' and karü 'green, raw, immature'. The word payne was formerly used to refer to a sky blue, and also refers to the bluish color of stones.

=== Mayan ===
Single words for blue/green are also found in Mayan languages; for example, in the Yucatec Maya language, yax is 'blue/green'.

=== Tupian ===
Tupian languages did not originally differ between the two colors, though they may now as a result of interference of Spanish (in the case of Guaraní) or Portuguese (in the case of Nheengatu). The Tupi word oby /ɔˈβɨ/ meant both, as does the Guaraní hovy /hɔʋɨ/. In modern Tupi (Nheengatu) the word suikiri can be used for green and iakira/akira for blue. However, iakira/akira also means immature, as in pakua akira 'green banana/immature banana', and suikiri can also mean blue. In modern Guarani, the word hovy is used for blue and hovy'û (which literally means "dark green/blue") is used for green. The word aky, which is cognate with Nheengatu akira, also means 'green/immature'.

== Austronesian languages ==
=== Filipino (Tagalog) ===
Speakers of Tagalog most commonly use the Spanish loanwords for blue and green—asul (from Spanish azul) and berde (from Spanish verde), respectively. Although these words are much more common in spoken use, Tagalog has native terms: bugháw for blue and lunti(án) for green, which are seen as archaic and more flowery. These are mostly confined to formal and academic writings, alongside artistic fields such literature, music, and poetry; the 1960s official Filipino text of the national anthem uses bugháw to translate the original Spanish poem’s azul.

In Cebuano, another major Philippine language, the native words for "blue" and "green" end in the same syllable: pughaw and lunhaw, respectively. Pughaw means sky blue, while lunhaw is fresh leaf green (i.e., neither brownish nor yellowish).

Humour and jokes of a sexual or derogatory nature that would otherwise be described as "blue" in English (e.g., "blue comedy", "blue joke") are called "green" in Philippine English. This is a calque of the Hispanic term chiste verde.

=== Javanese ===
Modern Javanese has distinct words for blue biru and green ijo. These words are derived from Old Javanese birū and hijo. However, in Old Javanese birū could mean pale blue, grayish blue, greenish blue, or even turquoise, while hijo which means green, could also mean the blue-green color of clear water. This concept of birū as 'grue' can also be seen in the neighboring language of Madurese, where bhiru means both 'blue' and 'green'. In contemporary use, the word 'green' can be distinguished from bhiru by using the term bhiru dâun 'leaf grue'. Biru and ijo in Modern Javanese are cognates of Malay/Indonesian biru and hijau which both have the same meaning.

=== Māori ===
Māori spoken before contact with Europeans did not distinguish between blue and green, using the word namu (e.g. in pounamu) for both, while words describing greenery in vegetation (e.g. ota, mata) or birds (kākāriki) were dominant in 19th century dictionaries. Descriptions of the new Anglocentric "blue" was developed in association with the sky (rangi; e.g. kikorangi and kahurangi), while darker hues are perceived closer to black like pako (variant of pango) and uriuri.

== Dravidian ==
=== Kannada ===
The Kannada language distinguishes between blue (neeli ನೀಲಿ), green (hasiru ಹಸಿರು) and yellow (haladi ಹಳದಿ). The prefix kadu- (ಕಡು-) would indicate darker colors while the prefix tili- (ತಿಳಿ-) would indicate light colors. Thus kaduneeli (ಕಡುನೀಲಿ) would mean dark/deep blue, while tilineeli (ತಿಳಿನೀಲಿ) would mean light blue.

=== Tamil ===
The Tamil language distinguishes between the colors பச்சை paccai 'green', நீலம் nīlam 'blue', and கருப்பு karuppu 'black'. The prefix karu- would indicate dark colors while the prefix iḷam- would indicate light colors. Thus, கரும்பச்சை karumpaccai would be dark green while இளம்பச்சை ilampaccai would be light green.

=== Telugu ===
The Telugu language uses a single word, పచ్చ pacca, for green and yellow. To differentiate between the two shades, another word is prefixed in some cases. For example, green will be called ఆకుపచ్చ ākupacca 'leaf-pacca' and yellow పసుపుపచ్చ pasupupacca 'turmeric-pacca'.

=== Malayalam ===
In Malayalam, there are distinct words for blue (nīla നീല), green (pacca പച്ച) and yellow (mañña മഞ്ഞ).

== East Asian languages ==
=== Chinese ===
The modern Standard Chinese language has the blue–green distinction (藍 lán for blue and 綠 lǜ for green); however, another word that predates the modern vernacular, qīng (青), is also used in many contexts. The character depicts the budding of a young plant and it could be understood as "verdant", but the word is used to describe colors ranging from light and yellowish green through deep blue all the way to black, as in xuánqīng (玄青). For example, the flag of the Republic of China is referred to as qīng tiān, bái rì, mǎn dì hóng (青天，白日，滿地紅, 'A Blue Sky, White Sun, and Wholly Red Earth') whereas qīngcài (青菜) is the Chinese word for "green vegetable", referring to bok choy, and the opposing sides of the game liubo were known as qīng and white in antiquity despite using black and white pieces. Qīng was the traditional designation of both blue and green for much of the history of the Chinese language, while lán originally referred to the dye of the indigo plant. However, lǜ as a particular 'shade' of qīng applied to cloth and clothing has been attested since the Book of Odes (1000–600 BC), as in the title of Ode 27 (《邶風·綠衣》, "Green Upper Garment") in the Airs of Bei section. After the discarding of Classical Chinese in favor of modern vernacular Chinese, the modern terms for blue and green are now more commonly used than qīng as standalone color terms, although qīng is still part of many common noun phrases. The two forms can also be encountered combined as 青藍 and 青綠, with qīng being used as an intensifier. In modern scientific contexts, qīng refers to cyan as a narrow range of color in between blue and green, and the modern color names are used when referring to other shades of blue or of green.

=== Japanese ===
Traditional colors of Japan
#5B8930	萌黄 Moegi 'budding yellow-green', traditionally regarded as a shade of yellow
#6B9362	若竹色 Wakatake-iro 'young bamboo green', traditionally regarded as a shade of blue

In the Japanese language the various shades of green were traditionally regarded as shades of blue or, to a lesser extent, yellow. The color-words 青 (ao; n.) or 青い (aoi; adj.)—the same kanji character as the Chinese qīng—can refer to either blue or most shades of green. In Japan, ao is still the main noun used to describe the color of vegetation and plant material (such as edible vegetables), as well as the lamp indicating "go" on traffic lights. In addition, some colors traditionally regarded in Japan as shades of yellow include moegi (萌黄) i.e. chartreuse (elsewhere considered a point on the color spectrum between green and yellow).

While Japanese words for specific shades of green have existed for millennia, the word now most often used only for green, midori (緑), came into use only in the Heian period (circa 9th to 12th centuries) and, for a long time thereafter, midori was considered a shade of ao. Educational materials distinguishing between green and blue came into use only after World War II. Other objects—e.g. a green car or green clothing—are generally called midori. Since the late 20th century, Japanese people have also sometimes used the color-word gurīn (グリーン), a loanword derived from the English word "green".

=== Korean ===
The native Korean word 푸르다 (pureuda) can refer to either blue or green depending on the situation. It is used for blue as in 푸른 하늘 (pureun haneul 'blue sky'), or for green as in 푸른 숲 (pureun sup 'green forest'), 푸른 열매 (pureun yeolmae 'green fruit'). 푸른 (pureun) is a noun-modifying form. Another word 파랗다 (parata) explicitly refers to blue, but it exceptionally means green in 파란 불 (paran bul 'green light'). Sino-Korean expressions 초록/草綠 (chorok adj./n.) or 녹/綠 (noksaek n.) refers to green, but it is a relatively recent usage.

=== Mongolian ===
Modern Mongolian makes a distinction between green (ногоон, nogoon) and blue, which has separate categories for light blue (цэнхэр, tsenher) and dark blue (хөх, höh). Historically, Mongolian included greens such as fresh grass in the höh category, and nogoon became a more common term in the modern era.

=== Tibetan ===
In Tibetan, སྔོན་པོ། (Wylie sngon po) is the term traditionally given for the color of the sky and of grass. This term also falls into the general pattern of naming colors by appending the suffix po, as in mar po 'red', ser po 'yellow', nag po 'black', and dkar po 'white'. Conspicuously, the term for 'green' is ljang khu, likely related to ljang bu, and defined as—"the grue (sngon po) sprout of wheat or barley".

=== Vietnamese ===
Vietnamese used to colexify green and blue with the word xanh. This is a colloquial rendering of thanh 靑, as with Chinese and Japanese. In modern usage, blue and green are dislexified. Shades of blue are specifically described as xanh da trời 'blue skin of sky', or xanh dương, xanh nước biển, 'blue of ocean'. Green is described as xanh lá cây 'green leaves'.

Vietnamese occasionally employs the terms xanh lam 'blue' and xanh lục 'green' in which the second syllables is derived from the Chinese: 藍 and 綠 respectively, sometimes skipping the syllable xanh, for blue and green, respectively, in formal or scientific speech. Xanh can also be used singularly for any color that is the shade in between blue and green inclusively.

== Indo-European ==
=== Albanian ===
Albanian has two major words for "blue": kaltër refers to a light blue, such as that of the sky, but it is derived from Vulgar Latin calthinus, itself derived from caltha, a loan from Ancient Greek that meant "marigold" a small and in fact yellow flower. The other word, blu, refers to a darker shade of blue, and like many similar words across many European languages, derives ultimately from Germanic (see also: Italian blu). There is a separate word for green, gjelbër, which derives from the Latin galbinus, which originally meant "yellow" (cf. German gelb); the original Latin word for green on the other hand, viridis is the source of the Albanian word for "yellow", verdhë. Albanian also has a borrowed word for green, jeshil, from Turkish yeşil; it tends to be used for non-natural greens (such as traffic signals) in contrast to gjelbër.

=== Baltic ===
Latvian has separate words for green zaļš and blue zils. Both zils and zaļš stem from the same Proto-Indo-European word for yellow (*ghel). Several other words in Latvian have been derived from these colors, namely grass is called zāle (from zaļš), while the name for iris is zīlīte (from zils).

The now archaic word mēļš was used to describe both dark blue and black (probably indicating that previously zils was used only for lighter shades of blue). For instance, blueberries are called mellenes.

In Latvian, black is melns (in some local dialects mells).

In Lithuanian, žalias is green, mėlynas is blue, and žilas is gray (hair) or grizzled.

=== Slavic ===
Bulgarian, a South Slavic language, makes a clear distinction between blue (синьо, sinyo), green (зелено, zeleno), and black (черно, cherno).

In the Polish language, blue (niebieski, from niebo 'sky') and green (zielony) are treated as separate colors. The word for sky blue or azure—błękitny—might be considered either a basic color or a shade of blue by different speakers. Similarly dark blue or navy blue (granatowy—deriving from the name of pomegranate (granat), some cultivars of which are dark purplish blue in color) can be considered by some speakers as a separate basic color. Black (czarny) is completely distinguished from blue. As in English, Polish distinguishes pink (różowy) from red (czerwony).

The word siwy means blue-gray in Polish (literally: "color of gray hair"). The word siny refers to violet-blue and is used to describe the color of bruises (siniaki), hematoma, and the blue skin discoloration that can result from moderate hypothermia.

Russian has several words referring to the range of colors denoted by the English term "blue". It traditionally treats light blue (голубой, goluboy) as a separate color independent from plain or dark blue (синий, siniy), with all seven "basic" colors of the spectrum (red–orange–yellow–green–голубой/goluboy (sky blue, light azure, but may or may not be equal to cyan)–синий/siniy ("true" deep blue, like synthetic ultramarine)–violet) while in English the light blues like azure and cyan are considered mere shades of "blue" and not different colors. The Russian word for "green" is зелёный zelyonyy.

Similarly, English language descriptions of rainbows have often distinguished between blue or turquoise and indigo, the latter of which is often described as dark blue or ultramarine.

The Serbo-Croatian color system makes a distinction between blue, green and black:

- Blue: plava (indicates any blue) and modra; in the eastern speaking areas modra indicates dark blue, in some of the western areas it may indicate any blue
  - Navy blue: teget (mainly in the eastern speaking areas)
  - Ash blue: sinje (especially in Dalmatia to describe sea in stormy weather: sinje more)
- Green: zelena
- Black: crna

Modra may also mean dark blue and dark purple that are used to describe colours of a bruise, modrica. Native speakers cannot pinpoint a color on the spectrum which would correspond to modra.

Sinje, cognate to Bulgarian синьо sinyo and Russian синий siniy, is archaic; the term denotes blue-gray, usually used to describe dark seas.

Turquoise is usually described as tirkizna, and similarly, azure will use a loan word azurna. There is no specific word for cyan. Blond hair is called plava 'blue', reflecting likely the archaic use of plav for any bright white/blue colors (like the sky).

Mrko 'dusky' can refer either dark brown, less often dark gray, or even black. It is etymologically derived from the word for 'darkness' (mrak), but is distinct from 'dark' (tamna). For instance, it is used to describe the brown bear (mrki medved/medvjed). Smeđe and kestenjasto refer to brown, crveno means red, ružičasto is for pink and narančasto designates orange.

Shades are defined with a prefix (e.g., tamno- for dark, or svetlo-/svijetlo- for light), for example, dark blue is tamnoplavo.

The Slovene language distinguishes among blue, green and black

- Blue: moder (officially) or plav (vernacular) is used for any blue. Sometimes sinj (adj. sinje) is also used to describe azure. The word akvamarin is sometimes used for navy-blue.
- Green: zelen is related to the word zel, which is derived from Proto-Slavic word *зель for "herb" – which in turn is believed to be derived from Proto-Indo-European word for "to shine", which also described light shades of colors (gold, yellow and green).
- Black: Črn

Although the blue and green color are not strictly defined, so Slovene speakers cannot point to a certain shade of blue or green, but rather the whole spectrum of blue and green shades, there is a distinction between light and dark hues of these colors, which is described with prefixes svetlo- (light) and temno- (dark).

Transient hues between blue and green are mostly described as zeleno moder or modro zelen, sometimes as turkizen (turquoise). Transient hues between green and yellow (rumena) are described as rumeno zelen or zeleno rumen.

=== Celtic ===
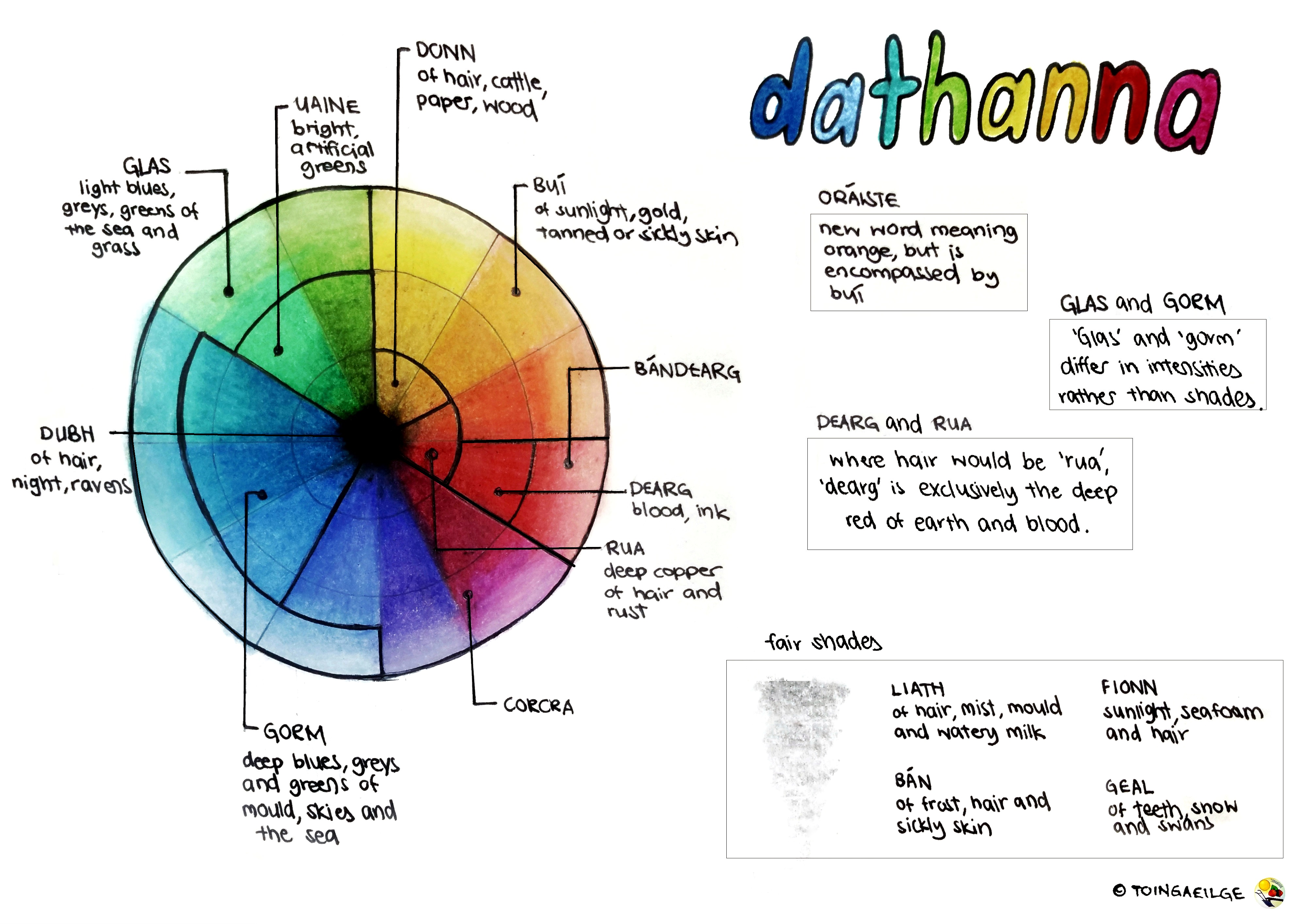
Colour wheel with Irish Gaelic colour terms, explaining that glas ("pale blue/grey/green") and gorm ("deep blue/grey/green") are distinguished based on intensity (luminosity) rather than hue. Similarly, buí refers not only to "yellow" and "gold", but pale browns as "buff beige" and "ochre", while dunn is for darker browns. Rua refers to red of hair (fox, robin), whereas dearg refers to red of blood and bándearg is "pale red". Then, Bán, fionn, geal, and liath all refer to varying degrees of brightness or "fairness" — without mapping clearly only the English "white" — against dubh for "dark" or "black".

The Welsh, Cornish, and Breton word glas is usually translated as 'blue'; however, it can also refer, variously, to the color of the sea, of grass, or of silver (cf. Ancient Greek γλαυκός). The word gwyrdd (a borrowing from Latin viridis) is the standard translation for 'green'. In traditional Welsh (and related languages), glas could refer to certain shades of green and gray as well as blue, and llwyd could refer to various shades of gray and brown. Perhaps under the influence of English, Modern Welsh is trending toward the 11-color Western scheme, restricting glas to 'blue' and using gwyrdd for 'green', llwyd for 'gray' and brown for 'brown', respectively. However, the more traditional usage is still heard today in the Welsh word for 'grass' (glaswellt or gwelltglas), and in fossilized expressions such as caseg las 'gray mare', tir glas 'green land', papur llwyd 'brown paper' and even red for 'brown' in siwgwr coch 'brown sugar'.

In Modern Irish and Scottish Gaelic, the word for 'blue' is gorm (whence the name Cairngorm mountains derives) – a borrowing from the now obsolete Early Welsh word gwrm 'dark blue, dusky'. A relic of the original meaning 'dusky, dark brown' survives in the Irish term daoine gorma 'Black people'.

In Old and Middle Irish, like in Welsh, glas was a blanket term for colors ranging from green to blue to various shades of gray (e.g., the glas of a sword, the glas of stone). In Modern Irish, it has come to mean both various shades of green, with specific reference to plant hues, and gray (like the sea), respectively; shades of green not related to plants would be referred to in Modern Irish as uaine or uaithne, while liath is gray proper (like a stone).

Scottish Gaelic uses the term uaine for 'green'. However, the dividing line between it and gorm differs somewhat from the English "green" and "blue", with uaine signifying a light green or yellow-green, and gorm extending from dark blue (what in English might be navy blue) to include the dark green or blue-green of vegetation. Grass, for instance, is gorm, rather than uaine. In addition, liath covers a range from light blue to light gray. However, the term for a green apple, such as a Granny Smith, would be ubhal glas.

The boundary between colors varies much more than the "focal point": e.g. an island known in Breton as Enez c'hlas 'the blue island' is l'Île Verte 'the green island' in French, in both cases referring to the grayish-green color of its bushes, even though both languages distinguish green from blue.

=== Romance ===
The Romance terms for "green" (Catalan verd, French vert, Galician, Italian, Portuguese, Romanian and Spanish verde) are all from Latin viridis. The terms for "blue", on the other hand, vary: Catalan blau, Occitan blau, French bleu and Italian blu come from a Germanic root, the Spanish, Galician and Portuguese azul is likely to come from Arabic, whereas the Romanian albastru is of Latin origin, originating from alabaster. French bleu was in turn loaned into many other languages, including English. Latin itself did not have a word covering all shades of blue, which may help explain these borrowings. It did, however, recognise caeruleus (dark blue, sometimes greenish), and lividus (grayish blue, like lead).

French, as most Romance languages, makes roughly the same distinctions as English and has a specific term for each of blue ("bleu"), green ("vert") and gray ("gris"). For all three, different shades can be indicated with different (compound) terms, none of them being considered as basic color terms: "bleu clair" (light blue), "bleu ciel" (sky blue), "bleu marine" (Navy blue), "bleu roi" (royal blue); "vert clair" (light green), "vert pomme" (literally: apple green); "gris anthracite" (deep gray), "gris souris" (literally: "mouse gray"). French also uses "azur" for the lighter shade of blue of the sunny sky, that was in turn loaned to English as "azure".

Catalan distinguishes blue (blau) from green (verd) and gray (gris). Other basic or common colors by its own right are porpra "purple", groc "yellow", carbassa or taronja "orange", vermell "red", rosa "pink", marró "brown", gris "gray", negre "black" and blanc "white". For all these colors except black and white it is possible to indicate different shades using clar "light" and fosc "dark"; for blue, though, it generally is blau cel "sky blue" and blau marí "sea blue". Other words and compounds are common to indicate more elaborated shades (verd llimona "lemon green", rosa pàl·lid "pale pink", lila "lilac", granat "carmine", ocre "ocher", verd oliva "olive green", etc.). Catalan actually distinguishes two reds with different and common words: while vermell refers to the color of blood, roig is a red tending towards yellow or the color of clay.

Italian distinguishes blue (blu), green (verde) and gray (grigio). There are also common words for light blue (e.g. the color of the cloudless sky): azzurro and celeste, and other for darker shades, e.g. indaco, indigo. Azzurro, the equivalent of the English azure, is usually considered a separate basic color rather than a shade of blu (similar to the distinction in English between red and pink). Some sources even go to the point of defining blu as a darker shade of azzurro. Celeste literally means '(the color) of the sky' and can be used as synonym of azzurro, although it will more often be considered a less saturated hue. acquamarina (aquamarine) literally "sea water", indicates an even lighter, almost transparent, shade of blue. To indicate a mix of green and blue, Italians might say verde acqua, literally water green. The term glauco, not common in standard Italian and perceived as a literary term, is used in scientific contexts (esp. botany) to indicate a mix of blue, green and gray. Other similar terms are ceruleo and turchese (turquoise/teal); they are more saturated hues (especially turchese) and differ in context of use: the first is a literary or bureaucratic term (used for example to indicate light green eyes in identity cards); the second is more common in any informal speech, along with the variant turchino (for instance, the fairy of The Adventures of Pinocchio is called fata turchina).

In Portuguese, the word "azul" means blue and the word "verde" means green. Furthermore, "azul-claro" means light-blue, and "azul-escuro" means dark-blue. More distinctions can be made between several hues of blue. For instance, "azul-celeste" means sky blue, "azul-marinho" means navy-blue and "azul-turquesa" means turquoise-blue. One can also make the distinction between "verde-claro" and "verde-escuro", meaning light and dark-green respectively, and more distinctions between several qualities of green: for instance, "verde-oliva" means olive-green and "verde-esmeralda" means emerald-green. Cyan is usually called "azul-celeste" (sky blue) and "verde-água", meaning water green.

Romanian clearly distinguishes between the colors green (verde) and blue (albastru). It also uses separate words for different hues of the same color, e.g. light blue (bleu), blue (albastru), dark-blue (bleu-marin or bleomarin), along with a word for turquoise (turcoaz) and azure (azur or azuriu).

Similarly to French, Romanian, Italian and Portuguese, Spanish distinguishes blue (azul) and green (verde) and has an additional term for the tone of blue visible in the sky, namely "celeste", which is nonetheless considered a shade of blue.

=== Germanic ===
In Old Norse, the word blár 'blue' (from proto-Germanic *blēwaz) was also used to describe black (and the common word for people of African descent was thus blámenn 'blue/black men'). In Swedish, blå, the modern word for blue, was used this way until the early 20th century, and it still is to a limited extent in modern Faroese.

German and Dutch distinguish blue (respectively blau and blauw) and green (grün and groen), very similarly to English. There are (compound) terms for light blue (hellblau and lichtblauw) and darker shades of blue (dunkelblau and donkerblauw). In addition, adjective forms of most traditional color names are inflected to match the corresponding noun's case and gender.

=== Greek ===
The words for "blue" and "green" completely changed in the transition from Ancient Greek to Modern Greek.

Ancient Greek had γλαυκός (glaukós) "clear light blue" contrasting with χλωρός (khlōrós) "bright green"; for darker shades of both colors, γλαυκός and χλωρός were replaced by κυανός (kuanós), meaning either a "dark blue or green". The words had more than one modern meaning: in addition to "clear light blue", γλαυκός also meant "turquoise" and "teal-green" – it was the typical description of the color of the goddess Athena's eyes, portrayed as either gray or light blue. As well as "bright green", χλωρός was also used for "acid yellow" (compare "chlorophyll"). Furthermore, κυανός not only meant "turquoise" and "teal-green", but could mean either a "dark blue" or "dark green" or just "blue" (adopted into English as "cyan" for light sky-blue).

Those terms changed in Byzantine Greek as seen from the insignia colors of two of Constantinople's rival popular factions: Πράσινοι (Prasinoi, "the Greens") and Bένετοι (Venetoi, "the Blues"). It is not known if those groups' names influenced the word change or if they were named using the new color terms, but whichever way it went, πράσινος (prásinos) is a Modern Greek word for "green".

The ancient term for blue (γλαυκός) has become an archaic term in Modern Greek, replaced by γαλάζιος (galázios) or θαλασσής (thalassís, "sea colored") for light blue / sea blue, and the recent indeclinable loan-word μπλε (ble, from French bleu; μπ = b) is used for blue.

In the Modern Greek language, there are names for light and dark blues and greens in addition to those discussed above:

Modern Greek	Transliteration	English
τυρκουάζ	tyrkouáz	turquoise
κυανός	kyanós	azure (old κυανός; see above)
λαχανί	lachaní ("cabbage colored")	lime green
λαδής	ladís	olive green
χακί	chakí	dark khaki
κυπαρισσί	kyparissí ("cypress colored")	brownish green

As a rule, the first two words of the list are accepted as shades of blue, and the rest as shades of green. Also βιολέ (violé) / βιολετί (violetí) for violet blue (which is, however, usually considered as a shade of purple, rather than blue).

=== Iranian ===
Ossetian has only one word for blue, light blue and green—цъæх tsəh, which also means "gray" and "glaucous"—but it also has a separate word for green, кæрдæгхуыз kərdəghuɨz, literally "grassy" (from кæрдæг 'grass'). The latter derives from кæрдын kərdɨn 'to mow' (like in German Heu (hau) < hauen 'to mow').

Ossetian also has separate words for the following colors:

- light blue: æрвхуыз ərvhuɨz from æрвон 'sky'
- glaucous: бæлонхуыз bəlonhuɨz from бæлон 'pigeon' (a calque from Russian, cf. голубой 'light blue' < голубь 'pigeon'); also фæздæгхуыз fəzdəghuɨz from fazdag 'smoke', from Old Persian *pazdaka-, cognate of Latin pedis 'louse'
- blue: копрадзхуыз kopradzhuɨz, from копрадз kopradz - bluing for laundering, transliteration of Russian купорос kuporos 'vitriol' from Latin cuprum 'copper'
- gray: фæныкхуыз fənykhuɨz, from фæнык fənyk 'ashes', originating from Persian *pa(s)nu-ka, or Russian cognate песок pesok 'sand'

Pashto uses the word shīn to denote blue as well as green. Shinkay, a word derived from shīn, means 'greenery' but shīn āsmān means 'blue sky'. One way to disambiguate is to ask "Shīn like the sky? Or shīn like plants?" (Blue and green are however distinguished using different words in the eastern parts of Afghanistan and Pakistan, due to contact with other languages.)

Kurdish has two words for 'blue', namely شین şîn and کەوی kewî. Another word, şinahî, means 'green', e.g. for plants and grass.

Persian words for blue include آبی ābi (literally the color of water, from āb 'water'), for blue generally; نیلی nili (from nil, 'indigo dye'), for deeper shades of blue such as the color of rain clouds; فیروزه fayruzeh 'turquoise stone', used to describe the color of blue eyes; لاجوردی lājvardi or لاژوردی lāzhvardi 'lapis lazuli color', source of the words lazuli and azure; نیلوفری nilufari 'water lily color'; and کبود kabud, an old literary word for 'blue'.

The Persian word for green is سبز sabz. As in Sudan, dark-skinned people may be described as "green".

The color of the sky is variously described in Persian poetry using the words sabz, nil, fayruzeh, lājvardi, or nilufari— literally "green", "indigo", "turquoise", "azure" or "the color of water lilies". For example, sabz-ākhor "green stable", sabz-āshyāneh "green ceiling", sabz-ayvān "green balcony", and sabz-tā'us "green peacock" are poetic epithets for the sky—in addition to similar compounds using the words for blue, e.g., lājvardi-saqf "lapis lazuli-colored roof" or fayruzeh-tasht "turquoise bowl". Moreover, the words for green of Arabic origin اخضر akhzar and خضرا khazrā are used for epithets of the sky or heaven, such as charkh-e akhzar "green wheel".

=== Indo-Aryan ===
Chinalbashe (an unclassified Indo-Aryan language) & Chambyali (a Western Pahari language) have the same term for blue & green, i.e., Takri: 𑚝𑚯𑚥𑚭 ISO: nīlā.

Other Indo-Aryan languages distinguish blue from green. In Urdu, blue is نیلا nīlā and green is سبز sabz. There are some names of shades of blue as well, like فیروزی ferozī 'turquoise'. In Hindi, blue is नीला nīlā and green is हरा harā. In Marathi, blue is निळा niḽā and green is हिरवा hiravā. In Bengali, blue is নীল nīl and green is সবুজ sabuj.

== Niger-Congo A ==
In Yoruba, there are only three fundamental terms for colors, one of them, the word dúdú, is used for the word black and colors such as blue, green, purple, and grey. In modern times, unique terms for the colors are formed based on descriptive markers or English loan words, àwọ̀ ewé 'color of the leaves' is used for green, while búlùú (from English "blue") or àwọ̀ aró 'color of dye', is used for blue.

== Niger-Congo B (Bantu) ==
=== isiZulu and isiXhosa ===
Zulu and Xhosa use the word -luhlaza for blue/green; the prefix changes according to the class of noun. Speakers of the two mutually intelligible languages can add a descriptive word after the colour term to differentiate between the two colours; for example "(lu)hlaza okwesibhakabhaka" meaning 'like the sky' or (lu)hlaza okwotshani meaning 'like grass'.

=== Kiswahili ===
The Swahili word for blue is buluu, which is derived directly from English and has been in the language for a relatively short time. For other colors, Swahili uses either rangi ya ___ 'the color of ___' or a shortened version, -a ___. For example, green is rangi ya kijani or rangi ya majani 'the color of grass/leaves'. Sky blue is rangi ya samawati 'the color of the sky' from the Arabic word for sky سَمَاء samāʔ (plural: سَمَاوَات samāwāt). These examples can be written as -a kijani, -a majani, -a samwati

=== OtjiHimba ===
The Himba people use a single word for shades of green and blue: buru. They curiously have only three other color names; thus, their limited color perception has aroused interest in anthropologists, who have studied this phenomenon.

=== Setswana ===
Tswana uses the same word tala to refer to both blue and green. One has to deduce from the context and prior knowledge, of what is being talked about, to be able to pinpoint exactly the color in question.

== Northern Caucasus languages ==
In the language Tsakhur, not only are blue and green distinguished, but also turquoise.

== Pama–Nyungan languages ==
=== Eastern Arrernte ===
In Eastern Arrernte, the words atherrke and atherrke-atherrke both can be used to refer to the colour green, including some shades of blue and yellow. Additionally, atherrke can also be used as a noun to refer to grass and other small plants.

== Other European languages ==
=== Basque ===
The Basque language has three native color words derived from ur 'water'. Urdin, is nowadays used in most cases for blue. Ubel originally meant "flash flood" and, with respect to colors, refers to bruises. Begi ubela would be translated into English by "a black and blue eye". But in Basque, unlike English, ubel remains in use after the hit skin has lost its purple color and become pale, why this word is used for both "purple" in particular and "pale hue" in general. Uher originally meant "dirty", "still water", or "rusty"; it is used for gray or sienna tones, and more generally for dark colors. Green is usually expressed with the loan-word berde from Spanish verde/French vert: in Northern dialects, more influenced by French and Gascon, the form ferde also exists. The authenticity of the less common Basque terms for green (h)orlegi and musker is disputed.

=== Uralic ===
Finnish makes a distinction between vihreä 'green' and sininen 'blue'. Turquoise or teal (turkoosi or sinivihreä) is considered to be a separate, intermediate color between green and blue, and musta 'black' is also differentiated from blue.

The name for blue, sininen, is shared with other Finnic languages. Cognates of the root are also found in the Mordvinic languages and it is thus dated even beyond the era of the Proto-Finnic language (c. 2000 years old). It appears similar to a word found in the Slavic languages (Russian синий siniy), but there is no consensus that there would be a relationship (see Proto-Finnic *sini, Proto-Slavic *siňь). The word vihreä (viher-, archaic viheriä, viheriäinen) is related to vehreä 'verdant' and vihanta 'green', and viha 'hate', originally 'poison'. It is not shared with Estonian, in which it is roheline, probably related with the Estonian word rohi 'grass'. However, the form viha does have correspondences in related languages as far as Permic languages, where it means not only "poison" but "bile" or "green or yellow". It has been originally loaned from an Indo-Iranian protolanguage and is related to Latin virus 'poison'. Furthermore, the word musta 'black' is also of Finnic origin.

The differentiation of several colors by hue is at least Finnic (a major subgroup of Uralic) in origin. Before this, only red (punainen) was clearly distinguished by hue, with other colors described in terms of brightness (valkea vs. musta), using non-color adjectives for further specificity. Alternatively, it appears that the distinction between valkea and musta was in fact "clean, shining" vs. "dirty, murky". The original meaning of sini was possibly either "black/dark" or "green". Mauno Koski's theory is that dark colors of high saturation—both blue and green—would be sini, while shades of color with low saturation, such as dark brown or black, would be musta. Although it is theorized that originally vihreä was not a true color name and was used to describe plants only, the occurrence of vihreä or viha as a name of a color in several related languages shows that it was probably polysemic (meaning both "green" and "verdant") already in early Baltic-Finnic. However, whatever the case with these theories, differentiation of blue and green must be at least as old as the Baltic-Finnic languages.

Hungarian makes the distinction between green (zöld) and blue (kék), and also distinguishes black (fekete). Intermediate colors between green and blue are commonly referred to as zöldeskék (literally greenish-blue) or kékeszöld (bluish-green), but names for specific colors in this continuum—like turquoise (türkiz)—also exist. Particular shades of a color can also have separate names, such as azure (azúr).

== Turkic ==
=== Kazakh ===
The Kazakh language, like many Turkic languages, distinguishes between kök for blue and jasyl for green. In Kazakh, many adjectival variations can be found referring to perceived gradations in saturation level of "blue", such as kögildir, kökshil, and kökboz, which respectively denominate the gradual decrease in the intensity, kökboz being often used as a color referent in its own right. Kök is occasionally used to denote green plants (e.g. kök shöp), but such usage is mostly confined to poetic utterances or certain localized dialects.

=== Tuvan ===
Before the standardization and mongolization of the Tuvan language, many centuries ago, Tuvans used the word kök (from the Proto-Turkic kök – "blue/celestial") for both blue and green. To distinguish the color green from blue, they used to name it sug-kök – "water-blue", no matter how strange it may sound. Although note that kök was used for green primarily, they used sug-kök only if they needed to. Thus, blue was kök, and green was kök, sug-kök. However, the dark hues of both colors can be named similarly as kök even nowadays.

Over time, due to the diversity of the country (Tuva being at the border of different major tribes, both Turkic and Mongol), the green color was named differently from one area to another. In some parts, Tuvans used chazhyl ("green" in the majority of the Turkic languages), other parts used the Mongol nogoon, the rest used the traditional kök/sug-kok.

Under the influence of the Mongol Empire and due to the need to standardize the language at the beginning of the 20th century, the word green became nogoon (from the Mongolian "green"). The linguists who were responsible for the standardization had to take into account two factors: the Mongolization of the language, and the lack of the word for green. They decided to use the Mongolian word for green because they wanted to implicate the Mongol legacy in the lexicon.

Hence today, in the standardized Tuvan language, blue and green are named differently, but it led to the following controversies:

- The problem with nogoon is that it is purely symbolic, and not a natural thing.
- The color was named after a foreign non-Turkic word.
- Not choosing the obvious Turkic chazhyl, which was already used in Western parts of Tuva.
- The new naming of the green color was done in the 20th century, which was subjectively recent. Also, the realization of the innovation was performed forcibly, also touching the previous point, by making the people to switch from chazhyl to nogoon.

Nowadays, the "Blue-green distinction" topic is quite forgotten, people are used to the usage of nogoon. In general, Mongolisms in the lexicon of the Tuvan language are not considered unusual.

=== Turkish ===
Turkish treats dark or navy blue (lacivert, from the same Persian root as English "azure" and "lapis lazuli") as a separate color from plain or light blue (mavi). Mavi is derived from the Arabic word مائي māʼī 'like water' (ماء māʼ being the Arabic word for water) and lacivert is derived from Persian لاجورد lājvard 'lapis lazuli', a semiprecious stone with the color of navy blue. In the pre-Islamic religion of the Turks, blue is the color that represented the east, as well as the zodiac sign Aquarius (the Water Bearer). A characteristic tone of blue, turquoise, was much used by the Turks for their traditional decorations and jewelry.

In traditional pre-Islamic Turkic culture, both blue and green were represented by the same name, gök 'sky'. The name is still in use in many rural areas. For instance, in many regions of Turkey, when mold is formed on cheese, the phenomenon is called göğermek 'turning into the color of sky (gök)'.

== See also ==
- Aqua (color)
- Azure (color)
- Basic Color Terms: Their Universality and Evolution
- Blue/Green/Cyan/Teal
- Blue-green
- Color term
- Color of water
- Linguistic relativity and the color naming debate
- List of colors
- Qingniao
- Semantic field for the concept of the range of words
- Spring green
- Traditional colors of Japan
- Variations of blue
- Variations of green

== Sources ==
- Etymological Dictionary of Basque
- Hirayama, Hitomi (1999). "Green... midori? ao?" (PDF). Pera Pera Penguin. 32. Yomiuri Shimbun. Archived from the original (PDF) on June 10, 2006.
