= Langscape =

Sociolinguistics concept

Langscape is a term and concept adapting and amending the word 'landscape' to emphasize worlds of 'languages' that are locally interlinked with the worlds 'landscapes' (see cultural landscapes) where people locally live, forming and speaking words across generations within those landscapes, being words and languages often particular to those landscapes. Some writers have used the term for slightly different meanings. The term is used by some writers in the field of education.

The term and concept first started to be more popularly promoted from June 1996 when an organization incorporated to coordinate partnerships aimed at better valuing, mapping, and conserving interlinked linguistic and biological diversity i.e. Terralingua adopted this term for its members newsletter and magazine Langscape. The term and concept is now also being used by a Language Science Center, the Maryland Language Science Center, for its own Langscape geographical information system mapping language diversity and the accumulated knowledge of over more than 6400 languages worldwide.

Based out of the University of Siegen, Germany, there is a European Language Acquisition and Language Learning network of Researchers for whom "..the nexus between language skills and the formation of social identity, plurilinguality and supranational identity is a key issue for Langscape researchers seeking to reflect languages' true geographical and linguistic diversity and range" (see here)

== See also ==
- Linguistic landscape
