= Biocultural diversity =

Biocultural diversity is defined by Luisa Maffi, co-founder and director of Terralingua, as "the diversity of life in all its manifestations: biological, cultural, and linguistic — which are interrelated (and possibly coevolved) within a complex socio-ecological adaptive system." "The diversity of life is made up not only of the diversity of plants and animal species, habitats and ecosystems found on the planet, but also of the diversity of human cultures and languages." Research has linked biocultural diversity to the resilience of social-ecological systems. Certain geographic areas have been positively correlated with high levels of biocultural diversity, including those of low latitudes, higher rainfalls, higher temperatures, coastlines, and high altitudes. A negative correlation is found with areas of high latitudes, plains, and drier climates. Positive correlations can also be found between biological diversity and linguistic diversity, illustrated in the overlap between the distribution of plant diversity and language diverse zones. Social factors, such as modes of subsistence, have also been found to affect biocultural diversity.

== Measuring biocultural diversity ==
Biocultural diversity can be quantified using QCUs (quantum co-evolution units), and can be monitored through time to quantify biocultural evolution (a form of coevolution). This methodology can be used to study the role that biocultural diversity plays in the resilience of social-ecological systems. It can also be applied on a landscape scale to identify critical cultural habitat for Indigenous peoples.

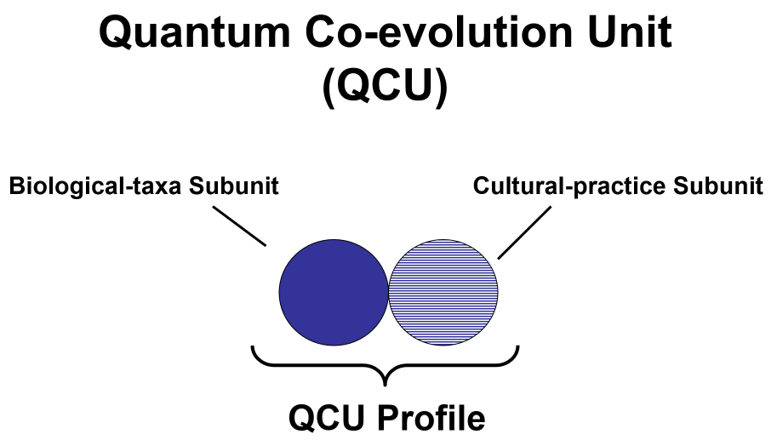
The "quantum coevolution unit" (QCU) was first proposed in 2009 by Kawika B. Winter and Will McClatchey as a unit of measure for coevolution between people and plants, but has applications for quantifying other forms of coevolution.

== Linguistic diversity ==
Cultural traditions are passed down through language, making language an important factor in the existence of biocultural diversity. There has been a decline in the number of languages globally. The Linguistic Diversity Index has recorded that between 1970 and 2005, the number of languages spoken globally has decreased by 20%. This decline has been especially observed in indigenous languages, with a 60% decline in the Americas, 30% in the Pacific, and 20% in Africa. Currently, there are 7,000 languages being spoken in the world. Half the population speaks only 25 of these languages, the top 5 in order being Mandarin, Spanish, English, Hindi, and Bengali. The remaining 6975 languages are divided between the other half of the population. Because languages develop in a given community of speakers as that society adapts to its environment, languages reflect and express the biodiversity of that area. In areas of high biodiversity, language diversity is also higher, suggesting that a greater diversity in culture can be found in these areas. In fact, many of the areas of the world inhabited by smaller, isolated communities are also home to large numbers of endemic plant and animal species. As these people are often considered to be "stewards" of their environments, loss of language diversity means a disappearance of traditional ecological knowledge (TEK), an important factor in the conservation of biodiversity.

== Declaration of Belem ==
Awareness about the balance between biological and cultural diversity has been increasing for a few decades. At the first international congress on ethnobiology in 1988, scientists met with indigenous peoples to discuss ways to better manage the use of natural resources and protect vulnerable communities around the world. They developed the Declaration of Belem, named after the city where the congress was held, which outlined eight steps to ensure conservation efforts would be implemented effectively. (This is not to be confused with the 2023 Belem Declaration by the eight Amazon basin countries which tackles deforestation, see 2023 Amazon Cooperation Treaty Organization Summit)

== Hotspots of biocultural diversity ==
There are three areas which have been identified as hotspots of biocultural diversity: The Amazon Basin, Central Africa, and Indomalaysia/Melanesia. Hot spots of biocultural diversity can be calculated by averaging a country's biological diversity and cultural diversity. Cultural diversity is scored based on "a country's language diversity, religion diversity, and ethnic group diversity". Recent programs in the Eastern Himalayas have also engaged this concept to promote conservation.

== Biocultural conservation ==
In 2000, Ricardo Rozzi coined the term biocultural conservation to emphasize that “1) conservation biology issues involve [ontologically, epistemologically, and ethically] both humans and other living beings, 2) biological and cultural diversity are inextricably integrated, and 3) social welfare and biocultural conservation go together” (p. 10). Then, Rozzi and collaborators proposed participatory approaches to biocultural conservation, identifying ten principles: 1) interinstitutional cooperation, (2) a participatory approach, (3) an interdisciplinary approach, (4) networking and international cooperation, (5) communication through the media, (6) identification of a flagship species, (7) outdoor formal and informal education, (8) economic sustainability and ecotourism, (9) administrative sustainability, and (10) research and conceptual sustainability for conservation. These principles were effective for establishing the Cape Horn Biosphere Reserve, Chile, at the southern end of the Americas, involving multiple actors, disciplines, and scales.

== Biocultural restoration ==
Biocultural restoration endeavors to revive the many connections between cultures and the biodiversity they are founded on. This can be done in a larger effort to restore resilience in social-ecological systems. While some have questioned the conservation value of biocultural restoration, recent research has shown that such approaches can be in alignment with core conservation goals. The Hawaiian renaissance in Hawaii is held up as a global model for biocultural restoration within the scholarly literature on the topic.

== See also ==
- Biocultural anthropology
- Biocultural evolution
- Conservation movement
- Cultural landscape
- Ecology
- Ecosystem
- Environmental protection
- Terralingua
