= Rick Stepp =

John Richard Stepp
- Education: University of California, University of Georgia
- Scientific career
- Fields: Anthropology, Ethnobotany, Ethnoecology
- Workplaces: University of Florida
- Doctoral advisor: Brent Berlin
- Website: https://anthro.ufl.edu/2013/09/29/rstepp/

John Richard 'Rick' Stepp is an anthropologist and ethnobiologist who currently holds the position of UF Research Foundation Professor at the University of Florida. Stepp was previously the G. P. Wilder Professor of Botany at the University of Hawaii.

His work examines the strong relationship between biological diversity and cultural diversity. Stepp studied ecology at the Universities of Florida and Georgia under the tutelage of Howard T. Odum, Eugene P. Odum, Frank Golley and Bernard Patten. His PhD advisor in ecological anthropology was Brent Berlin. He has also been involved in research on the importance of weeds as medicinal plants for indigenous peoples. He serves as a regional governor for Slow Food USA. He has served as the editor-in-chief of the Journal of Ethnobiology from 2005 to 2008 and from 2021 to present, has presided the Society for Ethnobotany (2014-15) and the International Society of Ethnobiology (2018-2022).
