= Basic Color Terms =

Linguistics book by Brent Berlin and Paul Kay

Basic Color Terms: Their Universality and Evolution
- First edition
- Author: Brent Berlin and Paul Kay
- Language: English
- Genre: Linguistics
- Publisher: University of California Press
- Publication date: 1969
- Publication place: Berkeley, California, USA
- Media type: Print
- Pages: 178
- ISBN: 1-57586-162-3
- LC Class: P341.B4

Basic Color Terms: Their Universality and Evolution (1969; ISBN 1-57586-162-3) is a book by Brent Berlin and Paul Kay. Berlin and Kay's work proposed that the basic color terms in a culture, such as black, brown, or red, are predictable by the number of color terms the culture has. All cultures have terms for black/dark and white/bright. If a culture has three color terms, the third is red. If a culture has four, it has either yellow or green. (Note that this counts only the "basic" color terms. It does not include terms or descriptions such as "light blue", "carrot-colored", or "taupe". For more information, see the page on color terms.)

Berlin and Kay posit seven levels in which cultures fall, with Stage I languages having only the colors black (dark–cool) and white (light–warm). Languages in Stage VII have eight or more basic color terms. This includes English, which has eleven basic color terms. The authors theorize that as languages evolve, they acquire new basic color terms in a strict chronological sequence; if a basic color term is found in a language, then the colors of all earlier stages should also be present. The sequence is as follows:

- Stage I: Dark-cool and light-warm (this covers a larger set of colors than just English "black" and "white".)
- Stage II: Red
- Stage III: Either green or yellow
- Stage IV: Both green and yellow
- Stage V: Blue
- Stage VI: Brown
- Stage VII: Purple, pink, orange, or gray

The work has achieved widespread influence. However, the constraints in color-term ordering have been substantially loosened, both by Berlin and Kay in later publications and by various critics. Barbara Saunders questioned the methodologies of data collection and the cultural assumptions underpinning the research, as has Stephen C. Levinson.

== See also ==
- Linguistic relativity and the color naming debate
- Blue–green distinction in language
- Color blindness
