= Luisa Maffi =

American anthropologist

Luisa Maffi is an Italian American anthropologist who is co-founder and Director of Terralingua, an international NGO devoted to sustaining the biocultural diversity of life - the world’s biological, cultural, and linguistic diversity - through research, education, policy-relevant work, and on-the-ground action. She is a pioneer and leading thinker in the field of biocultural diversity.

== Education ==
Maffi has a B.A. in linguistics from the University of Rome and a Ph.D. in anthropology from the University of California, Berkeley.

== Career ==
Maffi was born in Rome, Italy and resides in British Columbia, Canada.

After completing her bachelor's degree, she worked on an Italian government project to produce a Somali reference grammar and dictionary. Maffi became interested in Somali color terms, and was encouraged to go to graduate school at University of California, Berkeley by Brent Berlin. At UC Berkeley she joined a project on Tzeltal Maya ethnobiology.

With a background in linguistics, anthropology, and ethnobiology, she has conducted fieldwork in Somalia, Mexico, China and Japan. Her research has been supported by grants and fellowships from NATO, the US National Science Foundation, and the Wenner-Gren Foundation, among others. In 1998-2003 she was a Research Associate in the Anthropology Department at the Field Museum of Natural History in Chicago, Illinois, and in 1999-2004 a Research Associate in the Anthropology Department at the Smithsonian Institution’s National Museum of Natural History in Washington, D.C. In 1997-2000 she held a National Research Service Award fellowship from the US National Institutes of Health. She was a Fellow of the Society for Applied Anthropology (2003–2008) and in 2010 was appointed as an International Fellow of the Explorers Club.

Maffi is an adjunct professor in the department of linguistics at Simon Fraser University.

== Publications ==
- Maffi, Luisa; Woodley, Ellen (2012). Biocultural diversity conservation: a global sourcebook. Routledge. ISBN 978-1-84407-921-6.
- Carlson, Thomas J.S.; Maffi, Luisa (2004). Ethnobotany and conservation of biocultural diversity. New York Botanical Garden. ISBN 0-89327-453-4.
- Maffi, Luisa, ed. (2001). On Biocultural Diversity. Smithsonian Institution. ISBN 9781560989301.
- Maffi, Luisa (1994). A linguistic analysis of Tzeltal Maya ethnosymptomatology. University of California, Berkeley.
