= Terralingua =

International non-profit organization

- Founded: 1996
- Type: Non-governmental organization
- Purpose: Indigenous rights, biocultural diversity
- Region served: Worldwide
- Key people: Luisa Maffi and Dave Harmon, founders
- Website: terralingua.org

Terralingua is a 501(c)(3) non-profit organization under U.S. tax law (#38–3291259) and a registered non-profit society in Canada based on Salt Spring Island in Vancouver, British Columbia whose mission is to support the integrated protection, maintenance and restoration of the biocultural diversity of life. Created in 1996, Terralingua's founders Luisa Maffi and Dave Harmon pioneered the concept and field of Biocultural Diversity, building on emergent ideas about the links between biological and cultural diversity.

In 2001, Terralingua received the first foundation grant ever given explicitly for Biocultural Diversity research and applications—an unsolicited Ford Foundation grant that allowed the non-profit to establish a long-term program of work focused on five areas: Mapping biocultural diversity, measuring and monitoring biocultural diversity, maintaining biocultural diversity, networking for biocultural diversity, and promoting policies for biocultural diversity.

== History and beginnings ==
In 1996, the same year Terralingua launched its operations, it organized its first conference on biocultural diversity called "Endangered Languages, Endangered Knowledge, Endangered Environments." Held at the University of California, Berkeley, the conference brought together internationally recognized researchers and practitioners in the social, natural, linguistics, and behavioral sciences, as well as Indigenous thinkers and activists, to discuss the “converging extinction crisis” of the biocultural diversity of life.

Within two years of being founded, Terralingua began to receive invitations to collaborate with major environmental and cultural organizations including World Wildlife Fund, United Nations Environment Programme, United Nations Educational, Scientific and Cultural Organization (UNESCO), The International Union for Conservation of Nature (IUCN), the Convention on Biological Diversity, the Millennium Ecosystem Assessment, and other international, academic and research-based institutions, and museums.

In 2003, Terralingua developed the first educational booklet on Biocultural Diversity, in collaboration with UNESCO Sharing a World of Difference: The Earth’s Linguistic, Cultural, and Biological Diversity, along with the companion map, The World’s Biocultural Diversity: People, Languages, and Ecosystems (UNESCO, 2003). A year later, Terralingua created the first index jointly quantifying the global state of cultural diversity and biodiversity. The Index of Biocultural Diversity independently confirmed the overlap between cultural and biological diversity based on five indicators: languages, religions, and ethnic groups (for cultural diversity), and bird/mammal species and plant species (for biological diversity). These indicators were selected because data were readily available for them.

In 2008, in collaboration with IUCN and the American Museum of Natural History (AMNH), Terralingua co-organized a major follow-up symposium on Biocultural Diversity, "Sustaining Cultural and Biological Diversity in a Rapidly Changing World: Lessons for Public Policy", which was held at the AMNH headquarters in New York City.

Terralingua co-developed and co-sponsored the first international policy resolution focused on Biocultural Diversity, in which they requested that the IUCN, the world’s largest conservation organization, integrate cultural diversity with the conservation of biodiversity. The IUCN Member Assembly passed a motion to accept this request at the 4th World Conservation Congress in Barcelona, Spain in 2008.

== Projects and aims ==
Terralingua works to promote the investigation of the links between biological, cultural, and linguistic diversity, as well as the adoption of an integrated biocultural perspective on the perpetuation, maintenance and revitalization of diversity on Earth. Terralingua seeks to build bridges and synergies between groups and individuals working in support of the world's diverse peoples and their languages and cultures and those working to conserve species and ecosystems.

Terralingua fosters the perpetuation of the world's linguistic diversity in all its forms, regardless of political, demographic, or linguistic status, and to promote respect for linguistic human rights. The non-profit emphasizes supporting and maintaining language diversity as a whole and fostering the resilience of bioculturally diverse regions rather than on language endangerment or documentation of specific endangered languages.

Terralingua's field projects focus on restoring ecological and cultural resilience at landscape and regional levels. Through its global network, it provides information, documentation, and expertise to individuals and grassroots organizations seeking to maintain their linguistic and cultural heritage, restore the health of their environments, and uphold their human rights.

In 2001 and 2002 respectively, Terralingua's founding members published the first two books on Biocultural Diversity theory and applications. The books "On Biocultural Diversity: Linking Language, Knowledge, and the Environment" and "In Light of Our Differences: How Diversity in Nature and Culture Makes Us Human" were published by the Smithsonian Institution Press and are widely recognized as foundational texts.

In 2008, Terralingua developed the first index that measures trends in the persistence or loss of Traditional Environmental Knowledge (TEK). A year later, Terralingua developed the first Index of Linguistic Diversity to show trends in the numbers of mother tongue speakers of the world’s languages. This allowed for a quantitative rather than anecdotal assessment of the state of the world’s languages, and revealed parallel trends in linguistic diversity and biodiversity.

In 2010, Terralingua published Biocultural Diversity Conservation: A Global Sourcebook (Luisa Maffi and Ellen Woodley, Earthscan)and launched Biocultural Diversity Conservation: A Community of Practice, a companion portal to the book that was designed for researchers, professionals, policy makers, and the public.

Recent Terralingua activities include developing a broad-ranging educational campaign on Biocultural Diversity to reach academics, professionals, policy makers, schools, and the general public. Additionally, the non-profit is working on school curriculum and study guides to engage students on a range of issues related to Biocultural Diversity.

Terralingua has received grants from The Christensen Fund, the International Development Research Centre (IDRC) in Canada, as well as support from international organizations and academic institutions. In 2007, Terralingua was given a bequest from the estate of former Terralingua member Dr. Aldon Roat, which became a principal funding source.

== Media ==
Terralingua's work has received attention from media over the years for its research and outreach activities, and has been featured in the New York Times, New York Times Magazine, Wired Magazine, and National Geographic.

In 2008, Terry Glavin, Canadian author and journalist, and winner of several science-related journalism awards wrote an article, "In Defense of Difference", where he referred to Luisa Maffi, Terralingua Director, as a leader who paved the way for “biocultural diversity” to start "...showing up with increasing frequency in the lexicon of a wide variety of scientists and academics concerned with the phenomenon of extinction." Writes Glavin, "That we are beginning to understand the intricacies of these relationships is due in no small measure to the work of Italian-born anthropologist and linguist Luisa Maffi."

Terralingua has been featured on the blogs WiserEarth, NatGeo News Watch and Huffington Post.
