= Colexification =

Multi-meaning encoding in words, comprising vagueness, polysemy, and homonymy

In semantics and lexical typology, colexification is the ability for a language to express different meanings with the same word.

When a language colexifies several concepts, this is generally understood as a sign that these concepts are semantically related. Research in lexical typology has thus been using colexification as a tool to measure semantic similarity between concepts.

== Definition ==
Colexification describes the case of different meanings being expressed by the same word (i.e., "co-lexified") in a language. For example, the two senses which are distinguished in English as people and village are colexified in Spanish, which uses pueblo in both cases.

Colexification is meant as a neutral descriptive term that avoids distinguishing between vagueness, polysemy, and homonymy. Some cases of colexification are common across the world (e.g. 'blue' = 'green'); others are typical of certain linguistic and cultural areas (e.g. 'tree' = 'fire' among Papuan and Australian languages; or 'thunder' = 'dragon' in the Sino-Tibetan languages).

The opposite of "co-lexify" is "dis-lexify", i.e. 'express two meanings using different lexical forms'. Thus, Russian colexifies 'arm' and 'hand' using the single word рука, but Spanish dislexifies these two meanings using two distinct words, respectively brazo v. mano.

== Examples ==
Language	Word form	sense 1	sense 2	sense 3
Basque	herri	'village'	'people'	'country'
Spanish	pueblo	'village'	'people'	
Catalan	sentir	'feel'	'hear'	
French	femme	'woman'	'wife'	
French	fille	'girl'	'daughter'	
French	grand	'large'	'tall (in size)'	'grown up (in age)'
English	uncle	'mother's brother'	'father's brother'	'aunt's husband'
English	draw	'pull, drag'	'depict w/ lines'	
Kriol	gilim	'hit'	'kill'	
Chinese	天 tiān	'sky'	'heaven'	'day'
Japanese	木 ki	'tree'	'wood'	
Mota	pane-	'arm'	'hand'	'wing'
Italian	ciao	'hello'	'goodbye'	
Vietnamese	chào	'hello'	'goodbye'	
LSF	(sign)	'hello'	'thanks'	
LSF	(sign)	'(s.o.) kind, nice'	'(s.th.) easy'	

== Use in linguistic studies ==
A given language is said to colexify two functionally distinct senses if, and only if, it can associate them with the same lexical form.

— François (2008: 170)

The term was coined by the linguist Alexandre François in his 2008 article "Semantic maps and the typology of colexification". This article illustrated the notion with various examples, including the semantic domains of { straight }, { call }, { breathe }. The latter notion is at the source of a colexification network that is attested in several languages, linking together such senses as 'breath', 'life', 'soul', 'spirit', 'ghost'...: Sanskrit आत्मन् ātmán; Ancient Greek ψυχή, πνεῦμα; Latin animus, spīritus; Arabic روح rūḥ, etc. François built on that example to propose a method for constructing lexical semantic maps.

Several studies have taken up the concept of colexification and applied it to different semantic domains and various language families.

Colexification is also the object of a dedicated database, known as CLiCS "Database of Cross-Linguistic Colexifications". Based on data from more than 2400 language varieties of the world, the database makes it possible to check the typological frequency of individual instances of colexification, and to visualize semantic networks based on empirical data from the world's languages.

== See also ==
- Homograph
- Onomasiology
- Ontology
- Polysemy
- Synonymy
- Semantic change
- Semantic maps
