= Brent Berlin =

American anthropologist (born 1936)

Overton Brent Berlin (born 1936) is an American anthropologist, most noted for his work with linguist Paul Kay on color, and his ethnobiological research among the Maya of Chiapas, Mexico.

He received his Ph.D. from Stanford University in 1964. Until recently, Berlin was Graham Perdue Professor of Anthropology at the University of Georgia, where he was also director of the center for Latin American and Caribbean Studies and co-director for the Laboratories of Ethnobiology.

His work alongside Paul Kay on the 1969 publication of Basic Color Terms: Their Universality and Evolution built on the ideas of Lazarus Geiger in the field of color terminology research and has been highly influential in anthropology, linguistics and cognitive sciences. Berlin and Kay concluded that the number of basic color terms in the world's languages are limited and center on certain focal colors, assumed to be cognitively hardwired.

He led the Maya ICGB project, a bioprospecting consortium, supported by the Biodiversity Program for the National Institutes of Health, which was closed in 2001 after accusations of failure to obtain adequate informed consent from the Maya community from which he obtained indigenous knowledge. These allegations were primarily driven by a Canadian-based political activist organization, known at the time as RAFI. He was elected a Fellow of the American Academy of Arts and Sciences in 1981.

== Education ==
Berlin received a B.A. from the University of Oklahoma in 1959, and an M.A. from Stanford University in 1960. He then obtained his Ph.D. from Stanford in 1964 in anthropology.

== Works in ethnobiology ==
Berlin is well known in the field of ethnobiology, or the study of how people name, use, and organize the names and the knowledge about the plants and animals around them. He also further focused on Folk biology, a sub field of ethnobiology, which refers to the biological classification and reasoning particular to a cultural group. Understanding societies’ interactions with their environment is vital to understanding the culture of the people. Berlin's contribution to the evolution of ethnobiology as a field has been invaluable to many anthropologists. Considering "a series of landmark publications concerning ethnobiological classification, Berlin has remained a prime architect of the descriptive and analytic frameworks now widely regarded as standard and major theory."(1994)

=== Covert categories and folk taxonomies (1968) ===
In 1968, Berlin, Breedlove and Raven studied the botanical ethnography of the Tzeltal Maya people of Chiapas, Mexico. They published an article titled Covert Categories and Folk Taxonomy.

They found a way to determine, with a high degree of reliability, the major outlines of the named taxonomic structure of the plant world for Tzeltal speakers. Tzeltal is one of the Mayan languages spoken in Mexico, in which most linguists distinguish six different regional dialects. In this study, they found many cultural and meaningful categories related by inclusion that are not conventionally labeled. In their language, the different plants in each category all have a common word structure that puts them apart from all of the other plants. They found that you cannot trace the words back to a single source where all plant names are included. In most languages, they have a "unique beginner" that you can trace the names back to. What Berlin and his colleagues found is that plants and animals are thought of as two separate unnamed classes. In plant taxonomy, the highest level is not a "unique beginner" but is instead represented by four major lexemes or units. These four levels are trees, vines, grasses, and herbs. There are more minor classes that include cacti, agaves, bamboos, etc. There are also very few midlevel plant categories. All of the Tzeltal specific taxa (those that which include no other members) fall into the different major and minor sublevels in their taxonomy. But, it is odd to note that the midlevel category hihte, or "oak", contains the plants sikyok and cikinib which neither share the same linguistic structure with their "parent plant."

To test the hypothesis they first went through the community, observed, and recorded information from their informants comments of the plants in their natural habitats. When they went out into the field to collect data, they noticed that some of 10,000 specimens that were located in the same named contrast set were closely related than others. They take into account the uses of the certain plants including food, herbs, firewood and so on.

A second method that was used helped with searching for possible subgroupings within contrast sets of large numbers was to determine the extent to which informants subdivided lists of plant names. To do this, they wrote the names of different names of plants and animals on slips of papers and then gave them to their informants. After doing this, the informants then put the slips of papers into groups that were most like each other. The results showed that they had no trouble placing them in the different categories of "plants" and "animals." This also showed that though they did not have a word for it they did know of the existence of "plants." After this, they broke down the taxonomy even further by giving them different "plant" names and asking them the same question, as before they had no problem labeling each plant into the different groups or categories.

After they established that they understood the existence of subgroupings, they used three different procedures to find out how they define the features of certain plants. The first procedure was called the triads test in which the informants chose which item out of a group of three was the most different. The results indicated how they group things together based upon similarity.

The second procedure involved constructing folk keys. The keys are used to help distinguish the different plants from the other based upon the traits. They then used these to get a better understanding of why certain plants were put in certain places in their taxonomy. First they would give the informants the names of plants that they had earlier grouped together (when the researchers gave them the slips of papers with names on them), then they were asked to create a key that would help distinguish each plant from each other. In doing this, the informants showed how they make their divisions between plants and decide which group to put them in.

Finally, they conducted a study consisting of paired comparisons of all the items in a particular set of plant names. The informants were asked to compare all the logical pairs in different sets and make logical comparisons and differences amongst them. Characteristics such as stem growth, size and shape of the stem and leaves, and fruit size and shape were all utilized when making the comparisons. This showed Berlin, Breedlove, and Raven what the "definitions" were for a set of terms and they were then able to bring together the like terms that were the most similar according to the informant in question. This study showed what the Tzeltal people deem as the most important features to them when they decide to on certain plants to take care of and plant for their very immediate survival.

This results from this study shows that things that do not have names for the Tzeltal speakers still exist in their eyes. The hierarchies generated by their studies are not arbitrarily spaced, instead implying a taxonomic structure. The process of having a given a name to certain life forms in their ecology shows their attachment to their surroundings, as well as a distinction between the animate and inanimate. The study helps outline three studies that other researchers can use to set up their own studies.

=== General principles of classification and nomenclature in folk biology (1973) ===
One of the first works Berlin published in relation to the budding field of ethnobiology was also one of his more influential: General Principles of Classification and Nomenclature in Folk Biology (1973) was coauthored with Dennis Breedlove of the California Academy of Sciences and Peter Raven of the Missouri Botanical Garden.

In this journal article, Berlin and team intended to illustrate three hypotheses they felt were properly supported by the data they had acquired during the research they completed. First, it is possible to isolate organisms into linguistically recognized groups called taxa, or classes. Second, these taxa can be further broken down into no more than five smaller classes called taxonomic ethnobiological categories. These smaller categories are defined in terms of certain criteria, such as having certain linguistic or taxonomic feature that are recognizable. They continued to describe how these organisms, flora or fauna, belonging to each of these categories can be arranged into a complex taxonomic hierarchy. The five ethnobiological categories are as follows: unique beginner, life form, generic, specific, and varietal. Most, if not all organisms can be placed taxonomically into these categories. They turned their attentions to the formal linguistic structure of the lexemic nomenclature of the plants and animals and to which taxa each of these organisms belong to. After laying out the criteria and division of the taxa and lexemes, they used the information to discuss the Tzeltal and how they have a nomenclature system incredibly similar to that of Western botany's division of plants. The data they had obtained studying the Tzeltal and the lexemic system used to name plants was found to conform, with only a few exceptions, to the hypotheses Berlin, Breedlove, and Raven had laid out. Finally, they attempt to show how the principles demonstrated by the research suggest they can be applied to many ethnobiological classification systems since they are general. "While data on some aspects of ethnobotany and ethnozoology, especially the uses of plants and animals, are available from a wide variety of sources, good materials on the classificatory principles underlying folk biological taxonomy and nomenclature in non-Western societies are sadly lacking (1973). Berlin, Breedlove and Raven began to encourage and emphasize the importance in gaining ethnobiological information regarding nomenclature and utilizing the principles they laid out to increase our knowledge of potentially general cognitive categorizing, the people who use these taxonomic systems, and how these systems can influence our view of the environment around us.

In a following article published in the American Ethnologist (1976), Berlin attempted to address some criticisms he had encountered regarding the ethnobiological concept of category, hereafter also referred to as rank, by applying some of his previous principles to new information on biological classification of the Aguaruna. Some claim the boundaries to determine ranks are arbitrary or that there is no validity to the rank concept. The conclusion of the report stated, "[…] the vast majority of conceptually recognized plant classes in Aguaruna are easily accommodated into one of the proposed ranks in a natural and straightforward fashion. These data suggest that ranks are neither arbitrary nor a mere typological cataloging device invented for the convenience of the ethnographer. On the contrary, the Aguaruna’s view of the plant world provides additional support for the hypothesis that the concept of rank is fundamental to all systems of folk biological classification" (1976). However, that publication did not end the controversy. Sillitoe argued that ethnobiological classification was not nearly as neatly hierarchically arranged, and the ranks were more artificial, than previously believed; he summarized his views thus: "For the Wola, the classification of animals is inherently dynamic and subject to negotiation; there can be no closure or final bounded version, no authoritative comprehensive arrangement. The absence of any life-form classes for some animals, such as bats, pythons, pigs, and dogs ("unaffiliated generics" [Berlin 1992:171-181]) also complies with this interpretation. For a long time (to confess to an embarrassing ethnocentric exercise), I have worried my friends into inventing "family" classes for these, in which others have invented "covert classes." They are an unnecessary fiction." Similarly, a more recent study concluded that "a more careful analysis does leave aside the idea that perhaps these findings [a ranked, neatly hierarchy of folk taxa] are merely artifacts of the collection procedure or the interpretation of data, which forces an adaptation of the findings to the principles formulated by Berlin" Some recent studies still use folk taxonomic ranks, but these highlight some problems. For instance, Guasparri's analysis of Antique Roman ethnobiological classification (from the third century BCE to the fourth century CE) required eight ethnotaxonomic ranks, rather than the five or six normally recognized, and this included three sub-life form ranks (between the ranks "life form" and "intermediate"), whereas Berlin recognized no sub-life form ranks in his works. Such considerations led various systematists and specialists of biological nomenclature to conclude that such absolute ranks do not exist in ethnotaxonomies.

=== Ethnobiological classification (1992) ===
One of Berlin's most well known contributions to ethnobiology is his 1992 book, Ethnobiological Classification: Principles of Categorization of Plants and Animals in Traditional Societies.

In this book, Berlin analyzes the widespread commonalities in classification and naming purposes of the local flora and fauna among traditional, non-literate societies. It helps develop and reaffirm the "universalist" approach to ethnobiology. He explains the "basic principles" that he feels form the groundwork for a comparative ethnobiology. He also talks about the three main levels of classification; generic, specific, and higher-order. He wants to stress the importance of prototypes and the fact that "perceptual motivation" underpins not only genera, but also intermediate and life form categories, although he points out that he understands that the life form categories does not neatly reflect biological taxa. In another part of the book, he explores the patterned variations in ethnobiological knowledge. He brings up an interesting suggestion that ethnobiological nomenclature is not necessarily arbitrary, but often reflects some aspect of the inherent quality of the organism. "Brent Berlin maintains that these patterns can best be explained by the similarity of human beings' largely unconscious appreciation of the natural affinities among groupings of plants and animals: people recognize and name a grouping of organisms quite independently of its actual or potential usefulness or symbolic significance in human society" (2009). This implies that the ability and want to categorize is nearly innate in humans. This claim challenged some anthropologists’ beliefs that one's sense of reality is determined by culture; that the subjective and unique view one has of their surroundings is controlled little by the world around the individual. He argues throughout the book against his colleagues that only natural species that have "evident utility for man have been named." He constantly argues against a neo-malinowskian functionalism, which makes humans out to seem as simply contemplative materialists unknowingly seeking out only the things that will ensure our happiness and survival and leaving everything else to be on its own for its own survival. He also focused on the structure of ethnobiological classification based on individual nomenclature systems he has researched or seen at work firsthand. He addressed the processes at work to affect the evolution of ethnobiology and the systems involved. Berlin has received a lot of praise on this book. In reference to the book, Terence Hays says, "Here, Berlin deals straightforwardly and systematically with his major critics, acknowledging that ‘the patterns recognized nearly two decades ago must now be restated in light of new evidence and new theoretical insights that have emerged since that time’" (1994:3).

=== Medical ethnobiology of the Highland Maya (1996) ===
Some of Berlin’s more recent work is focused on medical ethnobiology and modern Mayan populations. In 1996, in collaboration with his wife, Elois Ann Berlin, he published a book entitled Medical Ethnobiology of the Highland Maya of Chiapas, Mexico: The Gastrointestinal Diseases.(1996)

In this work, Berlin and Berlin focus on two specific Maya speaking groups, the Tzeltal and the Tzotzil. As opposed to focusing on the standard ritual and symbolism approach to understanding the medicinal properties of Mayan healing, the book’s focus is on the ethnobotanical approach. The Tzeltal/Tzotzil have a wealth of knowledge regarding symptomatic diseases and the medicinal herbs that alleviate the symptoms associated with these diseases. Some of the most devastating diseases that affect these people are gastrointestinal diseases. Berlin and Berlin outline the symptomology, treatment, ingredients of the herbs administered, and even the classification of these diseases. Over the time that they researched, they began to realize that the administration of these herbs were condition specific were extremely effective if the condition was known to those treating.

In 2008, Brent Berlin and Elois Ann Berlin were recognized by the Society for Economic Botany. They received the Distinguished Economic Botanist Award. "‘The work of Brent Berlin and Elois Ann Berlin over the last four decades has led to major theoretical advances in cognitive and medical Ethnobiology,’ said Rick Stepp, a member of the council of the Society for Economic Botany."(2008) Brent Berlin has generated information and new techniques of analyzing data that has influenced many well established members of the field and up and coming students who strive to be an asset to the social sciences.

== Works on color ==
In the book, Basic Color Terms: Their Universality and Evolution (1969), a collaboration between Berlin and Paul Kay, they used around 100 different languages to see how many basic color terms for each language are universal. The data they present states that there are around 11 universal basic color terms for languages in which there are always terms for white and black present in all languages. They depicted a set of stages which state that if there are 3 color terms presented, this is attributed to include red, also. There are several more steps in which other colors are then added until there are languages with 8 or more basic color terms. In one experiment, they used painted chips with several different color hues and told the speakers in their native language to point out the basic color in the focal point and the outer hues they also connect it to. This helped them gauge what difference in hues of colors people from different languages appropriated with each basic color term. Because there are many different names for colors in each society, the data helped note what the basic terms for simple colors were and how many different hues they connected to those basic colors.

Berlin also studied the classifications of color for the Aguaruna people of north-central Peru. In this research, he found out that a majority of these people match up with the stage three color views from the 1969 work, in which the Aguaruna have names for black, white, red, and a color they call grue. In his article, Aguaruna Color Categories (1975), he discusses the findings of how they classify and name colors. When he mentions that they have the color grue, he states that it is a "GRUE [green + blue],…it appears to be blue rather than green"(1975). Although the majority of the people he studied matched up with this third stage of color classification and naming, there were others that often had the names to multiple other colors and were attributed to knowing more Spanish than the others. In their native language, it is possible that they did not have words for all of the colors that are available to use in Spanish. During their research, they soon noticed that there was no specific name for the word "color" in the Aguaruna language. Often, they had an easier time when speaking with the bilingual people that also knew Spanish. This helped them compile an early list of 10 color terms in both Spanish and Aguaruna.

Instead of depending solely on the painted chips like they did in the previous experiment, they "began presenting items of natural or artificial object and asking...’what stain does it have’, a question provided us by a bilingual teacher"(1975). He mentioned later that they were able to find objects of all colors except pink and brown and that this type of color naming procedure helped the participants answer more quickly and was more enjoyable during the study. In addition to this way of color questioning, they also brought some painted cards because they could not find painted chips and used those along with the objects.

During the research, they presented the colored objects and asked which types people associated with certain colors, in no particular order, and wrote the results down. After this questioning, they presented cards with different colors and told the participants to choose a focal point for various colors and point out how many cards they attributed to each color. In their findings they noticed how people that were monolingual in Aguaruna only recognized names for the basic white, black, red, and grue while others that spoke a little or were bilingual in Spanish knew the names of many more colors presented. In his findings on the topic of color terminology among the Aguaruna, he noticed that people with access to different languages outside of the community have picked up various names for colors from a different language and brought them into the community in order for some to have access to multiple color terms they might not have had in their own language.

== Bioprospecting and the Maya ICBG controversy ==
In 1998 Berlin and his wife, Elois A. Berlin, founded an International Cooperative Biodiversity Group - the Maya ICGB. The group was intended as a combined bioprospecting and research cooperative between the University of Georgia where the Berlins were employed, a Mexican university, a Welsh pharmaceutical company and a newly created NGO called PROMAYA supposed to represent the Indigenous Maya of Chiapas. The aim was to collect and document the ethnobotanical knowledge of the Maya peoples of Chiapas—one of the world's biodiversity hotspots—with the goal of discovering, patenting, producing, and marketing medicines based on Maya ethnobiological knowledge. The NGO PROMAYA was established as a foundation through which the project could share rights and benefits with the indigenous holders of the medicinal knowledge.

Soon after being initiated the project became the subject of harsh criticisms by indigenous activists and Mexican intellectuals who questioned how knowledge obtained from individual Maya could be patented by researchers or foreign pharmaceutical companies, how the PROMAYA NGO established by the Berlins and under their control could be considered representative of the many different Maya communities in Chiapas, and how it was possible for the knowledge that had been collective property of the Maya peoples to become suddenly privatized without the prior consent of each of the individual initial holders of the knowledge. The Berlins argued that the establishment of the NGO was the only feasible way of managing benefit sharing with the community and of obtaining prior informed consent, and they that since the traditional knowledge was in the public domain among the Maya no individual Maya could expect remuneration. As tensions mounted the Mexican partner withdrew its support for the project, and later the NIH, which caused the project to be closed down in 2001 - without having been able to produce any results.

The Maya ICBG case was among the first to draw attention to the problems of distinguishing between bioprospecting and biopiracy, and to the difficulties of securing community participation and prior informed consent for bioprospectors.

== Select publications ==
- Berlin, Brent. 1968. Tzeltal Numeral Classifiers: A Study in Ethnographic Semantics. The Hague: Janua Linguarum.
- Berlin, Brent. 1992. Ethnobiological classification: principles of categorization of plants and animals in traditional societies. Princeton, N.J.: Princeton University Press. ISBN 0-691-09469-1
- Berlin, Brent. 1995. "Huambisa Sound Symbolism." In Sound symbolism, edited by Leanne Hinton, Johanna Nichols, and John J. Ohala. Cambridge [England]: Cambridge University Press.
- Berlin, Elois Ann, and Brent Berlin. 1996. Medical ethnobiology of the Highland Maya of Chiapas, Mexico: the gastrointestinal diseases. Princeton, N.J.: Princeton University Press.

== Recognition ==
- National Academy of Sciences 1980
- Fyssen Foundation Prize 2000
- Distinguished Economic Botanist Award with Elois Ann Berlin 2008
