= Paul Kay =

American linguist

Paul Kay (born 1934 in New York) is an emeritus professor of linguistics at the University of California, Berkeley, United States. He joined the University in 1966 as a member of the Department of Anthropology, transferring to the Department of Linguistics in 1982 and now working at the International Computer Science Institute (ICSI). He is best known for his work with anthropologist Brent Berlin on colour: Basic Color Terms: Their Universality and Evolution (1969) ISBN 1-57586-162-3. More recently, he has worked in the area of Construction Grammar with Charles J. Fillmore, authoring the textbook Construction Grammar (1996 manuscript). He is currently working on an extension of Construction Grammar called Sign-Based Construction Grammar, authoring a book on this topic with Charles J. Fillmore, Ivan Sag and Laura Michaelis.

Since 2005 Kay has returned to experimental testing of the Sapir-Whorf hypothesis and his findings show that taking into account brain lateralization allows another perspective on the debate. More specifically he proposed that "Whorf hypothesis is supported in the right visual field but not the left".

== See also ==
- Lazarus Geiger
