= Lazarus Geiger =

German Jewish philosopher and philologist (1829–1870)

- Born: 21 May 1829; Frankfurt-on-Main
- Died: 29 August 1870 (aged 41)

Philosophical work
- Era: 19th-century philosophy
- Region: Western philosophy
- School: Philology
- Main interests: Philosophy of language, Philology
- Notable works: Ursprung und Entwickelung der menschlichen Sprache und Vernunft, Der Ursprung der Sprache
- Notable ideas: Connection between human reason and language evolution, Indo-Germanic language origin

Lazarus Geiger (21 May 1829 – 29 August 1870) was a German-Jewish philosopher and philologist.

== Life ==
He was born at Frankfurt-on-Main, was destined to commerce, but soon gave himself up to scholarship and studied at Marburg, Bonn and Heidelberg. From 1861 till his sudden death in 1870 he was professor in the Jewish high school at Frankfurt. His chief aim was to prove that the evolution of human reason is closely bound up with that of language. He further maintained that the origin of the Indo-Germanic language is to be sought not in Asia but in central (Germany). He was a convinced opponent of rationalism in religion.

It was Lazarus Geiger, ... who first detected universal sequence in the acquisition of basic colour terms.

== Bibliography ==
Lazarus Geiger's chief work was Ursprung und Entwickelung der menschlichen Sprache und Vernunft (vol. i., Stuttgart, 1868), the principal results of which appeared in a more popular form as Der Ursprung der Sprache (Stuttgart, 1869 and 1878). The second volume of the former was published in an incomplete form (1872, 2nd ed. 1899) after his death by his brother Alfred Geiger.

Alfred Geiger also published a number of Lazarus Geiger's scattered papers as Zur Entwickelung der Menschheit (1871, and ed. 1878; Eng. trans. D. Asher, Hist. of the Development of the Human Race, London, 1880).
