= Collective cognitive imperative =

The collective cognitive imperative is an internal command or obligation felt by suggestible people that often drives their joining some group. Besides requiring the person accept the group’s belief system, it outlines culturally agreed on behavioral constraints and roles to be acted out. While the group is usually thought of as a formally well-defined one such as a tribe, church, cult, or commune, this imperative can be less rigorously connected to peer pressure—in which case it can apply to ill-defined groups like being "a cool person". It can likewise be related to joining the "winners" through "The Bandwagon Effect".

The "collective cognitive" part of its name connects it to group decision-making. Rather than an individual internally and analytically weighing the merits of believing in something or acting a certain way, this imperative requires that he or she trust an external authority accepted by the group. The authority can be a person such as preacher, shaman, hypnotist, or celebrity, or something else such as voice from a speaker, TV image, drum, sacred book, magic charm, etc. Often a period of indoctrination must occur before both the suggestible person and other members feel the person now belongs to the group.

Depending upon the group they join, those who succumb to the collective cognitive imperative may be ridiculed by others as failing to do their own thinking, undermining their own individuality or giving up certain rights. In that sense such suggestible people can be likened to herd animals such as sheep (see Sheeple). Such ridicule typically will not occur after a religious conversion brings a previous non-conformist into the fold of the culture’s dominant religion.

== History and current relevance ==
The term 'collective cognitive imperative' was first used by Princeton University psychology professor Julian Jaynes in his 1976 book The Origin of Consciousness in the Breakdown of the Bicameral Mind.^{1} Jaynes viewed it as one of four aspects of the "General Bicameral Paradigm" which he used to characterize many modern phenomena that involve a diminished consciousness, such as oracles and spiritual possession, which Jaynes hypothesized as "vestiges" of the non-conscious ancient mentality he called "the Bicameral Mind".

== See also ==
- Crowd psychology
- Groupthink
- Mind control
