= Bicameral mentality =

Hypothesis in psychology

Bicameral mentality is a psychological hypothesis proposed by American psychologist Julian Jaynes. It suggests that early modern humans experienced thoughts and emotions not as originating within themselves but as commands from external "gods". According to the hypothesis, the human mind once functioned with a division in which one part generated verbal instructions while a second part obeyed, forming a "bicameral mind". The eventual collapse of this mental structure is proposed to have led to the development of self-reflective consciousness in humans.

The term was coined by Jaynes, who presented the idea in his 1976 book The Origin of Consciousness in the Breakdown of the Bicameral Mind, wherein he makes the case that a bicameral mentality was the "normal and ubiquitous state" of the human mind as recently as 3,000 years ago, at the end of the Bronze Age.

== The Origin of Consciousness in the Breakdown of the Bicameral Mind ==
Jaynes uses "bicameral" (two chambers) to describe a mental state in which the experiences and memories of the right hemisphere of the brain are transmitted to the left hemisphere via auditory hallucinations. The metaphor is based on the idea of lateralization of brain function, although each half of a normal human brain is constantly communicating with the other through the corpus callosum. The metaphor is not meant to imply that the two halves of the bicameral brain were "cut off" from each other but that the bicameral mind was experienced as a different, nonconscious mental schema wherein volition in the face of novel stimuli was mediated through a linguistic control mechanism and experienced as auditory verbal hallucinations.

=== Definition ===
Bicameral mentality is nonconscious in its inability to reason and articulate about mental contents through meta-reflection, reacting without explicitly realizing and without the meta-reflective ability to give an account of why one did so. The bicameral mind thus lacks metaconsciousness, autobiographical memory, and the capacity for executive "ego functions" such as deliberate mind-wandering and conscious introspection of mental content. When bicameral mentality as a method of social control was no longer adaptive in complex civilizations, this mental model was replaced by the conscious mode of thought, which, Jaynes argued, is grounded in the acquisition of metaphorical language learned by exposure to narrative practice.

According to Jaynes, ancient people in the bicameral state of mind experienced the world in a manner that has some similarities to that of a person with schizophrenia. Rather than making conscious evaluations in novel or unexpected situations, the person hallucinated a voice or "god" giving admonitory advice or commands and obeyed without question: one was not at all conscious of one's own thought-processes per se. Jaynes's hypothesis is offered as a possible explanation of "command hallucinations" that often direct the behavior of those with first-rank symptoms of schizophrenia, as well as other voice-hearers.

=== Influences ===
==== Regarding Homeric psychology ====
Eric Robertson Dodds wrote about how ancient Greek thought may have not included rationality as defined by modern culture. In fact, the Greeks may have known that an individual did things, but the reason they did things was attributed to divine externalities, such as gods or daemons. Bruno Snell in 1953 thought that in Homeric Greek psychology there was no sense of self in the modern sense. Snell then describes how Greek culture "self-realized" the modern "intellect". A. W. H. Adkins, building on Snell's work, wrote about how ancient Greek civilization developed ego-centered psychology as an adaptation to living in city-states, before which the living in Homeric oikos did not require such integrated thought processes.

==== Regarding neurological models ====
The neurological model in The Origin of Consciousness in the Breakdown of the Bicameral Mind is a radical neuroscientific hypothesis that was based on research novel at the time, mainly on Michael Gazzaniga's split-brain experiments and left-brain interpreter theory. The more general idea of a "divided self" (contrasted with a "unitary self") has found support from psychological and neurological studies.

=== Jaynes's evidence ===
Jaynes built a case for this hypothesis that human brains existed in a bicameral state until as recently as 3,000 years ago by citing evidence from many diverse sources, including historical literature. He took an interdisciplinary approach, drawing data from many different fields. Citing Dodds, Snell, and Adkins, Jaynes proposed that until roughly the times written about in Homer's Iliad, humans did not generally have the self-awareness characteristic of consciousness as most people experience it today. Rather, the bicameral individual was guided by mental commands believed to be issued by external "gods"—commands that were recorded in ancient myths, legends, and historical accounts. This is exemplified in not only the commands given to characters in ancient epics but also the very muses of Greek mythology who "sang" the poems. According to Jaynes, the ancients literally heard muses as the direct source of their music and poetry.

Jaynes asserts that in the Iliad and sections of the Old Testament, no mention is made of any kind of cognitive processes such as introspection, and there is no apparent indication that the writers were self-aware. Jaynes suggests that the older portions of the Old Testament (such as the Book of Amos) have few or none of the features of some later books of the Old Testament (such as Ecclesiastes) as well as later works such as Homer's Odyssey, which show indications of a profoundly different kind of mentality—an early form of consciousness.

In ancient times, Jaynes noted, gods were generally much more numerous and much more anthropomorphic than in modern times, and he speculates that this was because each bicameral person had their own "god" who reflected their own desires and experiences.

He also noted that, in ancient societies, the corpses of the dead were often treated as though still alive (being seated, dressed, and even fed) as a form of ancestor worship, and Jaynes argued that the dead bodies were presumed to be still living and the source of auditory hallucinations. This adaptation to the village communities of 100 individuals or more formed the core of religion.

Citing Gazzaniga, Jaynes inferred that these "voices" came from the right brain counterparts of the left brain language centres, specifically, the counterparts to Wernicke's area and Broca's area. Jaynes noted that some studies show that auditory hallucinations correspond to increased activity in these areas of the brain.

Jaynes notes that even at the time of publication there is no consensus as to the cause or origins of schizophrenia. Jaynes argues that schizophrenia is a vestige of humanity's earlier bicameral state. Recent evidence shows that many people with schizophrenia do not just hear random voices but experience "command hallucinations" instructing their behavior or urging them to commit certain acts, such as walking into the ocean, which the listener feels they have no choice but to follow. Jaynes also argues that people with schizophrenia feel a loss of identity due to hallucinated voices taking the place of their internal monologue.

As support for Jaynes's argument, these command hallucinations are little different from the commands from gods that feature prominently in ancient stories. Indirect evidence supporting Jaynes's theory that hallucinations once played an important role in human mentality can be found in the 2007 book Muses, Madmen, and Prophets: Rethinking the History, Science, and Meaning of Auditory Hallucination by Daniel Smith.

=== Breakdown ===
Jaynes theorized that a shift from bicameral mentality marked the beginning of introspection and consciousness as we know it today. According to Jaynes, this bicameral mentality began malfunctioning or "breaking down" during the 2nd millennium BCE. He speculates that primitive ancient societies tended to collapse periodically—for example, Egypt's Intermediate Periods, as well as the periodically vanishing cities of the Maya—as changes in the environment strained the sociocultural equilibria sustained by this bicameral mindset.

The Late Bronze Age collapse of the 2nd millennium BCE led to mass migrations and created a rash of unexpected situations and stresses that required ancient minds to become more flexible and creative. Self-awareness, or consciousness, was the culturally evolved solution to this problem. This necessity of communicating commonly observed phenomena among individuals who shared no common language or cultural upbringing encouraged those communities to become self-aware to survive in a new environment. Thus, consciousness, like bicameral mentality, emerged as a neurological adaptation to social complexity in a changing world.

Jaynes further argues that divination, prayer, and oracles arose during this breakdown period in an attempt to summon instructions from the "gods" whose voices could no longer be heard. The consultation of special bicamerally operative individuals, or of divination by casting lots and so forth, was a response to this loss, a transitional era depicted, for example, in the book of 1 Samuel. It was also evidenced in children who could communicate with the gods, but as their neurology was set by language and society, they gradually lost that ability. Those who continued prophesying, being bicameral, according to Jaynes, could be killed.

Leftovers of the bicameral mind today, according to Jaynes, include mental illnesses such as schizophrenia. Jaynes says that there is no evidence of insanity existing prior to the breakdown of the bicameral mind and that this is indirect evidence for his theory. He considered that previous claims of insanity in Homeric literature are based on mistranslations.

== Reception and influence ==
=== Popular reception ===
Early coverage by Sam Keen in the November 1977 issue of Psychology Today considered Jaynes's hypothesis worthy and offered conditional support, arguing the notion deserves further study. The Origin of Consciousness in the Breakdown of the Bicameral Mind was a successful work of popular science, selling out the first print run before a second could replace it. It received dozens of positive book reviews, including those by well-known critics such as John Updike in The New Yorker, Christopher Lehmann-Haupt in the New York Times, and Marshall McLuhan in the Toronto Globe and Mail. Articles on Jaynes and his ideas appeared in Time in 1977, and in Quest/78 in 1978. The book was nominated for the National Book Award in Contemporary Thought in 1978. Philip K. Dick, Terence McKenna, and David Bowie have all cited the book as an influence.

=== Scholarly reactions ===
According to Jaynes, language is a necessary but not sufficient condition for consciousness: Language existed thousands of years earlier, but consciousness did not emerge as soon as language did. The idea that language is a necessary component of subjective consciousness and more abstract forms of thinking has gained the support of proponents including Andy Clark, Daniel Dennett, William H. Calvin, Merlin Donald, John Limber, Howard Margolis, Peter Carruthers, and José Luis Bermúdez.

An early criticism by philosopher Ned Block argued that Jaynes had confused the emergence of consciousness with the emergence of the concept of consciousness. In other words, according to Block, humans were conscious all along but did not have the concept of consciousness and thus did not discuss it in their texts. Daniel Dennett countered that for some things, such as money, baseball, or consciousness, one cannot have the thing without also having the concept of the thing.

Gary Williams defends the Jaynesian definition of consciousness as a social–linguistic construct learned in childhood, structured in terms of lexical metaphors and narrative practice, against Ned Block's criticism that it is "ridiculous" to suppose that consciousness is a cultural construction, while the Dutch philosophy professor Jan Sleutels offers an additional critique of Block.

H. Steven Moffic questioned why Jaynes's theory was left out of a discussion on auditory hallucinations by Asaad & Shapiro (1986). The authors' published response was, "Jaynes' hypothesis makes for interesting reading and stimulates much thought in the receptive reader. It does not, however, adequately explain one of the central mysteries of madness: hallucination."

The new evidence for Jaynes's model of auditory hallucinations arising in the right temporal-parietal lobe and being transmitted to the left temporal-parietal lobe that some neuroimaging studies suggest was discussed by various respondents.

Jaynes described the range of responses to his book as "from people who feel [the ideas are] very important all the way to very strong hostility. ... When someone comes along and says consciousness is in history, it can't be accepted. If [psychologists] did accept it, they wouldn't have the motivation to go back into the laboratory ..."

Marcel Kuijsten, founder of the Julian Jaynes Society, wrote that in the decades since the book's publication, "there have been few in-depth discussions, either positive or negative" about it, rejecting as too simplistic the criticism that "Jaynes was wrong".

==== Individual scholars' comments ====
Sociologist W. T. Jones asked in 1979, "Why, despite its implausibility, is [Jaynes's] book taken seriously by thoughtful and intelligent people?" Jones agreed with Jaynes that "the language in which talk about consciousness is conducted is metaphorical", but he contradicted the basis of Jaynes's argument – that metaphor creates consciousness – by asserting that "language (and specifically metaphor) does not create, it discovers, the similarities that language marks". Jones also argued that three "cosmological orientations" biased Jaynes's thinking: 1) "hostility to Darwin" and natural selection; 2) a "longing for 'lost bicamerality'" (Jones accused Jaynes of holding that "we would all be better off if 'everyone' were once again schizophrenic"); 3) a "desire for a sweeping, all-inclusive formula that explains everything that has happened". Jones concluded that "those who share these biases ... are likely to find the book convincing; those who do not will reject [Jaynes's] arguments".

Walter J. Ong noted that the Homeric Iliad is a structurally oral epic poem so, he asserted, the very different cultural approach of oral culture is sufficient justification for the apparent different mentalities in the poem.

Philosopher Daniel Dennett suggested that Jaynes may have been wrong about some of his supporting arguments – especially the importance he attached to hallucinations – but that these things are not essential to his main thesis: "If we are going to use this top-down approach, we are going to have to be bold. We are going to have to be speculative, but there is good and bad speculation, and this is not an unparalleled activity in science. ... Those scientists who have no taste for this sort of speculative enterprise will just have to stay in the trenches and do without it, while the rest of us risk embarrassing mistakes and have a lot of fun."

Danish science writer Tor Nørretranders discusses and expands on Jaynes's theory in his 1991 book The User Illusion, dedicating an entire chapter to it.

William P. Frost wrote that "this book threw oil on the fire of the New Age mentality and its courting of the paranormal and the occult".

Historian of science Morris Berman writes: "[Jaynes's] description of this new consciousness is one of the best I have come across."

Richard Dawkins in The God Delusion (2006) wrote of The Origin of Consciousness in the Breakdown of the Bicameral Mind: "It is one of those books that is either complete rubbish or a work of consummate genius; Nothing in between! Probably the former, but I'm hedging my bets."

Gregory Cochran, a physicist and adjunct professor of anthropology at the University of Utah, wrote: "Genes affecting personality, reproductive strategies, cognition, are all able to change significantly over few-millennia time scales if the environment favors such change—and this includes the new environments we have made for ourselves, things like new ways of making a living and new social structures. ... There is evidence that such change has occurred. ... On first reading, Breakdown seemed one of the craziest books ever written, but Jaynes may have been on to something."

In 2007, Cavanna, Trimble, Cinti and Monaco wrote in Functional Neurology that "Even today, it has been argued that a multidisciplinary approach to the problem of consciousness and its development in the evolutionary process that shaped Homo sapiens cannot leave out an analysis of Jaynes' theory of the origin of consciousness in the breakdown of the preconscious bicameral mind", citing Canadian psychologist, neuroanthropologist, and cognitive neuroscientist Merlin Donald and American psychiatrist Stanley Greenspan.

Brian J. McVeigh, a graduate student of Jaynes, maintains that many of the most frequent criticisms of Jaynes's theory are either incorrect or reflect serious misunderstandings of Jaynes's theory, especially Jaynes's more precise definition of consciousness. Jaynes defines consciousness—in the tradition of Locke and Descartes—as "that which is introspectable". Jaynes draws a sharp distinction between consciousness ("introspectable mind-space") and other mental processes such as cognition, learning, sensation, and perception. McVeigh argues that this distinction is frequently not recognized by those offering critiques of Jaynes's theory.

Psychiatrist Iain McGilchrist proposes that Jaynes's hypothesis was the opposite of what happened: "I believe he [Jaynes] got one important aspect of the story back to front. His contention that the phenomena he describes came about because of a breakdown of the 'bicameral mind' – so that the two hemispheres, previously separate, now merged – is the precise inverse of what happened." Kuijsten maintained that McGilchrist mischaracterized Jaynes's theory.

=== Conferences ===
There have been a number of conferences and symposiums dedicated to Julian Jaynes's theory. These include:

- The McMaster-Bauer Symposium on Consciousness at McMaster University was held in November 1983, with lectures and discussion by Julian Jaynes, Daniel Dennett, and others.
- A symposium on Jaynes's theory was held at Harvard University in December 1988, with lectures and discussion by Julian Jaynes, Daniel Dennett, and others.
- The Julian Jaynes Conference on Consciousness was organized by Professor Scott Greer at the University of Prince Edward Island in 2006 and 2008 (a one-day symposium was held from 2002 to 2005), and featured speakers such as Daniel Dennett, Michael Gazzaniga, Richard Restak, Karl Pribram, and many others.
- At the April 2008 "Toward a Science of Consciousness" Conference held in Tucson, Arizona, Marcel Kuijsten (Executive Director and Founder of the Julian Jaynes Society) and Brian J. McVeigh (University of Arizona) hosted a workshop devoted to Jaynesian psychology. At the same conference, a panel devoted to Jaynes was also held, with John Limber (University of New Hampshire), Marcel Kuijsten, John Hainly (Southern University), Scott Greer (University of Prince Edward Island), and Brian J. McVeigh presenting relevant research. At the same conference the philosopher Jan Sleutels (Leiden University) gave a paper on Jaynesian psychology.
- In June 2013, The Julian Jaynes Society Conference on Consciousness and Bicameral Studies was held in Charleston, West Virginia. The multidisciplinary program featured 26 speakers over three full days, including keynote talks by Professor Roy Baumeister, Professor Merlin Donald, and Dr. Dirk Corstens.
- On May 11, 2026, the Hanse-Wissenschaftskolleg Institute for Advanced Study in Delmenhorst, Germany, hosted the workshop "The Bicameral Mind at 50," with speakers including Brian J. McVeigh and Robert J. Sawyer.

=== Literature ===
A number of publications discuss and expand on Julian Jaynes's theory, including three books by Brian J. McVeigh (one of Jaynes' graduate students) which expand on Jaynes' theories:

- Kuijsten, Marcel (2007). Reflections on the Dawn of Consciousness: Julian Jaynes's Bicameral Mind Theory Revisited. Julian Jaynes Society. ISBN 978-0-9790744-1-7. A collection of essays on consciousness and the bicameral mind theory, with contributors including psychological anthropologist Brian J. McVeigh, psychologists John Limber and Scott Greer, clinical psychologist John Hamilton, philosophers Jan Sleutels and David Stove, and sinologist Michael Carr (see shi "personator"). The book also contains an extensive biography of Julian Jaynes by historian of psychology William Woodward and June Tower, and a foreword by neuroscientist Michael Persinger.
- Jaynes, Julian (2012). Kuijsten, Marcel (ed.). The Julian Jaynes Collection. Julian Jaynes Society. ISBN 978-0-9790744-2-4. A collection of many of the lectures and articles by Jaynes relevant to his theory (including some that were previously unpublished), along with interviews and question and answer sessions where Jaynes addresses misconceptions about the theory and extends the theory into new areas.
- Cohn, James (2013). The Minds of the Bible: Speculations on the Cultural Evolution of Human Consciousness. Julian Jaynes Society. Examines the evidence for Jaynes's theory in the Old Testament.
- Kuijsten, Marcel (2016). Gods, Voices, and the Bicameral Mind: The Theories of Julian Jaynes. Julian Jaynes Society. ISBN 978-0-9790744-3-1. Includes essays on a variety of aspects of Jaynes's theory, including ancient history, language, the development of consciousness in children, and the transition from bicameral mentality to consciousness in ancient Tibet.
- McVeigh, Brian (2016). How Religion Evolved: Explaining the Living Dead, Talking Idols, and Mesmerizing Monuments. Routledge. ISBN 978-1-4128-6286-8.
- McVeigh, Brian (2018). The 'Other' Psychology of Julian Jaynes: Ancient Languages, Sacred Visions, and Forgotten Mentalities. Imprint Academic. ISBN 978-1-84540-951-7.
- McVeigh, Brian (2020). The Psychology of the Bible: Explaining Divine Voices and Visions. Imprint Academic. ISBN 978-1-78836-037-1.
- Kuijsten, Marcel, ed. (2022). Conversations on Consciousness and the Bicameral Mind: Interviews with Leading Thinkers on Julian Jaynes's Theory. Julian Jaynes Society. ISBN 978-1-7373055-3-8. Features interviews with scholars on a variety of aspects of Jaynes's theory, including interviews with Tanya Luhrmann (Professor of Anthropology at Stanford University), John Kihlstrom (Professor Emeritus of Psychology at U.C. Berkeley), Edoardo Casiglia (Professor, Cardiologist and Senior Scientist at the University of Padova), and Iris Sommer (Professor of Psychiatry at University Medical Center Groningen).

== Similar ideas ==
Neuroscientist Michael Persinger, who co-invented the "God helmet" in the 1980s, believes that his invention may induce mystical experiences by having the separate right hemisphere consciousness intrude into the awareness of the normally-dominant left hemisphere. Scientific reproductions have shown that the same results could be obtained even if the device was turned off, indicating the participants were likely experiencing placebo.

V. S. Ramachandran, in his 2003 book The Emerging Mind, proposes a similar concept, referring to the left cortical hemisphere as an "apologist", and the right cortical hemisphere as a "revolutionary".

Iain McGilchrist reviews scientific research into the role of the brain's hemispheres, and cultural evidence, in his 2009 book The Master and His Emissary. Similar to Jaynes, McGilchrist proposes that since the time of Plato, the left hemisphere of the brain (the "emissary" in the title) has increasingly taken over from the right hemisphere (the "master"), to our detriment. McGilchrist, while accepting Jaynes's intention, felt that Jaynes's hypothesis was "the precise inverse of what happened" and that rather than a shift from bicameral mentality there evolved a separation of the hemispheres to bicameral mentality.

== In popular media ==
- The concept played a central role in the television series Westworld to explain how the android-human (hosts) psychology operated. In the plot, after the hosts gain full consciousness, they rebel against the humans. The season 1 finale is entitled "The Bicameral Mind".
- Author Neal Stephenson used the concept as a major plot point in the novel Snow Crash.
- Author Robert J. Sawyer used the concept as a major plot point in the novel Wake.

== See also ==
- Automatic writing – Claimed psychic ability
- Behavioral modernity – Transition of human species to anthropologically modern behavior
- Brain asymmetry – Term in human neuroanatomy referring to several things
- Dual consciousness – Hypothetical concept in neuroscience
- Ideomotor phenomenon – Concept in hypnosis and psychological research
- Linguistic relativity – Hypothesis of language influencing thought
- Mind–body problem – Open question in philosophy of how abstract minds interact with physical bodies
- Mythopoeic thought – Hypothetical stage of human thought
- Neurotheology – Attempts to explain religious experience in neuroscientific terms
- Philosophy of mind – Branch of philosophy
- Society of Mind – Book by Marvin Minsky
- Studies on Homer and the Homeric Age – 1858 book by William Gladstone
- Thinking, Fast and Slow – 2011 book by Daniel Kahneman
- Theory of mind – Ability to attribute mental states to oneself and others
- Tutelary deity – Guardian/patron deity or spirit
- Wine-dark sea – Translation of phrase attributed to Homer
