= The Origin of Consciousness in the Breakdown of the Bicameral Mind =

1976 book by Julian Jaynes

- Author: Julian Jaynes
- Language: English
- Subject: Consciousness
- Publisher: Houghton Mifflin, Mariner Books
- Publication date: 1976
- Publication place: United States
- Media type: Print (Hardcover, Paperback, Digital)
- Pages: 512 (English edition)
- ISBN: 978-0618057078

The Origin of Consciousness in the Breakdown of the Bicameral Mind is a 1976 book by the Princeton psychologist, psychohistorian (Note: In this context, the term refers to the history of the mind without the usual connotation of "psychohistory" in reference to psychoanalysis.) and consciousness theorist Julian Jaynes (1920–1997). It explores the nature of consciousness – particularly "the ability to introspect" – and its evolution in ancient human history. Jaynes proposes that consciousness is a learned behavior rooted in language and culture rather than being innate. He distinguishes consciousness from sensory awareness and cognition. Jaynes introduces the concept of the "bicameral mind", a non-conscious mentality prevalent in early humans that relied on auditory hallucinations.

In his book, Jaynes examines historical texts and archaeological evidence to support his theory. He places the origin of consciousness around the 2nd millennium BC and suggests that the transition from the bicameral mind to consciousness was triggered by the breakdown of the bicameral system. The bicameral mind, he explains, was characterized by individuals experiencing auditory hallucinations as commands from gods, guiding their actions.

The book gained attention and was well-received upon its release. It generated several positive book reviews, including mentions by notable critics such as John Updike and Christopher Lehmann-Haupt. The theory proposed by Jaynes influenced philosophers like Daniel Dennett and Susan Blackmore, as well as researchers studying schizophrenia. Jaynes's ideas on consciousness and the bicameral mind have been explored in various conferences, publications, and discussions over the years.

In addition to numerous reviews and commentaries, there are several summaries of the book's material, for example, in the journal Behavioral and Brain Sciences, and in lectures and discussions published in Canadian Psychology. It was Jaynes's only book, and is still in print in several languages.

== Bicameral mind ==
In this book, Jaynes reviews what one of his early critics acknowledged as the "spectacular history of failure" to explain consciousness – "the human ability to introspect". Abandoning the assumption that consciousness is innate, Jaynes explains it instead as a learned behavior that "arises [...] from language, and specifically from metaphor." With this understanding, Jaynes then demonstrated that ancient texts and archeology can reveal a history of human mentality alongside the histories of other cultural products. His analysis of the evidence led him not only to place the origin of consciousness during the 2nd millennium BC but also to hypothesize the existence of an older non-conscious "mentality that he called the bicameral mind, referring to the brain's two hemispheres".

== Contents ==
The book is divided into three parts, designated as "Books". Book I, titled "The Mind of Man", discusses consciousness, and raises the question of precisely when in history man may have become conscious of his own consciousness. It makes observations about Homer's Iliad, and proposes the hypothesis of a bicameral mind, linking it to the origin of civilization.

Book II, titled "The Witness of History", applied this hypothesis to Neolithic culture and the rise of the Mesopotamian and Greek civilizations. Book III, titled "Vestiges of the Bicameral Mind in the Modern World", applies the hypothesis to modern psychological theories of authority, prophecy, possession, poetry, music, hypnosis, and schizophrenia.

== Reception and influence ==
The Origin of Consciousness in the Breakdown of the Bicameral Mind was a successful work of popular science, selling out the first print run before a second could replace it. It received some positive book reviews, such as those by John Updike in The New Yorker, Christopher Lehmann-Haupt in the New York Times, and Marshall McLuhan in the Toronto Globe and Mail. Articles on Jaynes and his ideas appeared in Time and Psychology Today in 1977, and in Quest/78 in 1978. The book was nominated for the National Book Award in Contemporary Thought in 1978.

A new edition, with an afterword that addressed some criticisms and restated the main themes, was published in the United States in 1990 and in the United Kingdom (by Penguin Books) in 1993, and was re-issued in 2000.

The book is mentioned in Richard Dawkins's 2006 work The God Delusion as "one of those books that is either complete rubbish or a work of consummate genius, nothing in between! Probably the former, but I'm hedging my bets." Jaynes's work on consciousness has influenced philosophers Daniel Dennett, Susan Blackmore, and Ken Wilber, and the bicameral model of the cerebral hemispheres has influenced schizophrenia researchers Henry Nasrallah and Tim Crow.

The theory of bicamerality inspired early investigations of auditory hallucination by psychologist Thomas Posey and clinical psychologist John Hamilton. With further research in the late 1990s using new brain imaging technology, Jaynes's ideas have received renewed attention and recognition for contributing to a rethinking of auditory hallucinations and mental illness.

Jaynes described the range of responses to his book as "from people who feel [the ideas are] very important all the way to very strong hostility. ... When someone comes along and says consciousness is in history, it can't be accepted. If [psychologists] did accept it, they wouldn't have the motivation to go back into the laboratory ..."

Marcel Kuijsten, founder of the Julian Jaynes Society, wrote that in the decades since the book's publication, "there have been few in-depth discussions, either positive or negative" about it, rejecting as too simplistic the criticism that "Jaynes was wrong."

== Editions and translations ==
- Jaynes, Julian (1976). The Origin of Consciousness in the Breakdown of the Bicameral Mind (1st ed.). Boston: Houghton Mifflin. ISBN 978-0395329320.
- ——— (1990) [1976]. The Origin of Consciousness in the Breakdown of the Bicameral Mind (2nd ed.). Boston: Houghton Mifflin. ISBN 9780395563526.
- ——— (1993) [1990]. The Origin of Consciousness in the Breakdown of the Bicameral Mind (2nd ed.). Penguin Books. ISBN 978-0140174915.
- ——— (2000) [1990]. The Origin of Consciousness in the Breakdown of the Bicameral Mind (Reprint ed.). Boston: Houghton Mifflin. ISBN 9780547527543.

The Origin of Consciousness in the Breakdown of the Bicameral Mind has been translated into at least seven foreign languages.

== In popular culture ==
The message "Your bicameral mind / Mind your bicameral" is written on the run-out groove of the single vinyl for the David Bowie song "Boys Keep Swinging" (1979).

The concept played a central role in the television series Westworld (2016–2022) to explain how the android-human (hosts) psychology operated. In the plot, after the hosts gain full consciousness, they rebel against the humans. The Season 1 finale is entitled "The Bicameral Mind" (2016).

== See also ==
For other claims and analysis of Homer's Iliad and Odyssey, see:

- Studies on Homer and the Homeric Age
- Wine-dark sea
