= Color of water =

Water color in different conditions

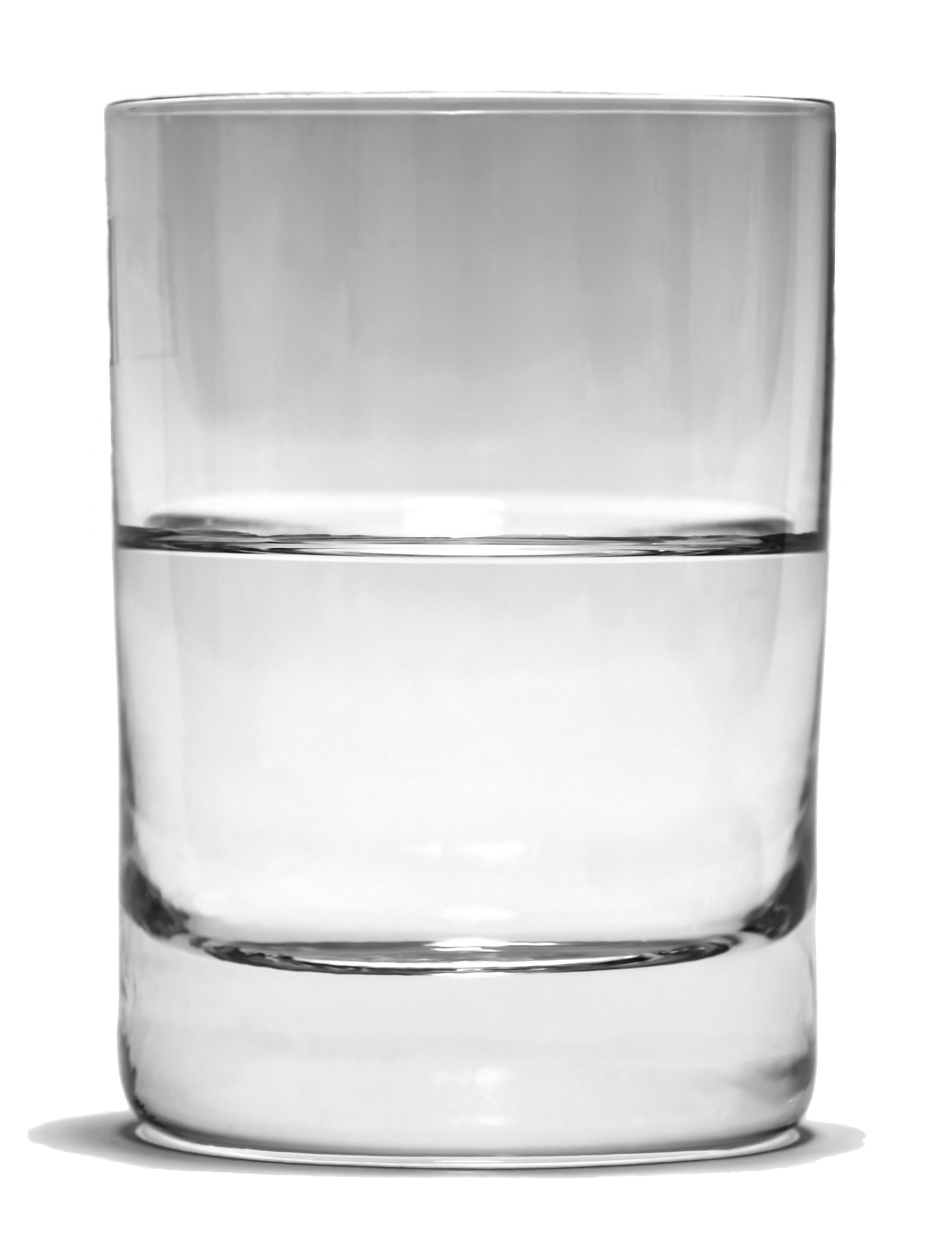
When water is in small quantities (e.g. in a glass) it appears colorless to the human eye.

The color of water varies with the ambient conditions in which that water is present. While relatively small quantities of water appear to be colorless and transparent, pure water has a slight blue color that becomes deeper as the thickness of the observed sample increases. The hue of water is an intrinsic property and is caused by selective absorption and scattering of blue light. Dissolved elements or suspended impurities may give water a different color.

== Intrinsic color ==
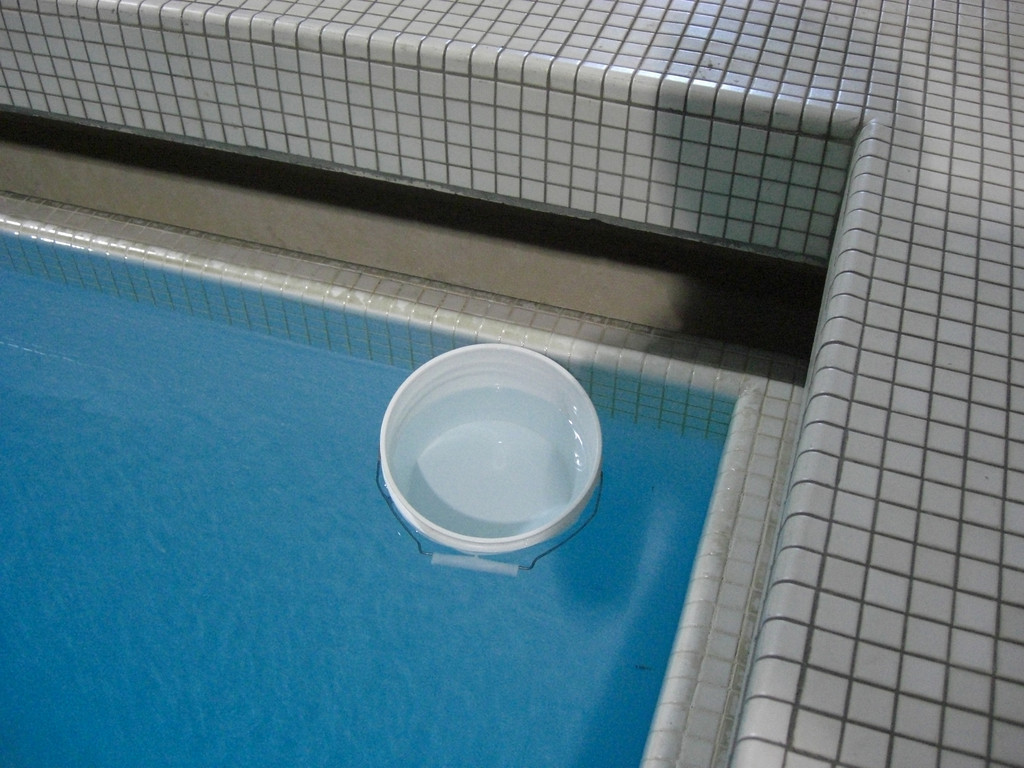
An indoor swimming pool appears sky blue from above, as light reflecting from the bottom of the pool travels through enough water that its red component is absorbed. The same water in a smaller bucket looks only slightly sky blue, and observing the water at close range makes it appear colorless to the naked eye.

The intrinsic color of liquid water may be demonstrated by looking at a white light source through a long pipe that is filled with purified water and closed at both ends with a transparent window. The light sky blue color is caused by weak absorption in the red part of the visible spectrum.

Absorptions in the visible spectrum are usually attributed to excitations of electronic energy states in matter. Water is a simple three-atom molecule, H_{2}O, and all its electronic absorptions occur in the ultraviolet region of the electromagnetic spectrum and are therefore not responsible for the color of water in the visible region of the spectrum. The water molecule has three fundamental modes of vibration. Two stretching vibrations of the O–H bonds in the gaseous state of water occur at v_{1} = 3650 cm^{−1} and v_{3} = 3755 cm^{−1}. Absorption due to these vibrations occurs in the infrared region of the spectrum. The absorption in the visible spectrum is due mainly to the harmonic v_{1} + 3v_{3} = 14,318 cm^{−1}, which is equivalent to a wavelength of 698 nm. In liquid state at 20 °C (68 °F) these vibrations are red-shifted by hydrogen bonding, resulting in red absorption at 740 nm, other harmonics such as v_{1} + v_{2} + 3v_{3} giving red absorption at 660 nm. The absorption curve for heavy water (D_{2}O) is of a similar shape, but is shifted further towards the infrared end of the spectrum, because the vibrational transitions have a lower energy. For this reason, heavy water does not absorb red light and thus large bodies of D_{2}O would lack the characteristic sky blue of the more commonly found light water (^{1}H_{2}O).

Absorption intensity decreases markedly with each successive overtone, resulting in very weak absorption for the third overtone. For this reason, the pipe needs to have a length of a meter or more and the water must be purified by microfiltration to remove any particles that could produce Mie scattering.

== Color of lakes and oceans ==
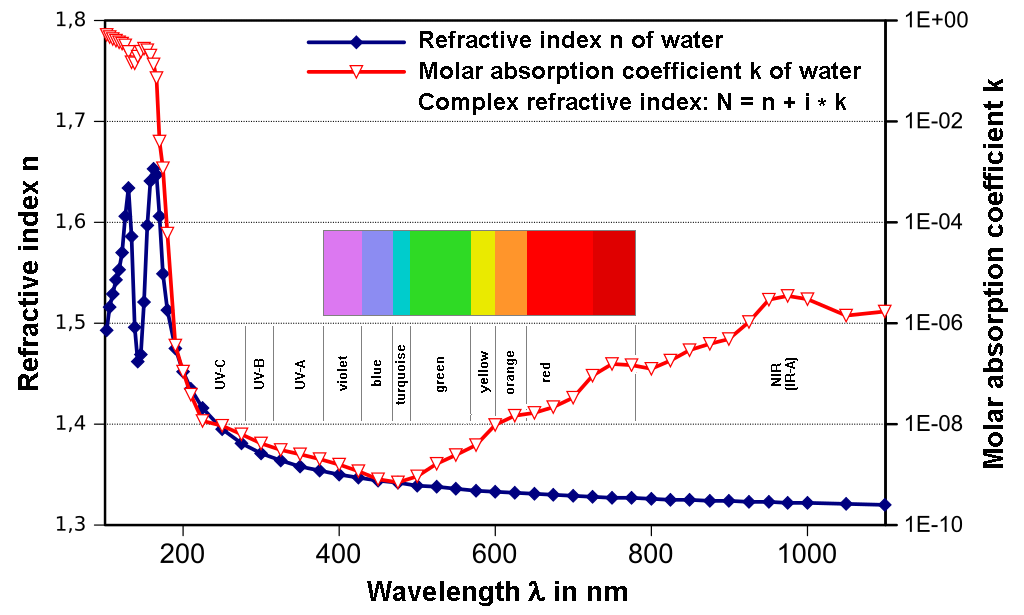
Refraction and absorbance of water in the wavelength range of about 110 nm to 1100 nm

Lakes and oceans appear cyan for several reasons. One is that the surface of the water reflects the color of the sky, which ranges from cyan to light azure. It is a common misconception that this reflection is the sole reason bodies of water appear cyan, though it can contribute. This contribution usually makes the body of water appear more a shade of azure rather than cyan depending on how bright the sky is. Water in swimming pools with white-painted sides and bottom will appear cyan, even in indoor pools where there is no sky to be reflected. The deeper the pool, the more intense the cyan color becomes.

Some of the light hitting the surface of the ocean is reflected but most of it penetrates the water surface, interacting with water molecules and other substances in the water. Water molecules can vibrate in three different modes when they interact with light. The red, orange, and yellow wavelengths of light are absorbed so the remaining light seen is composed of green, cyan, and blue wavelengths. This is the main reason the ocean's color is cyan. The relative contribution of reflected skylight and the light scattered back from the depths is strongly dependent on observation angle.

Scattering from suspended particles also plays an important role in the color of lakes and oceans, causing the water to look greener or bluer in different areas. A few tens of meters of water will absorb all light, so without scattering, all bodies of water would appear black. Because most lakes and oceans contain suspended living matter and mineral particles, light from above is scattered and some of it is reflected upwards. Scattering from suspended particles would normally give a white color, as with snow, but because the light first passes through many meters of cyan-colored liquid, the scattered light appears cyan. In extremely pure water—as is found in mountain lakes, where scattering from particles is very low—the scattering from water molecules themselves also contributes a cyan color.

Diffuse sky radiation due to Rayleigh scattering in the atmosphere along one's line of sight gives distant objects a cyan or light azure tint. This is most commonly noticed with distant mountains, but also contributes to the cyanness of the ocean in the distance.

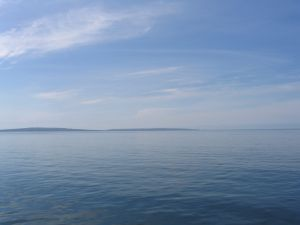
Large bodies of water such as oceans manifest water's inherent blue color.

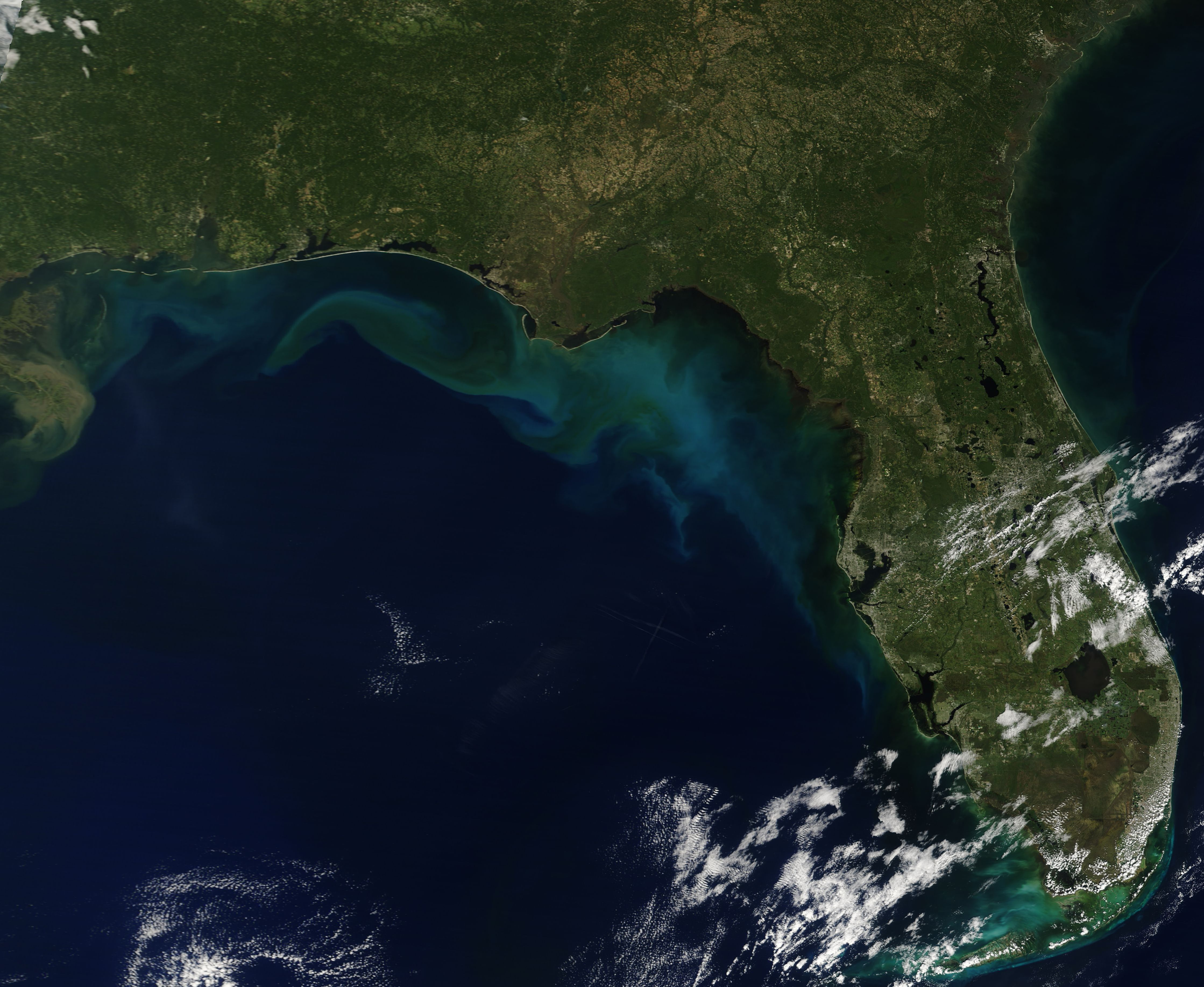
From space, oceans appear to have a very rich, deep shade of blue. This is an image taken by the MODIS instruments of the Gulf of Mexico.

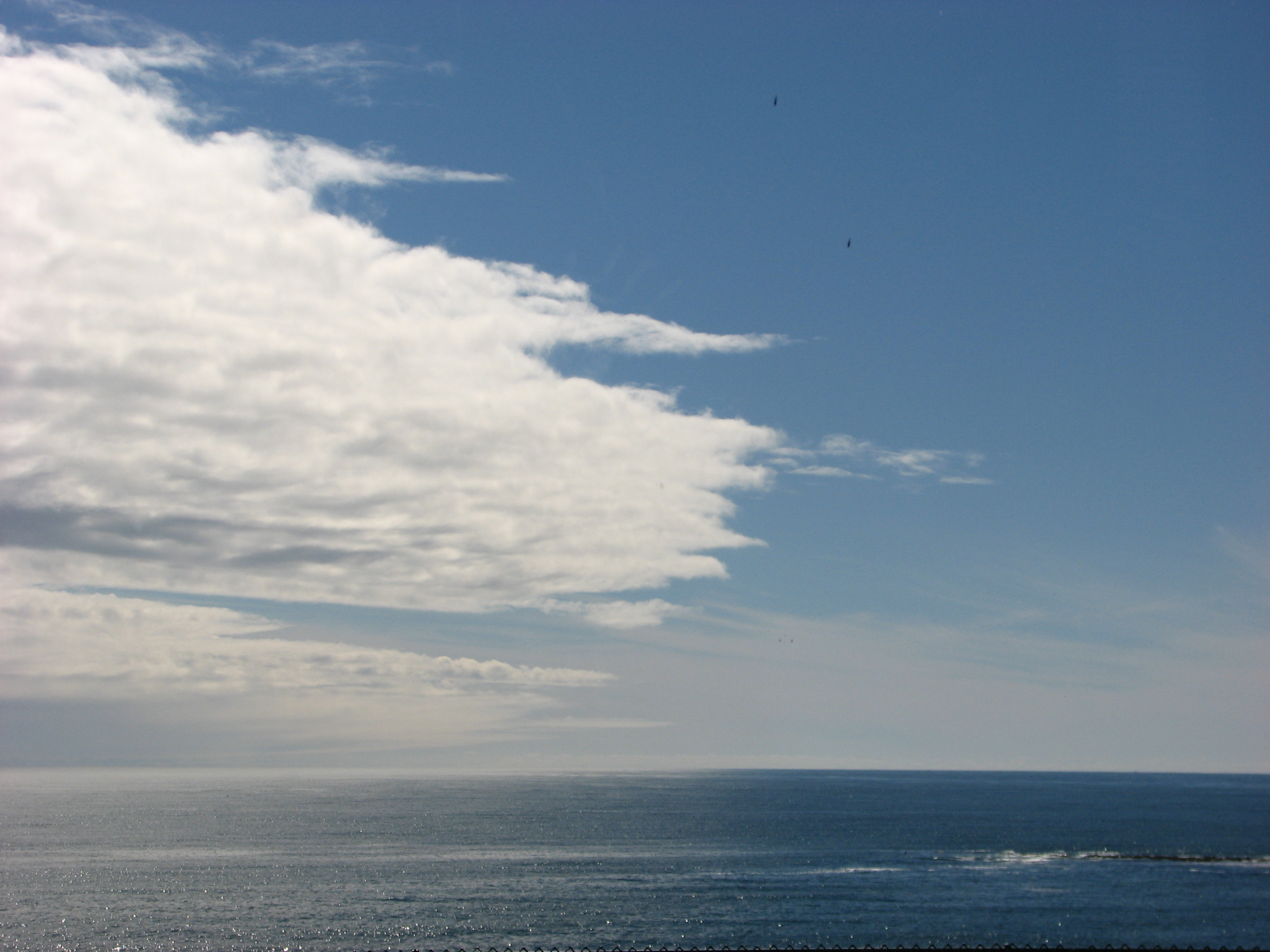
The hue of the reflected sky contributes to the perceived azure color of water, but most of the cyan color comes from the intrinsic color of water scattered back up to the surface by small suspended particles.

== Color of glaciers ==
Glaciers are large bodies of ice and snow formed in cold climates by processes involving the compaction of fallen snow. While snowy glaciers appear white from a distance, the long path lengths of internal reflected light causes glaciers to appear a deep blue when viewed up close and when shielded from direct ambient light.

Relatively small amounts of regular ice appear white because plenty of air bubbles are present, and also because small quantities of water appear to be colorless. In glaciers, on the other hand, the pressure causes the air bubbles, trapped in the accumulated snow, to be squeezed out increasing the density of the created ice. Large quantities of water appear cyan, therefore a large piece of compressed ice, or a glacier, would also appear cyan.

== Color of water samples ==
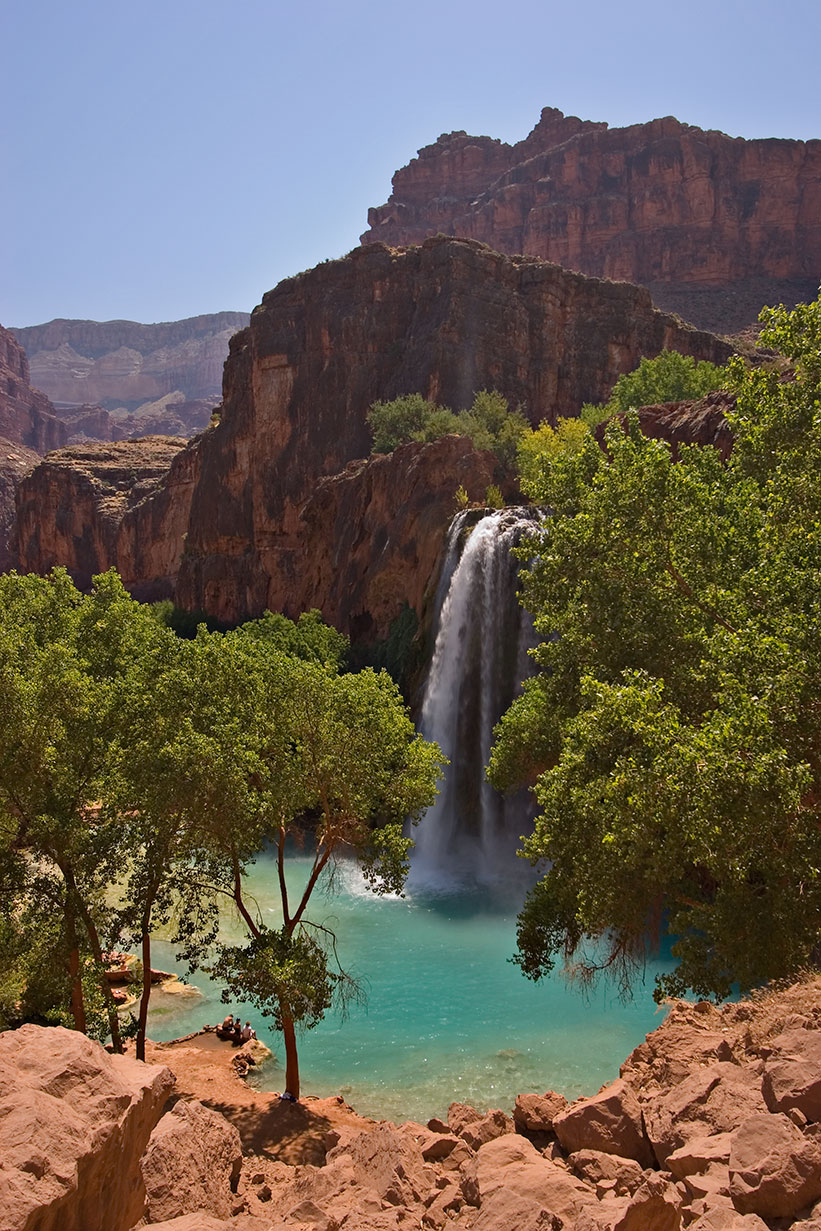
High concentrations of dissolved lime give the water of Havasu Falls a cyan color.

Dissolved and particulate material in water can cause it to appear more green, tan, brown, or red. For instance, dissolved organic compounds called tannins can result in dark brown colors, or algae floating in the water (particles) can impart a green color. Color variations can be measured with reference to a standard color scale. Two examples of standard color scales for natural water bodies are the Forel-Ule scale and the Platinum-Cobalt scale. For example, slight discoloration is measured against the Platinum-Cobalt scale in Hazen units (HU).

The color of a water sample can be reported as:

- Apparent color is the color of a body of water being reflected from the surface of the water, and consists of color from both dissolved and suspended components. Apparent color may also be changed by variations in sky color or the reflection of nearby vegetation.
- True color is measured after a sample of water has been collected and purified (either by centrifuging or filtration). Pure water tends to look sky blue in color and a sample can be compared to pure water with a predetermined color standard or comparing the results of a spectrophotometer.

Testing for color can be a quick and easy test which often reflects the amount of organic material in the water, although certain inorganic components like iron or manganese can also impart color.

Water color can reveal physical, chemical and bacteriological conditions. In drinking water, green can indicate copper leaching from copper plumbing and can also represent algae growth. Blue can also indicate copper, or might be caused by syphoning of industrial cleaners in the tank of commodes, commonly known as backflowing. Reds can be signs of rust from iron pipes or airborne bacteria from lakes, etc. Black water can indicate growth of sulfur-reducing bacteria inside a hot water tank set to too low a temperature. This usually has a strong sulfur or rotten egg (H_{2}S) odor and is easily corrected by draining the water heater and increasing the temperature to 49 °C (120 °F) or higher. Sulfate reducing bacteria are not known to cause issues in cold water plumbing. Learning the water impurity indication color spectrum can make identifying and solving cosmetic, bacteriological and chemical problems easier.

== Water quality and color ==
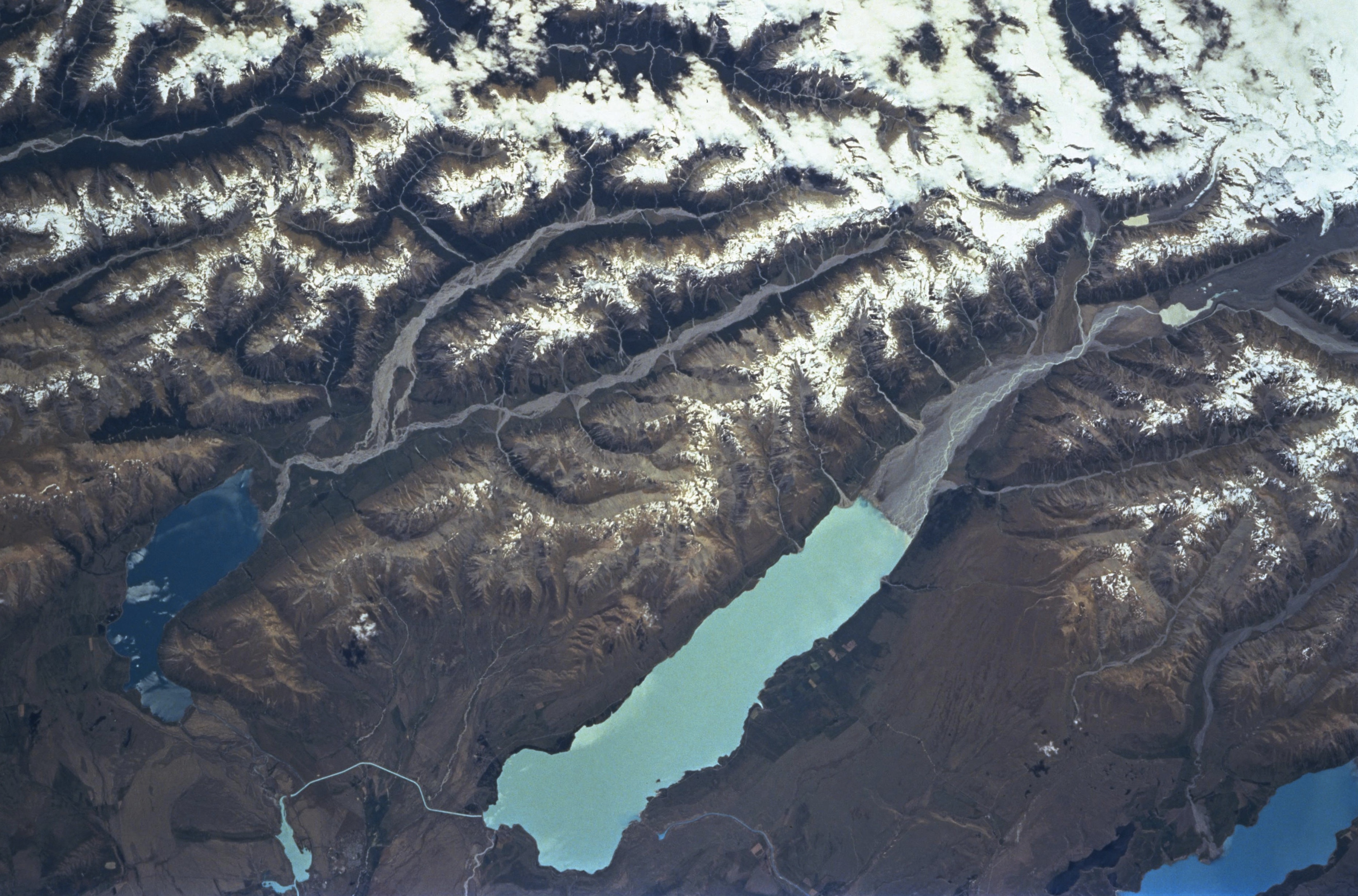
Glacial rock flour makes New Zealand's Lake Pukaki a lighter turquoise than its neighbors.

The presence of color in water does not necessarily indicate that the water is not drinkable. Water with high water clarity is generally more cyan in color due to low concentrations of particles and/or dissolved substances. Color-causing particulate substances can be easily removed by filtration. Color-causing dissolved substances such as tannins are only toxic to animals in large concentration.

Color from dissolved substances is not removed by typical water filters; however the use of coagulants may succeed in trapping the color-causing compounds within the resulting precipitate. Other factors can affect the color seen:

- Particles and solutes can absorb light, as in tea or coffee. Green algae in rivers and streams often lend a blue-green color. The Red Sea has occasional blooms of red Trichodesmium erythraeum algae.
- Particles in water can scatter light. The Colorado River is often muddy red because of suspended reddish silt in the water—this gives the river its name, from Spanish colorado, 'colored, red'. Some mountain lakes and streams with finely ground rock, such as glacial flour, are turquoise. Light scattering by suspended matter is required in order that the blue light produced by water's absorption can return to the surface and be observed. Such scattering can also shift the spectrum of the emerging photons toward the green, a color often seen when water laden with suspended particles is observed.

== Color names ==
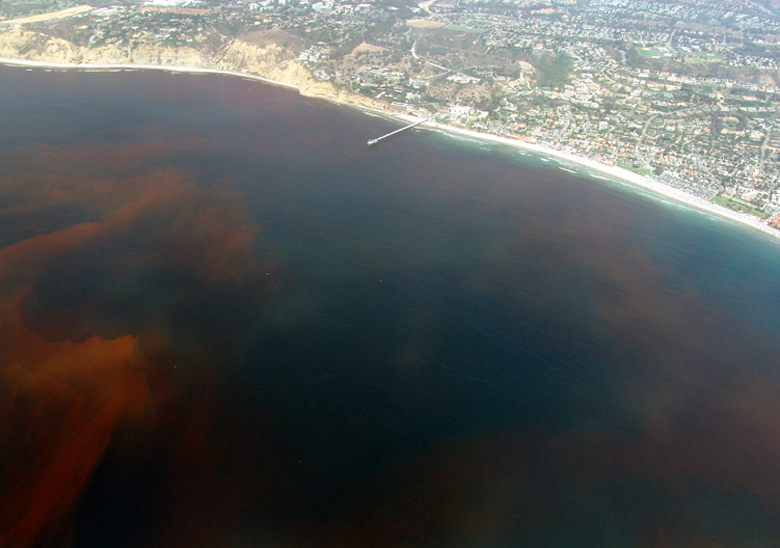
Red tide off the California coast

Various cultures divide the semantic field of colors differently from the English language usage, and some do not distinguish between blue and green in the same way. An example is Welsh in which glas can mean blue or green, or Vietnamese in which xanh likewise can mean either. Conversely, in Russian and some other languages, there is no single word for blue, but different words for light blue (голубой, goluboy) and dark blue (синий, siniy).

Other color names assigned to bodies of water are sea green and ultramarine blue. Unusual oceanic colorings have given rise to the terms red tide and black tide.

The Ancient Greek poet Homer uses the epithet "wine-dark sea"; in addition, he also describes the sea as "grey". William Ewart Gladstone has suggested that this is due to the Ancient Greek classifying colors primarily by luminosity rather than hue, while others presume Homer was color blind (but note that Homer is often considered to have been blind).
