= Egg oil =

Oil derived from yolk of chicken eggs

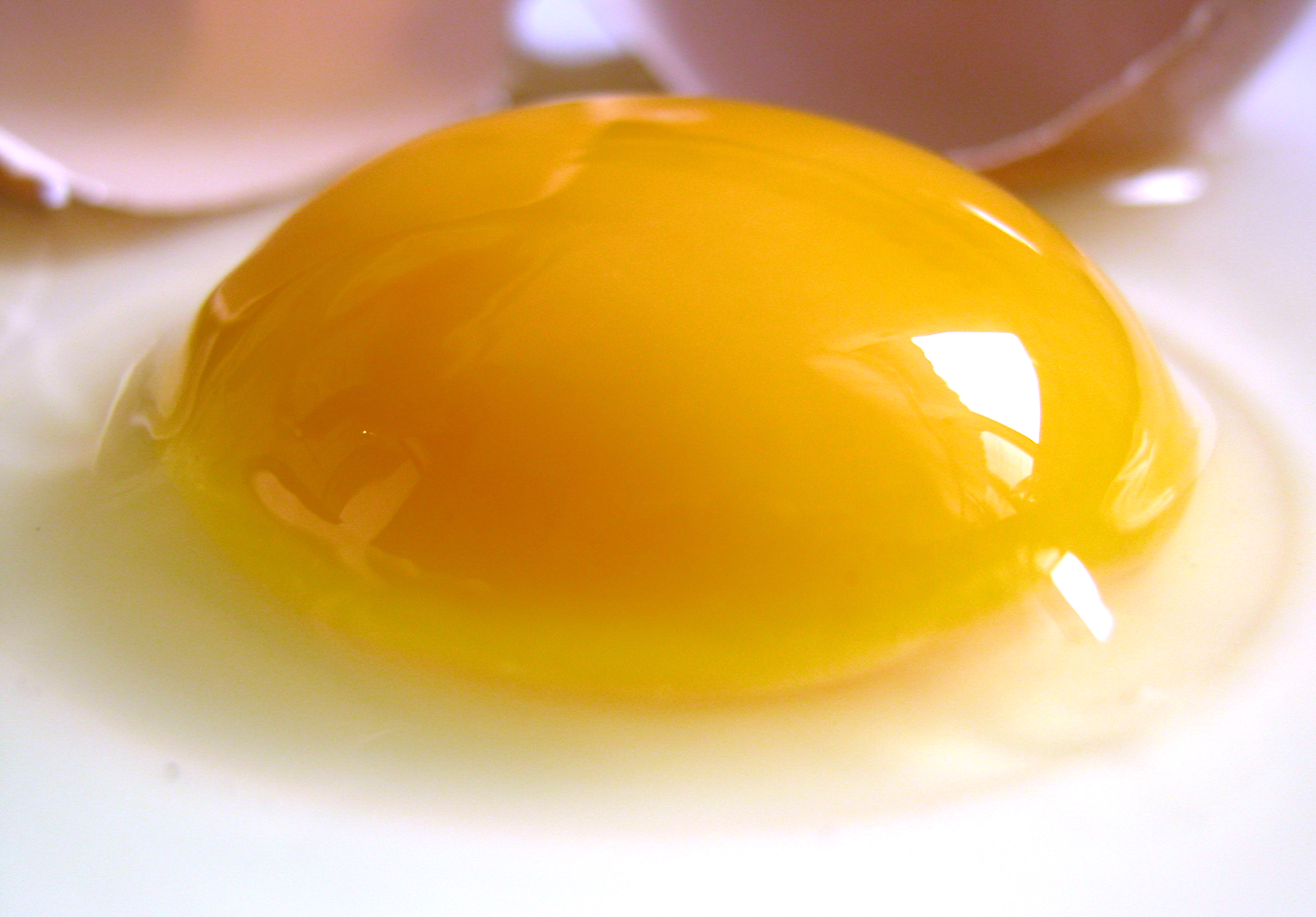
An intact yolk surrounded by egg white

Egg oil (CAS No. 8001–17–0, INCI: egg oil), also known as egg yolk oil or ovum oil, is derived from the yolk of chicken eggs consisting mainly of triglycerides with traces of lecithin, cholesterol, biotin, xanthophylls lutein and zeaxanthin, and immunoglobulins. It is free of egg proteins and hence may be used safely by people who are allergic to eggs, for topical applications such as hair and skin care. The product has several historical references in Unani (Greek) medicine for hair care. Traditional Chinese medicine uses egg oil for burns, eczema, dermatitis, mouth ulcers, skin ulcers, chapped nipples, tinea capitis, ringworm, nasal vestibulitis, frostbite, and hemorrhoids.

== Production ==
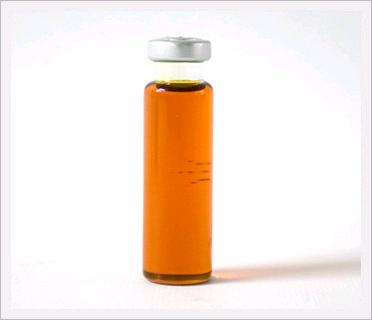
Extracted egg oil

In alchemy, the oil was traditionally extracted from the yolk by a fairly simple process, by which fifty eggs yielded approximately five ounces of oil. Modern methods of production include liquid–liquid extraction using common solvents such as hexane, petroleum ether, chloroform, and ethanol. Unlike traditional egg oil produced by heat, solvent extracted product also contains immunoglobulins, which are destroyed at higher temperatures. There are only a few commercial producers globally.

== Composition ==
The fatty acid composition of egg oil is rich in long-chain polyunsaturated fatty acids (LCPUFA) such as omega-3 fatty acids (including docosahexaenoic acid) and omega-6 fatty acids (including arachidonic acid), and closely resembles the fatty acid profile of human milk, as well as the lipid profile of human skin.

=== Complete fatty acid profile ===
Oleic acid (18:1)	37.6%
Palmitic acid (16:0)	35.7%
Linoleic acid (18:2)	10.7%
Palmitoleic acid (16:1)	7.7%
Stearic acid (18:0)	3.3%
Myristic acid (14:0)	1.1%
Docosahexaenoic acid (22:6)	0.5%
Myristoleic acid (14:1)	0.4%
Heptadecanoic acid (17:0)	0.3%
Arachidonic acid (20:4)	0.2%
Arachidic acid (20:0)	0.2%
Linolenic acid (18:3)	0.1%
Pentadecanoic acid (15:0)	0.1%

=== Typical analysis ===
Appearance	Yellow coloured, hazy liquid
Consistency	Viscous liquid/thickened/Semi-solid at 25 C.
Odour	Mild characteristic odour of egg
Refractive index	1.46 – 1.48
Cholesterol	3% – 4.0%
Specific gravity	0.93 – 0.98@25 deg. C
Gardner color scale	11 Max.
Acid value	< 35.0 (mg KOH/g)
Iodine value	> 60

== Uses ==
=== Cosmetics ===
Egg yolk has been used in traditional cosmetics since the eleventh century in Jewish, Greek, Arab, and Latin cultures. Several popular modern cosmetic brands contain egg oil.

==== Hair care ====
Egg oil is widely used in India for hair care.

==== Skin care ====
Egg oil can be used as an excipient/carrier in a variety of cosmetic preparations such as creams, ointments, sun-screen products, or lotions where it acts as an emollient, moisturizer, anti-oxidant, penetration enhancer, occlusive skin conditioner, and anti-bacterial agent.

=== Pharmaceuticals ===
==== Scabies ====
For treatment of scabies in Spain, oil of egg yolk was used along with oil of castor and roses in ancient Andalusia.

==== Wounds ====
Egg oil was traditionally used in treating wounds and injuries. In the 16th century, Ambroise Paré used a solution of egg yolk, oil of roses, and turpentine for war wounds, an old method that the Romans had discovered 1000 years before him. He published his first book The method of curing wounds caused by arquebus and firearms in 1545.

==== Infant nutrition ====
Egg oil is a potential source of polyunsaturated fatty acids such as docosahexaenoic acid and arachidonic acid for infant nutrition or combined with fish oil for infant formula production. It is also a source of vitamin D.
