= ASTM distillation =

Group of standards

ASTM Distillation refers to a diverse group of different ASTM International standards. These different ASTM standards all use the distillation (volatility) characteristics of the substrate in determining the adherence (or not) of the substrate to the standard.

This distillation is a same of E.F.V

Some examples of ASTM International standards utilizing distillation are:

- D86 Test Method for Distillation of Petroleum Products at Atmospheric Pressure
- ASTM D20-03(2014) Standard Test Method for Distillation of Road Tars
- D1160 Test Method for Distillation of Petroleum Products at Reduced Pressure

ASTM Distillation is a subset of the standards set by the standards organization ASTM International, a voluntary standards development organizations that sets technical standards for materials, products, systems, and services.

== See also ==
- International Organization for Standardization
- Materials property
- Pt/Co scale
- Technical standard
