= Bicameralism (disambiguation) =

Bicameralism may refer to:

- Bicameralism, a form of legislature
- Bicameral mentality, a theory about the development of the human brain
- For bicameral script, see Letter case
