= Homeric psychology =

Study of Ancient Greek culture

Homeric psychology is a field of study with regards to the psychology of ancient Greek culture no later than Mycenaean Greece, around 1700–1200 BCE, during the Homeric epic poems (specifically the Illiad and the Odyssey).

The first scholar to present a theory was Bruno Snell in his 1953 German book. He argued that an ancient Greek person did not have a sense of self, and the Greek culture later "self-realized" or "discovered" what he considered the "modern intellect".

Eric Robertson Dodds in 1951 wrote how ancient Greek thought may have been irrational, relative to his. He posited that the Greeks may have known that a person did things, but the reason was attributed to divine externalities, such as gods and demons.

Julian Jaynes, in 1976, stipulated that Greek consciousness emerged from the use of special words related to cognition. Some of his claims were empirically supported in a 2021 study by psychohistorian Boban Dedović. It compared the word counts of mental language between 34 versions of the Iliad and Odyssey.
