= Gardner color scale =

Scale used to measure the shade of the color yellow

The Gardner Color Scale is a one-dimensional scale used to measure the shade of the color yellow. The Gardner scale and the APHA/Pt-Co/Hazen Color Scale overlap, with the Gardner scale measuring higher concentrations of yellow color and the APHA scale measuring very low levels of yellow color.

== History ==
Colors of transparent liquids have been studied visually since the medieval period. Changes in color can indicate contamination or impurities in the raw materials, process variations, or degradation of products over time.

One dimensional scales for yellowness were created, e.g., Gardner Color Scale and APHA/Pt-Co/Hazen Color Scale. The yellowness of the transparent liquid is determined by pouring the sample into a tube and comparing it to a pre determined and known standard. The standard that the sample falls closest to then becomes the value for the liquid. This procedure isn't extremely accurate due to variations of observers, illumination and to some extent the standards themselves.

Gardner Color can also be measured by a dual beam xenon flash spectrophotometer, for example the UltraScan Pro. Spectrophotometers measure the percent transmittance of the product and automatically calculate and provide the Gardner color number using illuminant C and 2º observer.
