= Yolk =

Part of an egg which feeds the developing embryo

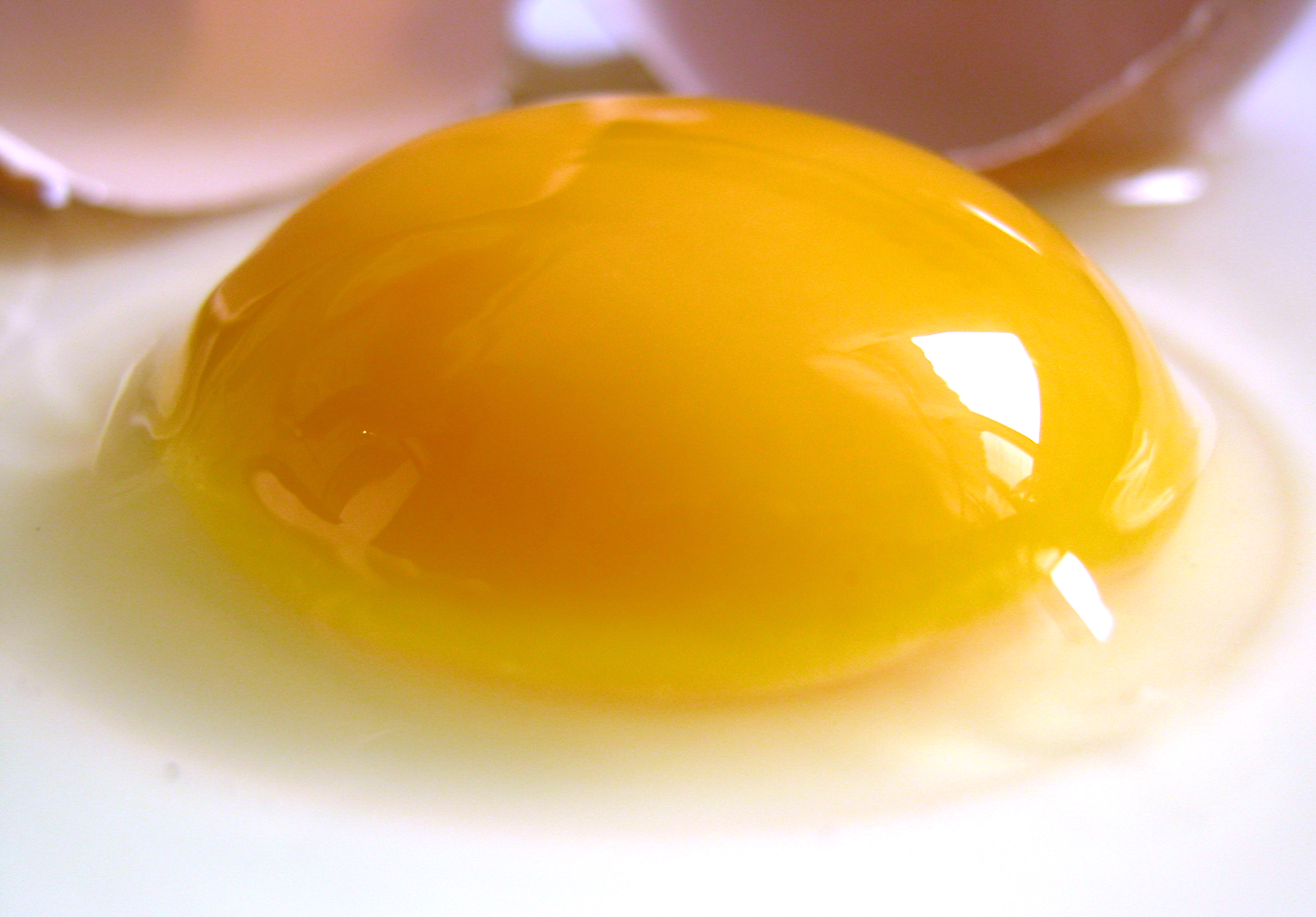
The yolk of a chicken egg

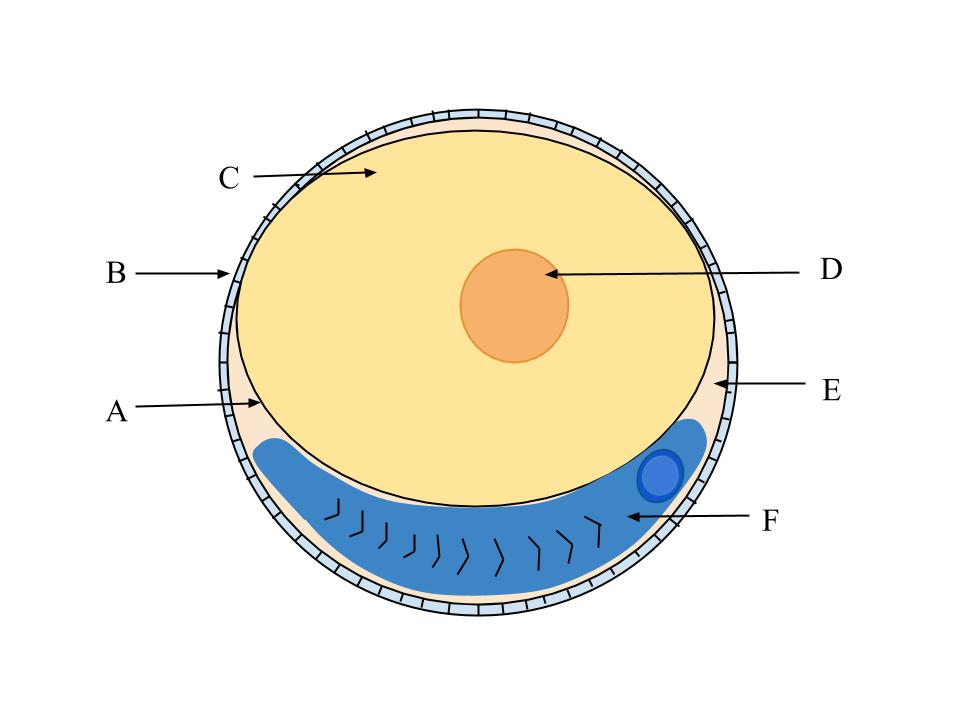
Diagram of a fish egg; the yolk is the area which is marked 'C'

Among animals which produce eggs, the yolk (/ˈjoʊk/; also known as the vitellus) is the nutrient-bearing portion of the egg, the primary function of which is to supply food for the development of the embryo. Some types of egg contain no yolk, for example because they are laid in situations where the food supply is sufficient (such as in the body of the host of a parasitoid) or because the embryo develops in the parent's body, which supplies the food, usually through a placenta. Reproductive systems in which the mother's body supplies the embryo directly are said to be matrotrophic; those in which the embryo is supplied by yolk are said to be lecithotrophic. In many species, such as all birds, and most reptiles and insects, the yolk takes the form of a special storage organ constructed in the reproductive tract of the mother. In many other animals, especially very small species such as some fish and invertebrates, the yolk material is not in a special organ, but inside the egg cell.

As stored food, yolks are often rich in vitamins, minerals, lipids and proteins. The proteins function partly as food in their own right, and partly in regulating the storage and supply of the other nutrients. For example, in some species the amount of yolk in an egg cell affects the developmental processes that follow fertilization.

The yolk is not living cell material like protoplasm, but largely passive material, that is to say deutoplasm. The food material and associated control structures are supplied during oogenesis. Some of the material is stored more or less in the form in which the maternal body supplied it, partly as processed by dedicated non-germ tissues in the egg, while part of the biosynthetic processing into its final form happens in the oocyte itself.

Apart from animals, other organisms, like algae, especially in the oogamous, can also accumulate resources in their female gametes. In gymnosperms, the remains of the female gametophyte serve also as food supply, and in flowering plants, the endosperm.

== Avian egg yolk ==
In avian eggs, the yolk usually is a hue of yellow in color. It is spherical and is suspended in the egg white (known alternatively as albumen or glair/glaire) by one or two spiral bands of tissue called the chalazae.

The yolk mass, together with the ovum proper (after fertilization, the embryo) are enclosed by the vitelline membrane, whose structure is different from a cell membrane. .The yolk is part of the cytoplasm of the egg, occupying more than 90% of it by the time of fertilization in the form of yolk granules. These are composed of lipids, proteins and enzymes, with maternal mRNA and glycogen surrounding them.

After the fertilization, the cleavage of the embryo leads to the formation of the germinal disc.

As food, the chicken egg yolk is a major source of vitamins and minerals. It contains all of the egg's fat and cholesterol, and nearly half of the protein. If left intact when an egg is fried, the yellow yolk surrounded by a flat blob of egg white creates a distinctive "sunny-side up" form. Mixing the two components together before cooking results in a yellow (from pale yellow to almost orange, depending on the breed of hen) mass, as in omelets and scrambled eggs.

=== Uses ===
- The developing embryo inside the egg uses the yolk as sustenance.
- It is at times separated from the egg white for cooking, and is frequently employed as an emulsifier, and is used in mayonnaise, custard, hollandaise sauce, crème brûlée, avgolemono and ovos moles.
- It is used in painting as a component of traditional egg-tempera.
- It is used in European manuscript production as a component of traditional illumination media.
- It is used in the production of egg yolk agar plate medium, useful in testing for the presence of Clostridium perfringens.
- Egg yolk contains an antibody called antiglobulin (IgY). The antibody transfers from the laying hen to the egg yolk by passive immunity to protect both embryo and hatchling from microorganism invasion.
- Egg yolk can be used to make liqueurs such as Advocaat or eggnog.
- Egg yolk is used to extract egg oil which has various cosmetic, nutritional, and medicinal uses.

=== Composition of chicken egg yolk ===
Chicken egg, yolk, raw, fresh
Nutritional value per 100 g (3.5 oz)
- Energy: 1,325 kJ (317 kcal)
- Carbohydrates: 3.59 g
- Fat: 26.54 g
- Protein: 15.86 g
Amino acids
Tryptophan	0.177 g
Threonine	0.687 g
Isoleucine	0.866 g
Leucine	1.399 g
Lysine	1.217 g
Methionine	0.378 g
Cystine	0.264 g
Phenylalanine	0.681 g
Tyrosine	0.678 g
Valine	0.949 g
Arginine	1.099 g
Histidine	0.416 g
Alanine	0.836 g
Aspartic acid	1.550 g
Glutamic acid	0.595 g
Glycine	0.488 g
Proline	0.545 g
Serine	1.326 g
Vitamins and minerals
Vitamins	Quantity %DV^{†}
Vitamin A equiv.	42% 381 μg
Thiamine (B1)	15% 0.176 mg
Riboflavin (B2)	41% 0.528 mg
Pantothenic acid (B5)	60% 2.990 mg
Folate (B9)	37% 146 μg
Choline	149% 820.2 mg
Vitamin D	27% 218 IU
Minerals	Quantity %DV^{†}
Calcium	10% 129 mg
Iron	15% 2.73 mg
Magnesium	1% 5 mg
Phosphorus	31% 390 mg
Potassium	4% 109 mg
Zinc	21% 2.30 mg
- Other constituents: Quantity
- Water: 52.31 g
- Cholesterol: 1085 mg
- One large egg contains 17 grams of yolk.
- ^{†}Percentages estimated using US recommendations for adults, except for potassium, which is estimated based on expert recommendation from the National Academies.

The yolk makes up about 33% of the liquid weight of the egg; it contains about 60 kilocalories (250 kJ), three times the energy content of the egg white. The yolk's high energy density compared to whites is due to yolk's much higher fat content.

All of the fat-soluble vitamins (A, D, E and K) are found in the egg yolk. Egg yolk is one of the few foods naturally containing vitamin D.

The composition (by weight) of the most prevalent fatty acids in egg yolk typically is:

- Unsaturated fatty acids:
  - Oleic acid, 47%
  - Linoleic acid, 16%
  - Palmitoleic acid, 5%
  - Linolenic acid, 2%
- Saturated fatty acids:
  - Palmitic acid, 23%
  - Stearic acid, 4%
  - Myristic acid, 1%

Egg yolk is a source of lecithin, as well as egg oil, for cosmetic and pharmaceutical applications. Based on weight, egg yolk contains about 9% lecithin.

The yellow color is due to lutein and zeaxanthin, which are yellow or orange carotenoids known as xanthophylls.

=== Yolk proteins ===
The different yolk's proteins have distinct roles. Phosvitins are important in sequestering calcium, iron, and other cations for the developing embryo. Phosvitins are one of the most phosphorylated (10%) proteins in nature; the high concentration of phosphate groups provides efficient metal-binding sites in clusters. Lipovitellins are involved in lipid and metal storage, and contain a heterogeneous mixture of about 16% (w/w) noncovalently bound lipid, most being phospholipid. Lipovitellin-1 contains two chains, LV1N and LV1C.

=== Yolk vitamins and minerals ===
Yolks hold more than 90% of the calcium, iron, phosphorus, zinc, thiamine, vitamin B_{6}, folate, vitamin B_{12}, and pantothenic acid of the egg. In addition, yolks cover all of the fat-soluble vitamins: A, D, E, and K in the egg, as well as all of the essential fatty acids.

A single yolk from a large egg contains roughly 22 mg of calcium, 66 mg of phosphorus, 9.5 micrograms of selenium, and 19 mg of potassium, according to the USDA.

=== Double-yolk eggs ===
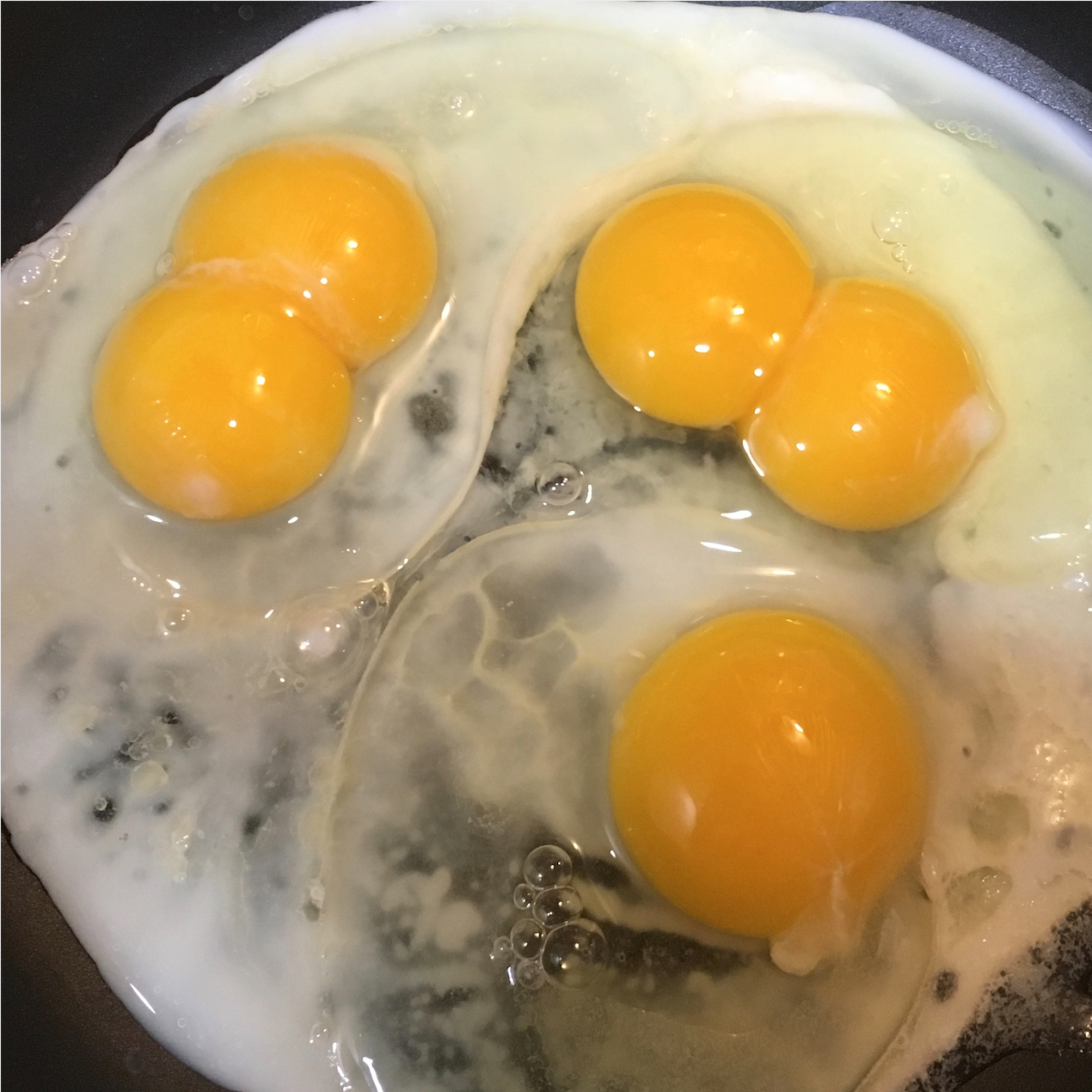
Three similarly sized eggs in a hot frying pan. Each of the two yolks in the double-yolked eggs are smaller than typical for that size of egg.

Double-yolk eggs occur when ovulation occurs too rapidly, or when one yolk becomes joined with another yolk. These eggs may be the result of a young hen's reproductive cycle not yet being synchronized.

Double-yolked eggs seldom lead to successful hatchlings without human intervention, as the chicks interfere with each other's hatching process and do not survive.

Higher-order yolks are rare, though hens are known to occasionally lay even triple-yolk eggs.

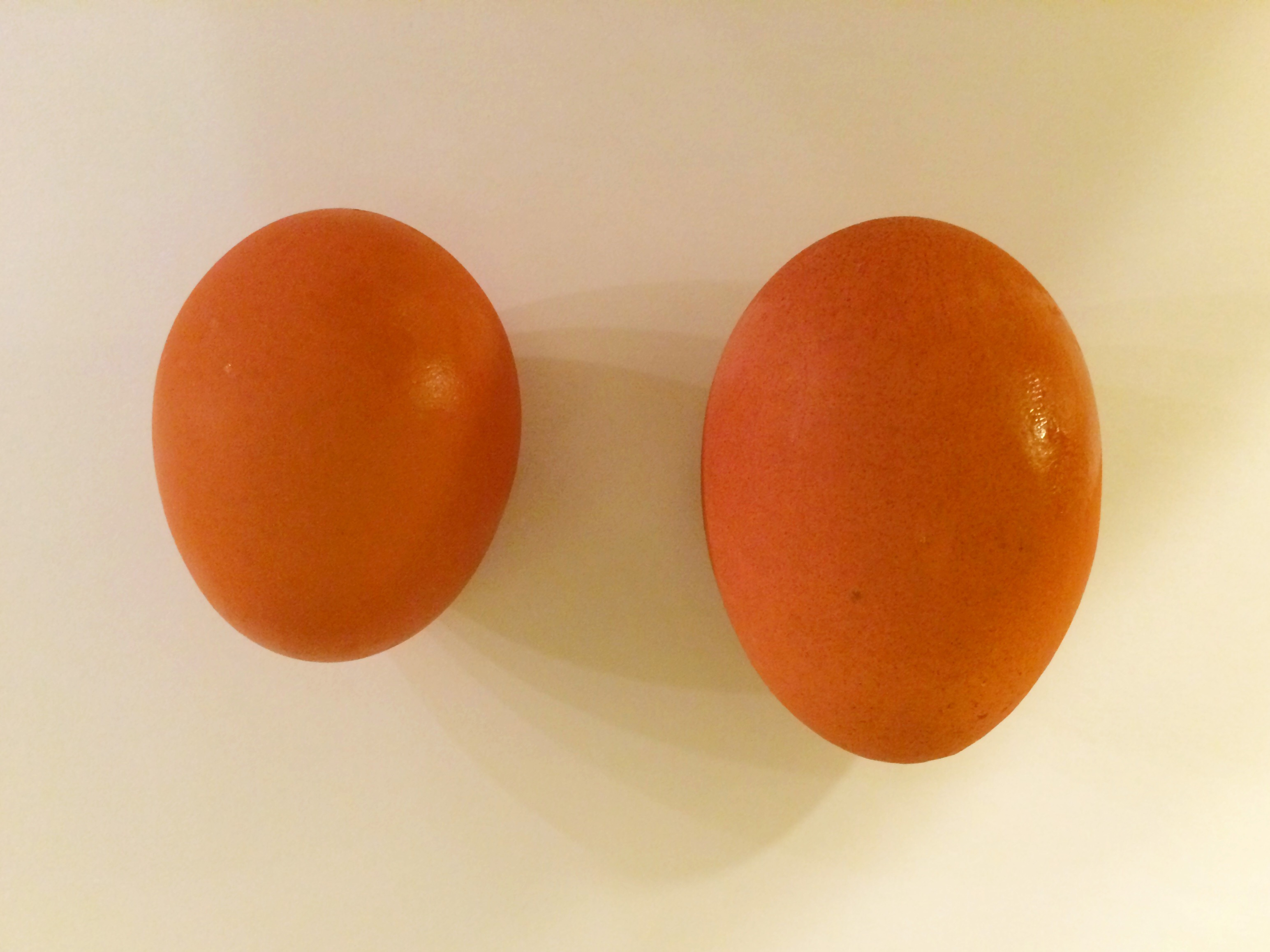
Comparison of an egg and an egg with a double-yolk (closed)

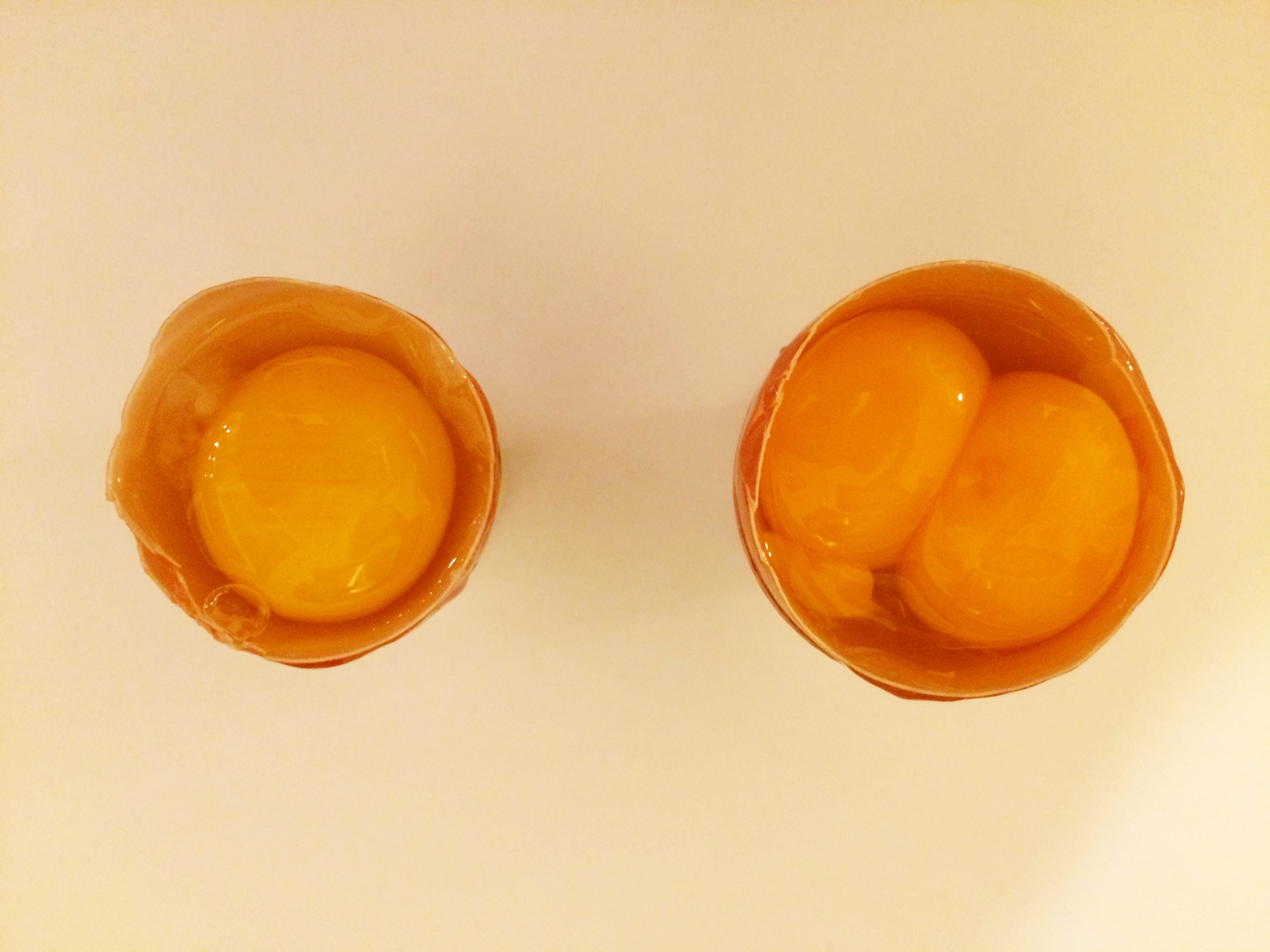
Comparison of an egg and an egg with a double-yolk (opened)

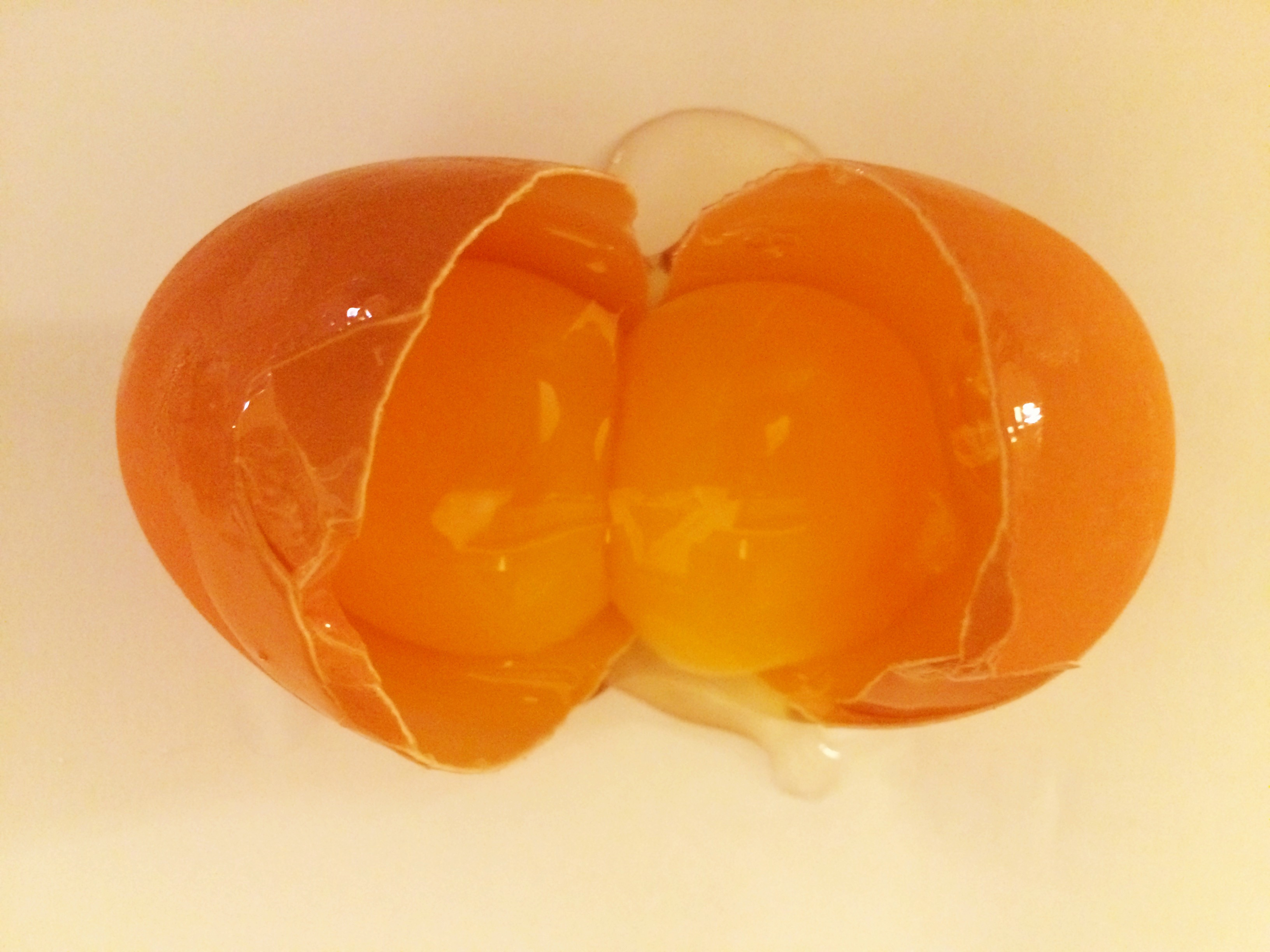
Double-yolk egg - Opened

=== Yolkless eggs ===
Eggs without yolks are known as "dwarf" or "wind" eggs, or the archaic term "cock egg". Such an egg is most often a pullet's first effort, produced before her laying mechanism is fully ready. Mature hens rarely lay a yolkless egg, but sometimes a piece of reproductive tissue breaks away and passes down the tube. Such a scrap of tissue may stimulate the egg-producing glands to react as though it were a yolk and wrap it in albumen, membranes, and a shell as it travels through the egg tube. This is usually what causes an egg to contain a small particle of grayish tissue instead of a yolk.

Since these eggs contain no yolk, and therefore cannot hatch, they were traditionally believed to have been laid by roosters. This type of egg occurs in many varieties of fowl and has been found in chickens, both standard and bantams, guineas, and coturnix quail.

=== Yolk color ===
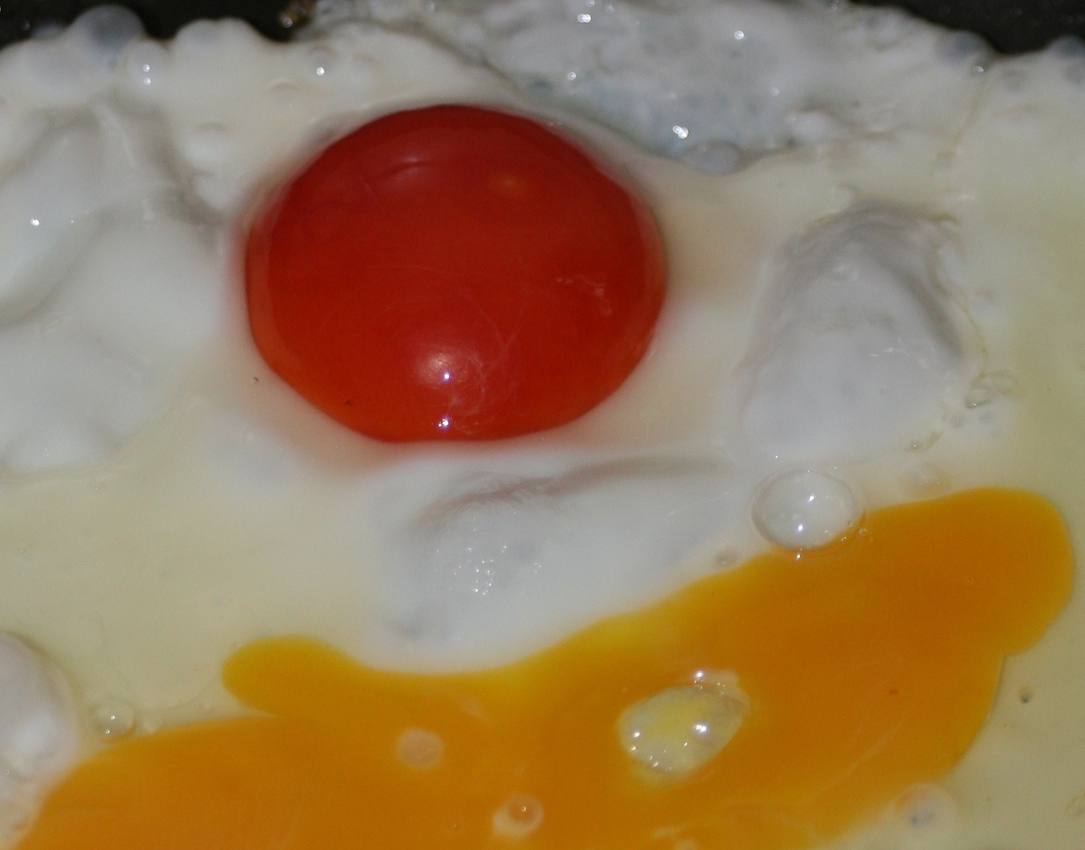
A chicken egg frying with an extremely thick red yolk. A normal-coloured yolk can also be seen, having been accidentally burst during the frying process.

The color of an egg yolk is directly influenced by the makeup of the chicken feed. Egg yolk color is generally more yellow when given a feed containing a large component of yellow, fat-soluble pigments, such as the carotenes in dark green plant material, for example alfalfa. Although much emphasis is put onto the color of the egg yolk, it does not reliably reflect the nutritional value of an egg. For example, some of the natural pigments that produce a rich yolk color are xanthophylls without much nutritional value, rather than the carotenoids that act as provitamin A in the body. Also, a diet rich in vitamin A itself, but without A-provitamins or xanthophylls, can produce practically colourless yolks that are just as nutritious as any richly colored yolks.

Yolks, particularly from free-range eggs, can be of a wide range of colors, ranging from nearly white, through yellow and orange, to practically red, or even olive green, depending on the pigments in their feed. Feeding fowl large amounts of capsicum peppers, for example, tends to result in red or deep orange yolks. This has nothing to do with adding colors such as cochineal to eggs in cooking.

== In fish ==
All bony fish, some sharks and rays have yolk sacs at some stage of development, with all oviparous fish retaining the sac after hatching. Lamniform sharks are ovoviviparous, in that their eggs hatch in utero; in addition to eating unfertilized eggs, unborn sharks participate in intrauterine-cannibalism: stronger pups consume their weaker womb-mates.

== In crustaceans ==
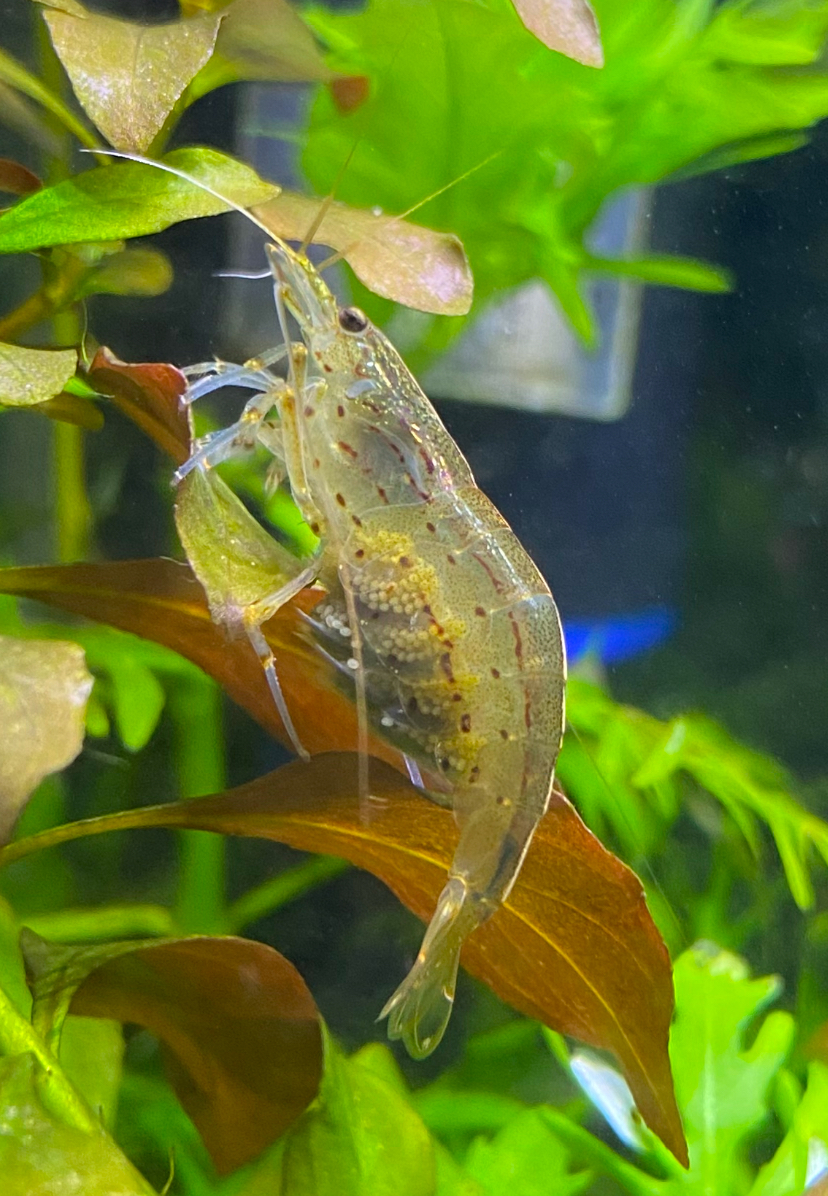
A pregnant Caridina multidentata in captivity, with oval-shaped eggs rich in yolk.

The yolk in crustacean eggs is essential for embryonic development, serving as a nutrient reservoir. In decapod crustaceans, the primary yolk precursor protein is apolipocrustacein (apoCr), which differs from the traditional vitellogenins (Vtgs) found in most oviparous animals. ApoCr shares greater structural and evolutionary similarity with insect apolipophorin II/I (apoLp-II/I) and vertebrate apolipoprotein B (apoB), distinguishing it from other members of the large lipid transfer protein (LLTP) superfamily.

ApoCr is a large glycolipoprotein, approximately 2,600 amino acids long, with conserved structural domains characteristic of LLTPs. These domains include an N-terminal lipid transfer module, a DUF1081 domain exclusive to apoLp-II/I and apoB, and a von Willebrand factor type D domain at the C-terminal. Additionally, it features a subtilisin-like cleavage site, a trait shared with apoLp-II/I. Evolutionary analyses reveal that apoCr is phylogenetically closer to apoLp-II/I than to Vtg proteins, indicating a distinct lineage for crustacean yolk proteins. In decapods, apoCr is typically expressed in both the ovary and hepatopancreas, supporting its dual roles in lipid metabolism and yolk formation. In some species, gene duplication events have resulted in multiple apoCr variants with tissue-specific functions.

== See also ==
- Vitellogenesis
