= Brian J. McVeigh =

American scholar of Asia

Brian J. McVeigh (born 1959) is an American scholar of Asia who specializes in Japanese pop art, education, politics, and history. He is also a theorist of cultural psychology and historical changes in human mentality. He received his doctorate in 1991 from Princeton University's Department of Anthropology. While a graduate student, he studied under Julian Jaynes whose influence is apparent in his research. He taught at the University of Arizona until 2013 and is a licensed mental health counselor. Currently he is researching how a Jaynesian psychology can be developed for therapeutic purposes, as seen in his The Self-healing Mind: Harnessing the Active Ingredients of Psychotherapy.

== Research ==
McVeigh has developed Jaynes's ideas in The Psychology of Ancient Egypt: Reconstructing a Lost Mentality, The Psychology of the Bible: Explaining Divine Voices and Visions, How Religion Evolved: Explaining the Living Dead, Talking Idols, and Mesmerizing Monuments, and The Psychology of Westworld: When Machines Go Mad. In this book McVeigh analyzed how the HBO series Westworld incorporated Jaynes's ideas of bicamerality. In The "Other" Psychology of Julian Jaynes: Ancient Languages, Sacred Visions, and Forgotten Mentalities he examined what he calls the super-religiosity of Bronze Age civilizations and proposed the "bicameral civilization inventory hypothesis" and the "embryonic psycholexicon hypothesis" of archaic societies. He called for a "stratigraphic psychology" that acknowledges radical changes in human psyche by incorporating evolutionary psychology findings while steering clear of simplistic cultural evolutionism. Jaynes's impact is also evident in McVeigh's first project which explored the role of spirit possession in a Japanese religious movement. His findings were published in Spirits, Selves, and Subjectivity in a Japanese New Religion: The Cultural Psychology of Belief in Sûkyô Mahikari (1997) and "Spirit Possession in Sûkyô Mahikari: A Variety of Sociopsychological Experience." His other relevant articles include "Mental Imagery and Hallucinations as Adaptive Behavior: Divine Voices and Visions as Neuropsychological Vestiges", "Standing Stomachs, Clamoring Chests and Cooling Livers: Metaphors in the Psychological Lexicon of Japanese" and "The Self as Interiorized Social Relations: Applying a Jaynesian Approach to Problems of Agency and Volition."

In A Psychohistory of Metaphors: Envisioning Time, Space, and Self through the Centuries McVeigh applies a Jaynesian analysis to how over time increasing abstraction and analogizing have radically altered our perceptions of time, space, and psyche. In The History of Japanese Psychology: Global Perspectives, 1875-1950 McVeigh continued his interest in a Jaynesian perspective in research on the history of Japanese psychology in an effort to illustrate global shifts in nineteenth-century definitions of human nature that resonate with the emergence of the independent citizen as the building block of national state construction, the autonomous producer and consumer of economic liberalism, the "inward turn" to a privileged protagonist in art, and the individualized subject as the crucial unit of analysis in academic psychology.

McVeigh edited a series of informal, wide-ranging, and unstructured discussions with Jaynes, compiled in Discussions with Julian Jaynes: The Nature of Consciousness and the Vagaries of Psychology. In this book Jaynes clarified the meaning of "consciousness" and explored the history of psychology and its prejudices, such as the marginalization of consciousness as a research topic, ignoring socio-historical aspects of psyche, the fraudulence of Freudianism, the conceptual emptiness of "cognitive."

In The Propertied Self: The Psychology of Economic History McVeigh explored the political implications of a Jaynesian psychology. He argued that whether neoliberal, social democratic, communist, or postsocialist, feverish consumerism characterizes political economies. McVeigh sees two trends characterizing history, the steady accumulation of wealth and an "inward turn" or "psychological interiorization" which legitimizes and promotes a "propertied self." For McVeigh this describes how the inner world of feelings and thoughts justify the individual-centered acquisition of possessions. He traces the transition from a worldview discouraging economic mobility to one that seduces us to "keep up with the Joneses." This development heralded the shift from sumptuary restrictions on consumption to faith in the liberating power and inherent goodness of property rights and unfettered self-expression.

Though McVeigh's original interests were in Sinology and he studied at Beijing University for one year (1982–1983), his publications have been about Japan. He spent many years teaching in Japan, and from 2002 to 2003 was chair of the Department of Cultural & Women's Studies at Tokyo Jogakkan College. His time in Japan significantly shaped his research focus (Interpreting Japan: Approaches and Applications for the Classroom). Much of his writing is based on many years of participant observation in Japan's education system. A fascination with the "staginess of social life" and simulation theory colors his work, and his interest in the intersection of psychology and politics is apparent in his linking of self-presentation with political economy. The theatricalization of gender roles is the topic of Life in a Japanese Women's College: Learning to Be Ladylike (1997). In Japanese Higher Education as Myth (2002) he asked "why do so many students pretend-study and so many faculty pretend-teach?" and investigated the disconnect between official policies and actual pedagogical practices. He termed the loss of academic value and poor quality schooling "institutional mendacity," a claim that earned him both criticism and praise in Japan. The book was nominated for the Francis Hsu Book Prize (2004), Society for East Asian Anthropology, American Anthropological Association.

In his third book on Japanese education, The State Bearing Gifts: Deception and Disaffection in Japanese Higher Education (2006), the influence of Jean Baudrillard, Umberto Eco, and Guy Debord is evident. By linking the ideas of these simulation theorists to the "gift" as defined by the French anthropologist Marcel Mauss, he charted the "exchange circuitry" that links and transfers value among Japan's education ministry, universities, instructors, and learners. With elite political and corporate interests determining policy, the purpose of education is lost and the value of grades and diplomas is diluted. The staginess of educational policies results from burdensome "exchange dramatics" among students (always being on one's best behavior for teachers, preparing for too many exams, etc.). He contends that his arguments about Japanese higher education possess general applicability: the more intense massive bureaucratic forces become, the more we excessively dramatize ourselves for the wrong reasons. The consequence is a "parareality" that breeds self-deception, inauthenticity, and alienation.

His other works have also pursued the theme of how politics shapes the psychology of self-presentation. In The Nature of the Japanese State: Rationality and Rituality (1998) he explained how "state guidance" of educational structures and "moral education" are official attempts to ensure the values of hierarchy, centralization, compartmentalization, and standardization in Japan's political economy and civil society. In Wearing Ideology: State, Schooling, and Self-Presentation in Japan (2000) he turned his attention to the cultural psychology of how we stage our selves and looked at the role of material culture (school uniforms and other accoutrements) in the management of self-appearance.

In Nationalisms of Japan: Managing and Mystifying Identity (2003) he explored the varieties of nationalist expression. He stressed that Japanese policies are informed by "renovationism": the more an ostensible Japanese authentic identity is threatened, the more modernizing national projects are pursued to refurbish Japan's economic might. These latter policies ironically increase the perception of identity threat since modernization, at least from an idealized "traditional" perspective, makes Japan seem somehow more "foreign." The result is an ideological positive feedback loop with practical consequences for Japan's policy-making circles.

== Selected publications ==
- McVeigh, Brian J. (1997). Spirits, Selves, and Subjectivity in a Japanese New Religion: The Cultural Psychology of Belief in Sūkyō Mahikari. Lewiston, New York: Edwin Mellen Press. ISBN 0773484302.
- McVeigh, Brian J. (1998). Life in a Japanese Women's College: Learning to Be Ladylike. London: Routledge. ISBN 978-0415867924.
- McVeigh, Brian J. (1998). The Nature of the Japanese State: Rationality and Rituality. London: Routledge. ISBN 978-1138863033.
- McVeigh, Brian J. (2000). Wearing Ideology: State, Schooling, and Self-Presentation in Japan. Oxford: Berg Publishers. ISBN 1-85973-490-1.
- McVeigh, Brian J. (2002). Japanese Higher Education as Myth. Armonk, New York: M. E. Sharpe. ISBN 978-0765609243.
- McVeigh, Brian J. (2003). Nationalisms of Japan: Managing and Mystifying Identity. Boulder, Colorado: Rowman & Littlefield. ISBN 978-1417503513.
- McVeigh, Brian J. (2006). The State Bearing Gifts: Deception and Disaffection in Japanese Higher Education. Boulder, Colorado: Lexington Books. ISBN 978-0739113448.
- McVeigh, Brian J. (2014). Interpreting Japan: Approaches and Applications for the Classroom. London: Routledge. ISBN 978-0415730167.
- McVeigh, Brian J. (2015). The Propertied Self: The Psychology of Economic History. New York: Nova Science Publishers.
- McVeigh, Brian J. (2016). Discussions with Julian Jaynes: The Nature of Consciousness and the Vagaries of Psychology. New York: Nova Science Publishers. ISBN 978-1-5361-0054-9.
- McVeigh, Brian J. (2016). How Religion Evolved: Explaining the Living Dead, Talking Idols, and Mesmerizing Monuments. Piscataway, NJ: Transaction Publishers.
- McVeigh, Brian J. (2016). A Psychohistory of Metaphors: Envisioning Time, Space, and Self through the Centuries. Lanham, Maryland: Lexington. ISBN 978-1-4985-2028-7.
- McVeigh, Brian J. (2017). The History of Japanese Psychology: Global Perspectives, 1875-1950. London: Bloomsbury. ISBN 978-1-4742-8308-3.
- McVeigh, Brian J. (2017). The "Other" Psychology of Julian Jaynes: Ancient Languages, Sacred Visions, and Forgotten Mentalities. Exeter, UK: Imprint Academic. ISBN 978-1-84540-951-7.
- McVeigh, Brian J. The Psychology of Westworld: When Machines Go Mad. Kindle Edition. Amazon.com Services, 2018. ASIN B07CL7YFGB.
- McVeigh, Brian J. (2020). The Psychology of the Bible: Explaining Divine Voices and Visions. Exeter, UK: Imprint Academic. ISBN 978-1-78836-037-1.
- McVeigh, Brian J. (2022). The Self-healing Mind: Harnessing the Active Ingredients of Psychotherapy. Oxford University Press. ISBN 978-0-19-764786-8.
- McVeigh, Brian J. (2023). The Psychology of Egypt: Reconstructing a Lost Mentality. Henderson, NV: Julian Jaynes Society. ISBN 1737305542.
- McVeigh, Brian J. (2025). Japanese Spirituality and Its Vestiges: Challenging the Standard Model of Religious History. London: Bloomsbury Publishing. ISBN 1666977934.
- McVeigh, Brian J. (2026). The Psychology of Julian Jaynes: A Guided for the Perplexed. New Castle upon Tyne, UK: Cambridge Scholars Press. ISBN 1-0364-8222-7.
