= APHA color =

Color standard used to assess liquids

APHA color, also referred to as the Hazen scale, and more appropriately as the Platinum Cobalt(Pt/Co) scale, is a color standard named for the American Public Health Association and defined by ASTM D1209. It was originally intended to describe the color of waste water, but its usage has expanded to include other industrial applications. APHA color is a color scale sometimes referred to as a "yellowness index" that is used to assess the quality of liquids that are clear to yellowish in color.

It is similar to the Hazen color test, to which it is sometimes incorrectly referred. The Hazen color test uses a Pt/Co solution and was developed for water treatment facilities where the Color of water could be used as a measure of concentration of dissolved and particulate material. Slight discoloration is measured in Hazen units (HU). Impurities can be deeply colored as well, for instance dissolved organic compounds called tannins can result in dark brown colors.

== History ==
Developed in the 1890s by chemist Allen Hazen (1869–1930), this color scale's original purpose was to assist in the determination of the quality of public water supplies. Since then other uses of APHA color have been demonstrated in chemical, pharmaceutical, beverage, plastic and petroleum industries

== Science ==
- The scale for APHA color goes from 0 to 500 in units of parts per million of platinum cobalt to water. Zero on this scale represents distilled water, or what is more commonly called white water.
- APHA standards can be used for both visual comparison and instrumental measurements. Standards can be bought pre-mixed or made by following guidelines prepared by the American Society for Testing and Materials' (ASTM). The mixture itself is an acidic solution of potassium hexachloro- platinate(IV) and cobalt(II) chloride with different levels of dilution for intermediate steps.
- The procedure to using APHA color is as follows:

"Introduce 100 mL of [the] specimen into a Nessler tube, passing the specimen through a filter if it has any visible turbidity. Cap the tube, place in the comparator, and compare with the standards." Once this is done there is a specific method of reporting results. You determine which standard is the closest to your specimen and report its color standard number. If difference in hue between the standard and the specimen causes issues trying to determine a match, you can report a range of values, noting that it is "off-hue".

- Highly colored samples (> 500 PCU) require a short optical path-length (OPL) while slightly colored samples (<100 PCU) require a long OPL, typically 200mm. A reference wavelength of 650nm or 850nm is used to compensate for turbidity and window fouling.

== See also ==
- Allen Hazen
- Hazen unit
- Pt/Co scale
