= Wine-dark sea =

Translation of phrase attributed to Homer

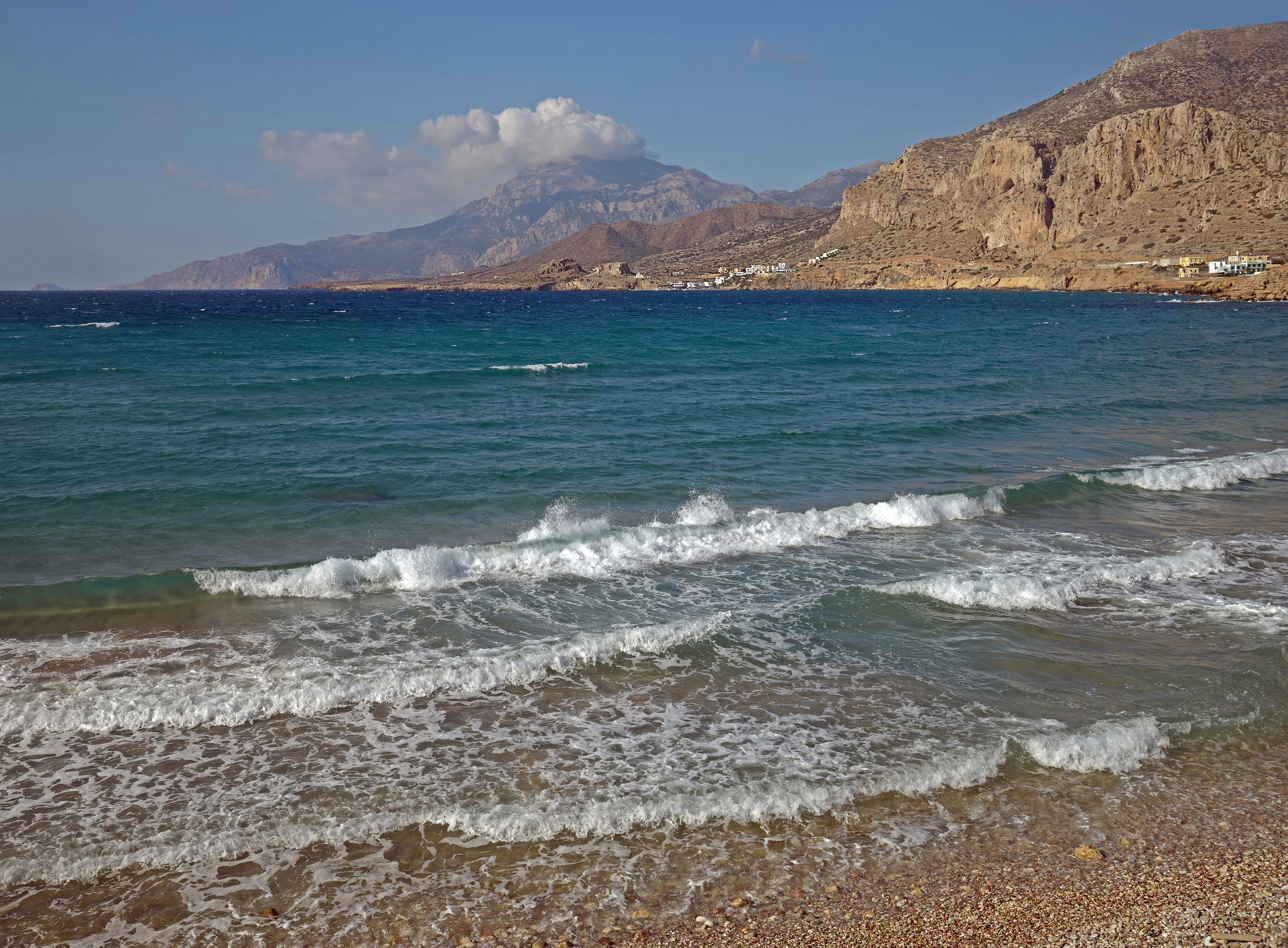
View from Karpathos, near the island of Crete, in the Mediterranean Sea

Wine-dark sea is a traditional English translation of oînops póntos (οἶνοψ πόντος, IPA: /ôi̯.nops pón.tos/), from oînos (οἶνος, "wine") + óps (ὄψ, "eye; face"), a Homeric epithet.

A literal translation is "wine-faced sea" (wine-faced, wine-eyed). It is attested five times in the Iliad and twelve times in the Odyssey often to describe rough, stormy seas. The only other use of oînops in the works of Homer is for oxen, for which it is used once in the Iliad and once in the Odyssey, where it describes a reddish colour. The phrase has become a common example when talking about the use of colour in ancient Greek texts.

== Analysis of the phrase ==
One of the first to observe Homer's description of colours was British statesman William Gladstone. In his 1858 book Studies on Homer and the Homeric Age, Gladstone analysed all aspects of Homer's mythical world, to discover a total absence of blue from the poet's descriptions of the Greek natural scenery. The word kyanós (κυανός), which in later stages of Greek meant blue, does make a limited appearance, but in Homer it almost certainly meant "dark", as it was used to describe the eyebrows of Zeus. Gladstone proposed that the Homeric usage of colour-terms focused not on hue, as contemporary usage does, but primarily on how light or dark the object being described was. Many readers, however, have read Gladstone's explanation of Homer's colour terms as a suggestion that he and the other ancient Greeks were colourblind. The most controversial line is his claim that "the organ of colour and its impressions were but partially developed among the Greeks of the heroic age" – although it has been noted in his defence that the word "organ" at the time could also be used for a mental faculty. After his book was published, Gladstone himself denied that he suggested here the Greeks suffered from colourblindness, and explained: "My meaning was substantially this: that he [Homer] operated, in the main, upon a quantitative scale, with white and black, or light and dark, for its opposite extremities, instead of the qualitative scale opened by the diversities of colour."

Building on Gladstone's findings, the German philologist Lazarus Geiger extended the analysis beyond Greek in the 1860s, examining ancient texts including the Vedas, the Koran, the Hebrew Bible, and early Icelandic and Chinese sources. He found that blue was absent from all of them. Geiger further proposed that colour terminology develops in a universal sequence across languages: beginning with words for dark and light, followed by red, then yellow and green, with blue consistently appearing last. This hierarchy directly anticipated the framework later formalized by Berlin and Kay in 1969.

In the 1980s a theory gained prominence that after Greeks mixed their wine with hard, alkaline water typical for the Peloponnesus, it became darker and more of a blue-ish colour. Approximately at the same time P. G. Maxwell-Stuart noted that, in general usage the term οἰνωπός – "wine-eyed" – refers to a 'deep reddish-brown', but that its connotations in poetry include, 'drunkenness, blood, and the abandon which accompanies surrender to alcohol and so, through those associations, it can be made to imply unsteadiness, violence, anger, and even death'. Thus, the epithet, when applied to the sea, could also be evoking its turbulence rather than just its darkness.

== Development of colour terms in language ==
The 'wine-dark sea' has often been invoked, along with the seeming lack of a word to refer to 'blue' in the Homeric texts as part of the larger discussion about the development of colour-naming in different cultures. Brent Berlin and Paul Kay's famous 1969 study and subsequent book Basic Color Terms hypothesized that early in a language's development of colour terminology, languages would only have a few words for basic colours: beginning with only two words for light and dark, and subsequently developing words for reddish and bluish colours, before they eventually accrued nearly a dozen words to segment up the colour wheel into finer gradations. Although the theory has been fine-tuned significantly in the subsequent decades, and though even the basic framework is sometimes subject to significant controversy, Berlin and Kay's work could help explain why colours in many ancient literary works seem to work differently than in modern languages.

== Popular culture references ==
Homer's translated phrase has been used by other authors:

- The Wine-Dark Sea (1966) a short story by Robert Aickman
- The Wine-Dark Sea (1993) a novel by Patrick O'Brian
- The Body of Myth (1994) a book by J. Nigro Sansonese on shamanic trance where Wine-Dark Sea is intended as a sensory trigger for trance
- Winedark Open Sea (1993) a song by Paul McCartney from the album Off the Ground
- Wine Dark Sea (2014) an album by Jolie Holland
- Good in Red (2020), a song by American synthwave band The Midnight from their album Horror Show, uses the phrase in their lyrics; "Just werewolves tossing dollar bills/And the wine-dark sea of Malibu"
- Death Sails a Wine-Dark Sea (2025), an adventure module for the Pathfinder Roleplaying Game.
- Quoted in "Down in the Bottom"; the first track on Walter Becker's album 11 Tracks of Whack.

== See also ==
- Ancient Greece and wine § Origins
- Studies on Homer and the Homeric Age § Colour controversy
- Color of water § Color names
