= Pt/Co scale =

The Platinum-Cobalt Scale (Pt/Co scale or Apha-Hazen Scale) is a color scale that was introduced in 1892 by chemist Allen Hazen (1869–1930). The index was developed as a way to evaluate pollution levels in waste water. It has since expanded to a common method of comparison of the intensity of yellow-tinted samples. It is specific to the color yellow and is based on dilutions of a 500 ppm platinum cobalt solution. The colour produced by one milligram of platinum cobalt dissolved in one liter of water is fixed as one unit of colour in platinum-cobalt scale. The ASTM has detailed description and procedures in ASTM Designation D1209, "Standard Test Method for Color of Clear Liquids (Platinum-Cobalt Scale)".

Colour may be reported on a water quality report using this scale.

== See also ==
- APHA color
