= Julian Jaynes =

American psychologist

- Born: February 27, 1920; West Newton, Massachusetts, United States
- Died: November 21, 1997 (aged 77); Charlottetown, Prince Edward Island, Canada
- Education: Harvard University; McGill University (BA); University of Toronto; Yale University (MA, PhD)
- Occupations: Psychologist, writer

Julian Jaynes (February 27, 1920 – November 21, 1997) was an American psychologist who worked at the universities of Yale and Princeton for nearly 25 years and became best known for his 1976 book The Origin of Consciousness in the Breakdown of the Bicameral Mind. His work focused on the problem of consciousness: "the difference between what others see of us and our sense of our inner selves and the deep feelings that sustain it. ... Men have been conscious of the problem of consciousness almost since consciousness began." Jaynes's solution touches on many disciplines, including neuroscience, linguistics, psychology, archeology, history, religion and analysis of ancient texts.

== Early life ==
Jaynes was born and lived in West Newton, Massachusetts, son of Julian Clifford Jaynes (1854–1922), a Unitarian minister, and Clara Bullard Jaynes (1884–1980). He had an older sister, Helen, and a younger brother, Robert. The family had a summer home in Keppoch, Prince Edward Island, which was a place Jaynes loved, and which gave him a Canadian connection for his entire life.

In the summer of 1939 he registered to attend Harvard University but took a scholarship from McGill University, where he graduated in 1941 with a bachelor's degree in psychology, and then began graduate studies at the University of Toronto to learn more about the brain. His studies were interrupted during the Second World War: because of his Unitarian principles, he applied for and received official recognition as a conscientious objector, but refused to comply with the U.S. government's law for pacifists; Jaynes spent three years in the penitentiary at Lewisburg, Pennsylvania, working in the prison hospital. On his release in 1946 he enrolled at Yale University hoping that in animal behavior he would find clues to the beginnings of consciousness. Jaynes received his master's degree in 1948, and then refused to accept his doctorate, again on a dispute of "principle" regarding educational credentials. After Yale, Jaynes spent several years in England working as an actor and playwright.

== Academic career ==
He returned to Yale in 1954, working as an Instructor and Lecturer until 1960, making significant contributions in the fields of experimental psychology, learning, and ethology, and co-publishing some papers with Frank A. Beach. Jaynes had begun to turn his focus to comparative psychology and the history of psychology, and in 1964 he became a research associate at Princeton University. There he befriended Edwin G. Boring, and with plenty of time to pursue the problem of consciousness, Princeton became his academic home until 1995.

=== Research and motivations ===
Jaynes had dedicated years of research in psychology to the problem of consciousness and he had sought the roots of consciousness in the processes of learning and cognition that animals and humans shared in common, in accord with prevailing evolutionary assumptions that dominated mid-20th century thinking. He had established his reputation in the study of animal learning and natural animal behaviour, and in 1968 he lectured on the history of comparative psychology at the National Science Foundation Summer Institute. In September 1969 he gave his first public address on his "new theory of consciousness" at the annual meeting of the American Psychological Association.

His "radical approach" explained the phenomena of introspection as dependent on culture and language, especially metaphors, more than on the physiology of the brain. This was a challenge to mainstream assumptions of 20th century research, especially to those that justified looking for origins of consciousness in evolution. It was also a challenge to the behaviorists, who, "under the tutelage of John Watson, solved the problem of consciousness by ignoring it." What they had 'ignored' were the problems of introspection and the weaknesses of introspectionist methods of 19th century psychologists. Those 20th century thinkers who questioned the existence of introspection never doubted the existence of sense perception, however; they clearly distinguished between the two. On the other hand, in later years Jaynes's approach had become "radical" for emphasizing the distinction. Jaynes differed with those who ignored it, for example Stuart Sutherland, who simply defined consciousness as 'awareness'. Jaynes acknowledged that his whole argument was "contradictory to the usual and [...] superficial views of consciousness", and he insisted that "the most common error" people make "is to confuse consciousness with perception."

But there can be no progress in the science of consciousness until careful distinctions have been made between what is introspectable and all the hosts of other neural abilities we have come to call cognition. Consciousness is not the same as cognition and should be sharply distinguished from it.

In the years following, Jaynes talked more about how consciousness began, presenting "his talk [...] widely, as word of his slightly outrageous but tantalizing theory had spread." In 1972 he had delivered a paper, "The Origin of Consciousness", at Cornell University, writing: "For if consciousness is based on language, then it follows that only humans are conscious, and that we became so at some historical epoch after language was evolved." This took Jaynes, as he put it, directly into "the earliest writings of mankind to see if we can find any hints as to when this important invention of consciousness might have occurred." He went to ancient texts searching for early evidence of consciousness, and found what he believed to be evidence of remarkably recent voice-hearing without consciousness. In the semi-historical Greek epic the Iliad Jaynes found "the earliest writing of men in a language that we can really comprehend, [which] when looked at objectively, reveals a very different mentality from our own." In a 1978 interview, Richard Rhodes reported that Jaynes "took up the study of Greek to trace Greek words for mind back to their origins. By the time he got to the Iliad, the words had become concrete, but there is no word for mind in the Iliad at all."

=== Publications and theories ===
Jaynes's one and only book, published in 1976, is The Origin of Consciousness in the Breakdown of the Bicameral Mind. The topic of consciousness – "the human ability to introspect" – is introduced by reviewing prior efforts to explain its problematic nature: those efforts, as one of Jaynes's early critics has acknowledged, add up to a "spectacular history of failure". Abandoning the assumption that consciousness is innate, Jaynes explains it instead as a learned behavior that "arises ... from language, and specifically from metaphor." With this understanding, Jaynes then demonstrates that ancient texts and archeology can reveal a history of human mentality alongside the histories of other cultural products. His analysis of the evidence leads him not only to place the origin of consciousness during the 2nd millennium BCE but also to hypothesize the existence of an older non-conscious "mentality that he calls the bicameral mind, referring to the brain's two hemispheres".

After publishing The Origin of Consciousness in the Breakdown of the Bicameral Mind, Jaynes was frequently invited to speak at conferences and as a guest lecturer at other universities. In 1984, he was invited to give the plenary lecture at the Wittgenstein Symposium in Kirchberg, Austria. He gave six major lectures in 1985 and nine in 1986. He was awarded an honorary PhD by Rhode Island College in 1979 and another from Elizabethtown College in 1985.

Jaynes wrote an extensive afterword for the 1990 edition of his book, in which he addressed criticisms and clarified that his theory has four separate hypotheses: 1) consciousness is based on and accessed by language; 2) the non-conscious bicameral mind is based on verbal hallucinations; 3) the breakdown of bicameral mind precedes consciousness, but the dating is variable; 4) the "double brain" of bicamerality is based on the two hemispheres of the cerebral cortex being organized differently from today's functional lateralization. He also expanded on the impact of consciousness on imagination and memory, notions of the self, emotions, anxiety, guilt, and sexuality.

== Death ==
Jaynes died at the Queen Elizabeth Hospital in Charlottetown, Prince Edward Island, on November 21, 1997. In 2006, his biographers Woodward and Tower reported that Jaynes "felt he had not truly succeeded" in his lifelong work because, in their words, "[h]e was right" about his feeling that "there were people who disagreed with him [who] had not really read his book or understood it."

== Legacy ==
The Julian Jaynes Society was founded by Marcel Kuijsten in 1997, shortly after Jaynes's death. The society has published a number of books on Julian Jaynes's theory including foreign-language editions of Julian Jaynes's theory in French, German, and Spanish. The society also maintains a member area, with articles, lectures, and interviews on Jaynes's theory.

== Works ==
Articles

- Jaynes, J. (1973). "The Problem of Animate Motion in the Seventeenth Century". In Henle, M.; Jaynes, J.; Sullivan, J. (eds.). Historical Conceptions of Psychology. New York: Springer Publishing Company. pp. 166–179.
- Jaynes, J. (1976). "The Evolution of Language in the Late Pleistocene". In Harnad, S.; Steklis, H. D.; Lancaster, J. B. (eds.). Origins and Evolution of Language and Speech. Annals of the New York Academy of Sciences. Vol. 280. pp. 312–325. doi:10.1111/j.1749-6632.1976.tb25496.x.

Books

- Jaynes, Julian (1976). The Origin of Consciousness in the Breakdown of the Bicameral Mind (1st ed.). Boston: Houghton Mifflin. ISBN 978-0395329320.
- Jaynes, Julian (2012). Kuijsten, Marcel (ed.). The Julian Jaynes Collection. Julian Jaynes Society. ISBN 978-0-9790744-2-4. A collection of articles, interviews, and discussion with Julian Jaynes.
