= Studies on Homer and the Homeric Age =

1858 book by William Gladstone

- Cover of 2010 edition
- Author: William Ewart Gladstone
- Language: English
- Publisher: Oxford University Press
- Publication date: 1858
- Publication place: United Kingdom
- Media type: Print

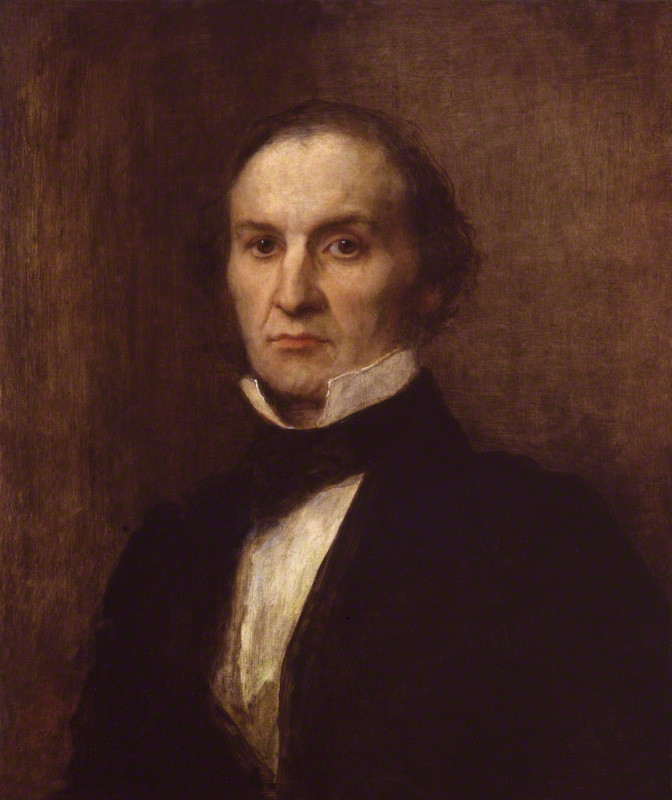
Gladstone in 1859, painted by George Frederic Watts

Studies on Homer and the Homeric Age is a book written by four-time British Prime Minister William Gladstone in 1858, discussing a range of issues in Homer including an original thesis on colour perception in Ancient Greece. Gladstone was M.P. for the University of Oxford at the time of publication, but had been trained as a classicist.

== Colour controversy ==
The section of the book that has received the most mainstream attention is Gladstone's analysis of Homeric language related to colours. Gladstone raises the issue that the colours Homer attributed to many natural objects feel strange to modern readers. For example, Homer applies the adjective porphyreos, which in later Greek roughly means "purple" or "dark red," to describe blood, a dark cloud, a wave, and a rainbow, and he uses the epithet oinops ("wine-looking") to refer to the sea. Gladstone explained this by suggesting that the ancient Greeks categorized colours mainly in terms of lightness, darkness and saturation, rather than in terms of hue.

Many readers, however, have read Gladstone's explanation of Homer's colour terms as a suggestion that he and the other ancient Greeks were colourblind. The most controversial line is his claim that "the organ of colour and its impressions were but partially developed among the Greeks of the heroic age" – although it has been noted in his defence that the word "organ" at the time could also be used for a mental faculty. After his book was published, Gladstone himself denied that he suggested here the Greeks suffered from colourblindness, and explained: "My meaning was substantially this: that he [Homer] operated, in the main, upon a quantitative scale, with white and black, or light and dark, for its opposite extremities, instead of the qualitative scale opened by the diversities of colour."

Later linguistic research indicates that the Greek language probably did not have a word for the color blue at that time. Color names often developed individually, beginning with black and white, and then red, and only much later adding the color blue, probably when the pigment could be manufactured reliably. (See Basic Color Terms.)

== See also ==
- Color term
- Wine-dark sea
- Linguistic relativity and the color naming debate

== Sources ==
- Gladstone, William Ewart (1858). Studies on Homer and the Homeric Age. Oxford: At The University Press – via Internet Archive., volume 1, volume 2, volume 3.
