= Michael Schwartz =

Michael or Mike Schwartz may refer to:

- Mix Master Mike (Michael Schwartz, born 1970), American turntablist
- Michael Schwartz (sociologist) (born 1942), American sociologist
- Mike Schwartz (screenwriter), American actor and writer
- Michael Schwartz (physician) (born 1961), American physician
- Michael Schwartz (educational administrator) (1937–2024), American academic administrator
- Mike Schwartz (activist) (1950–2013), American anti-abortion activist
- Michael Warren Schwartz (fl. 1996–2012), professor of medicine
- Michal Schwartz (born 1950), Israeli professor of neuroimmunology
- Mike Schwartz (basketball) (born 1949), American-Israeli basketball player
- Michael A. Schwartz (born 1944), American academic and psychiatrist
- Mike Schwartz (ice hockey), American ice hockey player and coach

== See also ==
- Michael Schwarz (disambiguation)
