= John Cutting (psychiatrist) =

British psychiatrist

John Charles Cutting
- Born: Aberdeen, Scotland, UK
- Occupations: Psychiatrist and writer
- Writing career
- Language: English
- Genre: Psychiatry
- Subjects: Psychiatry, clinical psychology, schizophrenia research, philosophical psychopathology, cerebral hemispheres

John Charles Cutting is a British psychiatrist specialising in schizophrenia research. He has written a number of books, and articles and reviews in professional journals, on the subjects of psychiatry, clinical psychology, schizophrenia and the functioning of the right cerebral hemisphere of the brain.

Cutting has been an honorary senior lecturer at King's College Hospital in London and the Institute of Psychiatry in London.

== Life and career ==
John Cutting was born in Aberdeen 1952, Scotland, and brought up in Yorkshire, England. He studied and qualified as a doctor of medicine in London and went on to train in psychiatry.

Cutting is a psychiatrist based in London.

Cutting worked as a consultant psychiatrist at Maudsley Hospital, London and Bethlem Royal Hospital, a specialist psychiatric facility at Beckenham in the London Borough of Bromley, and the Institute of Psychiatry in London for 20 years. He has been an honorary senior lecturer at King's College Hospital, London and the Institute of Psychiatry.

Since the early 1990s, Cutting "has been studying philosophy with the aim of contributing to the growing discipline of philosophical psychopathology – explaining conditions such as schizophrenia and depression in philosophical terms."

He has written a number of books, and articles and reviews in professional journals, on the subjects of psychiatry, clinical psychology, psychopathology, schizophrenia and the functioning of the right cerebral hemisphere of the brain.

In September 2005, Cutting was a speaker at a two-day international conference in London, at the Institute of Psychiatry, entitled "Phenomenology and Psychiatry for the 21st Century."

=== Awards ===
In 1977, whilst he was working at the Maudsley Hospital, Cutting won The Gaskell Medal and Prize from the Royal College of Psychiatrists.

=== Influence ===
Speaking in an interview with Frontier Psychiatrist, Iain McGilchrist, author of The Master and His Emissary, a book about the world views of the two hemispheres of the brain, stated: "What I began to see – and it was John Cutting's work on the right hemisphere that set me thinking – was that the difference lay not in what they do, but how they do it."

== Selected publications ==
=== Books ===
- Cutting, John C. (June 1985). Psychology of Schizophrenia (Illustrated ed.). Oxford, England: Churchill Livingstone. ISBN 0-443-02663-7. (Hardcover)
- Cutting, John (March 1990). The Right Cerebral Hemisphere and Psychiatric Disorders (Hardcover). Oxford, England and New York City: Oxford University Press. ISBN 0-19-261764-8. (Hardcover)
- Charlish, Anne; Cutting, John (10 July 1995). Schizophrenia: Understanding and Coping with the Illness. London, England: Thorsons Health. ISBN 0-7225-3122-2. (Paperback)
- Cutting, John C. (15 January 1997). Principles of Psychopathology: Two Worlds – Two Minds – Two Hemispheres. Oxford, England: Oxford University Press. ISBN 0-19-262240-4.
- Cutting, John (April 1999). Psychopathology and Modern Philosophy. Haywards Heath, West Sussex, England: Forest Publishing Co. ISBN 0-9535703-0-4. (Paperback)
- Cutting, John (June 2002). The Living, the Dead and the Never-alive: Schizophrenia and Depression as Fundamental Variants of These. Haywards Heath, West Sussex, England: Forest Publishing Co. ISBN 0-9535703-1-2. (Paperback)
- Charlish, Anne; Cutting, John (17 March 2008). Schizophrenia: Understanding and Coping with the Illness. London, England: HarperCollins Publishers Ltd. ISBN 978-0-00-728416-0. (Hardcover)
- Cutting, John (May 2012). A Critique of Psychopathology. Berlin, Germany: Parados. p. 402. ISBN 978-3-938880-51-7. (Paperback)

=== Books edited ===
- Cutting, John; Shepherd, Michael (28 November 1986). The Clinical Roots of the Schizophrenia Concept: Translations of Seminal European Contributions on Schizophrenia. Cambridge, England: Cambridge University Press. ISBN 0-521-26635-1. (Hardcover)
- Cutting, John C.; David, Anthony S., eds. (1994). The neuropsychology of schizophrenia. Brain, Behaviour and Cognition Series. Hove, UK Hillsdale, USA: Lawrence Erlbaum Associates, Inc. ISBN 9780863773037.

=== Journal articles ===
- Cutting, J.; Ryan, K. (August 1982). "The appreciation of imagery by schizophrenics: an interpretation of Goldstein's impairment of the abstract attitude". Psychological Medicine. 12 (3). Cambridge University Press: 585–590. doi:10.1017/S0033291700055689. PMID 7134315. S2CID 37546002..
- Cutting, John; Dunne, Francis (1989). "Subjective Experience of Schizophrenia". Schizophrenia Bulletin. 15 (2). Oxford University Press and Maryland Psychiatric Research Center (MPRC): 217–231. doi:10.1093/schbul/15.2.217. PMID 2749185.
- Cutting, J. (July 1989). "Gestalt theory and psychiatry: discussion paper". Journal of the Royal Society of Medicine. 82 (7). Royal Society of Medicine: 429–431. doi:10.1177/014107688908200719. PMC 1292212. PMID 2685305..
- Cutting, John (1990). "Clinical Use of Anticonvulsants in Psychiatric Disorders". Journal of Neurology, Neurosurgery & Psychiatry. 53 (4). BMJ Publishing Group Ltd: 362–363. doi:10.1136/jnnp.53.4.362-c. PMC 1014193..
- McGilchrist, I.; Cutting, J. (1995). "Somatic delusions in schizophrenia and the affective psychoses". British Journal of Psychiatry. 167 (3). Royal College of Psychiatrists: 350–361. doi:10.1192/bjp.167.3.350. PMID 7496644. S2CID 10976749.
- Cutting, John (1 June 1996). "Book Reviews : E. Minkowski. Le Temps vécu. Paris: Presses Universitaires de France, 1995". History of Psychiatry. 7 (26). SAGE Publications: 337–339. doi:10.1177/0957154X9600702612. S2CID 143513847.
- Cutting, John (August 2001). "Commentary: Knowing and Valuing". The Journal of Neuropsychiatry and Clinical Neurosciences. 13 (3). American Neuropsychiatric Association: 410–411. doi:10.1176/appi.neuropsych.13.3.410. PMID 11514651..
- Cutting, John (December 2001). "On Kimura's Ecrits de psychopathologie phenomenologique". Philosophy, Psychiatry, & Psychology. 8 (4). The Johns Hopkins University Press: 337–338. doi:10.1353/ppp.2002.0017. S2CID 144496653. E-ISSN 1086-3303 Print ISSN 1071-6076.
- Cutting, J. (2004). "Gestalt Psychology and Schizophrenia". Gestalt Theory. 26 (4). Krammer: 331–334. ISSN 0170-057X.. (in German)
- Cutting, John (June 2009). "Scheler, Phenomenology, and Psychopathology". Philosophy, Psychiatry, & Psychology. 16 (2). The Johns Hopkins University Press: 143–159. doi:10.1353/ppp.0.0234 (inactive 12 July 2025). E-ISSN 1086-3303 Print ISSN 1071-6076.

=== Translations ===
- Tatossian, Arthur; Cutting, John (1979). "The Phenomenology of Psychoses" (PDF). John Cutting.
- Scheler, Max; Cutting, John (30 July 2008). The Constitution of the Human Being: From the Posthumous Works, Volumes 11 and 12. Milwaukee, Wisconsin, USA: Marquette University Press. ISBN 978-0-87462-760-2. (Paperback)
