= Iain McGilchrist =

British psychiatrist and writer

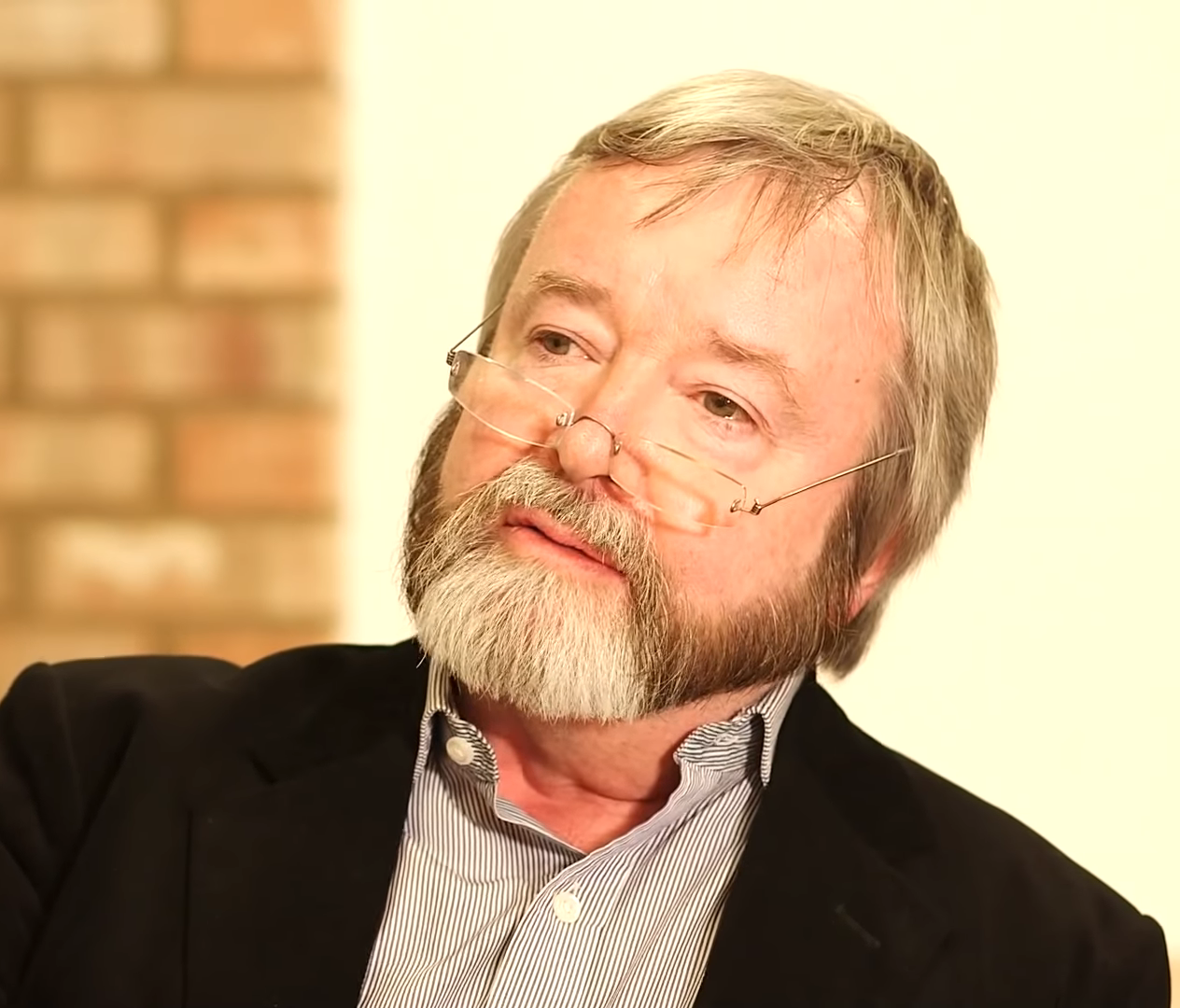
- McGilchrist in 2018
- Born: 1953 (age 72–73)
- Occupations: Psychiatrist, writer, lecturer
- Known for: The Master and His Emissary, The Matter with Things

Iain McGilchrist FRSA (born 1953) is a British psychiatrist, philosopher and neuroscientist who wrote the 2009 book The Master and His Emissary: The Divided Brain and the Making of the Western World.

He is a Quondam fellow of All Souls College, Oxford; a former associate fellow of Green Templeton College, Oxford; an emeritus consultant at the Maudsley and Bethlem Royal hospitals in south London, a former research fellow in Neuroimaging at Johns Hopkins University in Baltimore; and a former fellow of the Institute of Advanced Studies in Stellenbosch.

In 2021, McGilchrist published a book of neuroscience, epistemology and metaphysics called The Matter with Things.

== Life and education ==
McGilchrist was awarded a scholarship in the 1960s to Winchester College in the UK, followed by a scholarship to New College, Oxford. He read English there, and won the English Chancellor's Prize and the Charles Oldham Shakespeare Prize in 1974. He was then admitted to All Souls College, Oxford in 1975 as a Prize Fellow. During this time, he taught English Literature and researched philosophy and psychiatry, specifically investigating the mind-body relation. After this, he decided to pursue medicine and to train as a psychiatrist.

== Medical career ==
As a consulting psychiatrist at the Maudsley and Bethlem Royal hospitals, McGilchrist worked in the Epilepsy Unit, the National Psychosis Referral Unit and the National Eating Disorder Unit. He ultimately became the clinical director of their southern sector Acute Mental Health Services.

McGilchrist also contributed as a medical researcher. He produced work on neuroimaging in schizophrenia and on the philosophical phenomenology of that disorder, and published articles in the British Journal of Psychiatry, the American Journal of Psychiatry, Dialogues in Clinical Neuroscience, and the British Medical Journal.

He maintained academic contributions in the humanities, featuring work in the Times Literary Supplement, the London Review of Books, the Los Angeles Review of Books, Literary Review, the Wall Street Journal and the Sunday Times.

== Later life ==
In October 2025, McGilchrist was appointed Chancellor of Ralston College to succeed Jordan Peterson.

== Books ==
=== The Master and his Emissary: The Divided Brain and the Making of the Western World ===
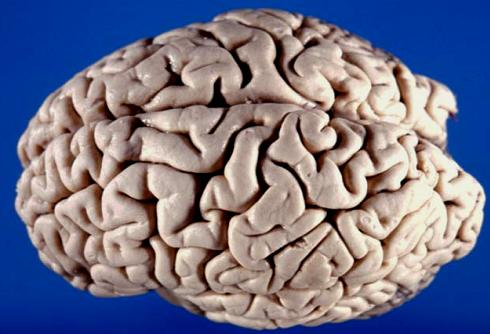
Superior-lateral view of the brain, showing left and right hemispheres.

McGilchrist's 2009 work, The Master and His Emissary sold over 200,000 copies. The book seeks to consolidate research in brain lateralisation. A major claim and focus of the book is the individual and cultural importance of the bi-hemisphere structure of the brain.

McGilchrist argues that the manner in which the two hemispheres operate is substantially different. It is not that the hemispheres perform different functions, but that they perform these functions in a different way. Drawing on neuroscientific research from the last one hundred years, McGilchrist argues that each hemisphere offers a unique kind of attention to the world, an attention which brings a certain version of the world into being. According to McGilchrist, we have become entranced by the version of the world brought into being by the left hemisphere and forgotten the insights produced by the right. We need both hemispheres, he concludes, but we need the left hemisphere to operate in the service of the right, we need the "emissary" left hemisphere to serve the "master" right hemisphere. The periods where the proper hemispheric balance has gone awry, McGilchrist documents in the second half of the book where he offers a history of ideas seen through the lens of the hemisphere hypothesis.

Following the publication of The Master and His Emissary, McGilchrist took part in radio sessions, television programmes, numerous podcasts and interviews via YouTube with figures such as Sam Harris, Rowan Williams and John Cleese. There has been a Canadian feature film made about his second book, The Master and his Emissary, titled the Divided Brain.

=== The Matter with Things: Our Brains, Our Delusions and the Unmaking of the World ===
McGilchrist's 2021 The Matter with Things book, published by Perspectiva Press, explores the metaphysical implications of the "hemisphere hypothesis". In this book he consolidates the latest neuroscientific evidence concerning (1) our means to truth (perception, attention, judgement, apprehension, among others); (2) the paths that we ordinarily take to truth (reason, science, logic) and other equally important paths such as intuition and imagination, and (3) the implications of this for the reality that is revealed. In the final sections, he attempts to make some headway in answering such fundamental questions as: What is space and time? What is matter and consciousness? What is value? Is a sense of the sacred baked into the world?

His main target in this book is scientific materialism, i.e. a view that the world is nothing but inert atoms, blankly colliding against one another in a predictable pattern. In place of this, McGilchrist seeks to reawaken a richer conception of reality, a conception revealed when our hemispheres return to their proper asymmetric relation.

=== Future work ===
McGilchrist has been commissioned by Oxford University Press to write a book of reflections on the humanities and sciences, to offer a critique of contemporary culture from the standpoint of neuropsychiatry, and to deliver an investigation into what is revealed by the paintings of those with psychotic illnesses.

== Selected works ==
- McGilchrist, Iain (24 May 1982). Against Criticism. London, England: Faber and Faber. ISBN 0-571-11922-0. (Hardcover)
- McGilchrist, I.; Cutting, J. (1995). "Somatic delusions in schizophrenia and the affective psychoses". British Journal of Psychiatry. 167 (3). Royal College of Psychiatrists: 350–361. doi:10.1192/bjp.167.3.350. PMID 7496644. S2CID 10976749.
- McGilchrist, Iain (June 2009). "A Problem of Symmetries". Philosophy, Psychiatry, & Psychology. 16 (2). The Johns Hopkins University Press: 161–169. doi:10.1353/ppp.0.0236 (inactive 12 July 2025). E-ISSN 1086-3303. Print ISSN 1071-6076.
- McGilchrist, Iain (9 October 2009). The Master and His Emissary: The Divided Brain and the Making of the Western World. USA: Yale University Press. ISBN 978-0-300-14878-7. (Hardcover)
- McGilchrist, Iain (15 July 2012). The Divided Brain and the Search for Meaning. New Haven, Connecticut: Yale University Press. ISBN 978-1781815335. (Kindle ebook)
- McGilchrist, Iain (27 July 2018). Ways of Attending: How our Divided Brain Constructs the World. Abingdon-on-Thames, England: Routledge. ISBN 978-1781815335. (Paperback)
- McGilchrist, Iain (9 November 2021). The Matter with Things: Our Brains, Our Delusions, and the Unmaking of the World. UK: Perspectiva Press. ISBN 978-1-914568-06-0. (Hardcover, 2 volumes)

== See also ==
- Eating disorders
- Epilepsy
- Mental health
