= Robert E. Ornstein =

American psychologist, researcher and author

Robert Evan Ornstein
- Born: August 21, 1942; Brooklyn, New York
- Died: December 20, 2018 (aged 76)
- Education: BA in psychology, City University of New York's Queens College; PhD, Stanford University
- Alma mater: Queens College, City University of New York, USA
- Occupations: Psychologist, researcher and author
- Spouse: Sally Mallam
- Writing career
- Pen name: Robert E. Ornstein, Robert Ornstein
- Language: English
- Genre: Psychology
- Subjects: Scientific research into the mind, consciousness, split-brain; wisdom traditions such as Sufism

Robert Evan Ornstein (August 21, 1942 – December 20, 2018) was an American psychologist, researcher and author.

He taught at the Langley Porter Neuropsychiatric Institute, based at the University of California Medical Center in San Francisco, and was professor at Stanford University and founder and chairman of the Institute for the Study of Human Knowledge (ISHK).

== Life ==
=== Early life and education ===
Robert Evan Ornstein was born in 1942 in Brooklyn, New York, USA, and grew up in the city. He was twice high school math champion in a city-wide contest, and "wavered between physics and poetry before compromising on psychology" at the City University of New York's Queens College.

In 1964 he was awarded a bachelor's degree in psychology at Queens College, and went on to gain a PhD at Stanford University, California in 1968. His doctoral thesis was On the Experience of Time.

=== Career ===
Ornstein was involved in reconciling the scientific understanding of mind and consciousness with other scientific and cultural traditions. His work has been featured in a 1974 Time magazine article entitled Hemispheric Thinker.

In 1969 Ornstein founded the Institute for the Study of Human Knowledge (ISHK) an educational 501(c) (3) non-profit organization dedicated to cross-cultural understanding and to bringing important research on human nature to the general public, most recently The Human Journey website. He was the President of ISHK until his death.

Ornstein's book The Right Mind deals with split-brain studies and other experiments or clinical evidence revealing the abilities of the right cerebral hemisphere.

He also wrote on the brain's role in health in The Healing Brain with David Sobel of Kaiser Permanente; the way in which human consciousness is unable to understand the fast-paced modern world in New World New Mind: Moving Toward Conscious Evolution with Paul Ehrlich; and the way in which our current consciousness has developed in The Axemaker's Gift, with James Burke, a book that addressed the way in which Western culture has developed and our minds along with it.

Ornstein worked to reconcile the wisdom traditions of the East and science in The Psychology of Consciousness and was interested in promoting the modern Sufism of Idries Shah. Shah and Ornstein met in the 1960s. Ornstein's The Psychology of Consciousness (1972) was enthusiastically received by the academic psychology community, as it coincided with new interests in the field, such as the study of biofeedback and other techniques designed to achieve shifts in mood and awareness.

The Psychology of Consciousness and The Evolution of Consciousness introduced the two modes of consciousness of the left and right brain hemispheres and a critical understanding of how the brain evolved. Ornstein considered these, along with his latest book, God 4.0: On the Nature of Higher Consciousness and the Experience Called "God", his most important writings. The three books together provide a fundamental reconsideration of ancient religious and spiritual traditions in the light of advances in brain science and psychology, exploring the potential and relevance of this knowledge to contemporary needs and to our shared future.

=== Death ===
Robert Ornstein died on December 20, 2018. He is survived by his wife, Sally Mallam; his brother Alan Ornstein; sister-in-law Rachel Hawk, and niece Jessie Ornstein.

== Partial bibliography ==
=== Books written ===
- On the Experience of Time (Penguin Books, 1969)
- The Psychology of Consciousness (Harcourt Brace, 1972). ISBN 0670581984
  - 4th rev. ed. (Penguin Books, 1986)
- On the Psychology of Meditation, coauthor to Claudio Naranjo (Allen & Unwin, 1973)
- The Mind Field (Viking Press, 1976)
  - paperback (Malor Books, 1996)
- The Amazing Brain, with Richard F. Thompson (Houghton Mifflin Company, 1984)
- Multimind (Houghton Mifflin Company, 1986)
- The Healing Brain, with David Sobel (Simon & Schuster, 1987). ISBN 0671619454
- New World, New Mind: Moving Towards Conscious Evolution, co-authored with Paul R. Ehrlich (Methuen, 1989)
- The Evolution of Consciousness, illustrated by Ted Dewan (Prentice-Hall US, 1991)
- The Roots of the Self, illustrated by Ted Dewan (HarperCollins US, 1993)
- The Axemaker’s Gift, with James Burke, illustrated by Ted Dewan (G. P. Putnam's Sons US, 1995)
- The Right Mind: Making Sense of the Hemispheres (Harcourt Brace & Company, 1997)
- MindReal: How the Mind Creates its Own Virtual Reality illustrated by Ted Dewan (Malor Books, 2008)
- Humanity on a Tightrope: Thoughts on Empathy, Family, and Big Changes for a Viable Future co-author Paul R. Ehrlich (Rowman & Littlefield Publishers, 2010))
- God 4.0: On the Nature of Higher Consciousness and the Experience Called "God", with Sally M. Ornstein (Malor Books, 2021)

=== Books edited ===
- Ornstein, Robert E., ed. (4 March 1974). The Nature of Human Consciousness (A Book of Readings). New York, USA: Viking Adult. ISBN 0-670-50480-7. (Hardcover)
- Ornstein, Robert E.; Swencionis, Charles, eds. (15 March 1991). The Healing Brain: A Scientific Reader. New York, USA: The Guilford Press. ISBN 0-89862-463-0. (Paperback)

=== Academic monographs ===
- Physiological Studies of Consciousness (Institute for Cultural Research, 1973)

== See also ==
- Cerebral hemisphere
- Lateralization of brain function
- The Idries Shah Foundation
- The Master and His Emissary
- The Matter with Things
