= Ellen Stiefler =

American agent, producer, and lawyer (born 1958)

- Born: June 4, 1958 (age 68); New York City, New York, U.S.
- Education: Duke University (BS); University of Miami (JD); Oxford University
- Occupations: agent, producer, lawyer

Ellen Weiler Stiefler (born June 4, 1958) is an American agent, producer, and lawyer. She manages talent and intellectual property rights across media.

== Career ==
Stiefler is president of Stiefler Law Group and Transmedia Multiverse. She has represented authors and public figures including Dr. Jill Bolte Taylor, Dr. Mimi Guarneri, Dr. Marianne Legato, Dr. Andrew Baldwin, Dina Babbitt, Sylvia Earle, Mary Mazzio, the independent film company 50 Eggs, and its film TEN9EIGHT, which tells the story of kids from low-income communities who discovered the power of entrepreneurship, and The Apple Pushers, which highlights the issue of food deserts and chronicles the lives and livelihoods of immigrant street vendors who are micro-entrepreneurs, rolling carts of fresh fruits and vegetables into poor neighborhoods where obesity rates were skyrocketing, Anne McCaffrey among others.

== Education ==
Before embarking on her career protecting and promoting creative properties, Stiefler pursued studies in music and the violin at The Juilliard School, was graduated from The Brearley School in New York City, Duke University and the University of Miami School of Law, and also studied international and comparative law at Oxford University.

== Speaking and media projects ==
Stiefler is also a speaker on growing Transmedia businesses, law and the media, and she is an expert on publishing, transmedia and intellectual property law issues. "Ellen Stiefler is a celebrity of sorts on LinkedIn. The San Diego–based intellectual property attorney is listed as the top expert in the networking site's legal community, based on the frequency and helpfulness of the answers she provides to users' posted questions. Her feedback has touched on issues such as proving the theft of intellectual property, fighting slander and copyrighting a new software concept."

Transmedia Multiverse has a talent management division, Transmedia Agency, a speakers bureau, Transmedia Speakers, and divisions that develop and produce stories and content across all major media, including books, television, movies, webcasts and podcasts. Stiefler has helped pioneer several new media formats, including Enhanced Ebooks that add media elements such as visuals and interactive features and she helping TED conferences create TED Books.

One of Stiefler's transmedia properties is Dr. Mimi Guarneri and her pioneering work in integrative and holistic medicine. Dr. Guarneri's 24 DVD Great Course on the science of natural healing was published by the Teaching Company in October 2012. Her book, The Heart Speaks, was published by Simon & Schuster in 2006. The Heart Speaks is being adapted into a weekly one-hour medical drama on ABC television with Sony Pictures Television, Vin Di Bona, Bruce Gersh, Susan Levison and writer Yahlin Chang, and Ellen Stiefler executive producing,.

Another of Stiefler's Transmedia projects is My Stroke of Insight, by Dr. Jill Bolte Taylor, a TED Talk seen by over 25 million people, a bestselling book translated into over 30 languages, opera, stage productions, documentaries around the world, musical performances, a ballet and a major, full-length feature film. The film adaptation of Taylor's memoir is being penned by screenwriter Semi Chellas and will be distributed by Columbia Pictures, a division of Sony Pictures Entertainment, produced by Academy Award winning producer, Brian Grazer, and directed by Academy Award winning director Ron Howard, with Stiefler as executive producer.

Another Stiefler transmedia project is the story of Nazi holocaust survivor, artist Dina Babbitt which gave rise to United States legislation, a short film, "The Last Outrage" by Disney Educational Productions, a graphic novel by Neal Adams and is being turned into a book and film.

Stiefler was a founding board member of Scripps Center for Integrative Medicine Scripps Health – Integrative Medicine and Kids Korps USA Kids Korps USA – Developing Leaders For Life Through Youth Volunteerism and continued to serve on those boards for over a decade. She also serves as an advisor and board member to other civic and charitable organizations as well as a number of for-profit companies. She founded The Gratitude Foundation in 2003 .
