= Lateralization of brain function =

Specialization of some cognitive functions in one side of the brain

The human brain is divided into two hemispheres–left and right. Scientists continue to explore how some cognitive functions tend to be dominated by one side or the other; that is, how they are lateralized. Right cerebral hemisphere Left cerebral hemisphere

The lateralization of brain function (or hemispheric dominance or lateralization) is the tendency for some neural functions or cognitive processes to be specialized to one side of the brain or the other. The median longitudinal fissure separates the human brain into two distinct cerebral hemispheres connected by the corpus callosum. Both hemispheres exhibit brain asymmetries in both structure and neuronal network composition associated with specialized function.

Lateralization of brain structures has been studied using both healthy and split-brain patients. However, there are numerous counterexamples to each generalization and each human's brain develops differently, leading to unique lateralization in individuals. This is different from specialization, as lateralization refers only to the function of one structure divided between two hemispheres. Specialization is much easier to observe as a trend, since it has a stronger anthropological history.

The best example of an established lateralization is that of Broca's and Wernicke's areas, where both are often found exclusively on the left hemisphere in the vast majority of people. Function lateralization, such as semantics, intonation, accentuation, and prosody, has since been called into question and largely been found to have a neuronal basis in both hemispheres. Another example is that each hemisphere in the brain tends to represent one side of the body. In the cerebellum, this is the ipsilateral side, but in the forebrain this is predominantly the contralateral side.

== Lateralized functions ==
=== Language and speech ===
Language functions are lateralized to the left hemisphere in 96% of right-handers and 60% of left-handers.. The release of dopamine seems to regulate the activity in speech motor cortex and drive dominance in the left hemisphere.

Meaning of words, called lexicon, is processed bilaterally which has been tested through the word superiority effect. This finding is consistent with the distributed memory and knowledge systems required for lexical entries; however, each hemisphere's lexicon is considered unique since it may be organized and accessed differently. For example, the right hemisphere lacks letter recognition, and cannot judge lexical relationships such as superordinate words or antonyms.

The permitted organization of words, called grammar, is lateralized in only one hemisphere, typically the left one. These functions include "understanding verbs, pluralizations, the possessive, and active-passive differences" and understanding changes in meaning due to word order. However, the right hemisphere is able to judge when a sentence is grammatically correct, which may indicate that patterns of speech are learned by rote rather than applied through understanding rules.

Speech production and language comprehension are specialized in Broca's and Wernicke's areas respectively, which are located in the left hemisphere for 96% of right-handers and 70% of left-handers. However, there are some cases in which speech is produced in both hemispheres in split-brain patients; lateralization can also shift due to plasticity over time. The emotional content of language, called emotional prosody, is right-lateralized.

In writing, studies attempting to isolate the linguistic component of written language in terms of brain lateralization could not provide enough evidence of a difference in the relative activation of the brain hemispheres between left-handed and right-handed adults.

=== Sensory processing ===
Sensory processing for the left and right sides of the body is often lateralized to the contralateral hemisphere due to nerve fiber decussation.

Because of the functional division of the left and right sides of the body, the processing of information in the sensory cortices is essentially identical. That is, the processing of visual and auditory stimuli, spatial manipulation, facial perception, and artistic ability are represented bilaterally. Numerical estimation, comparison and online calculation depend on bilateral parietal regions while exact calculation and fact retrieval are associated with left parietal regions, perhaps due to their ties to linguistic processing.

==== Vision ====
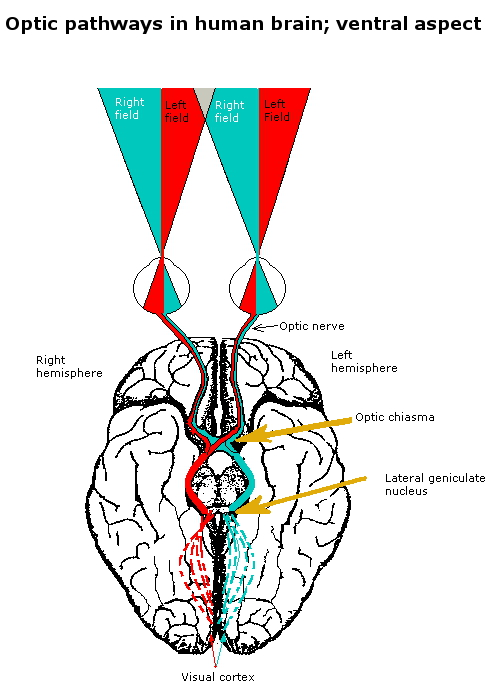
Lateralization of the left and right visual hemifields due to decussation.

In vision, retinal ganglion cells undergo partial decussation at the optic chiasm, where axons from the nasal retinas cross to the opposite hemisphere, while axons from the temporal retinas remain on the ipsilateral side. As a result, visual input from the left visual hemifields are processed by the right hemisphere's visual cortex, while input from the right visual hemifields are processed by the left hemisphere's visual cortex.

==== Hearing ====
In hearing, spiral ganglion neurons in the vestibulocochlear nerve project to the ipsilateral cochlear nuclei in the medulla. However, second-order axons from the ventral cochlear nucleus branch to both the ipsilateral and contralateral superior olivary complexes. Consequently, hearing is strongly lateralized only at the ipsilateral cochlear nuclei, while further processing in the inferior colliculi, the medial geniculate nucleus of the thalamus, and the auditory cortex occurs bilaterally with a slight contralateral dominance. This lateralization explains why damage to one cochlear nucleus causes deafness in the ipsilateral ear, whereas damage above the cochlear nucleus typically results in only slight hearing loss.

When tasked to repeat words in a dichotic listening task, individuals tend to say words played in their right ear, a phenomenon called right-ear advantage. Since hearing is slightly contralateral dominant, this effect is consistent with the left hemisphere lateralization of language. When tasked to recall melodies in a dichotic listening task, people instead tend to have a left-ear advantage.

==== Touch ====
In the somatosensory system, sensations of touch, vibration, pressure, pain, and temperature are primarily processed in the contralateral somatosensory cortex of the brain. Mechanoreceptors responsible for touch and vibration transmit signals through the dorsal column-medial lemniscal pathway, where they decussate at the dorsal column nuclei in the medulla before ascending. Touch from the face and top of the head follows the trigeminal touch pathway, where second-order neurons decussate at the trigeminal nucleus.

Pain and temperature signals from nociceptors travel a different pathway, the spinothalamic pathway, where second-order neurons decussate earlier in the spinal cord. For pain and temperature in the face and top of the head, second-order neurons decussate at the spinal trigeminal nucleus of the brainstem. The earlier decussation of pain signals compared to touch explains Brown-Séquard syndrome, a condition in which damage to one half of the spinal cord leads to ipsilateral insensitivity to touch but contralateral insensitivity to pain and temperature.

=== Motor system ===
Voluntary movement is lateralized to the contralateral motor cortex, so the right hemisphere controls the left side of the body, while the left hemisphere controls the right side.

In the two lateral pathways, the corticospinal tract is responsible for control of distal muscles and begins at the contralateral motor cortex or contralateral somatosensory areas, and decussates between the medulla and spinal cord. The rubrospinal tract responsible for distal muscle and posture begins at the contralateral red nucleus and quickly decussates in the pons.

In the four ventromedial pathways, the vestibulospinal tract responsible for head balance begins at the ipsilateral vestibular nucleus of the medulla and splits into a bilateral and ipsilateral path. The bilateral path controls neck and back muscles for head balance, while the ipsilateral path maintains upright posture of the legs. The tectospinal tract responsible for orienting the head toward sensory stimuli begins at the contralateral superior colliculus and quickly decussates at the red nucleus. The reticulospinal tracts responsible for controlling muscles against gravity begin at the ipsilateral reticular formation and do not decussate.

=== Value systems ===
Rather than just being a series of places where different brain modules occur, there are running similarities in the kind of function seen in each side, for instance how right-side impairment of drawing ability making patients draw the parts of the subject matter with wholly incoherent relationships, or where the kind of left-side damage seen in language impairment not damaging the patient's ability to catch the significance of intonation in speech. This has led British psychiatrist Iain McGilchrist to view the two hemispheres as having different value systems, where the left hemisphere tends to reduce complex matters such as ethics to rules and measures, and the right hemisphere is disposed to the holistic and metaphorical.

== Clinical significance ==
Depression is linked with a hyperactive right hemisphere, with evidence of selective involvement in "processing negative emotions, pessimistic thoughts and unconstructive thinking styles", as well as vigilance, arousal and self-reflection, and a relatively hypoactive left hemisphere, "specifically involved in processing pleasurable experiences" and "relatively more involved in decision-making processes". Additionally, "left hemisphere lesions result in an omissive response bias or error pattern whereas right hemisphere lesions result in a commissive response bias or error pattern." The delusional misidentification syndromes, reduplicative paramnesia and Capgras delusion are also often the result of right hemisphere lesions.

=== Hemisphere damage ===
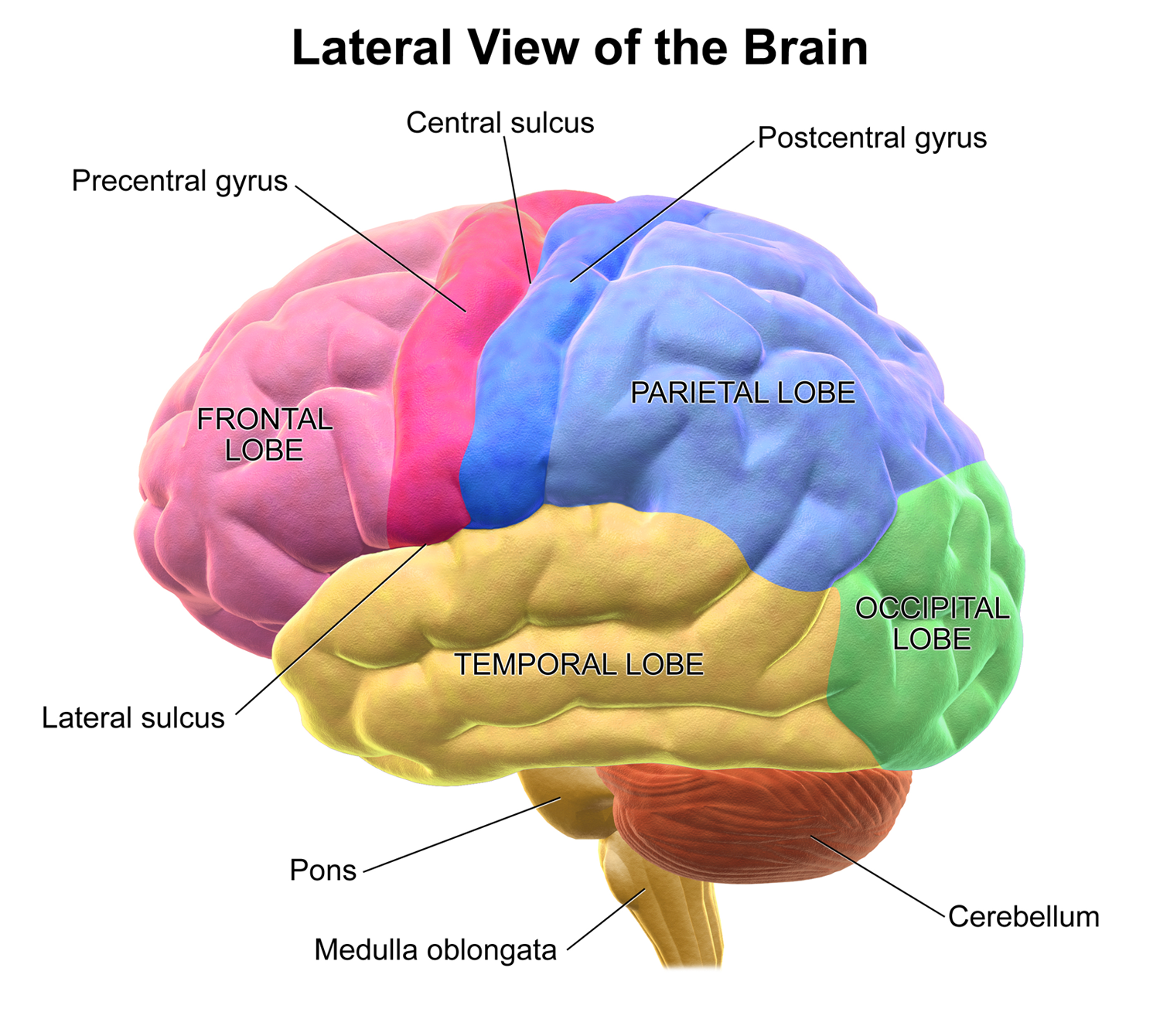
Lateral view of the Brain

Damage to either the right or left hemisphere, and its resulting deficits provide insight into the function of the damaged area. There is truth to the idea that some brain functions reside more on one side of the brain than the other. We know this in part from what is lost when a stroke affects a particular part of the brain. Left hemisphere damage has many effects on language production and perception. Damage or lesions to the right hemisphere can result in a lack of emotional prosody or intonation when speaking. The left hemisphere is often involved with dealing of detail-oriented perception while the right hemisphere deals mostly with wholeness or an overall concept of things.

Right hemisphere damage also has grave effects on understanding discourse. People with damage to the right hemisphere have a reduced ability to generate inferences, comprehend and produce main concepts, and a reduced ability to manage alternative meanings. Furthermore, people with right hemisphere damage often exhibit discourse that is abrupt and perfunctory or verbose and excessive. They can also have pragmatic deficits in situations of turn taking, topic maintenance and shared knowledge. . Although both sides of the hemisphere has different responsibilities and tasks, they both complete each other and create a bigger picture. Lateral brain damage can also affect visual perceptual spatial resolution. People with left hemisphere damage may have impaired perception of high resolution, or detailed, aspects of an image. People with right hemisphere damage may have impaired perception of low resolution, or big picture, aspects of an image.

=== Plasticity ===
If a specific region of the brain, or even an entire hemisphere, is injured or destroyed, its functions can sometimes be assumed by a neighboring region in the same hemisphere or the corresponding region in the other hemisphere, depending upon the area damaged and the patient's age. When injury interferes with pathways from one area to another, alternative (indirect) connections may develop to communicate information with detached areas, despite the inefficiencies.

=== Broca's aphasia ===
Broca's aphasia is a specific type of expressive aphasia and is so named due to the aphasia that results from damage or lesions to the Broca's area of the brain, that exists most commonly in the left inferior frontal hemisphere. Thus, the aphasia that develops from the lack of functioning of the Broca's area is an expressive and non-fluent aphasia. It is called 'non-fluent' due to the issues that arise because Broca's area is critical for language pronunciation and production. The area controls some motor aspects of speech production and articulation of thoughts to words and as such lesions to the area result in specific non-fluent aphasia.

=== Wernicke's aphasia ===
Wernicke's aphasia is the result of damage to the area of the brain that is commonly in the left hemisphere above the Sylvian fissure. Damage to this area causes primarily a deficit in language comprehension.While the ability to speak fluently with normal melodic intonation is spared, the language produced by a person with Wernicke's aphasia is riddled with semantic errors and may sound nonsensical to the listener.Wernicke's aphasia is characterized by phonemic paraphasias, neologism or jargon.Another characteristic of a person with Wernicke's aphasia is that they are unconcerned by the mistakes that they are making.

== Misconceptions ==
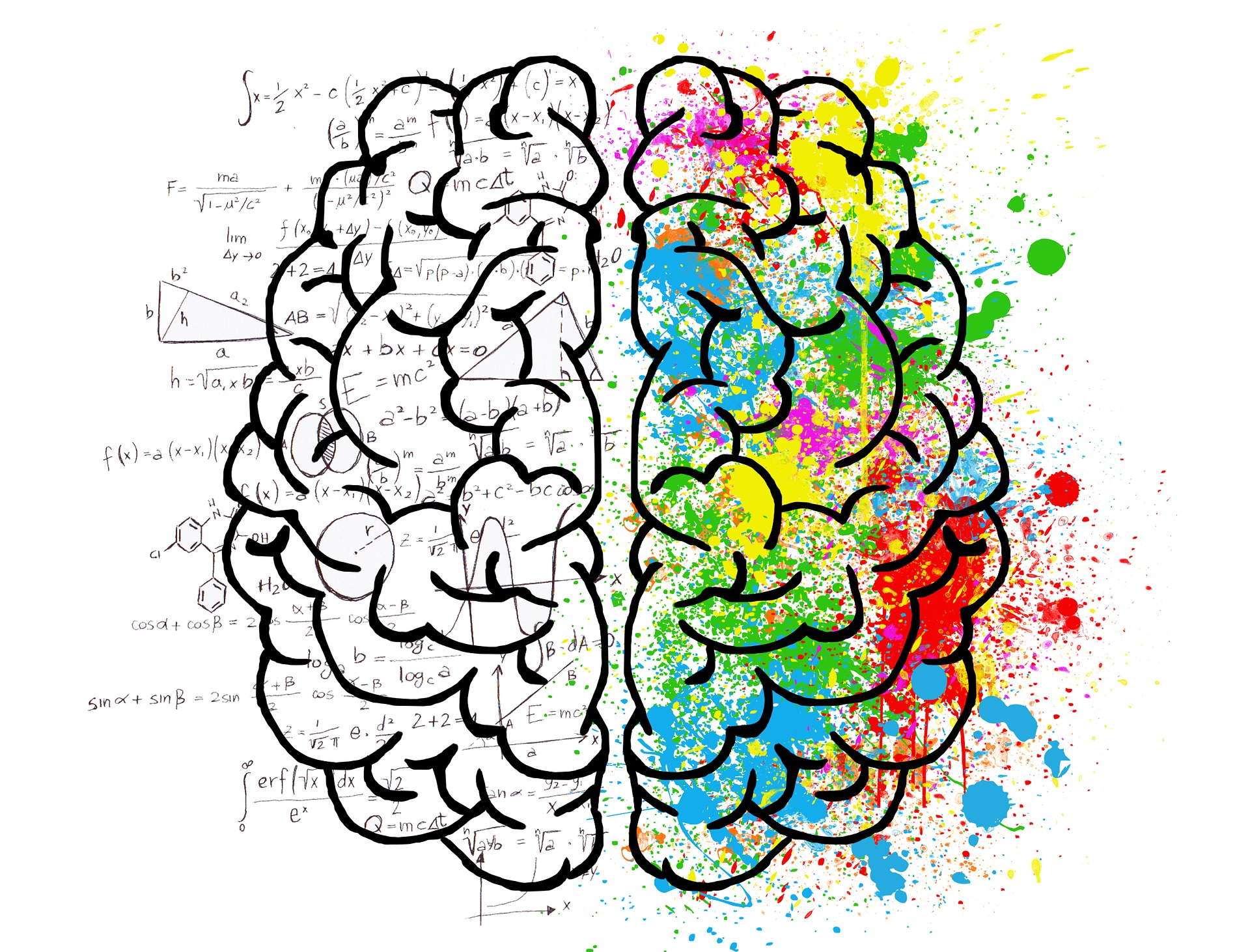
An illustration of the oversimplified model of hemisphericity

The concept of "right-brained" or "left-brained" individuals is considered a widespread myth which oversimplifies the true nature of the brain's cerebral hemispheres. According to this view, traits associated with intuition and creativity are located in the right side of the brain, while traits associated with rationality are located in the left hemisphere. Although certain functions show a degree of lateralization in the brain—with language predominantly processed in the left hemisphere, and spatial and nonverbal reasoning in the right—these functions are not exclusively tied to one hemisphere. A study from the University of Utah in 2013 found that brain scans revealed similarity on both sides of the brain, personality and environmental factors aside.

Terence Hines states that the research on brain lateralization is valid as a research program, though commercial promoters have applied it to promote subjects and products far outside the implications of the research. For example, the implications of the research have no bearing on psychological interventions such as eye movement desensitization and reprocessing (EMDR) and neurolinguistic programming, brain-training equipment, or management training.

=== Popular psychology ===
Oversimplification of lateralization in pop psychology. This belief was widely held even in the scientific community for some years.

Some popularizations oversimplify the science about lateralization, by presenting the functional differences between hemispheres as being more absolute than is actually the case. Interestingly, research has shown quite opposite function of brain lateralisation, i.e. right hemisphere creatively and chaotically links between concepts and left hemisphere tends to adhere to specific date and time, although generally adhering to the pattern of left-brain as linguistic interpretation and right brain as spatio-temporal.

=== Sex differences ===
In the 19th century and to a lesser extent the 20th, it was thought that each side of the brain was associated with a specific gender: the left corresponding with masculinity and the right with femininity and each half could function independently. The right side of the brain was seen as the inferior and thought to be prominent in women, savages, children, criminals, and the insane. A prime example of this in fictional literature can be seen in Robert Louis Stevenson's Strange Case of Dr. Jekyll and Mr. Hyde.

== History ==
=== Broca ===
One of the first indications of brain function lateralization resulted from the research of French physician Pierre Paul Broca, in 1861. His research involved the male patient nicknamed "Tan", who had a speech deficit (aphasia); "tan" was one of the few words he could articulate, hence his nickname. In Tan's autopsy, Broca determined he had a syphilitic lesion in the left cerebral hemisphere. This left frontal lobe brain area (Broca's area) is an important speech production region. The motor aspects of speech production deficits caused by damage to Broca's area are known as expressive aphasia. In clinical assessment of this type of aphasia, patients have difficulty producing speech.

=== Wernicke ===
German physician Karl Wernicke continued in the vein of Broca's research by studying language deficits unlike expressive aphasia. Wernicke noted that not every deficit was in speech production; some were linguistic. He found that damage to the left posterior, superior temporal gyrus (Wernicke's area) caused language comprehension deficits rather than speech production deficits, a syndrome known as receptive aphasia.

=== Imaging ===
These seminal works on hemispheric specialization were done on patients or postmortem brains, raising questions about the potential impact of pathology on the research findings. New methods permit the in vivo comparison of the hemispheres in healthy subjects. Particularly, magnetic resonance imaging (MRI) and positron emission tomography (PET) are important because of their high spatial resolution and ability to image subcortical brain structures.

=== Movement and sensation ===
In the 1940s, neurosurgeon Wilder Penfield and his neurologist colleague Herbert Jasper developed a technique of brain mapping to help reduce side effects caused by surgery to treat epilepsy. They stimulated motor and somatosensory cortices of the brain with small electrical currents to activate discrete brain regions. They found that stimulation of one hemisphere's motor cortex produces muscle contraction on the opposite side of the body. Furthermore, the functional map of the motor and sensory cortices is fairly consistent from person to person; Penfield and Jasper's famous pictures of the motor and sensory homunculi were the result.

=== Split-brain patients ===
Research by Michael Gazzaniga and Roger Wolcott Sperry in the 1960s on split-brain patients led to an even greater understanding of functional laterality. Split-brain patients are patients who have undergone corpus callosotomy (usually as a treatment for severe epilepsy), a severing of a large part of the corpus callosum. The corpus callosum connects the two hemispheres of the brain and allows them to communicate. When these connections are cut, the two halves of the brain have a reduced capacity to communicate with each other. This led to many interesting behavioral phenomena that allowed Gazzaniga and Sperry to study the contributions of each hemisphere to various cognitive and perceptual processes. One of their main findings was that the right hemisphere was capable of rudimentary language processing, but often has no lexical or grammatical abilities. Eran Zaidel also studied such patients and found some evidence for the right hemisphere having at least some syntactic ability.

Language is primarily localized in the left hemisphere. While the left hemisphere has proven to be more optimized for language, the right hemisphere has the capacity with emotions, such as sarcasm, that can express prosody in sentences when speaking. According to Sheppard and Hillis, "The right hemisphere is critical for perceiving sarcasm (Davis et al., 2016), integrating context required for understanding metaphor, inference, and humour, as well as recognizing and expressing affective or emotional prosody—changes in pitch, rhythm, rate, and loudness that convey emotions". One of the experiments carried out by Gazzaniga involved a split-brain male patient sitting in front of a computer screen while having words and images presented on either side of the screen, and the visual stimuli would go to either the right or left visual field, and thus the left or right brain, respectively. It was observed that if the patient was presented with an image to his left visual field (right brain), he would report not seeing anything. If he was able to feel around for certain objects, he could accurately pick out the correct object, despite not having the ability to verbalize what he saw.

== Additional images ==
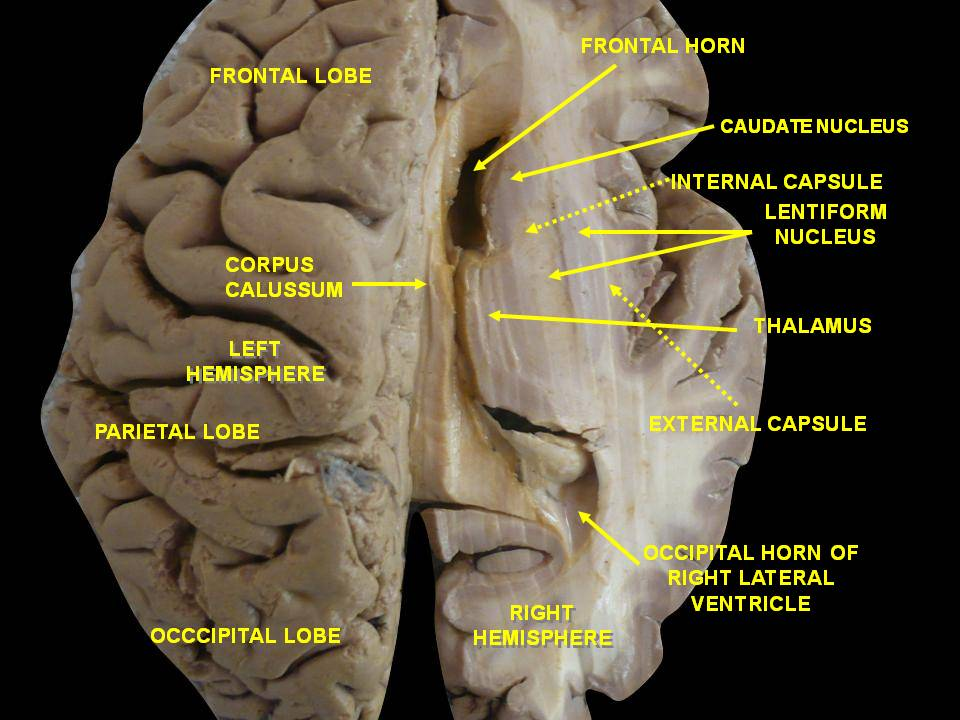
Ventricles of brain and basal ganglia. Superior view. Horizontal section. Deep dissection

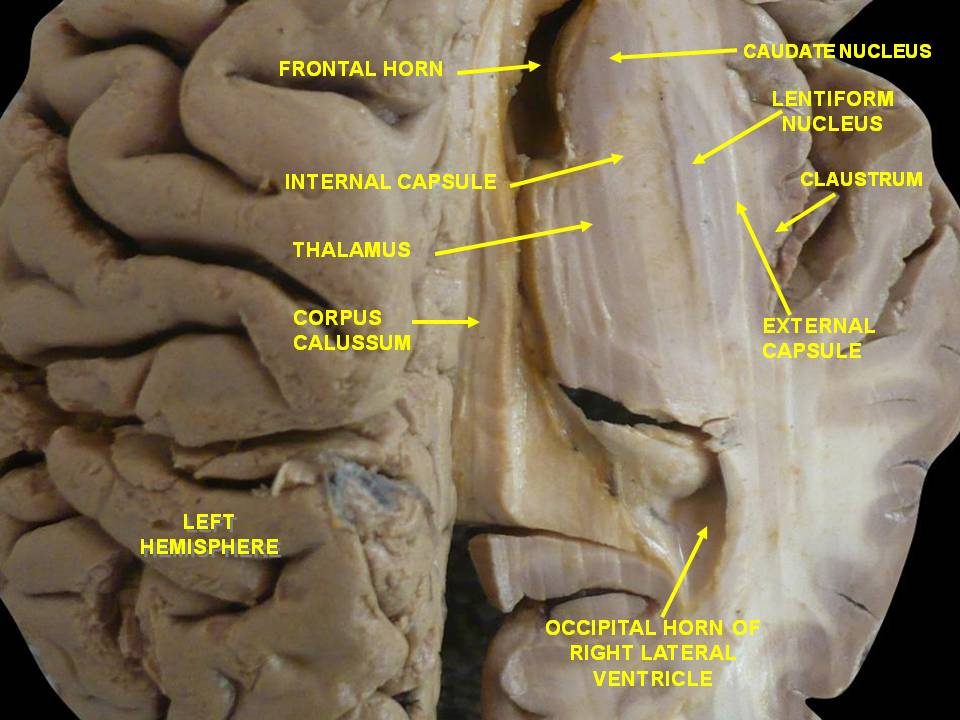
Ventricles of brain and basal ganglia. Superior view. Horizontal section. Deep dissection

== In other animals ==
Although brain lateralization was once thought to be unique to humans, this is now known not to be the case. In fact, most vertebrate species that have been studied exhibit it to some extent, with the general pattern being that “the left hemisphere is used to categorize stimuli and control established behavior with focused attention, whereas the right hemisphere is specialized to respond to novel and threatening stimuli (e.g., predators), to control escape responses and to express intense emotions”. Brain asymmetry has also been observed in some invertebrates, but this may not be homologous to the vertebrate case.

The bonobo brain exhibits slightly greater overall asymmetry than the chimpanzee brain.

In pets, “left-pawed” and “right-pawed” individuals show different behavioral traits, with the former showing greater susceptibility to fear and stress. Puppies that were exposed to stressful situations early in life were observed to shift their preference to using the left paw, which corresponds to dominance of the right brain hemisphere (which is also correlated with negative emotions).

Animals with more weakly lateralized brains show more difficulty with multitasking.

== See also ==
- Functional specialization (brain)
- Alien hand syndrome
- Ambidexterity
- Bicameral mentality
- Brain asymmetry
- Chirality
- Contralateral brain
- Cross-dominance
- Divided consciousness
- Dual consciousness
- Emotional lateralization
- Handedness
- Hemispherectomy
- Laterality
- Left brain interpreter
- The Master and His Emissary
- Parallel computing
- Psychoneuroimmunology
- Right hemisphere brain damage
- Of Two Minds (book)
- Wada test
- Yakovlevian torque

== Bibliography ==
- McGilchrist I (9 October 2009). The Master and His Emissary: The Divided Brain and the Making of the Western World (Hardcover ed.). US: Yale University Press. ISBN 978-0-300-14878-7.
- Ocklenburg, Sebastian; Güntürkün, Onur (2024). The Lateralized Brain. doi:10.1016/C2021-0-02209-4. ISBN 978-0-323-99737-9.

== Further resources ==
- Josse G, Tzourio-Mazoyer N (January 2004). "Hemispheric specialization for language". Brain Research. Brain Research Reviews. 44 (1): 1–12. doi:10.1016/j.brainresrev.2003.10.001. PMID 14739000.
- Cutting J (2012). A Critique of Psychopathology. Parodos Verlag. ISBN 978-3-938880-51-7.
- Ornstein R (1998). The Right Mind: Making Sense of the Hemispheres. Harcourt Brace International. ISBN 978-0-15-600627-9.
- Taylor, Jill Bolte (2008). My Stroke of Insight: A Brain Scientist's Personal Journey. Viking. ISBN 978-0-670-02074-4.
