= The Matter with Things =

2021 book on neuroscience and epistemology by Iain McGilchrist

- Front covers of The Matter with Things
- Author: Iain McGilchrist
- Language: English
- Genre: Psychology, neuroscience, philosophy of mind, philosophy, sociocultural evolution
- Publisher: Perspectiva Press
- Publication date: 9 November 2021
- Publication place: United States and United Kingdom
- Media type: Print (Hardcover and Paperback, 2 volumes) and Digital (Ebook)
- Pages: 1500
- ISBN: 978-1914568060 (Hardcover edition)
- Preceded by: The Master and His Emissary

The Matter with Things: Our Brains, Our Delusions, and the Unmaking of the World is a 2021 book of neuroscience, epistemology and metaphysics written by psychiatrist, thinker and former literary scholar Iain McGilchrist.

Following on from McGilchrist's 2009 work, The Master and His Emissary: The Divided Brain and the Making of the Western World, The Matter with Things explores the radically different ways in which the two hemispheres of the brain apprehend reality, and the many cognitive and worldly implications of this.

The book "is an attempt to convey a way of looking at the world quite different from the one that has largely dominated the West for at least three hundred and fifty years [i.e. since the Scientific Revolution and the Enlightenment] – some would say as long as two thousand years."

== Overview ==
The work is 1,500 pages long and divided into two volumes – "The Ways to Truth" and "What Then is True?" – with many scientific, philosophical and literary quotations, citations and footnotes, and several appendices. The bibliography alone is 180 pages long.

=== Basic premise: The divided brain ===
Cerebral hemispheres.

McGilchrist distances himself from the discourse about the left brain–right brain divide in pop psychology, emphasising that "just about everything that is said about the hemispheres in pop psychology is wrong because it rests on beliefs about what the hemispheres do, not about how they approach it."

One of the fundamental differences between the hemispheres of the human brain (and that of other species, such as birds), according to McGilchrist, is that the left hemisphere has evolved to sharply focus its attention on detail; it breaks things apart and tends to deal in abstractions, the explicit, and "either/or" (differentiation). The right hemisphere, on the other hand, has a broad and flexible attention that is open to whatever possibilities come along, and it sees things in their wider context, appreciates the implicit, and favours "both/and" (integration, holism). The right hemisphere has a better appreciation of itself and the left, than the left has of the right. Both approaches are necessary and complementary, but the left hemisphere's operation should not dominate the right. It makes "a good servant, but a very poor master."

McGilchrist writes:

"[Y]ou could say, to sum up a vastly complex matter in a phrase, that the brain's left hemisphere is designed to help us ap-prehend – and thus manipulate – the world; the right hemisphere to com-prehend it – see it all for what it is."

He believes that "nowadays we live no longer in the presence of the world, but rather in a re-presentation of it. The significance of that is that the left hemisphere’s task is to 're-present' what first 'presences' to the right hemisphere."

McGilchrist argues that the Western world has "oscillated" between predominantly left-brain and predominantly right-brain function through history, with some periods of relative balance. During certain periods such as the Renaissance, there was a movement toward the right, whereas since the Scientific Revolution and the Age of Enlightenment – with exceptions such as the Romantic movement – it has become increasingly left-brain dominant, and in light of this, McGilchrist is concerned about the many cultural and global crises that we now face.

=== Volume 1: "The Ways to Truth" ===
In Part I of "The Ways to Truth", McGilchrist looks at the neuroscience and different worldviews of the two hemispheres of the brain, and the means to truth: attention, perception, judgement, apprehension, emotional and social intelligence, cognitive intelligence, and creativity. He also explores the mental disorders schizophrenia and autism.

In Part II, the author looks at the brain hemispheres and the paths to truth, which he sees as being science, reason, intuition, and imagination. He shows the advantages and limitations of each approach, the desirability of using these in combination, and argues that in each of these approaches, the right hemisphere of the brain plays a more important and more veridical role than the left.

=== Volume 2: "What Then is True?" ===
In Part III, "What Then is True?", McGilchrist asks and attempts to answer the question "what is truth?", before turning to a wide-ranging exploration of the nature of reality: the coincidence of opposites (the idea that at a deeper, higher or transcendent level, apparent opposites may be reconciled or find union); the one and the many; time; flow and movement; space and matter; matter and consciousness; value; purpose, life and the nature of the cosmos; and the sense of the sacred. McGilchrist further argues that consciousness, rather than matter, is ontologically fundamental.

== Reception ==
In September 2021, The Matter with Things was included in a feature article titled "Top 10 books about human consciousness," as compiled by Oxford Law professor and philosopher Charles Foster for The Guardian. Foster described it as a "devastating assault" on the predominant materialist worldview, and as “one of the most important books ever published. And, yes, I do mean ever.”

Writer Philip Pullman selected The Matter with Things as his favourite book of the year 2021 for the New Statesman. He describes McGilchrist's earlier work, The Master and His Emissary as a "densely researched" and "entirely thrilling" examination of the hemispheric functioning of the brain. He states that The Matter with Things takes these basic ideas much further, praising its "immense range of learning and beautiful prose", and reflecting that having spent a decade digesting the first work, he looks forward to a life-time's learning with The Matter with Things.

Professor of philosophy Ronan Sharkey, writing in The Tablet in December 2021, describes The Matter with Things as a "book of remarkable inspiration and erudition". He is of the opinion that McGilchrist is "leading a quiet but far-reaching revolution in the understanding of who we are as human beings, one with potentially momentous consequences for many of the preoccupations – from ecology and health care to economics and artificial intelligence – that weigh on our present and darken our future." He writes that McGilchrist provides us with the resources and encouragement to "'reconceive our world, our reality'", to 'learn again to see.'" Though McGilchrist's approach is detailed and rigorous, says the reviewer, it is less of an argument "than a plea for openness to what reality ... can teach us".

In December 2021, Rod Dreher wrote in The American Conservative that though Part I of The Matter with Things is a "fairly technical discussion of neuroscience", the book is "more focused on the philosophical and metaphysical implications" of the hemispheric functioning of the brain proposed in his earlier book, The Master and His Emissary.

Dreher tells us that McGilchrist asks and addresses fundamental questions such as: "Who are we? What is the world? How can we understand consciousness, matter, space and time? Is the cosmos without purpose or value? Can we really neglect the sacred and divine?" and that "In doing so, he argues that we have become enslaved to an account of things dominated by the brain’s left hemisphere, one that blinds us to an awe-inspiring reality that is all around us, had we but eyes to see it." Dreher says: "Following the paths of cutting-edge neurology, philosophy and physics", McGilchrist offers "a vision that returns the world to life, and us to a better way of living in it: one we must embrace if we are to survive."

Writing in the New Statesman in January 2022, Ed Smith tells us that "while anchored in neuroscience, [the work] expands quickly into a treatise on philosophy, the scientific method, intuition, creativity, truth, reason and the rise and fall of civilisation itself."

Smith describes the book as an "immensely broad and ambitious work". He does note that "there is certainly great audacity in McGilchrist's prose style ... But it's hard to see how huge generalisations [such as 'The West is wrong to...'] could have been avoided, partly because the kind of ideas – or supra-rational insights – under review are more often addressed by poets and composers than writers of closely argued non-fiction."

Jonathan Gaisman, writing in The Spectator in February 2022, states that "Western civilisation is in a predicament exemplified by alienation, environmental despoliation, the atrophy of value, the sterility of contemporary art, the increasing prevalence of rectilinear, bureaucratised thinking and the triumph of procedure over substance." Gaisman sees the lesser aim of the book being to identify and understand the common basis of these conditions, and hopefully improve them, whereas he sees the greater aim as being "to enable us to know the world we inhabit."

Gaisman states that "McGilchrist seeks to give an account 'at last, true to experience, to science and to philosophy'." He is of the opinion that "[t]he range and erudition are astounding", and that as a "polymath", McGilchrist "stands upon the shoulders of the giants whose words he amply cites. His forebears include Heraclitus (not Plato), Pascal (definitely not Descartes), Goethe, Wordsworth, Schelling, Hegel, Heidegger, William James, Whitehead and Bergson." He concludes that "there is nothing wacky or tendentious about this book. McGilchrist writes readably and with poetic sensibility. The tone is courteous ... modest and above all wise". He advises that "after reading it you will never see the world in the same way again."

In March 2022, Nick Spencer writes in Prospect magazine that though left brain–right brain discourse in popular psychology has had a "bad press" and been debunked, McGilchrist's work is "altogether more sophisticated." The reviewer notes that McGilchrist has himself pointed out that "just about everything that is said about the hemispheres in pop psychology is wrong because it rests on beliefs about what the hemispheres do, not about how they approach it."

Framing his review around Charles Darwin's work on evolution, Nick Spencer concludes that in his opinion, "[McGilchrist's] claims may turn modern ultra-Darwinists purple, but they cannot easily be dismissed." Noting as McGilchrist did that in his elder years Darwin lamented the way in which his prior, wide-ranging interests had narrowed and his mind had atrophied, due to the rigorous nature of his work, Spencer speculates that had he been alive today, Darwin himself may have been sympathetic to McGilchrist's work.

In a lengthy and detailed review for Beshara Magazine in June 2022, Richard Gault describes McGilchrist as a gifted "renaissance man" – a polymath with an "exceptional range" of knowledge and interests. He is of the opinion that The Matter with Things "adds greatly to our understanding of the world and provides a formidable contemporary argument for a unified vision" that "may help break down resistance to the change that is needed [in the world] while also opening up ways to go forward."

Writing for the Los Angeles Review of Books on 8 January 2023, former Archbishop of Canterbury, Rowan Williams describes McGilchrist's work as "two overwhelmingly detailed and sophisticated volumes". Generally appreciative of the "magisterial argument" that the author presents, he writes that "it is precisely the fatal skewing of perception which misreads the environment we inhabit that sets us out on our self-destructive path." He is, however, more critical of McGilchrist's dealing with the "metaphysical questions", which "are tantalizing just because of the force and coherence of the rest of the work." Williams writes that "It is no disrespect, I hope, to McGilchrist’s genius to say that these sections sometimes feel more careless or scattergun in their effect than the body of the argument," Nevertheless, he concludes: "There can be no denying that this, like McGilchrist’s earlier work, is a genuinely groundbreaking and exceptionally important challenge to what Mary Midgley, in a book very much in tune with this, called 'the myths we live by' in North Atlantic modernity/late modernity/postmodernity. This is the era of 'infotainment,' egregious public lies, corrosive cynicism, scientific fundamentalism, the barbaric functionalizing of education, and the Balkanization of public argument." Finally: "In the long run, I imagine, McGilchrist would say that this is an unforgivingly big book because his subject matter is unforgivingly urgent and complex. And he addresses this with an extraordinary blend of detailed clinical evidence, a keen eye for the illusions of popular culture, a style of exemplary simplicity and energy, and a consistent moral passion."

Writing for First Things magazine, Dan Hitchens described The Matter With Things as a book that "may mark the end of the Age of Darwin and the beginning of a new intellectual era." Whereas the Darwinian account produced a vision of the cosmos as an "unfathomable, pointless expanse, punctuated by rocks and fireballs, nothing to history but 13.7 billion years of chemical reactions, in which humans appear for a blink of an eye and then disappear," McGilchrist presents an alternative story that is sufficiently compelling and well-grounded as to effectively negate the materialist picture of reality.

== Criticism ==
Writing in the Literary Review in April 2022, philosopher and cultural critic Raymond Tallis states that the author "offers wide-ranging, indeed world-ranging, investigations ultimately anchored to the arguments he advanced in his earlier book." However, Tallis is not convinced by the author's thesis, and raises several objections. He is of the opinion that the "digression-rich explorations are welcome oases after the densely referenced neuroscience. They would be more refreshing if they did not always lead back to his twin obsessions with the naughty left hemisphere – that arrogant know-nothing know-all – and the saintly right hemisphere." The reviewer is "sympathetic" to some of the author's views. However, he is not convinced that "if the hegemony of the left hemisphere remains unchallenged, Western civilisation will collapse," and he concludes that "[w]hile The Matter with Things offers some interesting insights into our nature and the world in which we find ourselves, they are devalued by being subordinated to what ironically seems a rather reductionist critique of reductionism."

Theologian Andrew Louth also reviewed The Matter with Things for the Los Angeles Review of Books on 8 January 2023. Louth writes that "McGilchrist's chief argument is that, over the last three and a half centuries, we have developed a worldview that draws almost entirely on the propensities of the LH side of the brain, ignoring for the most part the contribution of the RH side. This means that our apprehension of the world focuses largely on the particular, with a view to controlling and manipulating it. It is driven by a search for certainty, which is achieved by a kind of 'divide and rule' strategy, favoring the fragmentary and all that can be measured and analyzed, while ignoring or deeming 'subjective' all that which cannot be subjected to this regime."

Louth is concerned about the manner of McGilchrist's presentation, writing that "Besides his strictly scientific learning, he is a man of wide and deep reading who supports his case by appeal to philosophers and poets, as well as scientists, especially physicists, reflecting on the implications of their discoveries. I felt, however, that his appeal for their support amounted too often to quotations and too little to real engagement with their thought." He notes, for example in the treatment of Plato, that "the trouble with such overarching accounts is that they cut too many corners and run the risk of misrepresentation," and he also has concerns about McGilchrist's treatment of the section on paradox. Louth concludes that "the case [McGilchrist] is making ... is not unheard of: it coincides with all-too-common laments about modernity, pointing to the reign of quantity, the rise of individualism, the abandonment of tradition — opinions easily dismissed by those who pride themselves on the achievements of modernity. Perhaps it is to these 'cultured despisers' that McGilchrist's case is directed — a [right hemisphere (RH)] case against the hegemony of the [left hemisphere (LH)]." He states that "this book is almost unique in combining extensive scientific expertise with learning characteristic of the humanities, a sensitivity to language, and an appeal to poetry as the ultimate language of truth. McGilchrist sounds like someone who knows of what he speaks. [The] RH, he tells us, is disposed to pessimism, but this book gives grounds for at least a cautious optimism, amounting to 'good thoughts in bad times.'"

== See also ==
- Bicameral mentality: A related theory by Julian Jaynes based in communication between the brain hemispheres
- Disenchantment
- Lateralization of brain function
- Modernism and postmodernism
- Panpsychism
- Philosophy of mind
- Simulacra and Simulation: A book by Jean Baudrillard
- Sociocultural evolution
- Societal collapse
