= Michael Warren Schwartz =

American endocrinologist

Michael Warren Schwartz is Robert H. Williams Endowed Chair, Professor of Medicine in the Division of Metabolism, Endocrinology and Nutrition at the University of Washington and Director of the UW Medicine Diabetes and Obesity Center of Excellence. He is the Director of the NIH-funded Nutrition Obesity Research Center (NORC) at the University of Washington. His research investigates brain mechanisms governing energy balance and glucose metabolism and how obesity and diabetes result from impairment of these brain systems. He has published more than 200 articles and book chapters related to these topics and his research has been continuously funded by the NIH since joining the faculty of UW 18 years ago. Dr. Schwartz is a member of the Association of American Physicians, the Western Association of Physicians, and the American Society for Clinical Investigation, is the recipient of the 2007 Williams-Rachmiel Levine Award for Outstanding Mentorship from the Western Society for Clinical Investigation, the 2006 Naomi Berrie Award for Outstanding Achievement in Diabetes Research from Columbia University, and was the 2012 Solomon A. Berson Lecturer for the American Physiological Society, among other awards. He is a member of the editorial boards of the Journal of Clinical Investigation, American Journal of Physiology, Endocrine Reviews, Molecular Metabolism and Frontiers in Neuroendocrinology.

== Selected publications ==
- Schwartz, MW; Peskind, E; Raskind, M; Nicolson, M; Moore, J; Morawiecki, A; Boyko, EJ; Porte, D. "Jr. Cerebrospinal Fluid leptin levels: Relationship to plasma levels and to adiposity in humans". Nature Medicine. 2 (589–93): 1996.
- Schwartz, MW; Seeley, RJ; Campfield, LA; Burn, P; Baskin, DG (1996). "Identification of targets of leptin action in rat hypothalamus". J Clin Invest. 98: 1101–1106.
- Seeley, RJ; Yagaloff, KA; Fisher, SL; Burn, P; Thiele, TE; van Dijk, G; Baskin, DG; Schwartz, MW (1997). "Melanocortin receptors in leptin effects". Nature. 390: 349.
- Schwartz, MW; Seeley, RJ; Weigle, DS; Woods, SC; Campfield, LA; Burn, P; Baskin, DG (1997). "Leptin increases proopimelanocortin (POMC) mRNA expression in the rostral arcuate nucleus". Diabetes. 46: 2119–2123.
- Hahn, T; Breininger, JF; Baskin, DG; Schwartz, MW. "Coexpression of Agrp and NPY in fasting-activated hypothalamic neurons". Nature Neuroscience. 1 (271–272): 1998.
- Schwartz, MW; Woods, SC; Seeley, RJ; Porte, D (2000). "Jr., and Baskin DG. Central nervous system control of food intake". Nature. 404: 661–671.
- Niswender, KD; Morton, GJ; Stearns, WH; Rhodes, CJ; Myers, MG; Schwartz, MW. "Key enzyme in leptin-induced anorexia". Nature. 413 (794–795): 2001.
- Morton, GJ; Blevins, JE; Williams, DL; Niswender, KD; Gelling, RW; Rhodes, CJ; Baskin, DG; Schwartz, MW (2005). "Leptin action in the forebrain regulates the hindbrain response to satiety signals". J Clin Invest. 115: 703–710.
- Morton, GJ; Gelling, RN; Niswender, KD; Morrison, CD; Rhodes, CJ; Schwartz, MW (2005). "Leptin regulates insulin sensitivity via phosphatidylinositol-3-OH kinase signaling in mediobasal hypothalamic neurons". Cell Metab. 2: 411–420.
- Schwartz, MW; Porte, D (2005). "Jr. Diabetes, obesity, and the brain". Science. 307: 375–379.
- Morton, GJ; Cummings, DE; Baskin, DG; Barsh, GS; Schwartz, MW (2006). "Central nervous system control of food intake and body weight". Nature. 443: 289–295.
- Sarruf, DA; Thaler, JP; Morton, GJ; German, J; Fischer, JD; Ogimoto, K; Schwartz, MW (2010). "Fibroblast growth factor 21 action in the brain increases energy expenditure and insulin sensitivity in obese rats". Diabetes. 59: 1817–24. doi:10.2337/db09-1878. PMC 2889784. PMID 20357365..
- Kaiyala, KJ; Morton, GJ; Leroux, BG; Ogimoto, K; Wisse, B; Schwartz, MW (2010). "Identification of body fat mass as a major determinant of metabolic rate in mice". Diabetes. 59: 1657–66. doi:10.2337/db09-1582. PMC 2889765. PMID 20413511..
- Ellacott, KL; Morton, GJ; Woods, SC; Tso, P; Schwartz, MW (2010). "Assessment of feeding behavior in laboratory mice". Cell Metab. 12: 10–7. doi:10.1016/j.cmet.2010.06.001. PMC 2916675. PMID 20620991..
- Thaler, JP; Yi, CX; Schur, EA; Guyenet, SJ; Hwang, BH; Dietrich, MO; Zhao, X; Sarruf, DA; Izgur, V; Maravilla, KR; Nguyen, HT; Fischer, JD; Matsen, ME; Wisse, BE; Morton, GJ; Horvath, TL; Baskin, DG; Tschöp, MH; Schwartz, MW (2012). "Obesity is associated with hypothalamic injury in rodents and humans". J Clin Invest. 122: 153–62. doi:10.1172/JCI59660. PMC 3248304. PMID 22201683..
