= Christian Perring =

American philosopher (born 1962)

- Born: 1962 (age 63–64)
- Awards: National Endowment for the Humanities Fellowship

Education
- Education: Princeton University (Ph.D.); King's College London (M.Sc.); Wadham College, Oxford (B.A.)
- Thesis: The limits of irrationality (1996)
- Doctoral advisor: Mark Johnston

Philosophical work
- Era: 21st-century philosophy
- Region: Western philosophy
- Institutions: Georgetown University, University of Kentucky, Dowling College, St. John's University
- Main interests: philosophy of psychiatry philosophy of psychology moral psychology
- Website: http://christianperring.com/

Christian David Perring (born 1962) is an American philosopher. He is known for his works on moral psychology. Perring is the editor of Metapsychology Online Reviews and Vice President of the Association for the Advancement of Philosophy and Psychiatry.

== Career ==
Perring has taught at Georgetown University, the University of Kentucky, Dowling College, and St. John's University. He is a certified APPA counselor.

== Books ==
- Diagnostic Dilemmas in Child and Adolescent Psychiatry: Philosophical Perspectives, edited by Christian Perring and Lloyd Wells, Oxford University Press, 2014, ISBN 9780199645756
