= Michael A. Schwartz =

American academic and psychiatrist

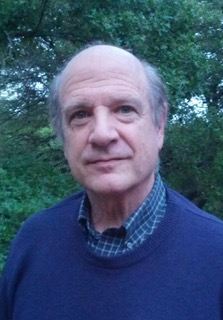
- Education: M.D.
- Alma mater: Cornell University Medical College

Michael Alan Schwartz is an American academic and psychiatrist based in Weston, Connecticut. In 2018, Schwartz retired as clinical professor of psychiatry and joint professor of humanities in medicine at the Texas A&M School of Medicine. He continues practicing psychiatry as well as writing and editing psychiatric books and articles. His work focuses on advancing pluralistic, person and people-centered approaches to psychiatric assessment, care and treatment.

Schwartz is one of the founding editors-in-chief of Philosophy, Ethics and Humanities in Medicine, Associate Editor of Philosophy, Psychiatry, & Psychology, and a member of the Comité de Lecture of PSN (Psychiatrie, Sciences humaines, Neurosciences). He is a Distinguished Life Fellow of the American Psychiatric Association.

== Education ==
Schwartz received his A.B. from Princeton University and his M.D. from Cornell University Medical College. Subsequently, he joined Cornell University’s hospital as an intern and continued working there until 1974. From 1972 to 1974, he also worked as a clinical associate at the Laboratory of Neuropsychiatry at the National Institute of Mental Health.

== Career ==
In 1974, Schwartz joined the Cornell University Medical College as an assistant professor of psychiatry. Simultaneously, he started working as an inpatient unit chief at the New York Hospital - Westchester Division. In 1979, he joined the New York Medical College as an associate professor of clinical psychiatry and taught there until 1992 when he left to join Case Western Reserve University School of Medicine. While teaching at Case Western, he also served as professor and vice chair of education in psychiatry from 1992 to 1996 and as professor of psychiatry from 1996-2000.

Schwartz became clinical professor of psychiatry at Case Western in 2000. In 2005, he left Case Western and joined the University of Hawaiʻi at Mānoa as clinical professor of psychiatry. After leaving University of Hawaii in 2012, Schwartz joined the Texas A&M Health Science Center College of Medicine and served, until 2018, as clinical professor of psychiatry and joint professor of humanities in medicine. While at Texas A&M, he has served as regional chair (Round Rock) for the Texas A&M College of Medicine’s Departments of Psychiatry (2012) and of Humanities in Medicine (2012–2017). He is presently an adjunct professor at the Texas A&M College of Medicine.

In 1991, Schwartz served as founding president of the Association for the Advancement of Philosophy and Psychiatry (AAPP). He served as president of AAPP from 1991-1994 and was on the executive council of AAPP from 1989-2013.

Since 2013, Schwartz has served on the executive council of the Karl Jaspers Society of North America, and since 2019 on the National Advisory Council of the Hogg Foundation for Mental Health.

=== Work ===
Schwartz's work, anchored in phenomenology, has focused on advancing pluralistic, person and people-centered approaches to psychiatric assessment, care and treatment. His work emphasizes that any single theory used to understand and treat the person will only permit a one-sided and limited perspective on that patient’s situation - pointing the psychiatrist toward some facts about the patient but at the same time blinding the psychiatrist to others. In order to gain a fuller understanding, the psychiatrist must draw on other perspectives, also one-sided and limited. Hence, in the end, every perspective both reveals and conceals aspects of the patient’s condition.

== Awards and honors ==
- 1974 - Fellow, American Academy of Forensic Sciences
- 1977 - Fellow, New York Academy of Medicine
- 1982 - Distinguished fellow, American Psychiatric Association
- 1996 - Honorary Member, Societè Italiana per la Psicopatologia
- 1996 - Exemplary Paper in Humility Theology Award from John Templeton Foundation
- 1998 - Dr. Margrit Egnér-Stiftung Prize, University of Zurich, Switzerland. Shared with Osborne Wiggins
- 2000 - Exemplary Psychiatrist Award from NAMI (National Alliance for the Mentally Ill)
- 2005 - Distinguished Life Fellow, American Psychiatric Association

== Selected publications ==
=== Books ===
- Phenomenology, Language, and Schizophrenia. Spitzer M (Ed), Uehlein F (Ed), Schwartz MA (Ed), Mundt C (Ed) (1992)
- Philosophical Perspectives on Psychiatric Diagnostic Classification. Sadler JZ (Ed), Wiggins OP (Ed), Schwartz, MA (Ed) (1994)
- Norepinephrine in Brain: Neurobiology and Therapeutics for the 21st Century. Ordway GA (Ed), Schwartz MA (Ed), Frazer A (Ed) (2007)
- Phenomenological Neuropsychiatry: How Patient Experience Bridges the Clinic with Clinical Neuroscience Mishara AL (Ed), Moskalewicz M (Ed), Schwartz MA (Editor), Kranjec A (Ed) (2024)

=== Articles ===
- Gillin JC, Cannon HE, Magyar R, Schwartz MA, and Wyatt RJ: Failure of N,N,-Dimethyltryptamine to evoke tolerance in cats. Biological Psychiatry 7:213-219, 1973.
- Schwartz MA, Wiggins O: Science, humanism and the nature of medical practice: a phenomenological view. Perspectives in Biology and Medicine 28:331-361, 1985 (Reprinted in Odegaard CE: Dear Doctor: A Personal Letter to a Physician The Henry J. Kaiser Family Foundation, Menlo Park, California, pages 117-156, 1987).
- Schwartz MA, and Wiggins OP: Systems and the structuring of meaning: contributions to a biopsychosocial medicine. American Journal of Psychiatry 143:1213-1221, 1986.
- Schwartz MA, and Wiggins OP: Typifications: The first step for clinical diagnosis in psychiatry. The Journal of Nervous and Mental Disease 175:65-77, 1987.
- Schwartz MA, and Wiggins OP: Perspectivism and the methods of psychiatry. Comprehensive Psychiatry 29:237-251, 1988.
- Wiggins OP, and Schwartz MA: Is there a science of meaning? Integrative Psychiatry 7:48-53, 1991.
- Schwartz MA: Neurophilosophy, psychopathology and clinical psychiatric science, Journal of Nervous and Mental Disease, 179:317-319, 1991.
- Schwartz MA, Wiggins OP: Phenomenology and psychiatry. In L Embree (Ed) Encycl of Phenomenology, Kluwer Academic Publishers, Dordrecht, Holland, 1997, pp. 562–568.
- Schwartz MA, Wiggins OP, Spitzer M: Psychotic experience and disordered thinking: A reappraisal from new perspectives. The Journal of Nervous and Mental Disease, 185:176-187, 1997.
- Mishara AL, Schwartz, MA: Psychopathology in the light of emerging trends in the philosophy of consciousness, neuropsychiatry and phenomenology. Current Opinion in Psychiatry pages 383-389. 1997.
- Schwartz, MA, Wiggins OP: Psychosomatic medicine and the philosophy of life. Philosophy, Ethics, and Humanities in Medicine 2010 5: (January 21, 2010).
- Schwartz MA, Moskalewicz M, Wiggins OP: Karl Jaspers: The Icon of Modern Psychiatry. Israel Journal of Psychiatry and Related Sciences 54(2), pages 4–9, 2017.
- Moskalewicz M, Schwartz MA: Temporal Experience in Mania. Phenomenology and the Cognitive Sciences 2018.
- Moskalewicz M, Schwartz MA, Wiggins OP: The Gift of Mental Illness: The Rise and Fall of Cultures from a Psychiatric Perspective. Eidos 2(4), 2018
- Moskalewicz M, Schwartz MA, Gozè T: Phenomenology of Intuitive Judgment. Praecox Feeling in the Diagnosis of Schizophrenia. AVANT, Volume IX, Number 2/2018
- Moskalewicz M, Kordel1 P, Brejwo A, Schwartz MA, Gozé T: Psychiatrists Report Praecox Feeling and Find It Reliable. A Cross-Cultural Comparison. Frontiers in Psychiatry, March 5, 2021
- Schlimme JA, and Schwartz MA: Highlighting individuality: Reduction of psychopharmaca requires individual prescriptions during individual recovery. In Peter Lehmann & Craig Newnes (Eds) Withdrawal from Prescribed Psychotropic Drugs. Peter Lehmann Publishing, Berlin & Lancaster, 2021, pages 229–241.
