= Michael Schwarz =

Michael Schwarz may refer to:

- Michael A. Schwarz, economist
- Michael Viktor Schwarz, German art historian
- Michael Schwarz (drummer) in Atrocity (band)
- Michael Schwarz (filmmaker) on Muhammad: Legacy of a Prophet
- Michael Schwarz (professor), Israeli university professor and recipient of a 2011 Israel Prize
- Michael Schwarz, political candidate for High Peak (UK Parliament constituency)
- Lance Corporal Michael A. Schwarz, see List of acts of the 111th United States Congress

== See also ==
- Michael Schwartz (disambiguation)
