= Association for the Advancement of Philosophy and Psychiatry =

- Founder: Michael A. Schwartz
- Established: 1989
- Mission: to promote research in philosophy and psychiatry
- President: Christian Perring
- Key people: Robyn Bluhm, Miriam Solomon, Brent Kious, Aaron Kostco
- Website: https://aapp.press.jhu.edu/

The Association for the Advancement of Philosophy and Psychiatry, or AAPP, is an organization of psychiatrists and philosophers who share an interest in the interface of their two fields. It publishes a quarterly journal and holds annual meetings in conjunction with the annual meeting of the American Psychiatric Association.

== Purpose ==
The AAPP is a learned society of psychiatrists and philosophers who share an interest in the interface of philosophy and psychiatry. It was formed to facilitate the integration of these two fields by promoting cross-disciplinary research, educational initiatives, and graduate training programs.

The organization believes that philosophical methods applied to psychiatry bring types of analysis and critique that are valuable for their clarity of thought, meaning, and application to clinical practice. It also believes that psychiatry informs philosophy, and that "philosophy and psychiatry" is developing into an interdisciplinary field of its own. AAPP aims to enhance the psychiatrist's effectiveness as teacher, researcher, and practitioner by shedding light on the philosophical issues embedded in these activities. It also aims to study the ways in which psychiatric knowledge, theories, and practices can add to basic philosophical assumptions about subjects like mind, knowledge, and subjectivity. Specific interest areas of AAPP include the identification and understanding of abnormal experience and behavior; the problem of classifying psychiatric conditions; the relationship between neuroscience and clinical practice; the evaluation of clinical methods; and moral and ethical issues raised by psychiatric categories and practice.

== Publications ==
The organization's official journal is Philosophy, Psychiatry, & Psychology, published quarterly by Johns Hopkins University Press. The AAPP Bulletin is an informal publication released on an irregular schedule, typically one or two times a year.

AAPP, in collaboration with two related organizations, sponsors Psagacity, a privately owned website featuring professionally produced oral history videos of prominent members.

== Meetings ==
AAPP holds it annual meeting as an Affiliated Group on the opening weekend of the annual meeting of the American Psychiatric Association.

== Related organizations ==
AAPP is closely associated with other organizations in the field, including the UK-based International Network for Philosophy & Psychiatry and the Philosophy Interest Group of the Royal College of Psychiatrists. The Department of Psychiatry at the University of Montreal and the Centre Hospitalier de l’Université de Montreal are sponsoring institutions of AAPP and its journal.
