= The Roots of the Self =

1995 book by Robert Ornstein

The Roots of the Self: Unraveling the Mystery of Who We Are
- Author: Robert Ornstein
- Language: English
- Subject: Human development
- Genre: Non-fiction
- Publication date: 1995
- ISBN: 978-0-062-50789-1

The Roots of the Self: Unraveling the Mystery of Who We Are is a 1995 book about human development by Robert Ornstein (author of The Evolution Of Consciousness). It explores the trajectory of genetics, creativity, and higher consciousness from the womb to the grave.
