= American Association of Professional Ringside Physicians =

The American Association of Professional Ringside Physicians (AAPRP) is an organization of physicians that work in the boxing and mixed martial arts (MMA) industries. The organization includes physicians from around the globe (about 350 in 2005).

== History ==
The AAPRP was established to promote safety in ringside medicine. Up until 1997, no organization existed solely devoted to the medical aspects of ringside medicine. An event in 1997, however, convinced members of the Association of Boxing Commissions (ABC) that an organization was needed to specifically work on improving the use of ringside medicine. Prior to the Roy Jones Jr. v. Montell Griffin world championship fight, the fight was in danger of being canceled due to missing medical documentation. In a last minute effort to save the fight, the Foxwoods Commission and Medical Advisory Board urgently requested that the medical reports be sent from physicians in New York, Nevada and Australia and the fight took place as planned.

In order to prevent similar threats of cancellations at future world championship contests, John R. Burns Jr. (former Connecticut State Boxing Commissioner) met with Dr. Michael Schwartz (Chief Ringside Physician for the State of Connecticut). Their discussion resulted in a recommendation to the ABC that the AAPRP be created. Since its creation, the AAPRP has helped create medical guidelines, standardization and research into boxing injuries as well as efforts to promote education via yearly seminars.

To better serve professional, as well as amateur boxers, MMA contestants and other combat sport participants and to more inclusively represent global combat sports medicine, a formal and long-contemplated name change occurred in 2011. The American Association of Professional Ringside Physicians (AAPRP) evolved into the Association of Ringside Physicians (ARP). Additionally, the organization became affiliated with the American College of Sports Medicine.

== Activities ==
As of 2009, the AAPRP has held eight national conventions. Each medical meeting has included many topics devoted to ringside issues. Prominent speakers have included Sugar Ray Leonard, Ken Norton, Gerry Cooney, Teddy Atlas, Floyd Mayweather Jr., Bernard Hopkins, Emanuel Steward, Lou DiBella, Bert Sugar, Chris Byrd, Mia St. John, and Ferdie Pacheco. The AAPRP has published numerous booklets and manuals on safety issues and has created the first certification program in ringside medicine. The AAPRP has established minimum medical requirements for pre-fight clearance and has met with Senator John McCain and Congressman Peter T. King in order to help create a national boxing commission. The AAPRP is in the process of creating the first national medical data bank for fighters' medical information and is actively supporting research projects by many of its members.

In 2005, the AAPRP worked as the medical advisors for the NBC television production of The Contender.
