= Anthony David (neuropsychiatrist) =

British neuropsychiatrist

Anthony David FMedSci
- Education: University of Glasgow
- Scientific career
- Fields: Psychiatry
- Workplaces: King's College London
- Website: King's College London

Anthony David is a British neuropsychiatrist based at University College London. Previously tenured as professor of cognitive neuropsychiatry and Vice Dean at the Institute of Psychiatry, King's College London, since 2018 he has been Director, University College London, Institute of Mental Health. He is the father of Rebecca David, a Senior Campaign Manager at Influencer LTD, and Michael David, a junior doctor.

== Education ==
Professor David studied medicine at the University of Glasgow, from which he graduated in 1980. Subsequently he had trained in neurology, then psychiatry.

== Career ==
He has been an honorary consultant at the Maudsley Hospital, London, since 1990, and was awarded a personal chair from the Institute of Psychiatry, King's College London, in 1996.

He has a wide range of professional and research interests and has published on schizophrenia, neuropsychiatry, medically unexplained syndromes and neuroimaging – both structural and functional – and specialises in research into insight (awareness of illness) in schizophrenia and other disorders.

Professor David is a Fellow of the Royal College of Physicians, the Royal College of Psychiatrists and the Academy of Medical Sciences. He is a member of the Experimental Psychology Society and a founder member of both the British Neuropsychological Society and British Neuropsychiatry Association; he is currently Chairman of the latter. He is also an Emeritus Senior Investigator at the National Institute for Health and Care Research (NIHR).

He is co-editor of the journal Cognitive Neuropsychiatry, and has published several academic books and one for the general reader published in February 2020, 'Into the Abyss: a neuropsychiatrist's tales of troubled minds' (Published by Oneworld).

== Bibliography ==
- David, Anthony S.; Cutting, John C., eds. (1994). The neuropsychology of schizophrenia. Brain, Behaviour and Cognition Series. Hove, UK Hillsdale, USA: Lawrence Erlbaum Associates, Inc. ISBN 9780863773037.
- David, Anthony S.; Ron, Maria A. (1999). Disorders of brain and mind: volume 1. Cambridge: Cambridge University Press. ISBN 9780521778510.
- David, Anthony S.; Kircher, Tilo (2003). The self in neuroscience and psychiatry. Cambridge: Cambridge University Press. ISBN 9780511205118.
- David, Anthony S.; Amador, Xavier Francisco (2004). Insight and psychosis: awareness of illness in schizophrenia and related disorders (2nd ed.). Oxford: Oxford University Press. ISBN 9781417599912.
- David AS, Fleminger S, Kopelman M, Lovestone S, Mellers J (Eds). Lishman’s Organic Psychiatry: A Textbook of Neuropsychiatry (Revised 4th Ed). Wiley-Blackwell. 2009.
- David, Anthony S. (2020). Into the Abyss: a neuropsychiatrist's tales of troubled minds. Oneworld Publications. ISBN 978-1786077059.
