= Randy Seeley =

American medical academic

- Born: Randy J. Seeley
- Occupation: Medical academic

Academic background
- Education: Grinnell College; University of Pennsylvania

Randy J. Seeley is an American medical academic.

He graduated from Grinnell College in 1989 with a degree in psychology, and earned a master's and doctoral degree in the subject from University of Pennsylvania in 1990 and 1993, respectively. Seeley completed a postdoctoral fellowship at the University of Washington in 1995, and taught there until 1997, when he moved to the University of Cincinnati, where he was named the first Donald C. Harrison Endowed Chair in Medicine in 2008. In 2014, he joined the University of Michigan faculty, and was appointed Henry King Ransom Endowed Professor of Surgery.
