= Mike Schwartz (ice hockey) =

Biographical details
- Born: Minneapolis, Minnesota, U.S.
- Education: University of Wisconsin–River Falls; Augsburg College

Playing career
- 1981–1983: Augsburg

Coaching career (HC unless noted)
- 1986–1990: Johnson HS
- 1990–1991: Sioux City Musketeers
- 1991–1992: San Jose Sharks (scout)
- 1992–1996: White Bear Lake HS
- 1996–2006: Augsburg

Head coaching record
- Overall: 124–110–30 (.527) [college]
- Tournaments: 2–2–0 (.500)

Accomplishments and honors

Championships
- 1998 MIAC champion 1998 MIAC tournament champion

Awards
- 1998 Edward Jeremiah Award

Michael Schwartz is an American former ice hockey player and coach who was the NCAA Division III coach of the year.

== Career ==
Schwartz began attending college at the University of Wisconsin–River Falls right after graduating from Johnson High School in 1975. After two years, however, he left school. In 1979 he returned to the college ranks, this time at Augsburg College. After settling in, he began to play hockey again and was part of the Auggies 1982 Championship team.

Schwartz graduated with a BA in education in 1983 and embarked on a professional career. In 1986 he returned to ice hockey once more as the head coach for his alma mater, Johnson High School. He helped the team win back-to-back twin cities championships in '89 and '90 and was hired by the Sioux City Musketeers as head coach. Schwartz did not see much success in the USHL and was fired after just one season with the Musketeers finishing last in the league. After working as an NHL scout for a year, Schwartz was back behind the bench, this time for White Bear Lake High School. His second turn in high school just as good as the first and he led the White Bears to three consecutive state tournament appearances.

In 1996, Ed Saugestad retired from coaching after 38 years with Augsburg. Schwartz was chosen as his successor and he got off to a good start with a winning season in his first year. For an encore, He led Augsburg to its first conference title in 16 years and the program's first every MIAC Tournament championship (the tournament began in 1986). Despite the NCAA not using automatic qualifiers at the time, the Auggies were also able to make their second NCAA Tournament appearance (the first in 14 years). Augsburg finished 4th in the tournament after taking down Wisconsin–River Falls in the quarterfinals and Schwartz was named as the Division III coach of the year.

The team declined sharply the following year, but Schwartz was able to rebuild the Auggies into a contender in the MIAC. After 2003, however, the program sank out of the playoff picture. In spite of the diminishing returns on the ice, Schwartz was named as the school's director of athletic facilities and helped with major extensions and renovations to several structures on campus, including the Si Melby Hall and Edor Nelson Field. He remained as the facilities director even after resigning as head coach in 2006. Two years later, however, Schwartz left Augsburg to pursue a career in the financial sector.

Schwartz was inducted into the Minnesota Hockey Coaches Association Hall of Fame in 2019.

== Statistics ==
=== Regular season and playoffs ===
			Regular Season					Playoffs
Season	Team	League	GP	G	A	Pts	PIM	GP	G	A	Pts	PIM
1981–82	Augsburg	MIAC	—	—	—	—	—	—	—	—	—	—
1982–83	Augsburg	MIAC	—	—	—	—	—	—	—	—	—	—
NCAA totals			—	—	—	—	—	—	—	—	—	—

== Head coaching record ==
=== USHL ===
Team	Year	Regular season						Postseason
Team	Year	G	W	L	T	Pts	Finish	Result
Sioux City Musketeers	1990–91	46	9	38	1	(20)	10th	N/A
Totals		46	9	38	1	—	—	—

=== College ===
Record table
Season	Team	Overall	Conference	Standing	Postseason
Augsburg Auggies (MIAC) (1996–2006)
1996–97	Augsburg	14–10–1	9–7–0	5th	
1997–98	Augsburg	21–8–4	12–3–1	T–1st	NCAA third place game (loss)
1998–99	Augsburg	11–12–4	8–5–3	T–4th	MIAC Semifinals
1999–00	Augsburg	10–13–4	8–5–3	3rd	MIAC Semifinals
2000–01	Augsburg	12–11–2	9–6–1	T–4th	
2001–02	Augsburg	14–9–3	10–5–1	3rd	MIAC Semifinals
2002–03	Augsburg	17–9–0	10–6–0	3rd	MIAC Semifinals
2003–04	Augsburg	8–13–4	5–8–3	6th	
2004–05	Augsburg	8–12–5	5–8–3	T–6th	
2005–06	Augsburg	9–13–3	5–8–3	7th	
Augsburg:		124–110–30	81–61–18		
Total:		124–110–30			
National champion Postseason invitational champion Conference regular season champion Conference regular season and conference tournament champion Division regular season champion Division regular season and conference tournament champion Conference tournament champion

Awards and achievements
Preceded by Mike McShane	Edward Jeremiah Award; 1997–98	Succeeded by Mike McShane
