= The Master and His Emissary =

2009 book by Iain McGilchrist

- Front cover of The Master and His Emissary
- Author: Iain McGilchrist
- Language: English
- Genre: Psychology, neuroscience, philosophy of mind, sociocultural evolution
- Publisher: Yale University Press
- Publication date: 30 October 2009
- Publication place: United States and United Kingdom
- Media type: Print (Hardback)
- Pages: 608 pp.
- ISBN: 0-300-14878-X (hardback edition)
- Followed by: The Matter with Things

The Master and His Emissary: The Divided Brain and the Making of the Western World is a 2009 book written by the British psychiatrist Iain McGilchrist that deals with the specialist hemispheric functioning of the brain. The differing world views of the right and left brain (the "Master" and "Emissary" in the title, respectively) have, according to the author, shaped Western culture since the time of the ancient Greek philosopher Plato, and the growing conflict between these views has implications for the way the modern world is changing.

The Master and His Emissary received mixed reviews upon its publication. Some critics praised the book as being a landmark publication that could alter readers' perspective of how they viewed the world; other critics claimed neurological understanding of hemispheric differences falls short of supporting the sweeping conclusions the book draws about Western culture.

The Master and His Emissary was shortlisted for the 2010 Bristol Festival of Ideas Book Prize, and was longlisted for the Royal Society 2010 Prize for Science Books.

== Background and influences ==
In an interview with Frontier Psychiatrist, McGilchrist cites two main influences on his work: the psychiatrist John Cutting and the psychologist David McNeill. McGilchrist states: "What I began to see – and it was John Cutting's work on the right hemisphere that set me thinking – was that the difference lay not in what they [the two hemispheres] do, but how they do it." In the same interview, the author explains: "Some very subtle research by David McNeill, amongst others, confirms that thought originates in the right hemisphere, is processed for expression in speech by the left hemisphere, and the meaning integrated again by the right (which alone understands the overall meaning of a complex utterance, taking everything into account)."

== Synopsis ==
The 608-page book is about the specialist hemispheric functioning of the brain. The differing world views of the right and left brain (the "Master" and "Emissary" in the title, respectively) have, according to the author, shaped Western culture since the time of the ancient Greek philosopher Plato, and the growing conflict between these views has implications for the way the modern world is changing.

The book is divided into an introduction, two parts and a conclusion. In the introduction, McGilchrist states that "there is, literally, a world of difference between the [brain] hemispheres. Understanding quite what that is has involved a journey through many apparently unrelated areas: not just neurology and psychology, but philosophy, literature and the arts, and even, to some extent, archaeology and anthropology."

=== Part One: The Divided Brain ===
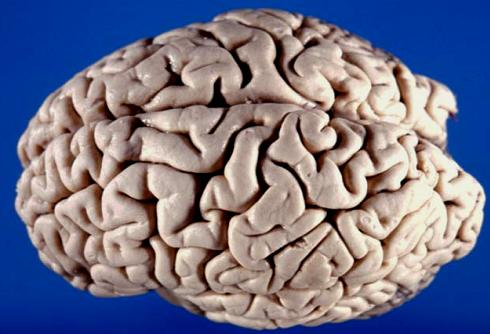
Superior-lateral view of the brain, showing left and right hemispheres.

In "The Divided Brain", McGilchrist digests study after study, replacing the popular and superficial notion of the hemispheres as respectively logical and creative in nature with the idea that they pay attention in fundamentally different ways, the left being detail-oriented, the right being whole-oriented. These two modes of perception cascade into wildly different hemispheric personalities, and in fact reflect yet a further asymmetry in their status, that of the right's more immediate relationship with physical bodies (our own as well as others) and external reality as represented by the senses, a relationship that makes it the mediator, the first and last stop, of all experience.

=== Part Two: How the Brain Has Shaped Our World ===
In the second part, "How the Brain Has Shaped Our World", the author describes the evolution of Western culture, as influenced by hemispheric brain functioning, from the ancient world, through the Renaissance and Reformation; the Enlightenment; Romanticism and Industrial Revolution; to the modern and postmodern worlds which, to our detriment, are becoming increasingly dominated by the left brain.

== Reception ==
The book received mixed reviews in various newspapers and journals. Reviewing The Master and His Emissary in the American Journal of Psychiatry, Jacob Freedman wrote the book “valiantly addresses the effect hemispheric asymmetry has had on Western civilization" and that it chronicled "how the left brain's determined reductionism and the right brain's insightful and holistic approach have shaped music, language, politics, and art." A review by Bryan Appleyard in Times Online described the book as suggesting "we are thinking more and more like machines, and risk losing what makes us human", while David Cox in the Evening Standard wrote that the author "shows convincingly that the degeneracy of the West springs from our failure to manage the binary division of our brains."

In a positive review in The Guardian, the philosopher Mary Midgley wrote that the book "points out the complexity, the divided nature of thought itself and asks about its connection with the structure of the brain," and that "though neurologists may well not welcome it because it asks them new questions, the rest of us will surely find it splendidly thought-provoking." In another positive review in Standpoint magazine, the neurologist Adam Zeman wrote that McGilchrist "extends [the] received wisdom with a hugely ambitious, absorbing and questionable thesis: the two hemispheres have radically contrasting personalities; that they live in a state of creative tension, sometimes declining into open war; and that their struggle for supremacy provides the key to understanding the major cultural movements of human history. In the Times Literary Supplement, W. F. Bynum wrote: "McGilchrist's careful analysis of how brains work is a veritable tour de force, gradually and skilfully revealed. I know of no better exposition of the current state of functional brain neuroscience."

In a mixed review in Literary Review, the philosopher A. C. Grayling wrote that the book was "beautifully written, erudite, fascinating and adventurous," but added that "the findings of brain science are nowhere near fine-grained enough yet to support the large psychological and cultural conclusions Iain McGilchrist draws." A negative review in The Economist stated that the book resorted to "generalisations of breathtaking sweep" and that the second part of the book "has plainly become untethered from its moorings in brain science." Likewise, the psychologist Michael Corballis said of the work, that "Although widely acclaimed, this book goes far beyond the neurological facts."

Owen Flanagan alleged many shortcomings of the book and delivered a dismissive statement: "The fact is, hemispheric differences are not well understood. Neither are patterns over 2,500 years of western history. Trying to explain the ill-understood latter with a caricature of the former does little to illuminate either." McGilchrist wrote scathingly of this review, saying: "But anyone who has read my book and reads that review will realise what a shameful piece of writing it is," picking on what he alleges to be evidence of superficiality and misrepresentation.

The book has inspired a documentary, The Divided Brain, authorised by McGilchrist.

== Editions ==
- McGilchrist, Iain (2009). The Master and His Emissary. Yale University Press. ISBN 978-0-300-14878-7.

== See also ==
- Lateralization of brain function
- Modernism
- Philosophy of mind
- Sociocultural evolution
- Bicameral mentality: A related theory by Julian Jaynes based in communication between the brain hemispheres
- The Matter with Things: A follow-on book by Iain McGilchrist (2021)
