= My Stroke of Insight =

2008 autobiography by Jill Bolte Taylor

My Stroke of Insight: A Brain Scientist's Personal Journey
- Author: Jill Bolte Taylor
- Language: English
- Publisher: Viking
- Publication date: May 12, 2008
- Publication place: United States
- Media type: Print (Hardback)
- Pages: 192
- ISBN: 0670020745

My Stroke of Insight: A Brain Scientistʼs Personal Journey (2008) is a New York Times bestselling and award-winning book written by Dr. Jill Bolte Taylor, a Harvard-trained neuroanatomist. In it, she tells of her experience in 1996 of having a stroke in her left hemisphere and how the human brain creates our perception of reality and includes tips about how Dr. Taylor rebuilt her own brain from the inside out. It is available in 29 languages.

== Critical reception ==
Desmond O'Neill, M.D. writes in the New England Journal of Medicine that although the account is gripping and insightful, it is "burdened by an interpretation of stroke through the narrow lens of hemispheric function." He also argues that the advice Taylor gives to stroke patients might not be valuable for all stroke patients.

Bert Keizer, a Dutch geriatrician, reviewed the book and described it as "neurosophy", where the author sees brain neurons as the foundation for religious experience.

== Publication, editions and bestseller status ==
The book was initially released in October 2006 as a paperback by Dr. Taylor through the self-publishing company Lulu. It was then sold to Clare Ferraro at Viking, an imprint of Penguin Random House, in a dramatic auction conducted by Dr. Taylor's transmedia agent and attorney Ellen Stiefler and published in hardcover by Viking on May 12, 2008 (ISBN 0670020745).

The hardcover edition debuted near the top of the New York Times Non-fiction Hardcover Bestseller list. My Stroke of Insight spent sixty-three weeks on the New York Times Bestseller Lists, reaching number 4.

The paperback edition was released May 26, 2009, by Plume (ISBN 0452295548) My Stroke of Insight is also available in electronic e-book, large print and audio book forms.

== Ballet ==
Cedar Lake Ballet Company made a ballet about My Stroke of Insight called Orbo Novo. The piece's title is drawn from a 1493 reference to North America by Spanish historian Pietro Martire d'Anghiera. But the "new world" that Cherkaoui is exploring is current theories about the brain, and the text that the 17 dancers speak during the first moments of the 75-minute work comes from My Stroke of Insight, neuroanatomist Jill Bolte Taylor's uncanny recollection of her stroke. The choreography is based on the ramifications of a single resonant idea: the duality between rationality (the left brain) and instinctive, sensual responses (the right brain); between control and the lack of it; between balance and instability, solitude and society. "Thus were the dancers speaking Taylor's words (“My spirit soared free like a great whale gliding through the sea of silent euphoria”), while they physically embodied brain waves and misfiring synapses, with a nod, perhaps, to the double helix: rubbery splayed limbs; über-arched backs; ever-rippling torsos." “‘Orbo Novo’ is a humorous and insightful take on (Taylor's) story,” said dancer Jubal Battisti. “It has a lot to do with the hemispheres of the brain switching between left and right and what that reveals.”
