= Marianne Legato =

American physician, author and lecturer (born 1935)

Marianne J. Legato
- Born: 1935 (age 90–91); New York City, U.S.
- Education: MD, New York University College of Medicine
- Occupation: Physician

Marianne J. Legato is an American physician and researcher known for her contributions to gender-specific medicine. Her work examines how biological sex and gender influence human health and disease patterns, including studies on the relationship between women and cardiovascular disease.

== Early life and education ==
Legato was born in 1935 in New York City. Her father, a general practitioner, influenced her interest in medicine. She initially enrolled at the New York University College of Medicine but left when her father discontinued financial support. Mentored by Drs. M. Irené Ferrer and José María Ferrer, she later returned to complete her medical education.

== Professional career ==
After graduating in 1962, Legato completed an internship and junior residency at Bellevue Hospital in New York, followed by a senior residency at the Presbyterian Hospital of the City of New York. From 1965 to 1968, she was a visiting fellow in cardiology at the Columbia University College of Physicians and Surgeons, and in 1968, Legato became an instructor in medicine, beginning her academic career at the college. She is a professor emerita of Clinical Medicine at Columbia, a Fellow of the American College of Physicians, and a Diplomate of the American Board of Internal Medicine.

She received an award from the American Heart Association for her 1992 book The Female Heart: The Truth About Women and Coronary Artery Disease.

In 1997, Legato established the Partnership for Gender-Specific Medicine at Columbia University College of Physicians and Surgeons, an initiative to promote research into sex-specific differences in human biology. In 1998, she established The Foundation for Gender Specific Medicine, as a continuation of her work with the Partnership.

Legato was president of the First International Congress on Gender-Specific Medicine in Berlin in 2006 and of subsequent International Congresses held in Vienna (2007) and Stockholm (2008).

== Awards ==
Legato received the Martha Lyon Slater Fellowship from 1965 to 1968 and the J. Murray Steele Award in 1971, both given by the New York Heart Association.

Her cardiovascular research was supported by a Research Career Development Award from the National Institutes of Health (NIH) and by research grants from major heart-related organizations, including the American Heart Association.

She has worked on study sections for NIH grant applications at the National Heart, Lung, and Blood Institute.

From 1995 to 1998, Legato served as a member of the advisory board of the Office of Research in Women's Health at the NIH. During that time, she co-chaired a task force responsible for setting research priorities in women's health.

In 2004, Legato was among 300 American physicians featured in the National Library of Medicine's documentary Changing the Face of Medicine. She received the National Council on Women's Health Award for gender-specific medicine in 2005. Ladies' Home Journal established the annual Marianne J. Legato Award in Gender-Specific Medicine in 2006.

=== Publishing awards ===
In 2018, she received a PROSE Award from the Association of American Publishers for her book on clinical medicine, Principles of Gender-Specific Medicine: Gender in the Genomic Era (Third Edition). Her book The Plasticity of Sex: The Molecular Biology and Clinical Features of Genomic Sex, Gender Identity, and Sexual Behavior also received a PROSE Award in the biomedicine category in 2021.

== Personal life ==
Legato has two children, Christiana and Justin.

== Publications ==
Legato's work has been published traditionally and by academic publishers.

=== Books ===
- The Female Heart: The Truth About Women and Heart Disease (with Carol Colman) (1992)
- What Women Need to Know (1997)
- Eve's Rib: The Groundbreaking Guide to Women's Health (2002)
- Why Men Never Remember and Women Never Forget (2005)
- Why Men Die First: How to Lengthen Your Lifespan (2008)

=== Textbooks ===
Principles of Gender-Specific Medicine
