= Dialogues in Clinical Neuroscience =

- Discipline: Clinical neuroscience, clinical psychology, neurology, neuropsychiatry
- Language: English
- Edited by: Florence Thibaut

Publication details
- History: 1999-present
- Publisher: Taylor & Francis on behalf of the World Federation of Societies of Biological Psychiatry
- Frequency: Quarterly
- Open access: Yes
- Impact factor: 5.986 (2020)

Standard abbreviations
- ISO 4: Dialogues Clin. Neurosci.

Indexing
- ISSN: 1294-8322 (print); 1958-5969 (web)
- OCLC no.: 62869913

Links
- Journal homepage; Online access; Online archive

Dialogues in Clinical Neuroscience is a quarterly peer-reviewed medical journal covering neurology and clinical neuropsychiatry. It was established in 1999 and was originally published by Laboratoires Servier. Starting 2022, the journal is published by Taylor & Francis on behalf of the World Federation of Societies of Biological Psychiatry. The editor-in-chief is Florence Thibaut (Hospital Cochin).

== Abstracting and indexing ==
The journal is abstracted and indexed in:

- Index Medicus/MEDLINE/PubMed
- Science Citation Index Expanded
- Embase
- Scopus
- Elsevier Biobase
