= Michael Schwartz (physician) =

American physician (born 1961)

Michael Schwartz (born October 12, 1961, Brooklyn, New York) is an American physician who specializes in the field of ringside medicine. As Chief Ringside Physician for Professional Boxing and Mixed Martial Arts, he was responsible for creating many of the medical protocols utilized in boxing. He founded the first Medical Association for Professional Ringside Physicians.

== Biography ==
Schwartz was appointed a ringside physician for the State of Connecticut in 1991 and was named to the Medical Advisory Board in 1995. Two years later, he was named Chief Ringside Physician for the State of Connecticut. Schwartz also serves as the Chief Ringside Physician and Chairman of the Medical Advisory Board for both Foxwoods Resort Casino and Mohegan Sun Casino in Connecticut.

In 1997, Schwartz established the American Association of Professional Ringside Physicians (AAPRP) a medical organization created to establish medical protocols for boxing and mixed martial arts worldwide. He served as Chairman of the Medical Advisory Board for the World Boxing Union and is a member of the Medical Advisory Board for the Association of Boxing Commissions (ABC) and the American Association for the Improvement of Boxing (AAIB).

In 2000, after the passage of the Muhammad Ali Boxing Reform Act, he testified on boxing safety at the National Association of Attorneys General Boxing Task Force (NAAG) hearings in New York City and in 2001 for the New York State Assembly on Boxing Reform. In 2005, his Congressional Testimony at the Commerce, Trade, and Consumer Protection Subcommittee hearings helped introduce H.R. 1065, United States Boxing Commission Act, which would have helped establish more national uniformity of safety standards throughout the United States. Additionally, the act would have established a three-member U.S. Boxing Commission within the Department of Commerce. On November 17, 2005, the House voted it down. A similar bill, however, passed the Senate by unanimous consent on May 10, 2005.

Following the defeat of this bill, Schwartz met with Senator John McCain and Congressman Peter King to introduce the Professional Boxing Amendments Act of 2009. This bill would have required the presence of an ambulance and emergency medical personnel during a match and prohibit arranging or fighting a match unless it's approved by the United States Boxing Commission and held in a state that regulates matches in accordance with USBC standards. It would also have required a health and safety disclosure to boxers, require the USBC to establish and maintain a registry of comprehensive medical records, medical denials and suspensions for every licensed boxer and establish a national computerized registry of boxing personnel. The legislation was never voted upon, but was scheduled to be re-introduced in 2011.

In 2011, Schwartz was inducted into the Connecticut Boxing Hall of Fame. He wrote House Calls, a bi-monthly medical column for Hearst Media.

In 2015, he appeared on the reality show Going Deep with David Rees as a consultant for the episode, "How to get Punched". He currently practices Internal Medicine in Darien, Connecticut.
