= Jill Bolte Taylor =

American neuroscientist

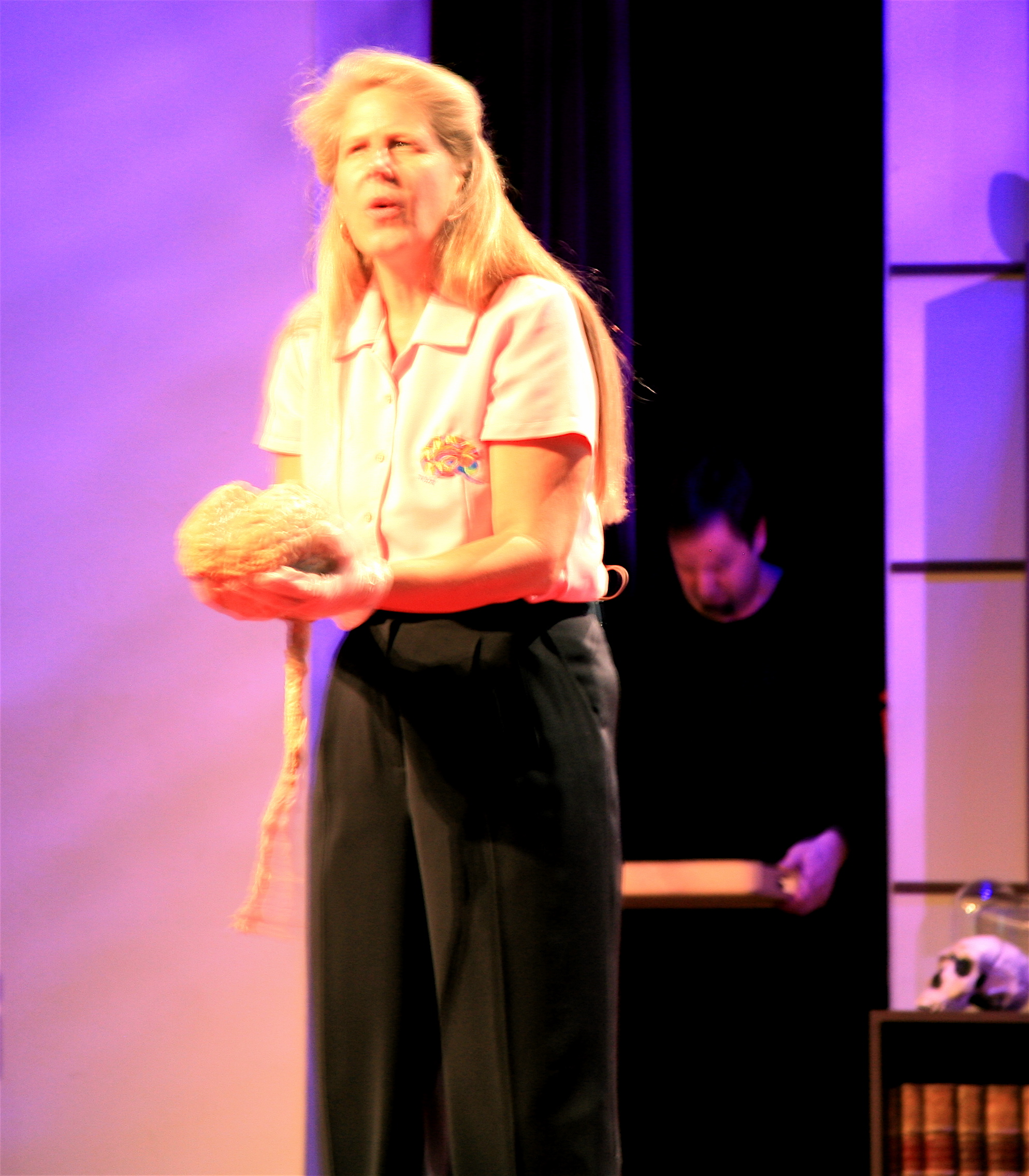
- Bolte Taylor at TED, 2008
- Born: May 4, 1959 (age 67); Louisville, Kentucky, U.S.
- Education: Indiana University Bloomington (B.A.), Indiana State University (Ph.D.)
- Known for: My Stroke of Insight , Whole Brain Living
- Website: DrJillTaylor.com

External videos
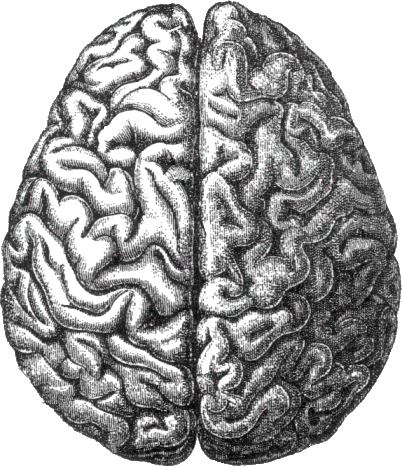
- "A blood vessel exploded in the left half of my brain...", Jill Bolte Taylor, TED Talk

Jill Bolte Taylor (/ˈbɒlti/; born May 4, 1959) is an American neuroanatomist, author, and public speaker.

Taylor began to study severe mental illnesses because of her brother's psychosis. In the early 1990s, she was a postdoctoral fellow at Harvard Medical School, where she was involved in mapping the brain to determine how cells communicate with each other. On December 10, 1996, Taylor had a massive stroke. Her personal experience with a stroke and her subsequent eight-year recovery influenced her work as a scientist and speaker. It is the subject of her 2008 book My Stroke of Insight, A Brain Scientist's Personal Journey. She gave the first TED talk that went viral on the Internet, after which her book became a New York Times bestseller.

In May 2008 she was named to Time Magazine's 2008 Time 100 list of the 100 most influential people in the world. "My Stroke of Insight" received the top "Books for a Better Life" Book Award in the Science category from the New York City Chapter of the National Multiple Sclerosis Society in 2009.

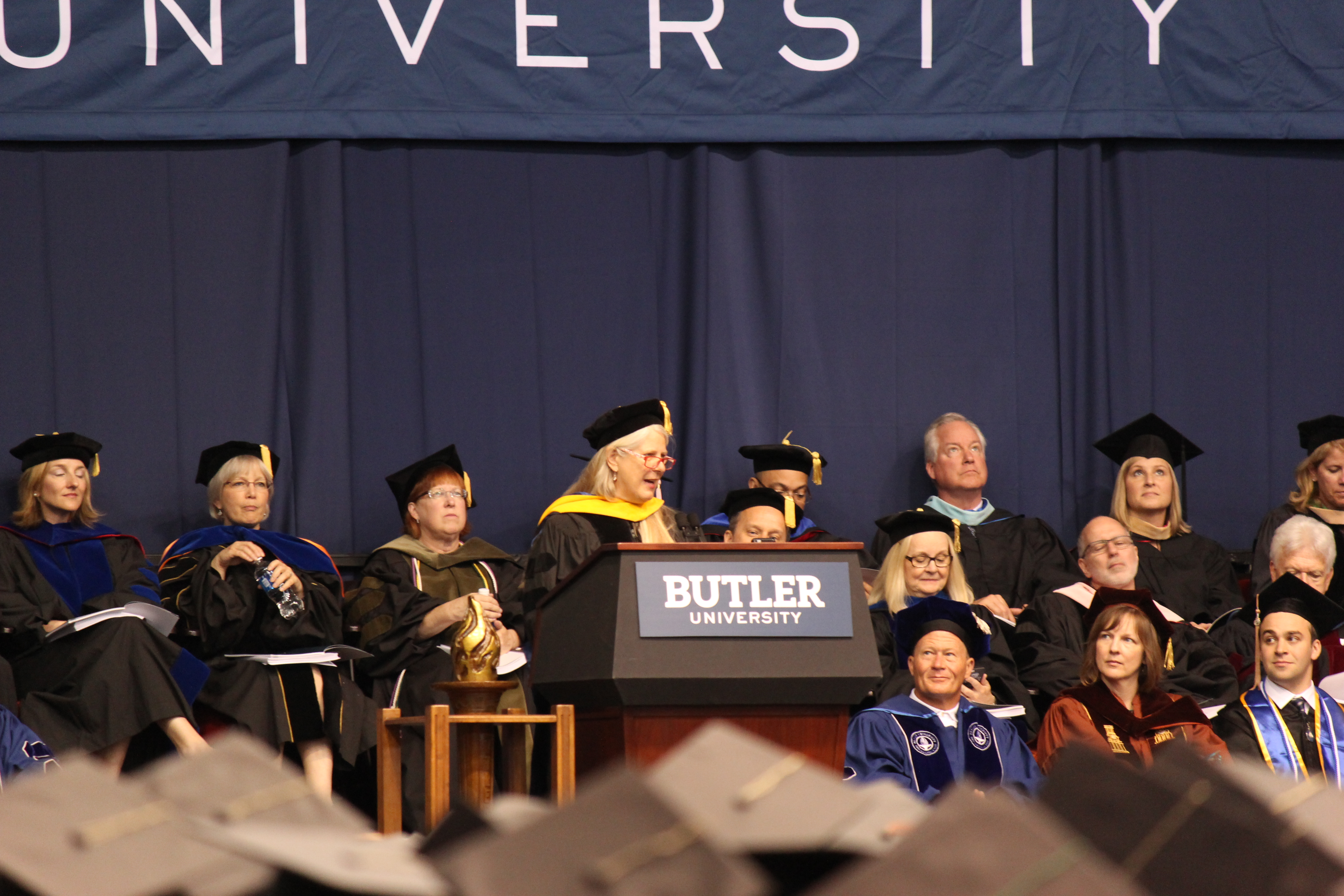
Taylor at the 2016 Butler University commencement, where she received an honorary degree

Taylor founded the nonprofit Jill Bolte Taylor Brains, Inc., she is an adjunct lecturer in anatomy, cell biology and physiology at the Indiana University School of Medicine, and she is the national spokesperson for the Harvard Brain Tissue Resource Center.

In 2021 she published her second book, Whole Brain Living.

== Stroke ==
On December 10, 1996, Taylor woke up to discover that she was experiencing a stroke. The cause proved to be bleeding from an abnormal congenital connection between an artery and a vein in the left hemisphere of her brain, an arteriovenous malformation (AVM). Three weeks later, on December 27, 1996, she underwent major brain surgery at Massachusetts General Hospital (MGH) to remove a golf ball-sized clot that was placing pressure on the language centers in the left hemisphere of her brain.

== My Stroke of Insight ==
Taylor's February 2008 TED Conference talk about her memory of the stroke garnered widespread attention. It became the second most viewed TED talk of all time.

Following her stroke, Taylor published My Stroke of Insight: A Brain Scientist's Personal Journey, about her recovery from the stroke and the insights she gained into the workings of her brain because of it. Published in May 2008, it spent 63 weeks on the New York Times Bestseller List, reaching number four.

Taylor appeared on The Oprah Winfrey Show on October 21, 2008. In her later commencement address at Duke University on May 10, 2009, Winfrey quoted Taylor's assertion that "You are responsible for the energy that you bring" and encouraged the students to assume this same responsibility in their future lives. Taylor was the first guest featured on Oprah's Soul Series podcast.

=== Ballet ===
Cedar Lake Ballet Company made a ballet about My Stroke of Insight called "Orbo Novo." Deborah Jowitt from The Village Voice wrote: "The piece's title, Orbo Novo, is drawn from a 1493 reference to North America by Spanish historian Pietro Martire d'Anghiera. The "new world" that Cherkaoui is exploring, however, is current theories about the brain, and the text that the seventeen dancers speak during the first moments of the 75-minute work comes from My Stroke of Insight, neuroanatomist Jill Bolte Taylor's uncanny recollection of her stroke. The choreography is based on the ramifications of a single resonant idea: the duality between rationality (the left brain) and instinctive, sensual responses (the right brain); between control and the lack of it; between balance and instability, solitude and society."

=== The Cecilia Chorus of New York ===
On May 3, 2019, on the occasion of Taylor's 60th birthday, the Cecilia Chorus of New York presented the world premiere of Fifty Trillion Molecular Geniuses at New York City's Carnegie Hall, setting text from My Stroke of Insight to the music of Johannes Brahms and Edward Elgar.
