= Apprehension (understanding) =

Psychological concept

In psychology, apprehension (Lat. ad, "to"; prehendere, "to seize") is a term applied to a model of consciousness in which nothing is affirmed or denied of the object in question, but the mind is merely aware of ("seizes") it.

"Judgment" (says Reid, ed. Hamilton, i. p. 414) "is an act of the mind, specifically different from simple apprehension or the bare conception of a thing". "Simple apprehension or conception can neither be true nor false." This distinction provides for the large class of mental acts in which we are simply aware of, or "take in" a number of familiar objects, about which we in general make no judgment, unless our attention is suddenly called by a new feature. Or again, two alternatives may be apprehended without any resultant judgment as to their respective merits.

Similarly, G.F. Stout stated that while we have a very vivid idea of a character or an incident in a work of fiction, we can hardly be said in any real sense to have any belief or to make any judgment as to its existence or truth. With this mental state may be compared the purely aesthetic contemplation of music, wherein apart from, say, a false note, the faculty of judgment is for the time inoperative. To these examples may be added the fact that one can fully understand an argument in all its bearings, without in any way judging its validity. Without going into the question fully, it may be pointed out that the distinction between judgment and apprehension is relative. In every kind of thought, there is judgment of some sort in a greater or less degree of prominence.

Judgment and thought are in fact psychologically distinguishable merely as different, though correlative, activities of consciousness. Professor Stout further investigates the phenomenon of apprehension, and comes to the conclusion that "it is possible to distinguish and identify a whole without apprehending any of its constituent details." On the other hand, if the attention focuses itself for a time on the apprehended object, there is an expectation that such details will, as it were, emerge into consciousness. Hence, he describes such apprehension as "implicit", and insofar as the implicit apprehension determines the order of such emergence, he describes it as "schematic".

A good example of this process is the use of formulae in calculations; ordinarily the formula is used without question; if attention is fixed upon it, the steps by which it is shown to be universally applicable emerge, and the "schema " is complete in detail. With this result may be compared Kant's theory of apprehension as a synthetic act (the "synthesis of apprehension") by which the sensory elements of a perception are subjected to the formal conditions of time and space.

== See also ==
- Eureka effect#The Aha! effect and scientific discovery
