= Philosophy, Psychiatry, & Psychology =

- Discipline: Philosophy, psychology, psychiatry, philosophy of science
- Language: English
- Edited by: Bill (K. W. M.) Fulford

Publication details
- History: 1993–present
- Publisher: Johns Hopkins University Press (United States)
- Frequency: Quarterly
- Open access: yes

Standard abbreviations
- ISO 4: Philos. Psychiatry Psychol.
- NLM: Philos Psychiatr Psychol

Indexing
- ISSN: 1071-6076 (print); 1086-3303 (web)
- LCCN: sn93002082
- OCLC no.: 28692470

Links
- Journal homepage; Online access

Philosophy, Psychiatry, & Psychology is an academic journal founded in 1993 and the official publication of the Association for the Advancement of Philosophy and Psychiatry (AAPP) which fosters close associations with the American Psychiatric Association. The journal focuses on the overlap of philosophy, psychiatry, and abnormal psychology. It aims to make clinical material accessible to philosophers while advancing philosophical inquiry into the area of psychology. It includes book reviews, original works, and a variety of special columns.

The founding editor is Bill (K. W. M.) Fulford of the University of Warwick and the co-editor is John Z. Sadler of the University of Texas Southwestern Medical Center. The journal is published quarterly in March, June, September, and December by the Johns Hopkins University Press. Circulation is 127 and the average length of an issue is 92 pages. The Department of Psychiatry at the University of Montreal and the Centre Hospitalier de l'Université de Montréal are sponsoring institutions of the journal.

== Mission ==
The journal is an aspect and element of a broader research activity reflecting the moulding and development of a new specialized system of knowledge, viz., the philosophy of psychiatry which arose in the middle of the nineties as an addition to both analytic philosophy and to the interpretation of mental health care. The new philosophy of psychiatry aims at a better understanding of psychiatry through an analysis of some of its fundamental concepts. Along with the journal Philosophy, Psychiatry, and Psychology, this new discipline has an international network with regular conferences, numerous books, institutions and the masters programme based on the Oxford Textbook of Philosophy and Psychiatry.

== See also ==
- List of psychiatry journals
- List of philosophy journals
