= Sérgio Meira =

Brazilian linguist (born 1968)

- Born: Sérgio Meira de Santa Cruz Oliveira; December 31, 1968 (age 57); Recife, Brazil
- Education: Rice University
- Awards: Lodieska Stockbridge Vaughan Fellowship, Rice University (1998); John W. Gardner Award, Rice University (1999); Mary R. Haas Book Award (2000)
- Scientific career
- Fields: Cariban languages, Anthropology
- Workplaces: Rice University; Radboud University Nijmegen; Museu Paraense Emílio Goeldi; Leiden University; Max Planck Institute for Psycholinguistics; KNAW
- Thesis: A grammar of Tiriyo (1999)
- Doctoral advisor: Spike Gildea

Sérgio Meira de Santa Cruz Oliveira (born December 31, 1968) is a Brazilian linguist who specializes in the Cariban and Tupian language families of lowland South America and in the Tiriyó language in particular. He has worked on the classification of the Cariban language family, and has collected primary linguistic data from speakers of 14 Cariban languages (Note: Akawaio, Akurio, Apalaí, Bakairi, Carijona, Hixkaryana, Kalina, Katxúyana, Kuhikuru, Macushi, Tiriyó, Waiwai, Wayana, and Yukpa.) and 5 non-Cariban languages. (Note: Yaathê/Fulniô (Macro-Je), Kinaray-a (Austronesian), Mawayana (Arawak), Dholuo (Nilo-Saharan), Mawé (Tupian))

== Education and personal life ==
Meira holds a BA and a PhD in Linguistics Theory and Analysis from Rice University. His doctoral research was in collaboration with his supervisor Spike Gildea. Sérgio Meira is a member of the American Anthropological Association (AAA) and of the Society for the Study of the Indigenous Languages of the Americas (SSILA).

In addition to his native Portuguese, Sérgio Meira is proficient in English, (Note: He has completed his higher education in English, and most of his published works are in English.) French, (Note: He holds a Certificat d'études de français pratique from the Alliance française and taught French in Brazil.) and Spanish, (Note: He has published in Spanish.) is moderately fluent in Esperanto, (Note: He holds a Basic Course Certificate from the Brazilian Esperanto Association, and is a self-proclaimed Esperantist whose ideology most closely resembles raumism.) Italian, German, Dutch, Volapük, (Note: He is an academician at the International Volapük Academy, translated from Volapük for the International Rasmus Malling-Hansen Society, and wrote multiple articles for the Volapük Wikipedia.) Romanian, and has a good command of Catalan, Russian, Latin, and other languages.

== Career ==
He is currently a professor at O.P. Jindal Global University. His research at Radboud University Nijmegen focused on historical linguistics, fieldwork and description of the Cariban and Tupian language families, as well as language and cognition.

His work helped in the development of the South American Phonological Inventory Database (SAPhon), the World Atlas of Language Structures (WALS), and Glottolog.

== Volapük ==
Sérgio Meira is one of eight academicians at the International Volapük Academy. He was appointed in 2007 by Brian Reynold Bishop, the seventh cifal and the academy's president at that time. He is also an active member of the Volapük discussion group, which unites most living volapükologists.

Meira translated articles, including Rasmus Malling-Hansen's obituary, from Volapük into English for the International Rasmus Malling-Hansen Society. He also did translation work on the Volapük Wikisource, but later suggested that his work be deleted because it would be considered copyright infringement. Sérgio Meira is one of Andrew Drummond's correspondents who contributed to his knowledge of Volapük material prior to the writing of A Hand-Book of Volapük.

In late October 2006, Sérgio Meira started contributing to the Volapük Wikipedia. He is the main author of most of the featured articles.

== Selected publications ==
Meira has a number of publications; an overview of some highlights is given below:

=== Cariban family ===
- On the Origin of Ablaut in the Cariban Family (2010)
- 'Natural concepts' in the spatial topological domain—adpositional meanings in cross-linguistic perspective: an exercise in semantic typology (2003)
- The Southern Cariban languages and the Cariban family (2005)
- Sobre a origem histórica dos 'prefixos relacionais' das línguas tupí-guaraní (2013)

=== Tiriyó ===
- Rhythmic stress in Tiriyó (Cariban)
