= Volapük Wikipedia =

Volapük-language edition of Wikipedia

- Logo of the Volapük Wikipedia

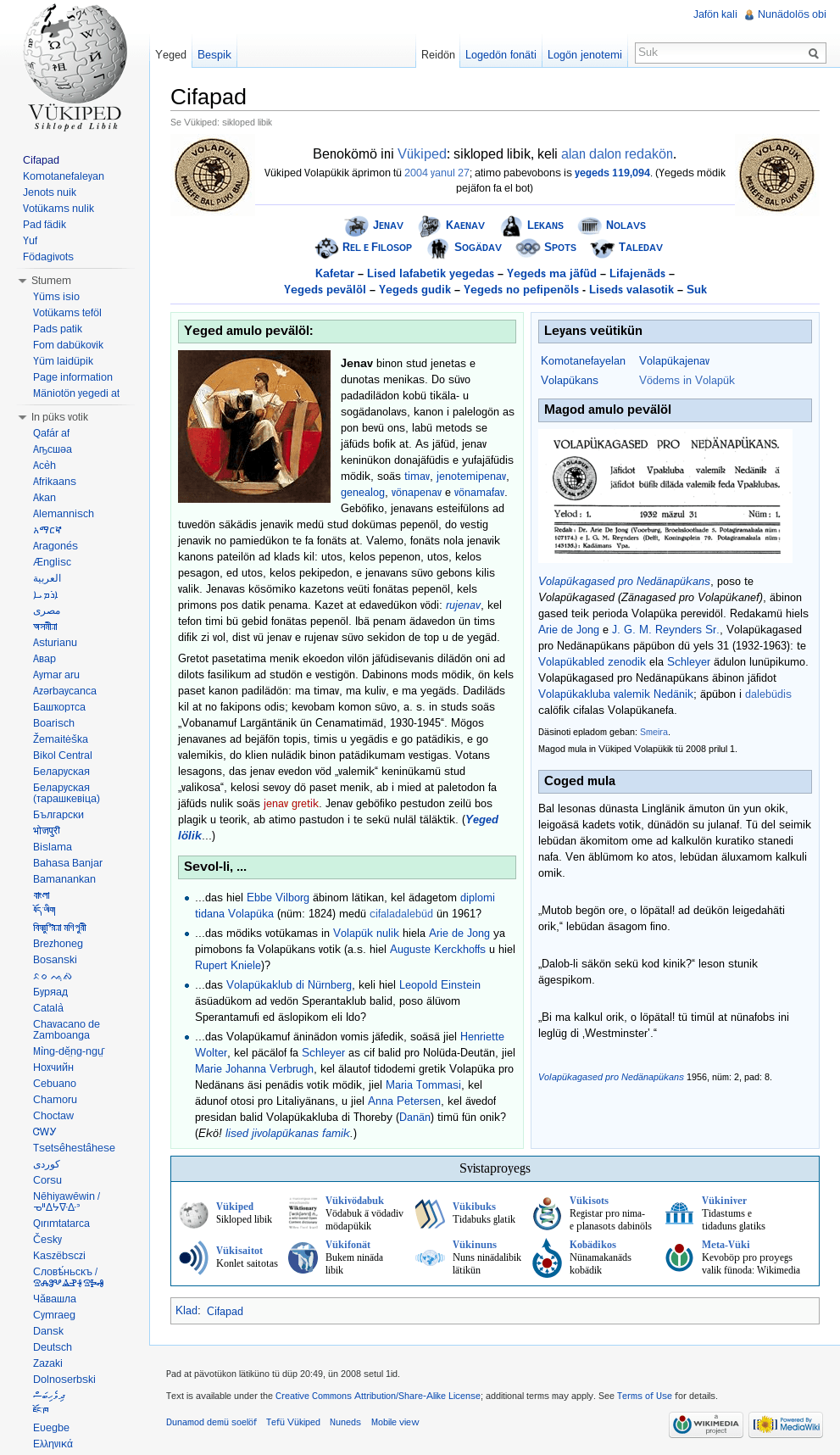
- Main Page of the Volapük Wikipedia in April 2013
- Website type: Internet encyclopedia
- Owner: Wikimedia Foundation
- Website: vo.wikipedia.org
- Commercial: No
- Registration: Optional
- Users: 42,523 registered accounts 186 contributors (Note: Contributors are users who edited at least 10 times since they registered.) (July 2014)
- Launched: February 2003 (created); 27 January 2004; 22 years ago (official)
- Content license: Creative Commons Attribution/ Share-Alike 4.0 (most text also dual-licensed under GFDL); Media licensing varies

The Volapük Wikipedia (Volapük: Vükiped Volapükik) is the Volapük-language edition of the free online encyclopedia Wikipedia. It was created in February 2003, but launched in January 2004. As of 13 November 2026, it is the 107th-largest Wikipedia as measured by the number of articles, with 57,875 articles, and the third-largest Wikipedia in a constructed language, after the Esperanto Wikipedia and the Ido Wikipedia.

The edition is most notable for raising questions about the role of bots on Wikipedia, which initiated the development of policies and alternative measures of Wikipedias' quality. Its large number of bot-generated articles brought attention to the Volapük language, which often exemplifies the extent of Wikipedia's multilingualism across national, minority, dead, and constructed languages alike.

As of 2022, most of the bots' articles have been deleted.

== History ==
The Volapük Wikipedia was created in February 2003, alongside the Croatian, Lithuanian, Armenian, and Bihari Wikipedias. The main page was created on 27 January 2004, marking the edition's official launch. It underwent a redesign on 3 March 2004, and a second one on 15 December 2006, which serves as the basis for the current layout.

In January 2007, Wikipedian Sérgio Meira (Smeira) began to actively use a bot called SmeiraBot to create many new articles about Volapük-related topics, before massively adding stubs about cities primarily in France, Italy, and the United States. MalafayaBot was another active bot on the Volapük Wikipedia; it served primarily to greet new users, add interlanguage links, (Note: Maintenance of interlanguage links on individual editions of Wikipedia has been deprecated since the advent of Wikidata, where interlanguage links from all editions are centralized since 6 March 2013.) and clean up deprecated files, but also created hundreds of stubs about individual years.

Between June and September 2007, the Volapük Wikipedia grew very quickly with the use of bots. On 7 September 2007, it became the 15th Wikipedia to reach the milestone of 100,000 articles, surpassing many editions in much larger languages including Arabic, Turkish, Indonesian, Korean, Vietnamese, and Danish. Starting with only some 5,000 articles in June, it had over 110,000 articles by November of the same year, surpassing even the Esperanto Wikipedia to become the largest Wikipedia in a constructed language. While among the largest editions, the Volapük Wikipedia received a considerable amount of attention from the Wikipedia community, bloggers, and even some media coverage.

In early September, Smeira's work was criticized by a few Wikipedians, including the founder of Esperanto Wikipedia Chuck Smith, who asked about his motive for favoring "quantity at the great expense of quality".

In response to the criticism, Smeira wrote:

I thought I could try to get some new people interested in learning the language and contributing by doing something a little crazy -- like increasing the size of the Volapük Wikipedia as fast as I could, with Python programs for copying and pasting information onto pre-translated templates. In many Wikipedias this had already been done (I actually got the idea from the US city articles in the English Wikipedia).

Soon after, on 21 September 2007, a proposal was submitted to Meta-Wiki to close the Volapük Wikipedia. A long discussion followed, as did eventual disputes and even vandalism. Wikipedians were divided on the issue and the discussion was closed on 6 November 2007. The final decision was to keep the Volapük Wikipedia.

On 25 December 2007, a second, "more balanced request" was created, suggesting a radical cleanup of Volapük Wikipedia, with the aim of removing all bot-created articles and transferring the remaining articles to the Wikimedia Incubator. This proposal was also rejected, on 28 January 2008. The Esperanto Wikipedia's number of articles caught up on 23 September 2009, two years after being surpassed, and it remains the largest Wikipedia in a non-natural language to this day. Since then, the number of articles has remained relatively stable on the Volapük Wikipedia, while the edition's collaborative quality has increased, as more effort is put into improving current articles rather than creating new ones, leading to a doubling of the depth indicator (Note: Depth is a rough indicator of a Wikipedia's collaborative quality showing how frequently its articles are updated. A higher depth usually indicates that articles are more often edited.) since SmeiraBot made its last edit in April 2008, after a total of over 1,150,000.

Following discussions about the status and future of the Volapük Wikipedia, several initiatives led to the creation of measures to promote the development of quality articles throughout Wikipedia. On 7 November 2007, Sérgio Meira introduced the List of Wikipedias by sample of articles, a ranking of Wikipedias based on the size of its articles in a predefined sample based on the List of articles every Wikipedia should have. It was created to serve as a measure of Wikipedias' quality, alternative to the list of Wikipedias by size. Two months later, on 8 January 2008, a Proposal for Policy on overuse of bots in Wikipedias was created on Meta-Wiki. Its purpose was to address perceived problems resulting from "massive flood of additions from bots", but as of July 2014, it remains a proposal and is still in the process of gathering consensus for adoption.

=== Name and logo ===
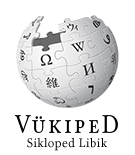
Current logo since May 2013

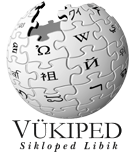
Original logo created in 2005

The word Vükiped is unique among translations of the name Wikipedia because it conveys an adaptation of the original word's connotations while being composed entirely of existent Volapük morphemes. Instead of opting for an habitual calque of the English portmanteau of wiki and encyclopedia, the Volapük Wikipedia's community preferred to devise a neologism, since a borrowing of the prefix wiki- would be inconsistent with Volapük morphology. The resulting Vükiped is composed of morphemes vü- ("inter-", "among") and kiped ("to keep", "to preserve", "to maintain"), and has an implied meaning that roughly translates as: "the effort to maintain this Wikipedia is shared among a group of folks". The word was adopted in early 2004 for its autological conveyance of a central aspect of Wikipedia's nature and because it is both phonologically and orthographically similar to the original term Wikipedia.

The first Wikipedia logo made for the Vükiped was created by Nohat and transferred to Wikimedia Commons on 8 June 2005. Until May 2013, the Volapük Wikipedia was the only edition with over 100,000 articles still using the first generation of Wikipedia's logo. It was among the last Wikipedias to make the switch to the second-generation logo. (Note: As of 29 July 2014, the Limburgish, Zeelandic, Ladino, and Cherokee Wikipedias are the last ones still using the old logo.) The second-generation logo was uploaded to Wikimedia Commons on 12 June 2010, but only published on the Volapük Wikipedia almost 3 years later, on 4 June 2013, because priority was given to a Wikipedia's reach, as opposed to its size. The Volapük Wikipedia is the only edition with over 100,000 articles that has never replaced its logo with a commemorative version upon reaching new milestones.

=== Related projects ===
There is a "!Bang" command available on DuckDuckGo, giving users the ability to redirect a search to the Volapük Wikipedia or to access it directly by typing !wvo. In addition to the Volapük Wikipedia, the Wikimedia Foundation hosts a Volapük Wiktionary (Vükivödabuk), which contains over 22,000 words. There is also an Idiom Neutral wiki hosted by Wikia.

== Statistics ==
Origin of views (07/09 – 12/09)
United States	32.3%
Germany	13.0%
China	7.1%
Canada	6.4%
Netherlands	5.1%
Brazil	3.9%
United Kingdom	3.7%
France	3.0%
Other	25.5%

As of November 2026, the Volapük Wikipedia's approximately 58,000 articles account for approximately 10% of all the articles written in a constructed language, making it the second-largest edition in the family after the Esperanto edition, whose share is 70%. The Volapük edition's previously low depth increased dramatically after the bot's articles were deleted, going from a value of 15 on 1 July 2022 to 277 on 1 January 2023. It currently has a depth of 80.1.

At close to 600 articles per speaker, the Volapük Wikipedia has, by far, the greatest number of articles per speaker of any edition of Wikipedia. These figures were based on a very optimistic estimate of 200 speakers of Volapük. Its editing community currently consists of 1 administrators (2.5% of all active users) and 40 active contributors, of which on average between 1 and 3 are very active every month, (Note: A very active user is one with 100+ edits in the main namespace of a given project over the last 30 days.) and there are in total 8 users with over 1,000 edits (excluding bots).

=== Content ===
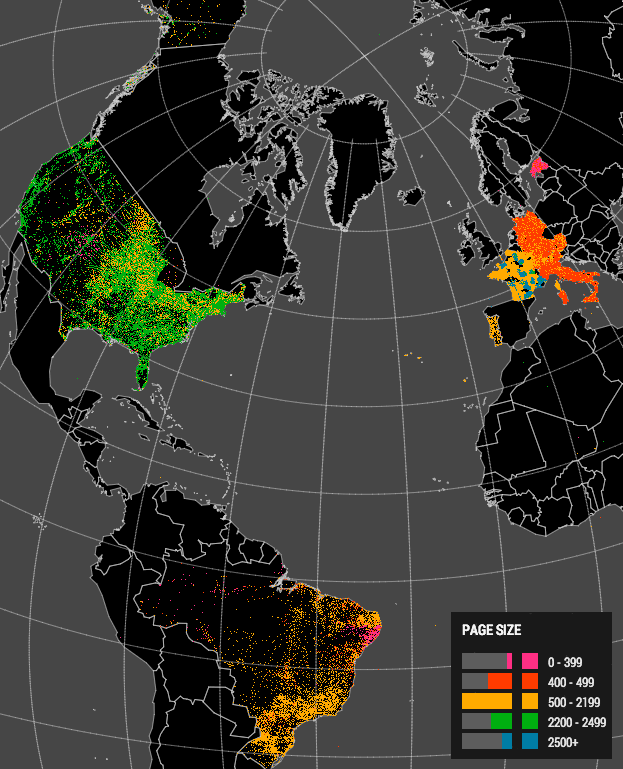
Vükiped's geotagged articles

As it mainly consists of "Poplar Bluff" style articles, it fits the definition of a "botopedia" (Russian: ботопедия), as coined by the Russian Wikipedia. (Note: A botopedia, or ботопедия in Russian, is a Wikipedia whose share of articles created by bots is greater than 50%.) Nevertheless, the Volapük Wikipedia also has 14 featured articles (Yegeds gudik), and a relatively low proportion of 0.12 featured articles per 1000 articles, on par with the Uzbek, Lithuanian, and Danish Wikipedias. It features a rich collection of articles about the history of the Volapük movement that are mostly unique to the Volapük Wikipedia or have shorter translations in other languages. As of 13 November 2026, 9 articles on the English Wikipedia could be expanded by translating from the Volapük Wikipedia.

In 2013, the Oxford Internet Institute created a graph, as part of its Information Geographies project, and found that the Volapük Wikipedia had the 11th-largest amount of geocoded articles of any Wikipedia edition. It also noted that although most editions contained "between 12% (Italian Wikipedia) and 20% (English Wikipedia) of geocoded articles", the Volapük Wikipedia contained 79%, and was deemed "the exception". The graph was based on data from the Terra Incognita project, which was developed by Gavin Baily and Sarah Bagshaw at TraceMedia, and was supported by funding from the Arts Council England Grants for Arts and the National Lottery.

In 2014, Tobias Treppmann created Wikipedia Worldmap, a program for comparative visualization of geocoded Wikipedia articles by language. He compared various pairs of Wikipedia editions, including Esperanto and Volapük, and came to the conclusion that "Esperanto doesn't seem very interested in the U.S., but does cover Japan. Volapük, however, does know the U.S. and has a curiosity for the Baltics and some place in south west Africa".

=== Images ===
The Volapük Wikipedia holds no files locally, relying strictly on Wikimedia Commons for images, sound, and other media files. All of its files are freely available under various licenses and there are thereby no fair use works. It is an approach shared by several other editions lacking an Exemption Doctrine Policy, including i.a. the Spanish, Swedish, Polish, Basque, Czech, Danish, and Latin Wikipedias. The exclusion of fair use images does not hinder the development of the project, because most material pertaining to the Volapük movement was published over a hundred years ago and is therefore in the public domain.

== Notability within the Volapük community ==
In 2013 and 2014, the Volapük Wikipedia was presented as evidence that the internet is helping revive the Volapük movement, albeit merely as a hobby, devoid of its former internationalist aim. As one of the largest works written in the language over the last century, it has an impact on the development of modern Volapük neologisms, particularly geographical terms. On the online discussion group Volapükalised, the Volapük Wikipedia is the subject of multiple discussions about terminology and usage, being often linked to as a reference for language points. Several prominent figures in the development of Volapük, including Arden R. Smith, link to Vükiped on their websites, and it is predominantly featured on the official website of Flenef Bevünetik Volapüka ("The International Community of Friends of Volapük"), maintained by volapükologists Ralph Midgley and Michael Everson.

Beyond the Internet, the Volapük Wikipedia was presented as an illustration of the Volapük community's continuance during the Esperanto, Elvish, and Beyond: The World of Constructed Languages exhibit, held at the Cleveland Public Library from May through August 2008 and at the Third Language Creation Conference on 21–22 March 2009. It was created by Donald Boozer, then a Subject Department Librarian in Literature, and currently Coordinator of Ohio's statewide online reference service (KnowItNow24x7), as well as librarian and secretary of the Language Creation Society.

== See also ==
- History of Wikipedia
- List of Wikipedias
- Volapük
