= Albert Sleumer =

Doctor and a leader of the Volapük movement

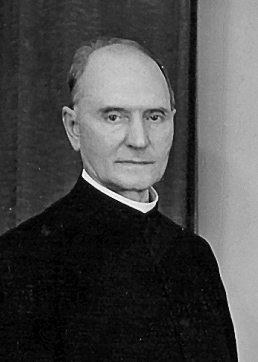
- Occupation: Doctor
- Known for: Second Cifal (1912–1948) of the Volapük movement
- Medical career
- Profession: Catholic priest
- Notable works: Ein berühmter katholischer Erfinder. (Joh. Martin Schleyer, gest. 16. August 1912.) Ein Lebensbild

Albert Sleumer (1876–1964) ([ˈɑɫbərt ˈslɔʏmər]), a doctor, was the second Cifal (1912–1948) of the Volapük movement. Like Johann Martin Schleyer, Sleumer was a Catholic priest.

== Biography ==
Sleumer began learning Volapük only in 1892—after the "classical period" of the Volapük movement, directly from Schleyer. In 1910, Schleyer named Sleumer his successor, and when he died in 1912, Sleumer became Cifal.

In 1921, Arie de Jong proposed to Sleumer his plan for reforming the language, and when this reform was prepared in 1929, he put the whole not only to Sleumer, but also to Jacob Sprenger. Sleumer, De Jong and Sprenger were the last group who led the linguistic development of Volapük like a small school.

In 1934, Sleumer issued a decree regulating the rights and duties of Cifals; in 1948 he resigned as Cifal, appointing Jacob Sprenger as his successor.

Sleumer was a famous Latinist and theologian, defending in 1906 the need for the Church censure.

== Works ==
- 1914. Ein berühmter katholischer Erfinder. (Joh. Martin Schleyer, gest. 16. August 1912.) Ein Lebensbild. Volksaufklärung, n. 180. Klagenfurt: St. Josefs-Vereins-Buchdr. (Republished in 1981 as Johann Martin Schleyer. <18. Juli 1831 - 16. August 1912>. Ein Lebensbild. Mit einem Nachwort von Reinhard Haupenthal. Saarbrücken: Edition Iltis.)
- 1926. Kirchenlateinisches Wörterbuch. (Reissue of this real pearl among such dictionaries in 2006 by the publishing house Georg Olms/Hildesheim-Zurich-New York, ISBN 978-3-487-09333-8)
- 1935. "Volapükamuf bü tumyel lafik", in Volapükagased pro Nedänapükans, Nüm: 2, Pads: 9-14. (Original text.)
- 1938a. "Pük menik", in Volapükagased pro Nedänapükans, Nüm: 6, Pads: 44-47. (Original text.)
- 1938b. "Daved Volapüka", in Volapükagased pro Nedänapükans, Nüm: 4, Pads: 26-30, e Nüm: 5, Pads: 34-38. (Original text.)
- 1939a. "Hieroglifaston di ‚Rosette‛ in Dältad di ‚Nile‛", in Volapükagased pro Nedänapükans, Nüm: 1, Pads: 2-7. (Original text.)
- 1939b. "Bödaflen de ‚Joplin‛, ‚MO‛ (Tats Pebalöl Nolüda-Meropa)", in Volapükagased pro Nedänapükans, Nüm: 3, Pads: 28-29. (Original text.)
- 1939c. "Dö Mäsiat dobik e pats votik se rujenav relik", Volapükagased pro Nedänapükans, Nüm: 4, Pads: 36-38, Nüm: 5, Pads: 44-46, e Nüm: 6, Pads: 50-55. (Original text.)
- 1940. "Yesus Kristus in Kuraan Slamanas", in Volapükagased pro Nedänapükans, Nüm: 1, Pads: 4-9. (Original text.)
- 1949. "Kardinan: ‚Mezzofanti‛: pükinolan mu süperöl", in Volapükagaseds pro Nedänapükans, Nüm: 3, Pads: 11-12, Nüm: 4, Pads: 15-16, Nüm: 5, Pads: 19-20, Nüm: 6, Pads: 21-22. (Original text.)
- 1951. "Namapenäds e buks bisarik", in Volapükagased pro Nedänapükans, Nüm: 3, Pads: 10-12, Nüm: 4, Pad: 13. (Original text.)
- 1962. Deutsch-kirchenlateinisches Wörterbuch. 3rde edition of the edition of Ferd. Dümmler/Bonno on occasion of the inauguration of the Second Vatican Council.
