= Michael Everson =

American-Irish type designer (born 1963)

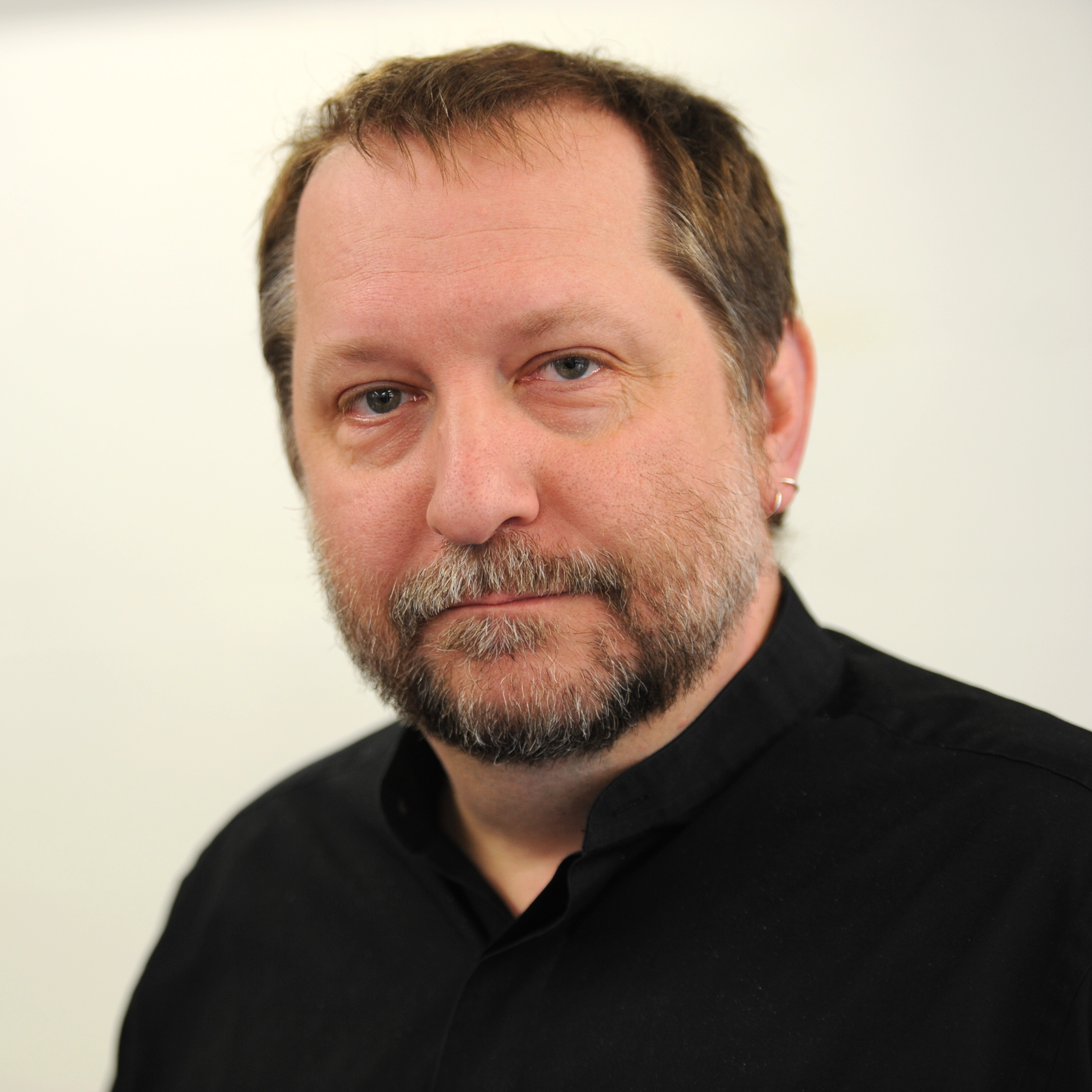
- Born: January 1963 (age 63); Norristown, Pennsylvania, U.S.
- Occupations: linguist, publisher

Michael Everson (born January 1963) is an American and Irish linguist, script encoder, typesetter, type designer and publisher. He runs a publishing company called Evertype, through which he has published more than one hundred books since 2006.

His central area of expertise is with writing systems of the world, specifically in the representation of these systems in formats for computer and digital media. In 2003 Rick McGowan said he was "probably the world's leading expert in the computer encoding of scripts" for his work to add a wide variety of scripts and characters to the Universal Character Set. Since 1993, he has written more than two hundred proposals which have added thousands of characters to ISO/IEC 10646 and the Unicode standard; as of 2003, he was credited as the leading contributor of Unicode proposals.

== Life ==
Everson was born in Norristown, Pennsylvania, United States, and moved to Tucson, Arizona, at the age of 12. His interest in the works of J. R. R. Tolkien led him to study Old English and then other Germanic languages. He read German, Spanish, and French for his B.A. at the University of Arizona (1985), and the History of Religions and Indo-European linguistics for his M.A. at the University of California, Los Angeles (1988).

In 1989, a former professor, Dr. Marija Gimbutas, asked him to read a paper on Basque mythology at an Indo-Europeanist Conference held in Ireland; shortly thereafter he moved to Dublin, where he studied as a Fulbright Scholar in the Faculty of Celtic Studies, University College Dublin (1991). He became a naturalized Irish citizen in 2000, although he retains American citizenship.

== Work ==
Everson is active in supporting minority-language communities, especially in the fields of character encoding standardization and internationalization. In addition to being one of the primary contributing editors of the Unicode Standard, he is also a contributing editor to ISO/IEC 10646, registrar for ISO 15924, and subtag reviewer for BCP 47. He has contributed to the encoding of many scripts and characters in those standards, receiving the Unicode Bulldog Award in 2000 for his technical contributions to the development and promotion of the Unicode Standard. In 2004, Everson was appointed convenor of ISO TC46/WG3 (Conversion of Written Languages), which is responsible for transliteration standards.

Everson is one of the co-editors (along with Rick McGowan, Ken Whistler, and V.S. Umamaheswaran) of the Unicode roadmaps that detail actual and proposed allocations for current and future Unicode scripts and blocks.

On July 1, 2012, Everson was appointed to the Volapük Academy by the Cifal, Brian R. Bishop, for his work in Volapük publishing.

=== Encoding of scripts ===
Everson has been actively involved in the encoding of many scripts in the Unicode and ISO/IEC 10646 standards, including Avestan, Balinese, Bamum, Bassa Vah, Batak, Braille, Brāhmī, Buginese, Buhid, Unified Canadian Aboriginal Syllabics, Carian, Cham, Cherokee, Coptic, Cuneiform, Cypriot, Deseret, Duployan, Egyptian hieroglyphs, Elbasan, Ethiopic, Georgian, Glagolitic, Gothic, Hanunóo, Imperial Aramaic, Inscriptional Pahlavi, Inscriptional Parthian, Javanese, Kayah Li, Khmer, Lepcha, Limbu, Linear A, Linear B, Lycian, Lydian, Mandaic, Manichaean, Meitei Mayek, Mongolian, Myanmar, Nabataean, New Tai Lue, N'Ko, Ogham, Ol Chiki, Old Hungarian, Old Italic, Old North Arabian, Old Persian, Old South Arabian, Old Turkic, Osmanya, Palmyrene, Phaistos Disc, Phoenician, Rejang, Runic, Samaritan, Saurashtra, Shavian, Sinhala, Sundanese, Tagalog, Tagbanwa, Tai Le, Tai Tham, Thaana, Tibetan, Ugaritic, Vai, and Yi, as well as many characters belonging to the Latin, Greek, Cyrillic, and Arabic scripts.

=== Encoding of symbols ===
Everson authored or co-authored proposals for many symbol characters for encoding into Unicode and ISO/IEC 10646. Among those proposals submitted to ISO/IEC JTC 1/SC 2/WG 2 that have been accepted and encoded: N2586R (U+267E ♾ PERMANENT PAPER SIGN and four other miscellaneous symbols admitted into Unicode 4.1), N3727 (the 26 Regional Indicator Symbols used in pairs to generate national flags in emoji contexts; adopted into Unicode 6.0), and N4783R2 (chess notation symbols encoded into Unicode 11.0).

Among proposals that have not yet been approved for encoding: N1866 (an early proposal for encoding Blissymbols into the Supplementary Multilingual Plane of Unicode; still listed in the SMP roadmap as of Unicode 15.0 although no further action had been taken on it for years).

Everson, along with Doug Ewell, Rebecca Bettencourt, Ricardo Bánffy, Eduardo Marín Silva, Elias Mårtenson, Mark Shoulson, Shawn Steele, and Rebecca Turner, is a contributor to the Terminals Working Group researching obscure characters found in legacy character sets used by home computers (or "microcomputers"), terminals, and other legacy devices made from the mid-1970s until the mid-1980s; thanks to their proposal L2/19-025, 212 graphic characters for compatibility with MSX, Commodore 64, and other microcomputers of the era, as well as Teletext, were encoded in the Symbols for Legacy Computing block, while 731 additional characters from L2/21-235 have been accepted for a future version of the standard.

=== Font development ===
In 1995, he designed a Unicode font, Everson Mono, a monospaced typeface with more than 4,800 characters. This font was the third Unicode-encoded font to contain a large number of characters from many character blocks, after Lucida Sans Unicode and Unihan font (both 1993). In 2007, he was commissioned by the International Association of Coptic Studies to create a standard free Unicode 5.1 font for Coptic, Antinoou, using the Sahidic style.

=== Conscript Unicode Registry ===
Together with John Cowan, he is also responsible for the ConScript Unicode Registry, a project to coordinate the mapping of artificial scripts into the Unicode Private Use Area. Among the scripts encoded in the CSUR, Shavian and Deseret were eventually formally adopted into Unicode; two other conscripts under consideration are Tolkien's scripts of Tengwar and Cirth. Everson eventually abandoned work on the ConScript registry around 2008 due to his schedule being too busy to devote further time to it.

=== Language and locale information ===
Everson has also created locale and language information for many languages, from support for the Irish language and the other Celtic languages to the minority Languages of Finland. In 2000, together with Trond Trosterud, he co-authored Software localization into Nynorsk Norwegian, a report commissioned by the Norwegian Language Council. In 2003 he was commissioned by the United Nations Development Programme to prepare a report on the computer locale requirements for the major languages of Afghanistan (Pashto, Dari, and Uzbek), co-authored by Roozbeh Pournader, which was endorsed by the Ministry of Communications of the Afghan Transitional Islamic Administration. More recently, UNESCO's Initiative B@bel funded Everson's work to encode the N'Ko and Balinese scripts. He is also an expert coordinating the registration of IETF language tags.

=== Work on a standard for Cornish ===
In 2007, Everson co-authored a proposal for a new standard written form of Cornish, called Kernowek Standard. Following the publication of the Standard Written Form in 2008, Everson and a group of other users examined the specification and implemented a set of modifications to it, publishing a formal specification in 2012.

=== Publishing at Evertype ===
As of March 2014 Everson operates a publishing company, Evertype, through which he has published a total of 295 books. These include a wide range of titles by various authors and editors, with Everson himself as co-author of one, editor of several, and having adapted or revised several more. He also designed fonts for several.

Everson has a particular interest in Gaelic typeface design, and does a considerable amount of work typesetting books in Irish for publication by Evertype.

Another project consists of his publications of translations of Alice's Adventures in Wonderland in many languages, amongst which are minority languages and constructed languages. Translations are available in Cornish, Esperanto, French, German, Hawaiian, Irish, Italian, Jèrriais, Ladino, Latin, Lingua Franca Nova, Lingwa de planeta, Low German, Manx, Mennonite Low German, Borain Picard, Sambahsa, Scots, Shavian transliteration, Swedish, Ulster Scots and Welsh, with several other translations being prepared.
