= Waldemar Rosenberger =

Waldemar Rosenberger, (Russian: Владимир Карлович Розенбергер, Vladimir Karlovich Rozenberger, 1848–1918) from Saint Petersburg, Russian Empire, became director of the International Volapük Academy in 1892. Under his leadership, the Academy began to experiment more with the Volapük language. In 1902 the Academy proposed a heavily revised version which was known as Neutral and later Idiom Neutral.
