= Nal Bino =

Constructed language created in 1886

- Created by: Sebestian Verheggen
- Date: 1886
- Setting and usage: International auxiliary language
- Extinct: c. 1900
- Purpose: Constructed language: Volapük; Nal Bino
- Writing system: Latin

Language codes
- ISO 639-3: None (mis)
- Glottolog: None
- IETF: art-x-nanbino

Nal Bino is a constructed language developed by Sébastian Verheggen in 1886.

== History ==
Nal Bino is related to Johann Martin Schleyer's more successful Volapük language of 1879, but avoids the use of the contentious umlauts that are used throughout Volapük. The third international Volapük convention was held in Paris in 1889, with all proceedings held in Volapük. Some enthusiasts started to ask Schleyer to make minor changes to the language, but met with stubborn resistance. Schleyer found himself excluded from decisions by the Volapük Academy on how the language would evolve, and quit. Others also left the movement and created fresh languages such as Nal Bino.

When he introduced his "simple, easy and harmonious" Nal Bino language in 1886, Verheggen made a passionate plea for the governments of the civilized nations of the world to meet and agree on one universal language, in the same way that they agreed on standards for post and telecommunications. Nal Bino's invention brought the number of well-defined universal languages to three, including Volapük and Pasilingua. Verheggen's language avoided some of the drawbacks of Volapük, but introduced various new problems. It did not survive for long.

== Language concepts ==
The language has an alphabet with 24 consonants and 24 vowels. Each vowel has a short and a long form, with the short form represented by the mirror image of the symbol for the long form. All word roots are monosyllables ending with a consonant. The different forms of nouns and verbs follow an extremely consistent pattern. Some sample sentences:

Sample	Translation
Ma bo setya	I slept
Sa bada rie	He sees you
Za bo zukya	It snowed

== Bibliography ==
- Verheggen, Sébastian (1886). Nal Bino (Langue universelle): Projet d'une langue universelle, simple, facile & harmonieuse. G. Thiriart.
