= Tai Le =

Tai Le may refer to:

- Tai Le script
- Tai Nüa language / Tai Le language
- Tai Le (Unicode block), a block of Unicode characters for the Tai Le script.

== See also ==
- Tai Lü (disambiguation)
