= Tai Lue =

Tai Lue or Tai Lü may refer to:

- Tai Lue language
- Tai Lue people

== See also ==
- New Tai Lue (disambiguation)
