= Kosmopolan =

Defunct Volapük and English gazette

Kosmopolan (English: The Cosmopolitan) is a defunct Volapük and English quarterly gazette issued between 1891 and 1897.

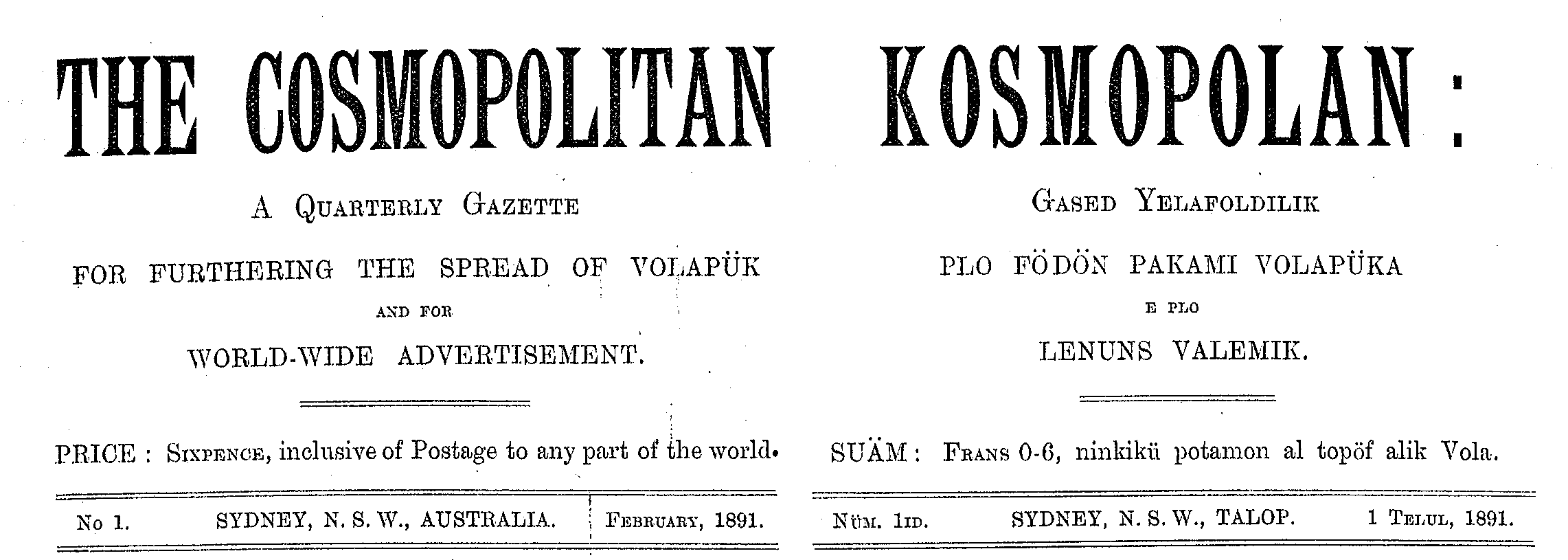
Frontispiece of the first issue of Kosmopolan (1891)

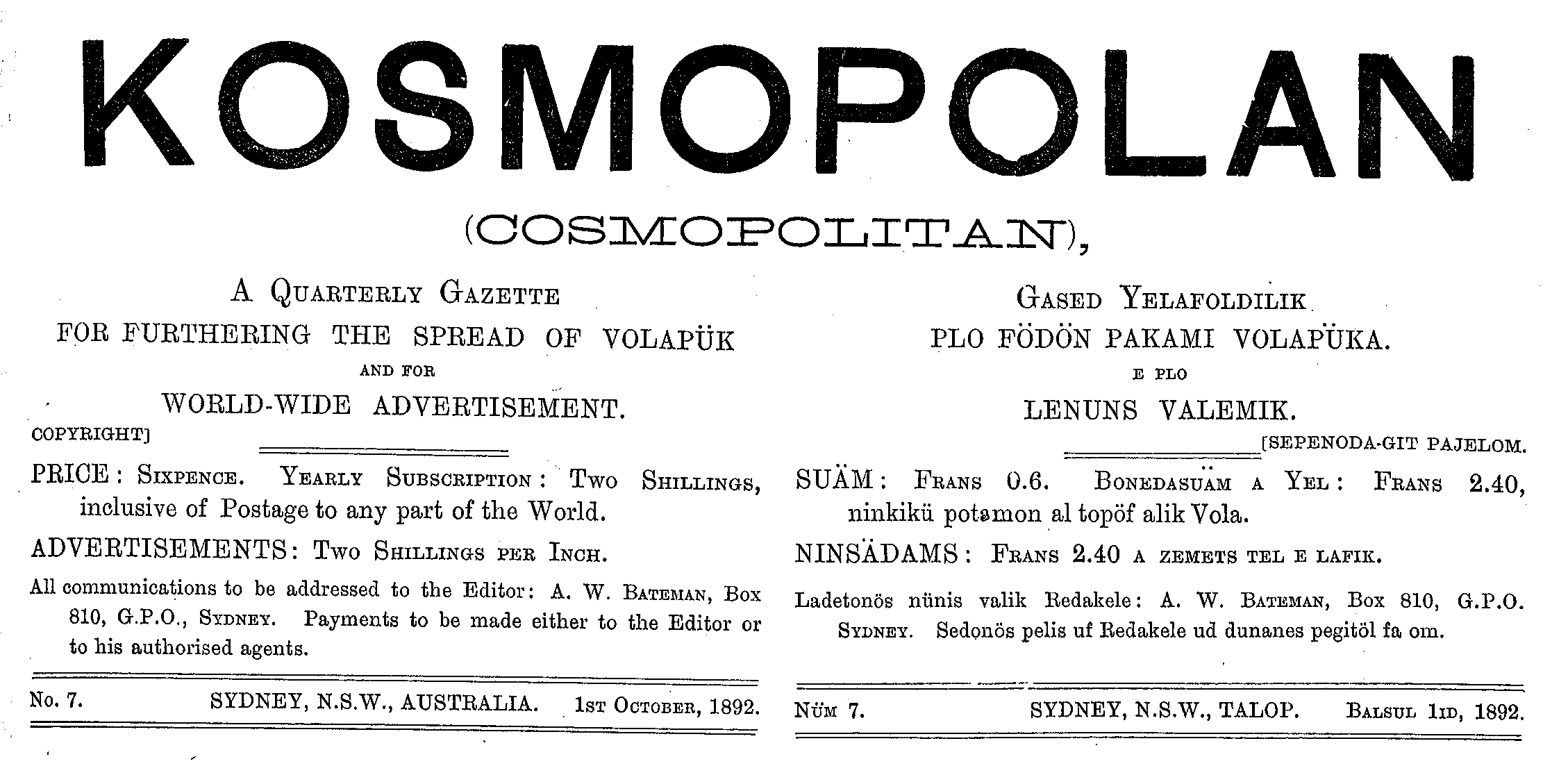
New frontispiece (from issue 7 on) of Kosmopolan (1892)
