= Cifal =

Leader of the Volapük movement

The cifal (meaning the biggest, most senior head, chief or director in Volapük; itself coming from English "chief") is the leader of the Volapük movement. The first cifal was Johann Martin Schleyer until 1889 when he dismissed the entire Academy of Volapük, and the Academy dismissed Schleyer as the cifal and the movement divided between the followers of the cifal and of the Academy. Schleyer, who also held the title of datuval (meaning "the great discoverer" in Volapük) lived until 1912 but before his death left the title to Albert Sleumer who, in 1934, codified the rights and obligations of the cifal. Typically, the cifal decides on matters of grammar and vocabulary.

== List ==
Since the title of Cifal was created, there have been seven holders of the position:

List of Cifals
Name	Image	Period	Notes	Ref.
Johann Martin Schleyer		1879–1912		
Albert Sleumer		1912–1948		
Jakob Sprenger		1948–1950		
Johann Schmidt		1950–1977		
Filippus Johann Krüger		1977–1983		
Brian Reynold Bishop		1984–2014		
Hermann Philipps		2014–		
