= Ralph Midgley =

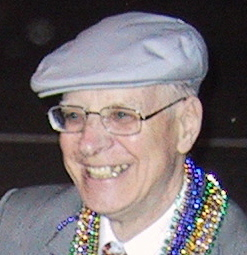
Ralph Midgley in 2004

Ralph Midgley (25 November 1929 – 23 May 2024) was the Guvan ('Administrator') of the Volapük Community (according to an edict of the former Cifal Brian Bishop made on 1 January 2006). He was active in the Volapük community between 1972 and 2015. He was the author of a number of online teaching courses released under the names Volapük for Everyone and Volapük in Action, as well as a brief introduction called Volapük vifik ('Quick Volapük'). He formed the Flenef Bevünetik Volapüka ('The International Community of Friends of Volapük'), and published a magazine Vög Volapüka ('The Voice of Volapük') which followed on from a publication known as Sirkülapenäd ('The Newsletter'). His enthusiastic activism in, and promotion of Volapük was a significant contributory factor to the number of people who studied and learnt the language at that time.

He became the administrator of the Volapük movement in 2006 and was a member of the Volapük Academy from 2007 until 2015. In 2015, he stepped down from all of his engagements in the Volapük movement due to his age and failing eyesight. He was made an honorary academician (stimakadämal) of the International Volapük Society on December 1, 2015, according to an official edict by the current Cifal, Hermann Phillips.

Midgley lived in Scunthorpe, North Lincolnshire in northern England.

Midgley was notable for having translated Alice's Adventures in Wonderland into both Neo and Volapük.
