= New Tai Lue =

New Tai Lue refers to:

- New Tai Lue alphabet, alphabet for writing the Tai Lü language
- New Tai Lue (Unicode block), block of Unicode characters for the New Tai Lue alphabet
