= New Tai Lue (Unicode block) =

- Range: U+1980..U+19DF (96 code points)
- Plane: BMP
- Scripts: New Tai Lue
- Major alphabets: Tai Lü
- Assigned: 83 code points
- Unused: 13 reserved code points

Unicode Version History
- 4.1 (2005): 80 (+80)
- 5.2 (2009): 83 (+3)

Unicode documentation
- Code chart ∣ Web page

Graphical representation of the New Tai Lue Unicode block

New Tai Lue is a Unicode block containing characters for writing the Tai Lü language.

New Tai Lue^{[1]}^{[2]} Official Unicode Consortium code chart (PDF)
	0	1	2	3	4	5	6	7	8	9	A	B	C	D	E	F
U+198x	ᦀ	ᦁ	ᦂ	ᦃ	ᦄ	ᦅ	ᦆ	ᦇ	ᦈ	ᦉ	ᦊ	ᦋ	ᦌ	ᦍ	ᦎ	ᦏ
U+199x	ᦐ	ᦑ	ᦒ	ᦓ	ᦔ	ᦕ	ᦖ	ᦗ	ᦘ	ᦙ	ᦚ	ᦛ	ᦜ	ᦝ	ᦞ	ᦟ
U+19Ax	ᦠ	ᦡ	ᦢ	ᦣ	ᦤ	ᦥ	ᦦ	ᦧ	ᦨ	ᦩ	ᦪ	ᦫ				
U+19Bx	ᦰ	ᦱ	ᦲ	ᦳ	ᦴ	ᦵ	ᦶ	ᦷ	ᦸ	ᦹ	ᦺ	ᦻ	ᦼ	ᦽ	ᦾ	ᦿ
U+19Cx	ᧀ	ᧁ	ᧂ	ᧃ	ᧄ	ᧅ	ᧆ	ᧇ	ᧈ	ᧉ						
U+19Dx	᧐	᧑	᧒	᧓	᧔	᧕	᧖	᧗	᧘	᧙	᧚				᧞	᧟
Notes 1.As of Unicode version 17.0 2.Grey areas indicate non-assigned code points

== History ==
The following Unicode-related documents record the purpose and process of defining specific characters in the New Tai Lue block:

Version	Final code points (Note: Proposed code points and characters names may differ from final code points and names)	Count	L2 ID	WG2 ID	Document
4.1	U+1980..19A9, 19B0..19C9, 19D0..19D9, 19DE..19DF	80		N967	Proposal for encoding New Xishuangbanna Dai script, 1994-01-01
4.1	U+1980..19A9, 19B0..19C9, 19D0..19D9, 19DE..19DF	80	X3L2/94-088	N1013	The Motion on the Coding of the Old Xishuang Banna Dai Writing, Entering into BMP of ISO/IEC 10646, 1994-04-18
4.1	U+1980..19A9, 19B0..19C9, 19D0..19D9, 19DE..19DF	80		N1099 (pdf, doc)	The motion on coding of the Old Xishuang Banna Dai Writing Entering into BMP of ISO/IEC 10646, 1994-10-10
4.1	U+1980..19A9, 19B0..19C9, 19D0..19D9, 19DE..19DF	80	L2/99-243		Constable, Peter (1999-08-13), Proposal for encoding New Tai Lue script in Unicode/ISO-IEC 10646
4.1	U+1980..19A9, 19B0..19C9, 19D0..19D9, 19DE..19DF	80	L2/99-247	N2044	Everson, Michael (1999-08-13), On encoding New Tai Lue
4.1	U+1980..19A9, 19B0..19C9, 19D0..19D9, 19DE..19DF	80	L2/00-290	N2242	Proposal for encoding Xinshuang Banna Dai script on BMP of ISO/IEC 10646, 2000-08-27
4.1	U+1980..19A9, 19B0..19C9, 19D0..19D9, 19DE..19DF	80	L2/00-362	N2242R	Proposal for encoding Xinshuang Banna Dai script on BMP of ISO/IEC 10646, 2000-08-27
4.1	U+1980..19A9, 19B0..19C9, 19D0..19D9, 19DE..19DF	80	L2/01-170 (html, txt)		Constable, Peter (2001-04-17), Comments on SC2/WG2 N2242
4.1	U+1980..19A9, 19B0..19C9, 19D0..19D9, 19DE..19DF	80	L2/01-348	N2371	Proposal Summary Form for Dai scripts, 2001-09-14
4.1	U+1980..19A9, 19B0..19C9, 19D0..19D9, 19DE..19DF	80	L2/03-321	N2634	Everson, Michael (2003-09-29), Proposal to encode the Tai Lue script in the BMP of the UCS
4.1	U+1980..19A9, 19B0..19C9, 19D0..19D9, 19DE..19DF	80	L2/03-363	N2660	Constable, Peter (2003-10-16), Comments on N2634, proposal to encode the Tai Lue script in the BMP of the UCS
4.1	U+1980..19A9, 19B0..19C9, 19D0..19D9, 19DE..19DF	80	L2/03-371	N2671	Constable, Peter (2003-10-16), Comments on N2665, Opinions on Encoding Tai Lue
4.1	U+1980..19A9, 19B0..19C9, 19D0..19D9, 19DE..19DF	80	L2/03-365	N2665	Opinions on Encoding Tai Lue, 2003-10-20
4.1	U+1980..19A9, 19B0..19C9, 19D0..19D9, 19DE..19DF	80	L2/04-147	N2748	Proposal on encoding New Tai Lue, 2004-04-29
4.1	U+1980..19A9, 19B0..19C9, 19D0..19D9, 19DE..19DF	80	L2/04-164	N2761	Everson, Michael (2004-05-13), On the ordering of the Tai Lue script in the PDAM code chart
4.1	U+1980..19A9, 19B0..19C9, 19D0..19D9, 19DE..19DF	80	L2/04-272	N2826	Constable, Peter (2004-06-15), Evidence Regarding Decomposition of the VA Mark in Tai Lue Script
4.1	U+1980..19A9, 19B0..19C9, 19D0..19D9, 19DE..19DF	80	L2/04-271	N2825	Consensus on the encoding of the New Tai Lue script in the PDAM code chart, 2004-06-22
4.1	U+1980..19A9, 19B0..19C9, 19D0..19D9, 19DE..19DF	80	L2/04-156R2		Moore, Lisa (2004-08-13), "New Tai Lue (A.15)", UTC #99 Minutes
4.1	U+1980..19A9, 19B0..19C9, 19D0..19D9, 19DE..19DF	80	L2/05-058		Whistler, Ken (2005-02-03), "B. New Tai Lue character name changes", WG2 Consent Docket, Part 1: Unicode 4.1 Issues
4.1	U+1980..19A9, 19B0..19C9, 19D0..19D9, 19DE..19DF	80	L2/05-026		Moore, Lisa (2005-05-16), "WG2 - Unicode 4.1 Consent Docket (B.1.16.1)", UTC #102 Minutes
4.1	U+1980..19A9, 19B0..19C9, 19D0..19D9, 19DE..19DF	80	L2/08-318	N3453 (pdf, doc)	Umamaheswaran, V. S. (2008-08-13), "M52.1", Unconfirmed minutes of WG 2 meeting 52, "Change the glyph for 19D1 NEW TAI LUE DIGIT ONE to the glyph shown on the top line in Example 1 in document N3380"
4.1	U+1980..19A9, 19B0..19C9, 19D0..19D9, 19DE..19DF	80	L2/08-161R2		Moore, Lisa (2008-11-05), "Consensus 115-C13", UTC #115 Minutes, "Approve the glyph change for U+19D1 NEW TAI LUE DIGIT ONE."
4.1	U+1980..19A9, 19B0..19C9, 19D0..19D9, 19DE..19DF	80	L2/10-221		Moore, Lisa (2010-08-23), "B.10.13.1.3 and B.13.1", UTC #124 / L2 #221 Minutes
4.1	U+1980..19A9, 19B0..19C9, 19D0..19D9, 19DE..19DF	80	L2/14-090		Hosken, Martin (2014-04-23), Proposal to Deprecate and add 4 characters to the New Tai Lue block
4.1	U+1980..19A9, 19B0..19C9, 19D0..19D9, 19DE..19DF	80	L2/14-129		Anderson, Deborah; Whistler, Ken; McGowan, Rick; Pournader, Roozbeh (2014-05-02), "5", Recommendations to UTC #139 May 2014 on Script Proposals
4.1	U+1980..19A9, 19B0..19C9, 19D0..19D9, 19DE..19DF	80	L2/14-195		Pournader, Roozbeh (2014-08-05), Data on the usage of left-side spacing marks in New Tai Lue
4.1	U+1980..19A9, 19B0..19C9, 19D0..19D9, 19DE..19DF	80	L2/14-263		PRI #281: Proposed encoding model change for New Tai Lue, Background Document, 2014-08-29
4.1	U+1980..19A9, 19B0..19C9, 19D0..19D9, 19DE..19DF	80	L2/14-177		Moore, Lisa (2014-10-17), "New Tai Lue (D.2)", UTC #140 Minutes
4.1	U+1980..19A9, 19B0..19C9, 19D0..19D9, 19DE..19DF	80	L2/14-250		Moore, Lisa (2014-11-10), "Consensus 141-C26", UTC #141 Minutes, "Change New Tai Lue to be a visually ordered script..."
5.2	U+19AA..19AB	2	L2/08-395	N3538	Everson, Michael; Yu, Kanglong; Chen, Zhuang; Wei, Lin-Mei (2008-10-14), Proposal to add two characters for New Tai Lue to the BMP of the UCS
5.2	U+19AA..19AB	2	L2/08-412	N3553 (pdf, doc)	Umamaheswaran, V. S. (2008-11-05), "M53.12", Unconfirmed minutes of WG 2 meeting 53
5.2	U+19AA..19AB	2	L2/08-361		Moore, Lisa (2008-12-02), "Consensus 117-C21", UTC #117 Minutes
5.2	U+19DA	1	L2/08-036	N3380	Hosken, Martin (2008-01-24), A proposal to Encode Alternative New Tai Lue Digit 1
5.2	U+19DA	1	L2/08-318	N3453 (pdf, doc)	Umamaheswaran, V. S. (2008-08-13), "M52.20a", Unconfirmed minutes of WG 2 meeting 52
5.2	U+19DA	1	L2/08-161R2		Moore, Lisa (2008-11-05), "Consensus 115-C20", UTC #115 Minutes
5.2	U+19DA	1	L2/10-262		Freytag, Asmus (2010-07-26), Clarification of "decimal digits"
5.2	U+19DA	1	L2/10-221		Moore, Lisa (2010-08-23), "B.13.1", UTC #124 / L2 #221 Minutes
