= Arie de Jong =

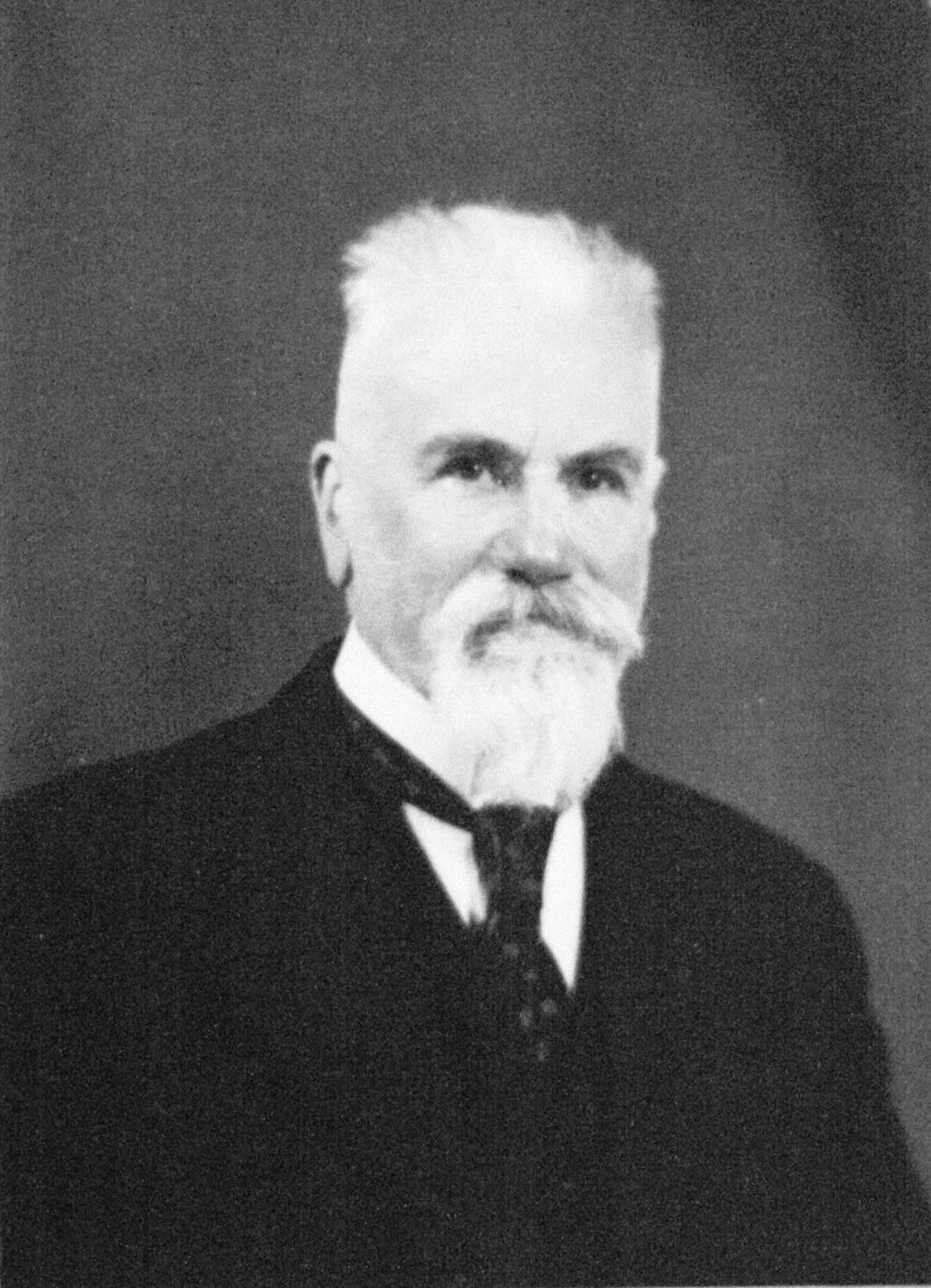
Doctor Arie de Jong

Arie de Jong (Dutch: [ˈaːri də ˈjɔŋ]; October 18, 1865, Jakarta, Dutch East Indies – October 12, 1958, Putten, Netherlands) was a Dutch enthusiast and reformer of the constructed language Volapük by Johann Martin Schleyer, with whose help the Volapük movement gained new strength in the Netherlands. He not only revised Volapük, but also (together with other Volapükist contemporaries) began Volapükaklub Valemik Nedänik (Dutch Universal Volapük Club) and founded Diläd valemik Feda Volapükaklubas. He also founded and edited Volapükagased pro Nedänapükans, an independent newspaper in Volapük, which ran for thirty-one years (1932–1963). He wrote Gramat Volapüka, a grammar of the language completely in Volapük, and a German-Volapük dictionary, Wörterbuch der Weltsprache (World Language Dictionary). He translated the New Testament into Volapük from Greek, as well as many other pieces of literature. Arie de Jong is considered the most important Volapükist of a new age of Volapük history.

== Early life and medical career ==
Arie de Jong was born on October 18, 1865, to happy parents in Batavia (now Jakarta) in then Dutch East Indies. In 1873, his family moved to Leiden, Netherlands, where he attended grammar-school (1873-1883) and studied medicine (1883-1891) at Leiden University. In February 1891, he received his Doctorate diploma; in March, he became a military medical officer (stationed in East India); briefly afterward, on September 8, he became a university medical doctor in Freiburg by means of his dissertation: "Über Diuretin" (On Diuresis).

On February 18, 1892, De Jong married Maria Elisabeth Wilhelmina Clarkson in Ginneken, and the couple left by a ship by the name of Princess Sophie after only one month, on March 22, towards Dutch East Indies. Maria, however, died aboard ship on the Red Sea, on the first day of April. Nineteen days later, Arie reached the city of Batavia alone, and on the 25th, he decided to depart to his workshop in Makassar.

In 1893, he was relocated to Bonthain (now Bantaeng in South Sulawesi); in 1896, to Padang and also to Aceh; in 1898, to Sintang, where he married for the second time, to Elise Marie Wilhelmine Gerardine Chavannes. In 1900, he became a first-class medical officer; in 1902, below he was relocated, first to Semarang and later to Ungaran; in 1904 he returned to Semarang. By that time he had already lost his two children: Marie Eugène, who was born in 1900 and died the following year, and another child who was stillborn.

In 1904 he enjoyed leisure for a year, during which he spent time in Europe. Having returned in 1905 to East Indies, he was sent to Pelantoengan, in 1908 to Yogyakarta, and in 1911 to Magelang, where for in eight years he would become a second-class medical officer. In 1912 he was relocated to Banjarmasin; the following year, he had leisure in Europe for nine months. When he returned to East Indies, he was sent to Surabaya where, at the end of 1914 he became a higher-ranked first-class medical officer. He was sent in 1915 to Malano, where his second wife, Elise Marie, died.

At that time Dutch East Indies still much needed to be organized and improved. Arie de Jong had an important role for these years in the struggle against many tropical diseases, considering that new treatments and previously denied methods appeared at the turn of the century. He helped lepers by providing certain contents for their lives, he allowed them to play instruments and made it possible for them to do simple jobs; and at this time, when these types of actions were not yet popular.

After the death of his wife in 1919, Arie de Jong returned to the Netherlands. In the following year he made The Hague his home, at the age of 54. In 1921, he married his third wife, Louise van Dissel. They had three children: Louisa Cornelia (born in 1922), Arie de Jong, Jr. (1924), and Gijsbertus Hendrienus (1926).

== Association with Volapük ==
During his studies in Leiden, De Jong came across Volapük and began to learn it. On March 20, 1891 (a week after he became a military officer), at the age of 25, he received his Volapük teacher's diploma, and after ten months, his Volapük instructor diploma. After only a year, on May 15, 1893, he became a Volapük professor (reported in the newspaper "Nuns blefik se Volapükavol" (Brief News in the World of Volapük) the following year).

During his stay in the East Indies, De Jong's interest in Volapük remained, as seen in his correspondence with various Volapükists and Volapük newspapers. On June 5, 1901, he became a Volapük academian.

== Writings ==
- 1929. Kurze Volapük-Grammatik. Revised by Arie de Jong. Confirmed by Albert Sleumer. Printed by Jakob Sprenger. Published as manuscript.
- 1931. Gramat Volapüka. First edition has been written authoritatively and with the permission of Volapük Academy by Dr. Arie de Jong. Leiden (Netherlands): Bookstore and Printer E. J. Brill.
- 1931. Wörterbuch der Weltsprache: Volapük Dictionary for Germans. 6th Edition, has been worked on by Arie de Jong. Leiden (Netherlands): Bookstore and Printer E. J. Brill.
- 1932. Leerboek der Wereldtaal. By Dr. Arie de Jong, member of Volapük Academy. Voorburg (Netherlands): Printer „Repko“.
- 1952. Aperçu de la Volapük. Gams: Sprenger. (Translated from Kurze Volapük-Grammatik into French.)
- 1952. Short grammar of Volapük. Gams: Sprenger. (Translated from Kurze Volapük-Gramatik into English.)
- 2012. Wörterbuch der Weltsprache für Deutschsprechende: Vödabuk Volapüka pro Deutänapükans. New edition of the 1931 dictionary. Cathair na Mart: Evertype, ISBN 978-1-904808-89-3
- 2012. Gramat Volapüka. New edition of the 1931 grammar. Cathair na Mart: Evertype, ISBN 978-1-904808-94-7
