= Idiom Neutral =

1902 international language

- Created by: Waldemar Rosenberger
- Date: 1902
- Setting and usage: international auxiliary language
- Users: Unknown, possibly <100
- Purpose: constructed languages: international auxiliary languages; Idiom Neutral
- Sources: developed from a heavily revised form of Volapük

Language codes
- ISO 639-3: qin (local use)
- Glottolog: None
- IETF: art-x-idiomneu

Idiom Neutral is an international auxiliary language, published in 1902 by the International Academy of the Universal Language (Akademi Internasional de Lingu Universal) under the leadership of Waldemar Rosenberger, a St. Petersburg engineer.

== History ==
The Academy had its origin as the Kadem bevünetik volapüka (literally 'International Academy of the World Language') at a congress in Munich in August 1887, was set up to conserve and perfect the auxiliary language Volapük. Under Rosenberger, who became the Academy’s director in 1892, the group began to make considerable changes in the grammar and vocabulary of Volapük, changing its nature into an entirely different language. The vocabulary was almost completely replaced by words more closely resembling those used in Western European languages, and a number of grammatical forms unfamiliar to Western Europeans were discarded. It was understood that the changes effectively resulted in the creation of a new language, which was named Idiom Neutral (which means “the neutral idiom” or “the neutral language”).

The name of the Academy was changed to Akademi Internasional de Lingu Universal in 1898 and the circulars of the Academy were written in the new language from that year. Those who continued to use Volapük re-formed the International Academy of Volapük, retaining its name (with a spelling change) as Kadäm Bevünetik Volapüka.

Dictionaries of Idiom Neutral including an outline of the grammar were published in several European languages in 1902 and 1903.

The language, sometimes referred to as “Neutral” or “the Neutral language” by English-speaking writers, created interest among international language enthusiasts at the time. Rosenberger published a periodical in the language called Progres. In 1907 Neutral was one of the projects considered by a committee of scholars which met in Paris to select an international auxiliary language (what the committee actually decided upon is disputed; see Ido and its external links for more information).

In 1908 the Akademi which had created Idiom Neutral effectively chose to abandon it in favor of Latino sine flexione, a simplified form of Latin developed by Italian mathematician Giuseppe Peano. Peano was appointed the director of the Akademi, and its name was changed to Academia pro Interlingua. Peano's language was also called Interlingua, not to be confused with the better-known Interlingua presented in 1951 by the International Auxiliary Language Association (IALA).

In 1912 Rosenberger published a reformed version of Neutral called Reform-Neutral.

== Grammar ==
The following is a rough sketch of Idiom Neutral grammar. It does not lay out every detail of grammar worked out for the language. The simple grammar of Idiom Neutral is similar to Interlingua's.

=== Writing and pronunciation ===
Idiom neutral alphabet (+ 1 digraph)
| Number | 1 | 2 | 3 | 4 | 5 | 6 | 8 | 8 | 9 | 10 | 11 | 12 | 13 | 14 | 15 | 16 | 17 | 18 | 19 | 20 | 21 | 22 | - |
|---|---|---|---|---|---|---|---|---|---|---|---|---|---|---|---|---|---|---|---|---|---|---|---|
| Upper case | A | B | C | D | E | F | G | H | I | J | K | L | M | N | O | P | R | S | T | U | V | Y | SH |
| Lower case | a | b | c | d | e | f | g | h | i | j | k | l | m | n | o | p | r | s | t | u | v | y | sh |
| IPA phonemes | a | b | t͡ʃ | d | e | f | g | h | i | ʒ | k | l | m | n | o | p | r | s | t | u | v | j | ʃ |

Twenty-two letters of the Latin script are used to write Neutral; the letters q, w, x, and z do not occur. The five vowels (a, e, i, o, u) are pronounced roughly as in Spanish. Vowels which appear next to each other are pronounced separately, not as a diphthong. The consonants have the same values as in English, except that c is pronounced like English ch in church, g is always like the g in gate, and j is pronounced as the s in measure. The combination sh is pronounced like English sh.

The stress falls on the vowel that precedes the last consonant. If no vowel precedes the last consonant (e.g. via way) the stress is on the first vowel. In a few cases the vowel at the end of a word is stressed; these vowels are marked with an acute accent (e.g. idé idea). Such accents are the only diacritics used in writing Neutral words.

=== Nouns and adjectives ===
Unlike Esperanto and Ido, nouns can end in any letter. There is no inflection for case. The plural is formed by adding the letter i at the end of the word.

Adjectives can also end in any letter. They normally appear after the nouns they modify and do not agree in number with their nouns, e.g. kaset grand big box, kaseti grand big boxes.

Comparison of adjectives (and adverbs) is with plu ... ka (more ... than), tale ... kuale (as ... as) and leplu (most, -est).

=== Verbs ===
Verbs are conjugated as follows. Examples are shown for the verb amar to love in the active voice; the endings do not change for person or number, except in the imperative.

Infinitive: amar to love
Present: mi am I love
Imperfect: mi amav I loved, I was loving
Future: mi amero I shall love
Present perfect: mi av amed I have loved
Pluperfect: mi avav amed I had loved
Future perfect: mi avero amed I shall have loved
Conditional: mi amerio I would love
Past conditional: mi averio amed I would have loved
Imperative second person singular: ama! Love!
Imperative second person plural: amate! Love!
Imperative first person plural: amam! Let's love!
Active participle: amant loving
Passive participle: amed loved

The passive voice is formed with the verb esar to be and the passive participle: mi es amed I am loved, mi averio esed amed I would have been loved, etc.

There is no inflection for a subjunctive or volitive. In expressions of desire etc., the present tense is used e.g. mi volu ke il am I want him to love; ila demandav ke vo lekt it she asked you to read it.

=== Other parts of speech ===
There is no definite or indefinite article. Adverbs can be formed from adjectives by adding e. Some prepositions are formed from other words by adding u e.g. relativu relative to from relativ relative (adj.).

== Sample texts ==
Aparati deb esar adresed a shef de stasion Peterburg e deb esar asekured per vo e per votr kont; if aparati u partii de ili esero ruined u perded in voyaj, vo deb mitar nemediate otri, plasu aparati e partii ruined u perded.

The apparatus must be addressed to the chief of the St. Petersburg station and must be insured by you and by your account; if the apparatus or parts of them are ruined or lost in the voyage, you must send others immediately in place of the apparatus and parts ruined or lost.

Publikasion de idiom neutral interesero votr filio, kel kolekt postmarki, kause ist idiom es lingu praktikal pro korespondad ko kolektatori in otr landi.

The publication of Idiom Neutral will interest your son, who collects postage stamps, because this idiom is a practical language for correspondence with collectors in other countries.
