= Brian Reynold Bishop =

British volapükologist (1934–2024)

Brian Reynold Bishop (1934 – 30 November 2024) was a British volapükologist who was the seventh Cifal (Chief) of the Volapük-speakers' community and President of the Volapük Academy.

== Life and career ==
Bishop was interested in languages since childhood. After having studied French, Spanish and Latin (he later supported the Latinitas Viva or Living Latin movement), he came into contact with constructed auxiliary languages such as Esperanto and Volapük. He started a long correspondence with Arie de Jong, the reformer of the Volapük language, and with the previous cifals Johann Schmidt and F. J. Krüger. He learned Volapük, and became a subscriber and contributor to the Volapükagased: Zänagased pro Volapükanef (Volapük Journal: Central Journal for Volapükists), where he published several of his translations. In 1979, on the occasion of the 100th anniversary of the creation of Volapük, Brian Bishop wrote to a number of newspapers and radio stations to mention the fact, which led to some attention being given to it. Encouraged by the ensuing interest, he created the Zänabür Volapüka (Volapük Central Office), where he collected many Volapük memorabilia (mostly from F. J. Krüger's collection). In 1981, he became vice-Cifal (via an edict by Cifal Krüger dated 13 October 1981), and two years later he became Cifal (via an edict by Cifal Krüger dated 1 January 1984).

He was involved in the reorganization of the Kadäm Volapüka (Academy of Volapük) and of the Volapük Movement, for which he published new statutes. Its first official activities started in 2007. He was also a participant in the Volapük discussion group, which unites most living Volapükists.

Bishop died on 30 November 2024.
