= Volapük =

Constructed international auxiliary language

- Volapük, Volapꞟk, Volapük nulik
- Logo of the Volapük movement (2nd phase)
- Created by: Johann Martin Schleyer
- Date: 1879–1880 (Classical Volapük), 1931 (Reformed Volapük)
- Setting and usage: International: mostly in Europe
- Users: (20 cited 2000)
- Purpose: Constructed language: International auxiliary language; Volapük
- Writing system: Latin
- Sources: Mostly influenced by Germanic languages, particularly English and German, with some influence from Romance languages and Russian

Official status
- Regulated by: Kadäm Volapüka

Language codes
- ISO 639-1: vo
- ISO 639-2: vol
- ISO 639-3: vol
- Glottolog: vola1234
- IETF: vo-rigik (original) vo-nulik (modern)

Volapük (English: /ˈvɒləpʊk/; Volapük: [volaˈpyk], 'Language of the World', or lit. 'World Speak') is a constructed language created in 1879 and 1880 by Johann Martin Schleyer, a Roman Catholic priest in Baden, Germany. Notable as the first major constructed international auxiliary language, it primarily drew from Germanic languages. Its grammar is inspired largely by German, although it was heavily regularized by Schleyer, while its lexicon is rooted mostly in English, with additional influence from German, the Romance languages, and Russian. Despite some roots remaining recognizable, many words were altered beyond recognition, as Schleyer sought to make most of the vocabulary monosyllabic.

Volapük conventions took place in 1884 (Friedrichshafen), 1887 (Munich) and 1889 (Paris). The first two conventions used German, and the last conference used only Volapük. By 1889, there were an estimated 283 clubs, 25 periodicals in or about Volapük, and 316 textbooks in 25 languages; at that time the language claimed nearly a million adherents. Volapük experienced a small revival in the 1930s due to Arie de Jong's reforms of the language, which became called Volapük nulik. This form simplified the language and became the commonly accepted form of it. Volapük was largely displaced between the late 19th and early 20th century by Esperanto, as many Volapükists switched to Esperanto due to the internal conflicts within the Volapükist movement.

Volapük still maintains a small userbase to this day, and it has seen a small revival in the 21st century.

== History ==
Volapük was first created by Johann Martin Schleyer, who was a Roman Catholic priest. As Schleyer met an old German peasant who could not write to his son due to the linguistic barrier, he was very sympathetic, causing him to decide that there should be a means of international communication. He first created a "National alphabet", which could express the sounds of every language in the world. However, his alphabet system did not gain any recognition, which caused him to develop insomnia. During one sleepless night, he believed that God told him not to despair, and had called him to create an international auxiliary language. Schleyer first published a sketch of Volapük in May 1879 in Sionsharfe, a Catholic poetry magazine of which he was editor. This was followed in 1880 by a full-length book in German. Schleyer himself did not write books on Volapük in other languages, but other authors soon did, such as Comprehensive Volapük Grammar by Alfred A. Post, A Complete Grammar of Volapük by A. K. Linderfelt, and A Handbook of Volapük by Andrew Drummond.

André Cherpillod writes of the third Volapük convention,

In August 1889 the third convention was held in Paris. About two hundred people from many countries attended. And, unlike in the first two conventions, people spoke only Volapük. For the first time in the history of mankind, sixteen years before the Boulogne convention, an international convention spoke an international language.

Volapük experienced a short period of very high success, spreading first to France, and then elsewhere. At one point there were perhaps up to even one million students of Volapük, but later began to decline.

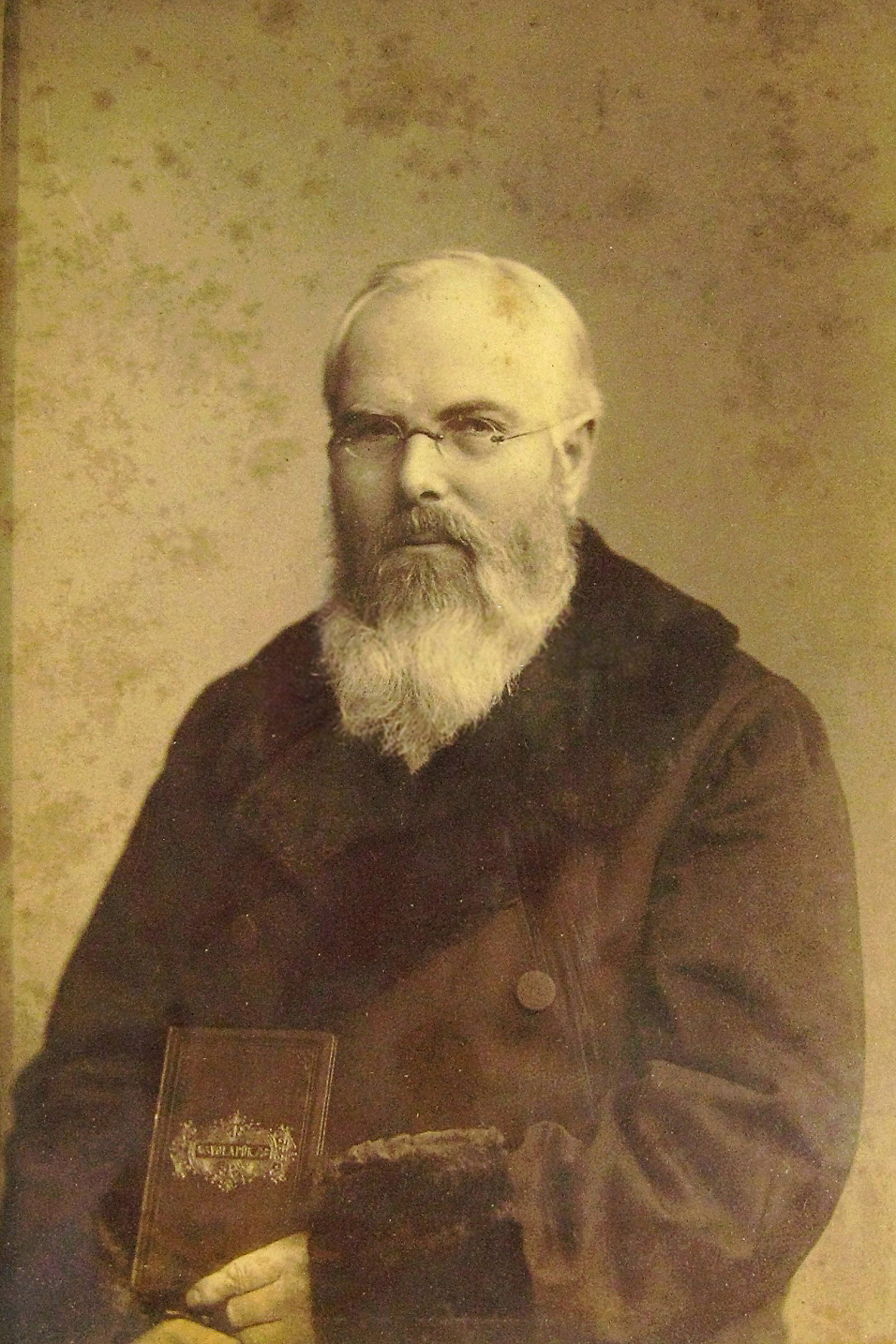
Johann Martin Schleyer, the creator of Volapük

=== Decline and absorption by Esperanto ===
The Dutch cryptographer Auguste Kerckhoffs was for a number of years director of the Academy of Volapük, and introduced the movement to several countries. The French Association for the Propagation of Volapük was authorized on 8 April 1886, with A. Lourdelet as president and a central committee that included the deputy Edgar Raoul-Duval. However, tensions arose between Kerckhoffs and others in the Academy, who wanted reforms made to the language, and Schleyer, who insisted strongly on retaining his proprietary rights. This led to schism, with much of the Academy abandoning Schleyer's Volapük in favor of Idiom Neutral and other new constructed language projects. Another reason for the decline of Volapük may have been the rise of Esperanto. By 1890 the movement was in disarray, with violent arguments among the members. Schleyer resigned from the Volapük Academy and created a rival academy. Derived languages such as Nal Bino, Balta, Bopal, Spelin, Dil and Orba were invented and quickly forgotten.

In 1887 the first Esperanto book (Unua Libro) was published. The internal collapse of the Volapük movement led to its gradual replacement by Esperanto, as many of its speakers joined the Esperanto movement which was linguistically simpler, and lacked central control, causing many previous Volapük clubs to be converted into Esperanto clubs. The influence of Volapük was thus a major driver of the initial Esperanto movement, as it set the stage for the widespread usage of constructed languages, though its own usage declined radically.

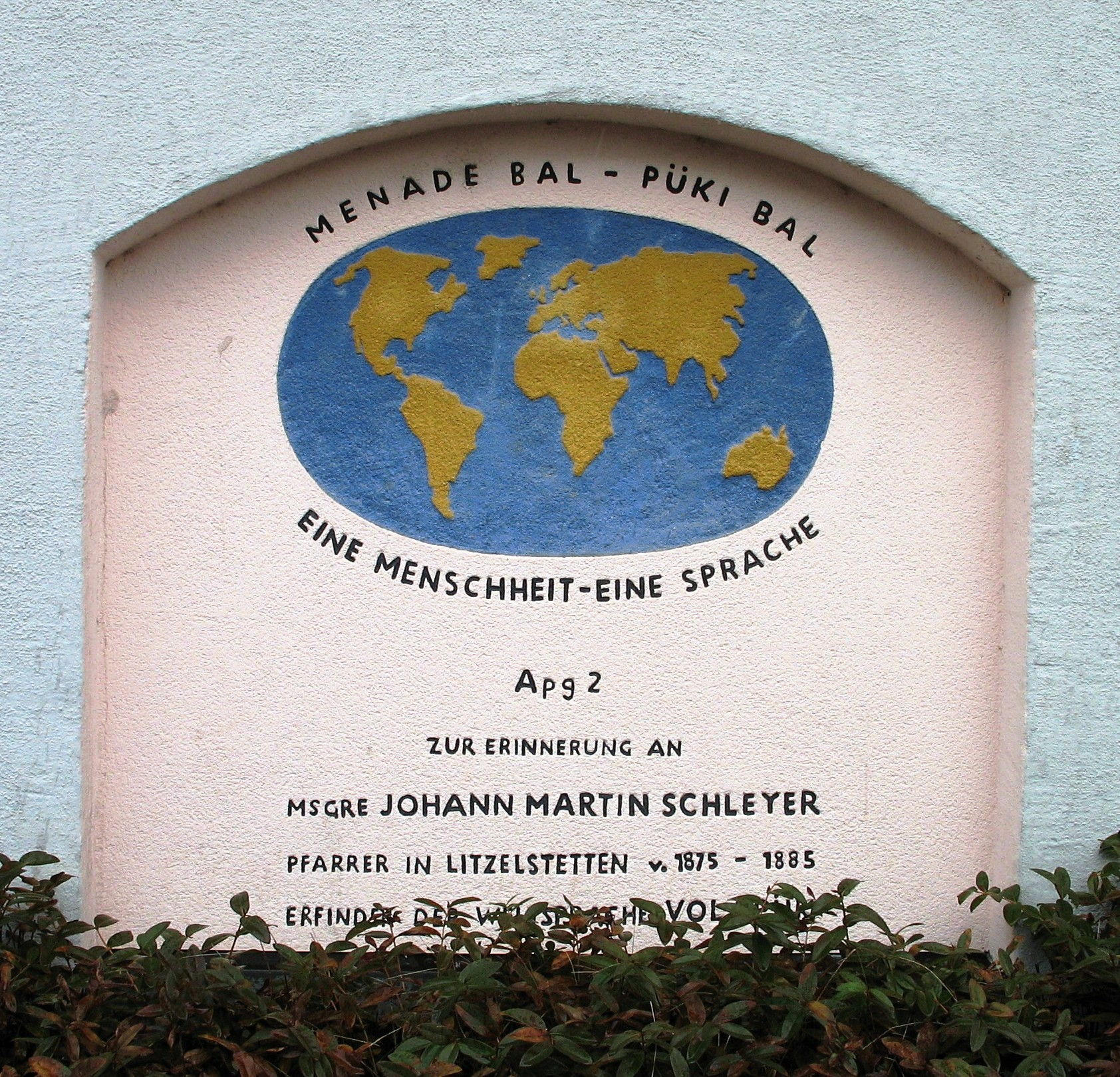
Commemorative inscription for J. M. Schleyer on the wall of the parsonage in Litzelstetten, Konstanz, written in Volapük and German: Menade bal – püki bal Eine Menschheit – eine Sprache (One mankind – one language)

=== 20th century temporary revival ===
In the 1920s, Arie de Jong, with the consent of the leaders of the small remnant of Volapük speakers, made a revision of Volapük which was published in 1931 (now called Volapük Nulik "New Volapük" as opposed to the Volapük Rigik 'Original Volapük' of Schleyer). This revision was accepted by the few speakers of the language. De Jong simplified the grammar, eliminating some rarely used verb forms, and eliminated some gendered pronouns and gendered verb endings. He also rehabilitated the phoneme /r/ and used it to make some morphemes more recognizable. For instance, lömib "rain" became rein. These reforms made the language simpler overall. Volapük enjoyed a brief renewal of popularity in the Netherlands and Germany under de Jong's leadership, but was suppressed (along with other constructed languages) in countries under Nazi rule and never recovered.

Regarding the success of this constructed language, the Spanish scientist Santiago Ramón y Cajal wrote in the first edition of his Tonics of Willingness, in 1898:

Nowadays, many scientific papers are published in more than six languages. To the likely attempt of restoring Latin or using Esperanto as the universal language of science, wise men have responded by multiplying the number of languages in which scientific works are published. We have to acknowledge that Volapük or Esperanto are practically one more language to be learnt. This result was predictable because neither the essentially popularized and democratic tendencies of modern knowledge, nor the economic views of authors and editors consent in a different way.

However, some years later (1920), in the third edition of the same book, he added the following footnote to the former assertion: "As it was presumable, nowadays -1920-, the brand new Volapük has been forgotten definitively. We forecast the same for Esperanto."

=== Modern-day use and resurgence ===
Unofficial flag of Volapük

Volapük has experienced a small revival in the 21st century, although often as a hobby language. Large Volapük collections are held by the International Esperanto Museum in Vienna, Austria; the Center for Documentation and Study about the International Language in La Chaux-de-Fonds, Switzerland; and the American Philosophical Society in Philadelphia, Pennsylvania. In 2000 there were an estimated 20 Volapük speakers in the world.

In December 2007 it was reported that the Volapük version of Wikipedia had recently jumped to 15th place among language editions, with more than 112,000 articles. A few months earlier there had been only 797 articles. The massive increase in the size of "Vükiped", bringing it ahead of the Esperanto Wikipedia, was due to an enthusiast who had used a computer program to automatically create geographical articles, many on small villages. The motive was to gain visibility for the language. By March 2013 the Esperanto Wikipedia, with a very active user community, had risen to 176,792 articles, while the Volapük Wikipedia had at that point 119,091 articles. In 2013 and 2014, the Volapük Wikipedia was presented as evidence that the internet is helping revive the Volapük movement, albeit merely as a hobby, devoid of its former internationalist aim. As one of the largest works written in the language over the last century, it has an impact on the development of modern Volapük neologisms, particularly geographical terms.

There has been a continuous Volapük speaker community since Schleyer's time, with an unbroken succession of Cifals (leaders). These were:

1. Johann Martin Schleyer 1879–1912
2. Albert Sleumer 1912–1948
3. Arie de Jong (provisionally) 1947–1948, 1951–1957
4. Jakob Sprenger 1948–1950
5. Johann Schmidt 1950–1977
6. Johann Krüger 1977–1983
7. Brian Bishop 1984–2014
8. Hermann Philipps 2014–present

== Phonology and orthography ==
Schleyer proposed alternative forms for the umlaut vowels, but they were rarely used.

The phonology of Volapük is as follows:

Vowels
	Front		Back
	Unrounded	Rounded	Back
Close	i	y ⟨ü (ꞟ)⟩	u
Close-mid	e	ø ⟨ö (ꞝ)⟩	o ~ ɔ ⟨o⟩
Open-mid	ɛ ~ æ ⟨ä (ꞛ)⟩		o ~ ɔ ⟨o⟩
Near-open	ɛ ~ æ ⟨ä (ꞛ)⟩		
Open	a ~ ɑ ⟨a⟩		

Consonants
		Bilabial	Alveolar	Postalveolar	Palatal	Velar	Glottal
Nasal		m	n				
Plosive	Voiced	b	d			ɡ	
Plosive	Voiceless	p	t			k	
Affricate	Voiced		t͡s ~ d͡z ⟨z⟩	t͡ʃ ~ d͡ʒ ⟨c⟩			
Affricate	Voiceless		t͡s ~ d͡z ⟨z⟩	t͡ʃ ~ d͡ʒ ⟨c⟩			
Fricative	Voiced	v	s ~ z ⟨s⟩	ʃ ~ ʒ ⟨j⟩			
Fricative	Voiceless	f	s ~ z ⟨s⟩	ʃ ~ ʒ ⟨j⟩			h
Approximant		w (Note: W and R were not included in the original version of Volpük.)	l		j ⟨y⟩		
Trill			r				

Additionally, ⟨x⟩ represents the sequence /ks/. The letters ⟨C⟩, ⟨J⟩, ⟨S⟩ and ⟨Z⟩ are pronounced voiced after voiced consonants and unvoiced otherwise.

There are no diphthongs; each vowel letter is pronounced separately. Polysyllabic words are always stressed on the final vowel; for example, neai "never" is pronounced [ne.a.ˈi]. Exceptionally, the question clitic "-li" does not shift the stress of the word it attaches to. When words are compounded together, secondary stress is retained on the final syllables of the compounded elements, as long as that does not result in adjacent stressed syllables.

The letters ä, ö, and ü do not have alternative forms such as the ae, oe, and ue of German, but Schleyer proposed alternative forms ꞛ, ꞝ, and ꞟ for them, all of which are part of Unicode since version 7.0 released in June 2014:

- U+A79A Ꞛ LATIN CAPITAL LETTER VOLAPUK AE
- U+A79B ꞛ LATIN SMALL LETTER VOLAPUK AE
- U+A79C Ꞝ LATIN CAPITAL LETTER VOLAPUK OE
- U+A79D ꞝ LATIN SMALL LETTER VOLAPUK OE
- U+A79E Ꞟ LATIN CAPITAL LETTER VOLAPUK UE
- U+A79F ꞟ LATIN SMALL LETTER VOLAPUK UE

=== Special consonantal letters ===
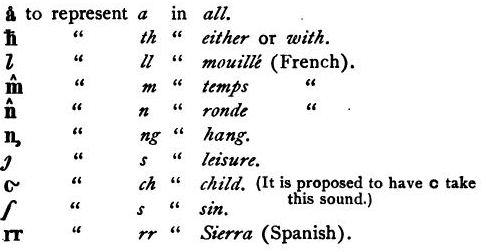
The author Alfred A. Post mentions in his Comprehensive Volapük Grammar some additional letters created by Schleyer.

The following letters were constructed by the inventor to designate sounds which occasionally occur: (Note: These letters were most likely used for contractions and/or a better letter–phoneme correspondence in very rare loanwords from languages like French and Spanish.)

Grapheme	Representing	IPA
å	English ⟨a⟩ in all	ɔː ~ ɒ
ħ	English voiced ⟨th⟩	ð
𝑙	French ⟨ll⟩ after ⟨i⟩	j
m̂	French assimilated ⟨m⟩	Vm > Ṽ
n̂	French assimilated ⟨n⟩	Vn > Ṽ
ᶇ	English ⟨ng⟩	ŋ
ȷ	English ⟨s⟩ in leisure	ʒ
ƈ	English ⟨ch⟩	t͡ʃ
ſ	English ⟨s⟩	s
rr	Spanish ⟨rr⟩	r

== Linguistic features ==
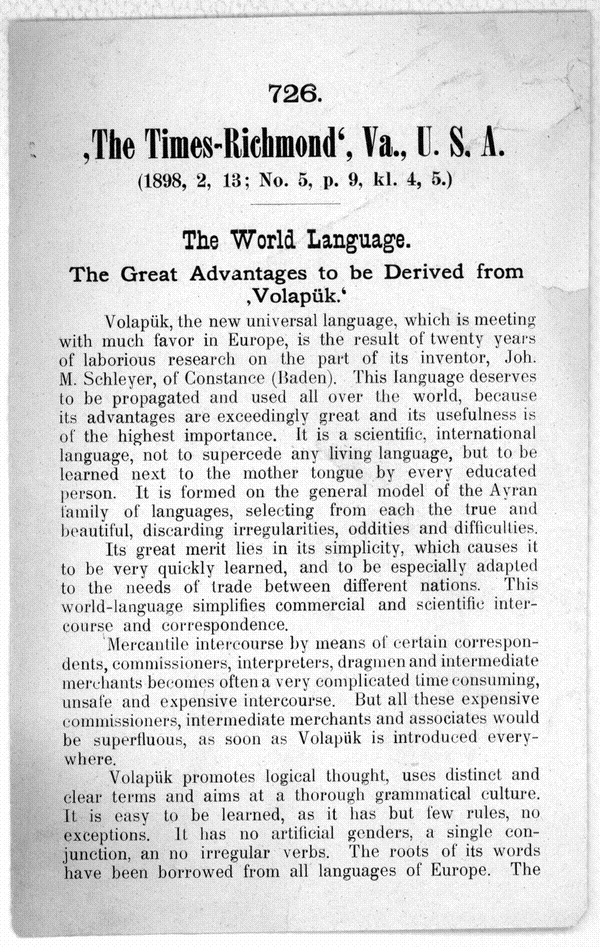
1898 broadsheet advertising Volapük

Schleyer adapted the vocabulary mostly from English, with a smattering of German, Italian, Spanish, Russian and French. Some words remain readily recognizable for a speaker of one of the source languages, but many others are modified beyond easy recognition, as Schleyer wanted to keep most vocabulary monosyllabic. For instance, vol and pük are derived from the English words world and speak. Although unimportant linguistically, and regardless of the simplicity and consistency of the stress rule, these deformations were greatly mocked by the language's detractors. It seems to have been Schleyer's intention, however, to alter its loan words in such a way that they would be hard to recognise, thus losing their ties to the languages (and, by extension, nations) from which they came. Conversely, Esperanto and Interlingua are commonly criticized as being much easier to learn for Europeans than for those with non-European native languages. However, during the reforms of the language in the 1930s, some of the vocabulary was made more recognizable, particularly with the introduction of the letter r, thus words such as lilöm (rain) and lilädön (to read) became rein and reidön. This also made international words such as dolar (dollar) easier to recognize.

Grammatically, Volapük was highly influenced particularly by German, although it gets rid of the irregular features of German grammar. The reforms of Volapük also however simplified its grammar, and removing grammatical features such as the aorist.

== Grammar ==
The grammar is based on that of typical European languages, but with an agglutinative character: grammatical inflections are indicated by stringing together separate affixes for each element of meaning.

=== Nouns ===
Nouns inflect for case and number, but not for gender.

The following is the declension of the Volapük word vol "world":

Case	Singular	Plural
Nominative	vol (world)	vols (worlds)
Genitive	vola (of the world)	volas (of the worlds)
Dative	vole (to the world)	voles (to the worlds)
Accusative	voli (world)	volis (worlds)

As in German, the Volapük noun has four cases: nominative, genitive, dative and accusative. In compound words, the first part of the compound is usually separated from the second by the genitive termination -a, e.g. Vola-pük, "of-world language": "the world's language" or "language of the world". However, the other case endings (-e dative, -i accusative) are sometimes used if applicable, or the roots may be agglutinated in the nominative, with no separating vowel.

=== Adjectives and adverbs ===
Adjectives, formed by the suffix -ik, normally follow the noun they qualify. They do not agree with the noun in number and case in that position, but they do if they precede the noun, are separated from it by intervening words, or stand alone. Adverbs are formed by suffixing -o, either to the root or to the adjectival -ik (gudik "good", gudiko "well"); they normally follow the verb or adjective they modify.

=== Pronouns ===
The pronouns begin with o-. In the singular, they are ob "I", ol "thou", om "he/it", of "she", os (impersonal), on "one", ok "oneself". They are pluralized with -s: obs "we", ols "ye", oms "they". The possessive may be formed with either the genitive -a or with adjectival -ik: oba or obik "my". Prepositions, conjunctions and interjections are also formed from noun roots by appending appropriate suffixes. In later, reformed Volapük, om was narrowed down to males only, whereas on got the meaning of 'it' as well as impersonal 'they'.

=== Verbs ===
The verb carries a fine degree of detail, with morphemes marking tense, aspect, voice, person, number and (in the third person) the subject's gender. However, many of these categories are optional, and a verb can stand in an unmarked state. A Volapük verb can be conjugated in 1,584 ways (including infinitives and reflexives).

Person

For the simple present, the pronouns are suffixed to the verb stem:

binob I am, binol thou art,

etc. The present passive takes the prefix pa-:

palöfons they are loved.

Tense, aspect, and voice

The three tenses in the indicative, and the three perfect aspects, each take a characteristic vowel prefix:

Tense	Prefix
Past	ä-
Past perfect	i-
Present	a-
Present perfect	e-
Future	o-
Future perfect	u-

The present-tense prefix is omitted in the active voice, so:

binob I am, äbinol you were, ebinom he has been, ibinof she had been, obinos it will be, ubinon one will have been.

These are seen as being more distant from the present tense the further the vowel is from [a] in vowel space, and they can be used with temporal words to indicate distance in the past or future. For example, from del 'day',

adelo today, odelo tomorrow, udelo the day after tomorrow, ädelo yesterday, edelo the day before yesterday, idelo three days ago.

The passive voice is formed with p-, and here the a is required for the present tense:

palöfob I am loved, pälogol you were seen, pologobs we will be seen.

Infinitive mood

The infinitive is formed with the suffix -ön. It can be combined with tense/aspect prefixes:

Logön to see, elogön to have seen.

Interrogative mood

Yes–no questions are indicated with the particle li:

Pälogom-li was he seen?

The hyphen indicates that the syllable li does not take stress. It occurs before the verb to avoid a sequence of three consonants or a double el: li-pälogol? li-binoms?

Participles and the habitual aspect

Participles, both active and passive, are formed with -öl:

Logöl seeing, elogöl having seen, ologöl being about to see, palogöl seen (being seen), pelogöl seen (having been seen), pologöl about to be seen.

Binob penöl is literally 'I am writing', though penob is also used. For "I write" as habitual action, the habitual aspect is used. This is formed by adding -i- after the tense prefix, and here again the present-tense a- is required. The forms are thus active ai-, äi-, ei-, ii-, oi-, ui-, passive pai-, päi-, pei-, pii-, poi-, pui-. All are pronounced as two syllables.

Aifidob bodi I eat bread (as a daily occurrence), äipenob penedis I used to write letters.

With temporal words,

aidelo daily (at the present time)

Imperative mood

The imperative -öd follows the subject suffix:

Gololöd! Go! (to one person), gololsöd! go! (to more than one person)

Optative -ös is used for courteous requests, and jussive -öz an emphatic command.

Conditional mood

Conditionals are formed with -la for the protasis (if-clause) and -öv for the apodosis (then-clause):

If äbinob-la liegik, äbinoböv givik – if I were rich I would be generous.
Ibinomöv givik, if ibinom-la liegik – he would have been generous if he had been rich.

Note that the tense changes as well, so that in the first example the past tense is used even though the present tense is intended. Like the question particle, the -la is written with a hyphen to indicate that it is not stressed in speech.

Potential mood

A potential mood is formed with -öx:

Pelomöx he might pay.

Reflexive verbs

Reflexive forms are made from the active voice and the pronoun ok:

Vatükob I wash, vatükobok (or vatükob obi) I wash myself.

In the third person, the periphrastic form of vatükomok (he washes himself) must use the reflexive pronoun, vatükom oki, as vatükom omi would mean "he washes him (someone else)".

The plural -s may precede or follow the reflexive, as the speaker chooses:

vatükomoks or vatükomsok they wash themselves.

Here there is a meaningful distinction between joining the pronoun to the verb, and inflecting it independently:

Löfobsok we love ourselves, löfobs obis we love each other.

Gerundive

The attributive affixes are active voice ö- and passive voice pö-.

== Examples ==
=== The Lord's Prayer ===
1880 Schleyer Volapük	1930 de Jong Volapük
O Fat obas, kel binol in süls,	O Fat obas, kel binol in süls!
paisaludomöz nem ola!	Nem olik pasalüdükonöd!
Kömomöd monargän ola!	Regän ola kömonöd!
Jenomöz vil olik, äs in sül, i su tal!	Vil olik jenonöd, äsä in sül, i su tal!
Bodi obsik vädeliki givolös obes adelo!	Givolös obes adelo bodi aldelik obsik!
E pardolös obes debis obsik,	E pardolös obes döbotis obsik,
äs id obs aipardobs debeles obas.	äsä i obs pardobs utanes, kels edöbons kol obs.
E no obis nindukolös in tendadi;	E no blufodolös obis,
sod aidalivolös obis de bad.	ab livükolös obis de bad!
	(Ibä dutons lü ol regän, e nämäd e glor jü ün laidüp.)
Jenosöd!	So binosös!

== Usage as common noun ==
The word Volapük or a variation thereof means "nonsense, gibberish" in certain languages, such as Danish volapyk and Esperanto volapukaĵo.

== See also ==
- Kosmopolan
- Volapükologist
- Volapük Wikipedia
- Esperanto
- Ido
- Interlingua
- International Volapük Academy
