= Johann Martin Schleyer =

German Catholic priest (1831–1912)

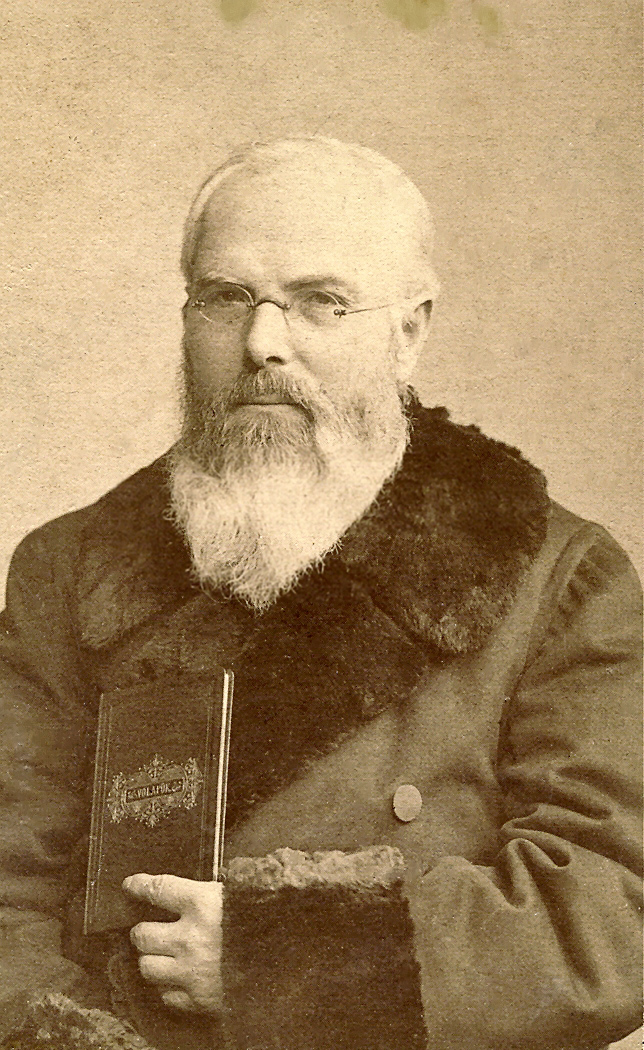
- Schleyer in 1908
- Born: Martin Schleyer; 18 July 1831; Oberlauda, Grand Duchy of Baden
- Died: 16 August 1912 (aged 81); Konstanz, German Empire
- Occupation: Catholic priest
- Known for: Volapük

Johann Martin Schleyer (German pronunciation: [ˈjoːhan ˈmaʁtiːn ˈʃlaɪɐ]; 18 July 1831 – 16 August 1912) was a German Catholic priest who invented the constructed language Volapük. His official name was "Martin Schleyer"; he added the name "Johann" (in honor of his godfather) unofficially.

== Life and work ==
Schleyer was born in Oberlauda (Baden). According to his own report, the idea of an international language arose out of a conversation he had with one of his parishioners, a semi-literate German peasant whose son had emigrated to America and could no longer be reached by mail because the United States Postal Service could not read the father's handwriting.

He was ordained in 1856. From 1867 to 1875, Schleyer served as pastor at Krumbach near Meßkirch. At the end of this time he was jailed for four months for preaching against socialism during the Kulturkampf.

From 1875 to 1885 he was pastor of Ss. Peter and Paul parish in Litzelstetten. He later wrote that the first seven years in Litzelstetten were among the happiest of his life.

At this time he was editor of the magazine Sionsharfe, devoted mainly to Catholic poetry. In May 1879 he published an article on Volapük in this magazine. This sketch was followed by a full-length book in 1880. The language spread widely and new clubs sprung up all over Europe. After 1885 Schleyer had to retire from his pastoral duties due to ill health, though he was still involved in the Volapük movement until it fell apart a few years later.

In 1894 Pope Leo XIII made him a papal prelate.

Schleyer died in Konstanz in 1912.

== Remembrance ==
A campaign to beatify him was started in June 2001, based in his home parish of Litzelstetten. The high school Martin-Schleyer-Gymnasium Lauda-Königshofen in Lauda is named for him.

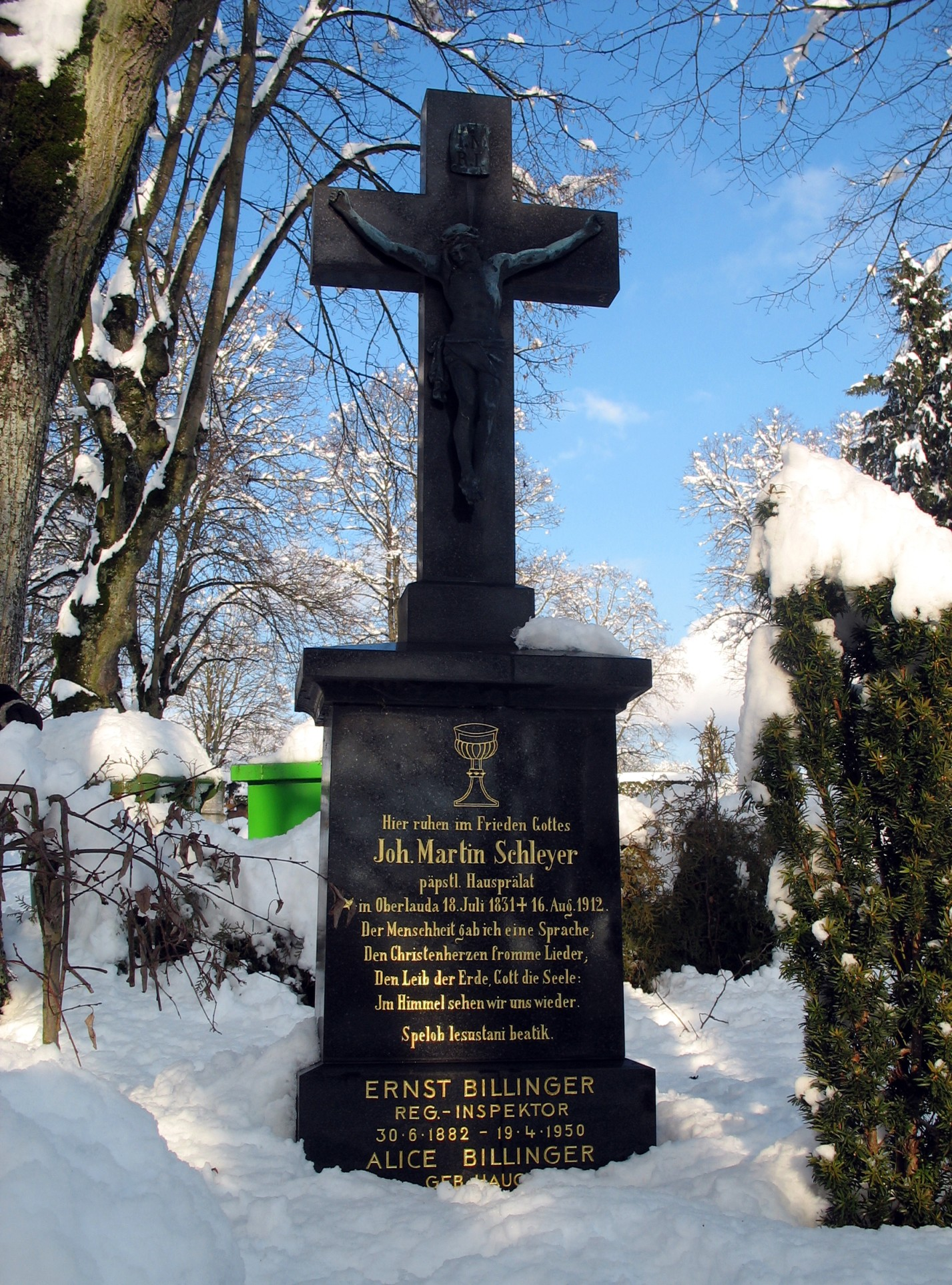
Grave of Johann Martin Schleyer, Main cemetery of Konstanz, Germany

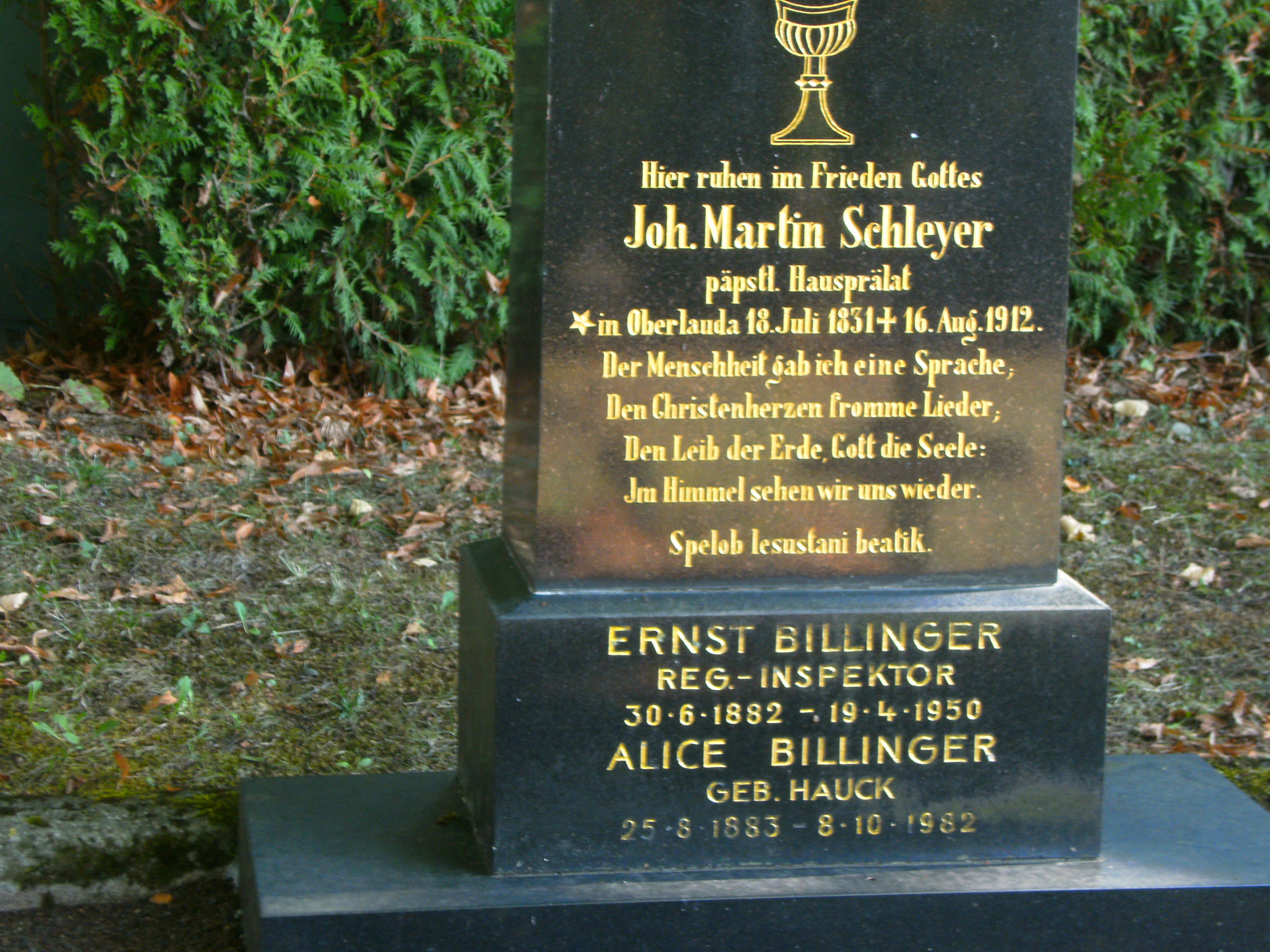
Hauptfriedhof Konstanz, Germany (main cemetery), Riesenbergweg. Grave of Johann Martin Schleyer, inscription. Area 12, Row 11 in the north eastern part of the cemetery.
