= Quartiere Varesina =

- Quartiere of Milan
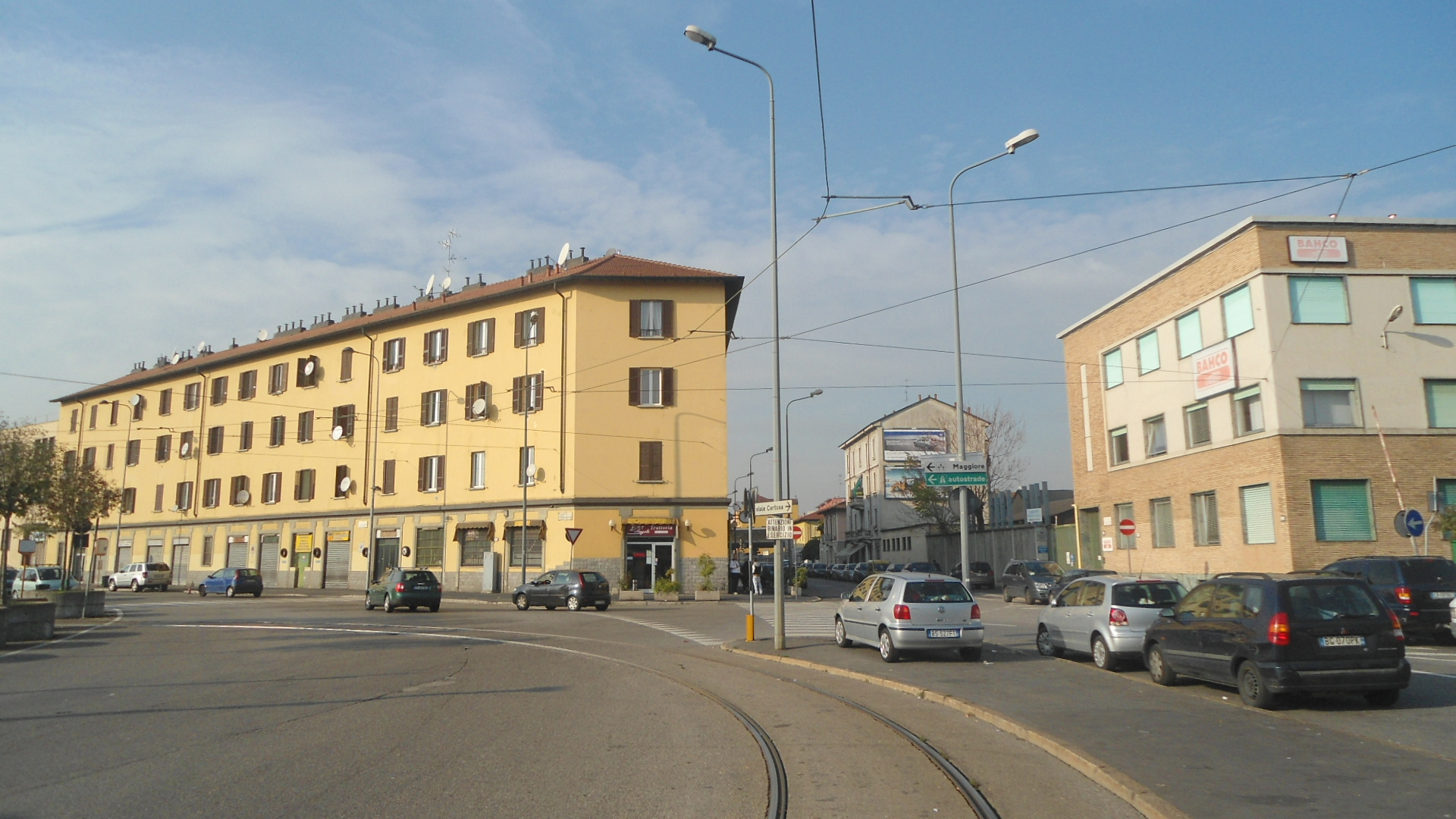
- Interactive map of Quartiere Varesina
- Coordinates: 45°29′44.08″N 9°8′57.3″E
- Country: Italy
- Region: Lombardy
- Province: Milan
- Comune: Milan
- Zone: 8
- Time zone: UTC+1 (CET)
  - Summer (DST): UTC+2 (CEST)

Quartiere Varesina is a small district, quartiere, of Milan, located in the suburban north-west part of the city. It belongs on the Zone 8 administrative division of the city.

Its name derived from Strada della Varesina, meaning Road for Varese, the pre-alpine city 50 km. at north of Milan.

== Characteristics ==
Quartiere Varesina is a highly urbanized district located to east of Via Varesina, having Viale Espinasse as central axis that extends from Piazzale Accursio up to the Svincolo of Viale Certosa. The district does not have a definite urban plan, developed as the industrial outskirts of the city, with few green spaces created. The industrial part of the neighborhood is changing even in the 21st century..

The quarter's name is derived from an ancient road, Strada della Varesina, now less important than in the past when it was the only road from Milan towards Varese, even if, the name, Via Varesina, remained. Furthermore, Via Varesina is the demarcation of a side of the neighborhood and not its axis. The neighborhood for his difference is often indicated with the name of one of its streets, Espinasse, or with known locations or areas that are located in its vicinity, Certosa, Highway for Lakes, Viale Certosa, Musocco, Garegnano or pairs of names Varesina-Espinasse, Certosa-Musocco and so on.

A bit of numbers:

- Via Varesina measures 1.7 km.
- the stretch of Viale Certosa belonging to the district, between Piazzale Accursio and Svincolo Viale Certosa, is 1.4 km. long
- The border with Svincolo Viale Certosa between Viale Certosa and railway 900 m.

From the quarter you are accessing strategic areas:

- city center is not longer than 6 km., reachable from one big street Viale Certosa
- to north at Turin-Milan railway: Quarto Oggiaro, Vialba, even the Expo 2015 area is only 2 km. far
- highway for Lakes (Lake Como and Lake Maggiore) and Autostrada A4 (Italy) Turin - Venice ends in the district.
- Cimitero Maggiore di Milano is fifteen minutes of walking

== History ==
=== Border to the city ===
Quartiere Varesina occupies part of the surface of the Musocco municipality abolished in 1923 which began from Strada della Varesina and bordered to Milan along Cagnola. The boundary of the district to the city is similar to that subdivision, despite the transformations that have occurred, indicated as Piazzale Accursio perimeter and the adjacent streets connecting to the beginning of Via Varesina.

=== Three new main roads ===
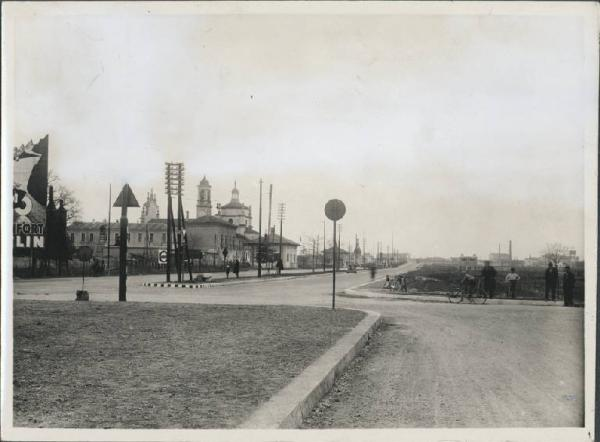
The driveway for Lakes Highway in 1930.

The district is delimited in the second half of the nineteenth century by Strada della Varesina and with the construction of three great ways that change the geography, clearly separating the old centers:

- Turin–Milan railway around 1860
- Viale Certosa going from the city to Greater Cemetery of Milan at the end of 1800s
- the driveway to Lakes Highway, separating Garegnano's borgo from its preeminent church, Certosa di Garegnano built in 1300.

The new driveway for Lakes Highway, bisects Garegnano, leaving the Certosa di Garegnano on one side and the village of houses on the other. In fact, the old village of Garegnano, Garegnano Marcido, in the new geography then becomes part of Quartiere Varesina. This division between the two areas is even more clear with the construction of the flyover del Ghisallo in 1960.

Quartiere Varesina encompasses, at the time of the dissolution of Musocco municipality, Garegnano Marcido village, the houses along Strada della Varesina from Cagnola to the railway, the historic core around the current Piazzale Santorre of Santarosa, up to the driveway of the newly inaugurated Lakes Highway, becoming an industrial suburb of Milan.

=== Analysis of the area ===
In the development of the area between these main roads, you can find a division at the height of Piazzale Santorre di Santarosa:

- the south with:
  - Viale Carlo Espinasse, parallel street of Via Varesina, as the major axis south–north
  - develops mainly for residential use being closer to the city center
  - Viale Espinasse highly populated
  - proximity to the area indicated as Cagnola
  - reference church: Saint Marcelina and Saint Joseph, Viale Espinasse, 85
- the north with features:
  - Via Barnaba Oriani as the major axis east–west, ancient connection between Strada della Varesina and Certosa di Garegnano
  - undergoes a predominantly industrial development being proximity to the exit from Milan
  - Viale Espinasse uninhabited
  - vicinity to Milano Certosa railway station
  - reference church: Certosa di Garegnano

Via Ludovico di Breme built in the early nineteens can be considered as a dividing line between these two areas.

== Center of the district ==
The center of the neighborhood can be considered Piazzale Santorre di Santarosa which is the junction of the district and the nearby church of Viale Espinasse, 85.

A church dedicated to Saint Marcellina and Saint Joseph, commissioned in 1958 by Cardinal Montini. It was consecrated to St. Marcellina by Cardinal Carlo Maria Martini, Archbishop of Milan, December 9, 1983 and then also dedicated to St. Joseph, to which was added the suffix to the Certosa, with clear reference to the nearby Certosa di Garegnano. The square in front of it was used for parking until the end of the 1990s, when the surrounding area became a garden and a recreational point with an attached oratory, football field and locker room.

Shops cluster around Viale Espinasse, noted by a tramway, currently with 19 line. The old shops are now extinct, remain bar, call centers, real estate agencies, ethnic clubs, hairdressers, a hotel, a pharmacy, a bank and the shopping center Billa.

== Prominent buildings ==
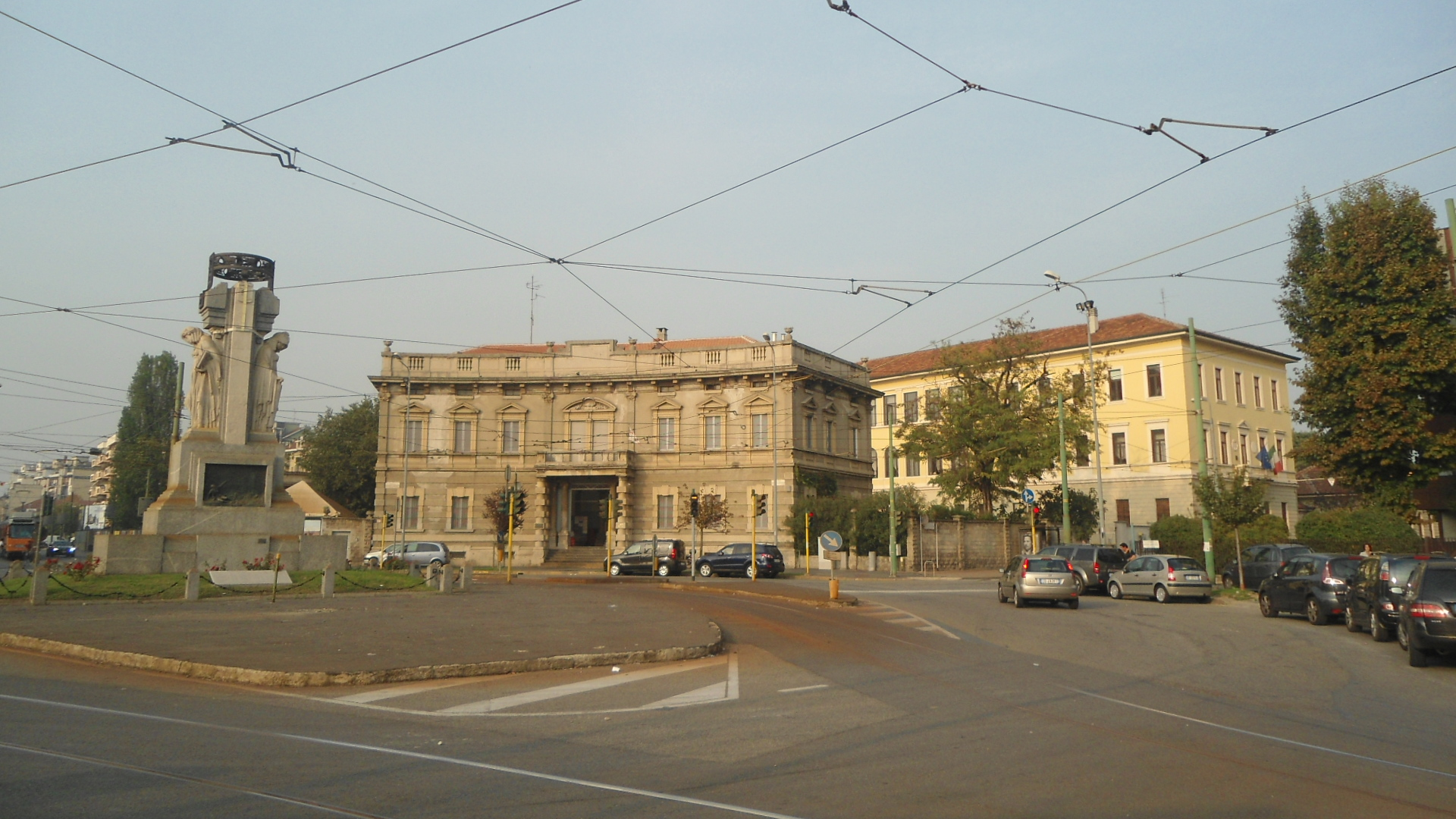
Piazzale Santorre di Santarosa

In Piazzale Santorre di Santarosa we find:

- the old seat of the municipality of Musocco, at No. 10, became in time even Casa del Fascio and now Green Cross Sempione home
- the War Memorial of Musocco inaugurated in 1924 with the names of the fallen of the municipality during the First World War and restored in 2008.

Few meters further at Via De Rossi, 2 there is the primary school Alfredo Cappellini.

In Viale Espinasse, corner Viale Certosa, in 1951 was built the service station Agip, designed by the architect Mario Bacciocchi, which still exists but only partially used. The structure of the station, which combines the right angle of the two boulevards, looks like a ship that rises from the road surface, giving a sense of dynamism and plasticity, a work considered to be of architectural merit.

== 20th century ==
The history and growth of the district is related to its position as a crossroads for the North-West of the province and the region to Novara, Varese, Como and its distance from the center of Milan, about 6–7 km.

=== Housing ===
The part of the district along the axis of Viale Espinasse up to Piazzale di Santorre Santarosa is rapidly built for residential use from the 30s. The passage of the tram along the way, if on the one hand contributes to the noise, on the other gives rise to shops and stores for the visibility of the road. In the streets that intersect it, Via Marcantonio dal Re, Via Casella, Via Mola, Via Nuvolone, arise a mixture of small businesses, buildings, small houses still partly standing. Engine of development of the area is also nearby, just a few hundred meters, automobile factory Alfa Romeo at Portello which employs thousands of workers, reducing activity from the 60s onwards, until the end of the 80s. Over time, small companies in the area gradually give way to new homes, meanwhile shops and stores are anyway replaced by new businesses, such as Standa opened a shopping center, Fiat and Opel a dealership. At the end of the 90s is completely redone the road surface, uneven for years for the passage of trams.

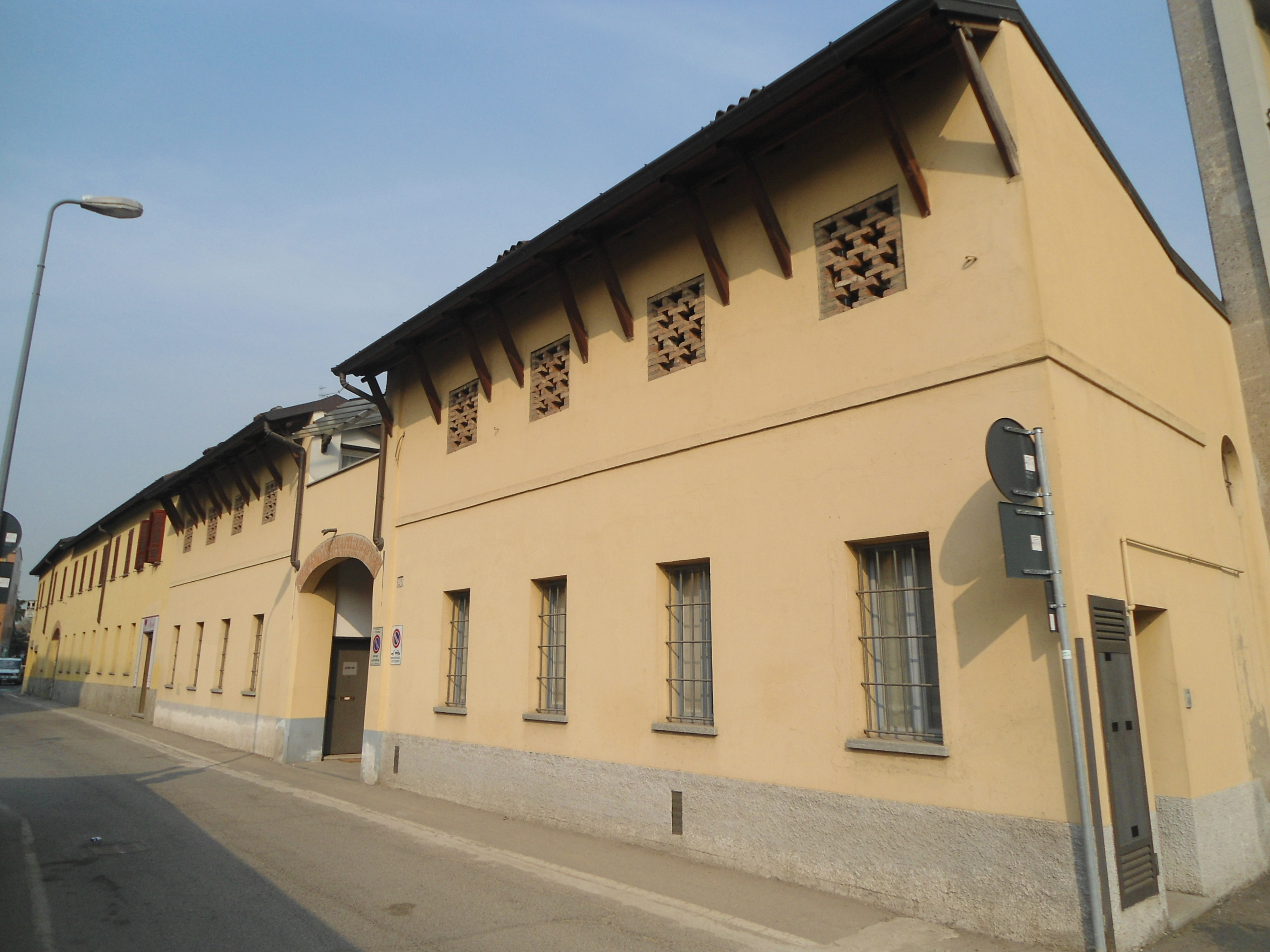
The old farmhouse of Via Barnaba Oriani, 44-48

The expansion of housing for the part of the quarter in proximity of Svincolo Viale Certosa, is later for industrial presence in its territory, and since the 60s and 70s onwards. The ancient road connecting to the Charterhouse of Garegnano, Via Barnaba Oriani, changes its appearance. The latest farms, in the half way, in the 70s and 80s are replaced from buildings of 7-9 floors with the adjacent Via Pannunzio, gradually erasing any memory of the old village Garegnano Marcido. No trace remains today of the birthplace of Barnaba Oriani and the villa of Petrarch origin.

Even the gardens of Via Trapani in time disappear and only the farm house numbers 44 and 48 with the Osteria del 48 and some home degraded reminiscent of the old village. The traffic changes, the one-way between Viale Espinasse and Via Luciano from the direction toward the Certosa, has been directed to Viale Espinasse to alleviate traffic along the inhabited part.

In the 90s the shrine with the painting of The Virgin and Child of the old oratory at No. 29 was replaced with a copy, moved a few feet and placed between two concrete walls.

In 1994 in Via Perin del Vaga, Villapizzone CDA, a little football team, transferred its home in a new soccer center with stands and locker rooms.

The municipal building of Via Ludovico di Breme, 59 which in the past had been a nursing home was demolished at the end of the 90s and the space is now lying unused.

Viale Certosa, traditional access to the city and close to the Fieramilanocity, is the ideal place to be able to welcome tourists or people engaged in business. Arise at the intersection of Via Casella, Hotel Casella, 104-106, which becomes enlarged Hotel Mirage and Hotel Raffaello, 108. At 184-200 you instead build the barracks popular, local residents grow considerably. Towards the avenue of plane trees a series of windows of buildings, are largely catering facilities or service centers and at the intersection with Via Polidoro da Caravaggio, numbering 150, a Buffetti Group shop, office products.

Via Varesina still houses the living quarters with older buildings, and here time seems to stand still. Commercial spaces see bars, pizzerias and dining establishments. Post office at Via Varesina, 161-163 closes at the end of the 80s.

The district does not have green spaces: the only public flowerbed is on the side of house numbers in Piazzale Accursio. The trees in the neighborhood are only the sycamores in Viale Certosa.

Foreign immigration is relevant as in the rest of the periphery of the city, mainly concentrated in Via Varesina and Viale Certosa.

The interior of the district as a whole is a collection of buildings of businesses and homes in most recent, built after 1980, while the area around Viale Espinasse has undergone the least change.

=== Industry ===
From 1930 onwards, the industrial growth raises in the neighborhood the first companies, small and medium-sized enterprises with buildings and smaller laboratories. The ability to transport goods without entering the city and easy access to the area for workers from outside or from Milan has contributed to its industrial vocation.

Even the Milano Certosa railway station was used to transport goods: a railroad from Alfa Romeo at Portello came in the neighborhood in Via Giovanni da Udine, ran through the present Via Pannunzio to go through the fields in Via Alassio where it entered in the station, time that look far away as slightly different is the geography of the district. Still remains, however, a small stretch of the track of that railroad in Via Giovanni da Udine, Viale Certosa corner.

Over time, especially from the 70s onwards, small industrial activities have been converted, closed or relocated. The industrial goods were replaced by companies that offer industrial services. In this way, there has been a gradual shift to larger buildings and modern.

The perimeter of the streets Via Ludovico di Breme, Via Galliari, Locchi, Via Giovanni da Udine, Via Brunetti, Via Alassio, Via Cantoni are entirely industrial, as well as Via Montefeltro.

Multinational companies settled in the area in the twentieth century are:

- Bayer with the offices in a building with large windows in Viale Certosa, 230
- De Agostini with offices in a modern building isolated alongside Svincolo Viale Certosa in front of the Certosa di Garegnano in Via Montefeltro, 6/B
- Sandvik, with a large settlement in Via Varesina, 184
- Richemont, luxury brands, Via Ludovico di Breme, 45 corner Via Locchi, which since 2011 has moved its headquarters

Other notable companies:

- Asystel, Information Communication Technology, from 80's with its two offices in Via Perin del Vaga, 16 and Viale Certosa, 220
- Bahco, tools, Via Varesina, 204
- Hesa, electronic security and surveillance cameras, Via Triboniano, 25
- Italmondo, logistics, Viale Espinasse, 163
- Italtriest, operating in the field of advertising, Via Ludovico di Breme, 79 from 1952
- Rima, bearings, Via Brunetti, 10
- Pelikan, Via Alassio, 10, has closed this site in the late 90
- Danielli, plastics, closed in 2003, its historic headquarters in Via Montefeltro, 4

It's remarkable the presence in the district of activities related to the sale and repair of cars: dealerships, workshops, bodyshops. In 1971, the subsidiary Renault is built in Viale Certosa, 144 on 12,000 m^{2} (129,167 sq ft) then closed in the early 2000s. Mitsubishi creates its exhibition space in the 80s in Viale Certosa 146-148, with assistance in the adjacent streets, Via Polidoro da Caravaggio and Giovanni da Udine. In 2012 the branch closes as the Fiat dealership did in Viale Espinasse, 110 at the end of the 90s.

In Viale Espinasse, 137 with an old door entry, you will find a home of Milan Automobile Club d'Italia. Within the same area a historical body of district Carrozzeria Monte Altissimo.

=== The 2000s ===
The process of transformation of the neighborhood did not stop for the part of the district closer to Svincolo Viale Certosa.

The industrial crisis has accelerated changes for the neighborhood, creating abandoned areas. Part of the new spaces have been converted into dwellings, other into new offices with a tendency to verticality of the area. In general, the district suffers from the lack of a subway station.

In Via Montefeltro arise new offices of 8-9 floors as at number 6 with Euronics. The historical site of Danielli, with its buildings in Via Montefeltro, 4 is being replaced with a modern glass skyscraper completed in 2005, which houses offices of the Binda Group, watches. The presence of the old company in the district remains by the long-kept flower beds in Via Barnaba Oriani.

The Double Tree hotel owned by the Hilton was built in 2010 in Via Ludovico di Breme, 77 on the spaces vacated by the downsizing of Italtriest, enlivening the neighborhood with a large foreign presence even in passing. Casaforte, a hotel of things, replaces Pelikan in the space of Via Alassio, 10

Many activities with the crisis in the car are closes as branches of Renault and Mitsubishi, while also creating new opportunities. Opel moved to Via Mola, 48 corner Via Ludovico di Breme, with SempionCar that ends in 2012. BMW Motorrad opens in Via Ludovico di Breme, 2.

McDonald's opens at Viale Certosa, 134 in a building that was previously a nightclub and at No. 228 corner of Piazzale dei Laghi, with the renovation of the historic Shell service station is built a Burger King and an Autogrill bar. Also in the first decade are opened a Penny Market in Viale Espinasse, 136 and a Lidl in Via Giovanni da Udine, 28 which replaces a point of sale of Bergamaschi and Vimercati, household items, Billa takes over Standa in Viale Espinasse.

For the road the extension of the tram line 12 from Via Console Marcello to Roserio saw the construction of the tracks in Via De Rossi with new traffic lights in Piazzale Santorre di Santarosa, while the tram line 33 ceases its passage in the district after 50 years with tram type 1928.

In 2005 the Church of Our Lady of Good Help, also called the Sanctuary of Our Lady of Perpetual Help, was demolished. This was a prefab built in 1959 at the corner of Via Brunetti and Piazzale Cacciatori delle Alpi; mass had not been regularly celebrated at this location.

== Roads and transports ==
=== Roads ===
Viale Certosa is the busiest arterial road of the neighborhood, with its traffic out of the city crossing the Svincolo Viale Certosa access all the directions of Lake Highway and Highway Torino-Venezia.

The other two-way parallel sliding of the district, Via Varesina and Viale Espinasse, along with Via Console Marcello in Villapizzone share the traffic for Via Palizzi Bridge and quarters Quarto Oggiaro and Vialba.

The opening of a new entrance to Svincolo Viale Certosa in the 90s, at the corner of Via Brunetti and Via Alassio, has streamlined the circulation of the district as vehicles coming from Quarto Oggiaro Vialba can access to Svincolo only ran along the neighborhood without going along Via Ludovico di Breme and Viale Certosa. Access to the new entrance is from the end of Viale Espinasse.

In 1995 the old Palizzi bridge that cleared the Torino-Milano railway, allowing the access to the district Vialba and Quarto Oggiaro, has been tear down. The circulation of the old bridge through which passed both trams that private vehicles has been replaced by two new bridges, one for private means and one for the trams. The new bridge also has a way out for Via Console Marcello at Villapizzone. The viability of the area has improved greatly.

=== Transports ===
The district is well served by public transport, train, bus or tram. There are no subway lines.

Train:

The new Milano Certosa railway station became the base of Milan Passante railway on 1999, and trains are more frequently than before to Novara, Varese and Milan city. No more direct trains go to Torino.

Stazione di Milano Certosa:

- Varese - Treviglio
- Novara - Treviglio

Runs every 15 minutes

Via Montefeltro stop:

- ATM z301 Milano-Bergamo
- Movibus suburban lines: z602 for Legnano, z603 for San Vittore Olona, z617 for Lainate/Origgio
- Airpullman: 560 Milano QT8 - Arese
- Autostradale, Sadem: Milano - Torino

Viale Certosa, 130 stop:

- ATM z301 Milano-Bergamo

ATM bus:

- lines 40 Bonola M1 - Niguarda Parco Nord
- lines 57 Cairoli - Quarto Oggiaro

Tram:

- line 1 Piazza Castelli - Greco (2 rides in the early morning start from Piazzale Cacciatori delle Alpi)
- lines 12 Viale Molise - Roserio carried out with tram ATM Class 4900
- lines 19 Porta Genova - Roserio carried out with tram ATM Class 1500, as known as the twenty-eight

Since 2000, we have followed various modifications of terminus: 19 started at Via Cantù and 33 arrived in Remembrance of Lambrate. The outer terminus of the line 33 was first moved to Piazzale Cacciatori delle Alpi, then the line, in 2007, was finally removed with its temporary replacement by line 7, and then 11, became in a short time removed.

The line 12 route in the district is recent, from the 2000s onwards, with the extension of the line from the terminus of Via Console Marcello at Villapizzone up to Roserio.

The tram terminus of Piazzale Cacciatori delle Alpi is currently unused, apart from the two rides of line 1, is sometimes used as a temporary terminus for problems on the movement of trams or when the outer one of Roserio is unreachable. The terminus was a strategic hub for the area, for its proximity to the Milan Certosa station. With the extension of the tram lines in Roserio and the station proximity to the stop of Via Palizzi, in Vialba, its importance has failed.

== The area ==
=== Boundaries ===
The district borders:

- West: Garegnano with partition Ghisallo Bridge, Svincolo Viale Certosa
- North: Vialba with limit Turin–Milan railway
- North-East: Villapizzone with divisive Via Varesina, Via Palizzi
- South-East: Quartiere Cagnola, border Via Sonnino, Via Nansen, Piazzale Accursio
- South-West: Boldinasco, border Viale Certosa

The odd or even numbers track of the partition belong to a district or other.

== Services ==
=== District services ===
Schools:

The school of the district is the primary school Alfredo Cappellini, at Via de Rossi, 2

Kindergartens

- Scuola dell'infanzia Maria Consolatrice, Via Ampezzo, 8
- Private kindergartens, Tutti giù per terra in Via Polidoro da Caravaggio, 25.

Church

- Parish Saint Marcellina and Saint Joseph at Charterhouse, Viale Espinasse, 85

The north part of the district refers to Certosa di Garegnano.

Shopping centers:

- Billa, Viale Espinasse, 21
- Penny Market, Viale Espinasse, 137
- Lidl, Via Giovanni da Udine, 28

Pharmacies:

- Via Varesina, 121
- Viale Espinasse, 30

Newsstands:

- Viale Espinasse, 84
- Via Montefeltro, 4

Service stations:

- Esso, Via Varesina, 169 (corner Via Palizzi and Viale Espinasse)
- IP, Piazzale Santorre di Santarosa
- Shell, Viale Certosa 228 (along Piazzale ai Laghi)

Hotels:

- Hotel Sorrento, Viale Espinasse, 22
- Hotel Mirage, Viale Certosa, 104 - 106
- Hotel Raffaello, Viale Certosa, 108
- Hotel Double Tree, Via Ludovico di Breme, 77

=== Services in neighboring districts ===
The nearest churches are:

- Certosa di Garegnano (Santa Maria Assunta in Certosa)
- San Martino in Villapizzone
- Santa Cecilia (Boldinasco)

These churches belong to the Decanato Cagnola.

Many Kindergartens, primary schools are in Villapizzone, Boldinasco.

Libraries are located at Villapizzone, Vialba, Quartiere Portello

Shopping centers:

- Esselunga, Via Palizzi, 69
- Centro Commerciale Piazza Portello with Iper and Darty, Via Grosotto, 7
- Saturn, Viale Certosa, 2 Quartiere Portello

Mail Centers:

- Viale Monte Ceneri, no number Ghisolfa
- Via Grassi, 1 Vialba

Municipality and Urban Police: Piazzale Accursio, 5

Police:

- Stazione Musocco, Via Mambretti, 32/a Vialba
- Commissariato Quarto Oggiaro, Via Satta, 6

Hospitals: Ospedale Luigi Sacco, Via Grassi

Parks:

- Parco Franco Verga, Quarto Oggiaro
- Monte Stella, QT8

Sports centers:

- Centro Sportivo Pavesi, Via Francesco De Lemene 3, Boldinasco
- Centro Sportivo XXV Aprile, Via Cimabue, 24, QT8

Swimming pools:

- Piscina Cantù, Via Graf, 8, Quarto Oggiaro
- Piscina Lampugnano, Via Lampugnano, 76, Lampugnano
- Lido di Milano, Piazzale Lotto, 15

Subway lines:

Closest subway stops are about 2 km. far: MM1 QT8 (Milan Metro), MM1 Lampugnano, MM1 Uruguay. At Portello is scheduled to stop Milan Metro Line 5, still in construction.

Tram Line 14 passes through the side of Viale Certosa in Boldinasco, but in fact only a few meters from the neighborhood. The route of the line is Lorenteggio - Cimitero Maggiore

== List of streets ==
- Piazzale Accursio ( From Via Sonnnino to Viale Espinasse, even numbers )
- Piazzale ai Laghi ( Even numbers )
- Piazzale Cacciatori delle Alpi
- Piazzale Santorre di Santarosa
- Via Alassio
- Via Ampezzo
- Via Argenta
- Via Baldo degli Ubaldi
- Via Barnaba Oriani ( Up to Cavalcavia del Ghisallo (up numbers 83 e 84 excluded) )
- Via Brunetti
- Via Callisto da Lodi
- Via Cantoni
- Via Casella
- Via De Rolandi
- Via De Rossi
- Via Figino
- Via Galliari
- Via Giovanni da Udine
- Via Locchi
- Via Lucian
- Via Ludovico di Breme
- Via Marcantonio Dal Re
- Via Mola
- Via Montanelli
- Via Montefeltro
- Via Nansen
- Via Niccodemi
- Via Nuvolone
- Via Palizzi (Odd numbers, up to Milano - Torino railway (up number 3) )
- Via Pannunzio
- Via Pantelleria
- Via Perin del Vaga
- Via Polidoro da Caravaggioo numbers
- Via Salvatore Rosa
- Via Sapri ( Fino a ponte Svincolo Viale Certosa (no numbers) )
- Via Sonnino
- Via Tavazzano ( From numbers 11 e 12 onwards )
- Via Trapani
- Via Tribonian ( Up Svincolo Viale Certosa underpass, even numbers up to number 25, even number no numbers)
- Via Varesina ( Odd numbers )
- Via Zamboni
- Viale Certosa ( Even numbers, from Piazzale Accursio (number 86) to Cavalcavia del Ghisallo (number 228) )
- Viale Espinasse
- Vicolo Mapelli
