= Cascina Torchiera =

Self-organised squatted farmhouse in Milan, Italy

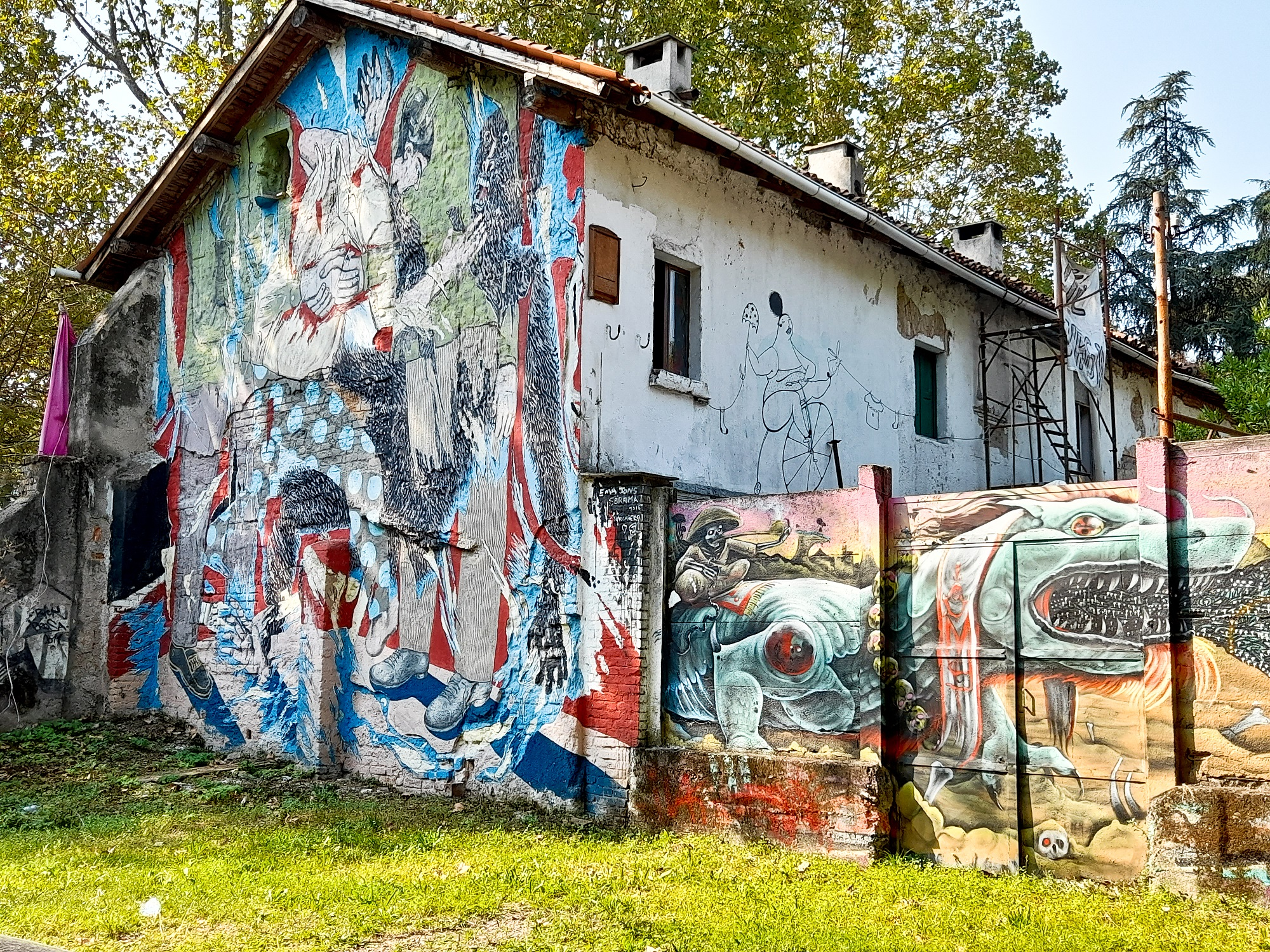

General information
- Type: cascina a corte
- Location: Piazzale Cimitero Maggiore 18, Milan, Italy
- Owner: Comune di Milano

Website
- torchiera.noblogs.org

Cascina Torchiera is a historic cascina a corte (farmhouse) of Milan, Italy, dating back to the first half of the 14th century. It is located in zone 8 of Milan, adjacent to the Maggiore cemetery, in the Musocco/Garegnano district, and is one of the oldest surviving cascine within the city boundaries. The cascina is formally the property of the Comune di Milano city administration and has been a squatted self-managed social centre since the 1992. It is known as Cascina Autogestita Torchiera SenzAcqua.

== History ==
The cascina has undergone several transformations over the centuries. The original building dates back to the 14th century; at the time, it was located in the middle of a large rural area. The name "torchiera" may be a reference to an olive press ("torchio" in Italian) or the manufacturing of hemp rope ("torcitura"). The Mailänder Kataster (an 18th-century cadastre of Milan), reports cultivations of barley and mulberry in the land that surrounded the cascina.

Historically a property of the clergy of the nearby Garegnano Charterhouse, the cascina and the surrounding land (including the Maggiore cemetery) were ceded to the Comune di Milano in 1888. Part of the building was demolished to create a large open space at the entrance of the cemetery; as a consequence, the cascina is now L-shaped, having lost the original square-yarded structure that is typical of cascine. After becoming a property of the Comune, the cascina was adapted for diverse uses such as craft workshops, small shops, and a local seat of the Italian Socialist Party; nevertheless, it was never properly maintained and restored. Eventually there was structural subsidence and a large portion of the roof collapsed.

== Social centre ==
In 1992, the cascina was squatted and turned into an anti-fascist, anti-racist and anti-authoritarian social centre, known as Centro Sociale Autogestito Torchiera. The center remains active in 2020, despite sporadic attempts by Milan's administration to dismantle it or to sell the property. Soon after the occupation, the city administration blocked the water supply, leading the centre to become known as Cascina Autogestita Torchiera SenzAcqua, where "SenzAcqua" means "WithoutWater". In 1999, author Dario Fo prevented an eviction by calling the mayor.

Volunteers from the social centre have been restoring the building since 1994. Social activities in the cascina include theatre performances, gymnastic workshops, book presentations, musical events and Italian language classes for foreigners. In the summer of 2020, the city of Milan decided to sell off 25 unused assets, one of which was the social centre. This had also been considered in 2011. In response, the centre organised a public assembly in early September 2020 in support of autonomous spaces in Milan such as itself, Ri-Make, Lambretta and SOS Fornace Rho.

During the COVID-19 pandemic, the social centre joined the "brigate di solidarietà popolare", providing food and first need goods to the families of the neighborhood.
