= Vialba =

Coordinates: 45°30′53″N 9°07′42″E

- Quartiere of Milan
- Interactive map of Vialba
- Country: Italy
- Region: Lombardy
- Province: Milan
- Comune: Milan
- Zone: 8
- Time zone: UTC+1 (CET)
  - Summer (DST): UTC+2 (CEST)

Vialba is a district ("quartiere") of Milan, Italy, part of the Zone 8 administrative division of the city. It is located north of the city centre, adjacent to the municipality (comune) of Novate Milanese. Until 1841, Vialba itself was an autonomous comune.

== History ==
Documented references to a comune named Villalba date back to at least 1346. When pieves were established in the Milanese territory, Villalba was assigned to the pieve of Bollate. During Napoleonic rule, Vialba was annexed to Bollate itself, but regained its autonomy with the Kingdom of Lombardy–Venetia.

In 1841, Vialba was again annexed to another comune, Musocco, which in turn became part of Milan in 1923.

Vialba remained a rural district until after World War II; thereafter, it developed into a low-income housing residential area, seamlessly connected to the adjacent residential district of Quarto Oggiaro. Vialba and Quarto Oggiaro are sometimes referred to, collectively, as the "quartiere of Vialba-Quarto Oggiaro".

One of Milan's prominent hospitals, the Luigi Sacco hospital, was formerly known as "Sanatorio Vialba", although nowadays the area of the hospital is usually considered part of the Roserio rather than the Vialba district.
