= Quarto Oggiaro =

Coordinates: 45°30′57″N 9°08′25″E

Quarto Oggiaro Quart Oggiee (Lombard)
- Quartiere of Milan
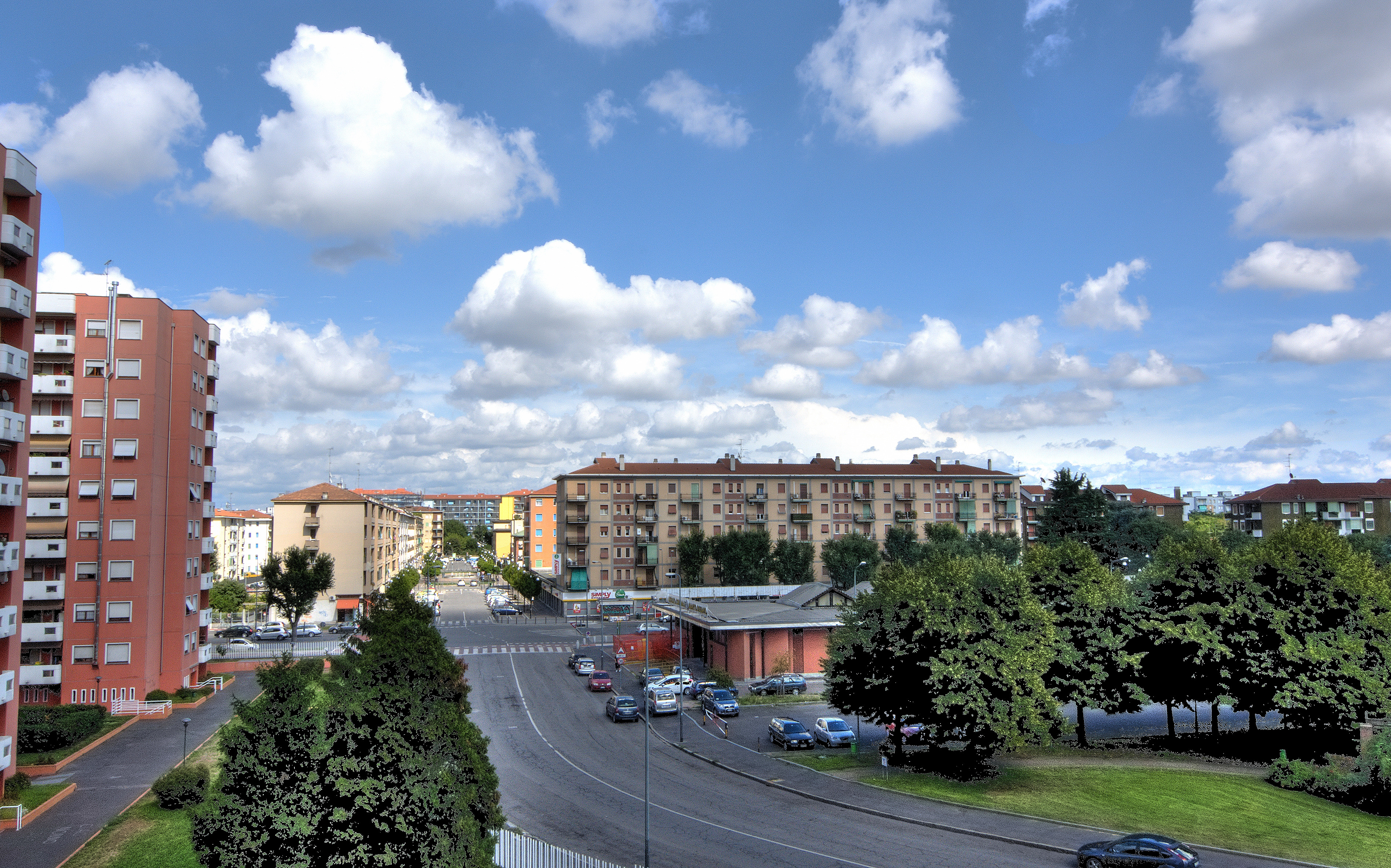
- A view of Via Federico De Roberto
- Interactive map of Quarto Oggiaro
- Country: Italy
- Region: Lombardy
- Province: Milan
- Comune: Milan
- Zone: 8
- Time zone: UTC+1 (CET)
  - Summer (DST): UTC+2 (CEST)

Quarto Oggiaro (Italian pronunciation: [ˈkwarto odˈdʒaːro]; Lombard: Quart Oggiee [ˈkwɑːrt uˈdʒeː]) is a district of Milan in the north-west of the city. It belongs to Zone 8, and has a population of 35000 inhabitants.

== Name ==
The name Quarto Oggiaro derives from the ancient toponymy Quarto Uglerio: the word Quarto, meaning fourth, is a clear reference to the distance of four Roman miles from the center of Milan; while the second part of the name, Uglerio, is supposed to be the name of some influent inhabitant of the area in ancient times. The transformation from Uglerio to Oggiaro can be found on the city maps of 1872, but it can be already seen on some maps of the Spanish period.

Once an autonomous village, Quarto Oggiaro became a frazione of Musocco following the administrative reforms pursued by empress Maria Theresa in the 18th century.

== Boundaries ==
Quarto Oggiaro borders are:

- northward, the comune of Novate Milanese;
- eastward, the districts of Bovisasca and Comasina, which belong to zone 9;
- southward, the district of Villapizzone;
- westward, the districts of Vialba and Musocco.

The border with the municipality of Novate Milanese is a few hundred meters to the south of the A4, in the span between the Milano Certosa interchange and the Milano Cormano exit. Currently this area is a grassland.

The Milan-Saronno railway, particularly the section between Milano Bovisa-Politecnico railway station and Milano Quarto Oggiaro railway station, divides the area from zone 9. The border with Villapizzone is defined by the stretch of the Turin-Milan railway between Milano Certosa railway station and Milano Centrale railway station, up to the junction with the Milan-Saronno railway.

=== Quarto Oggiaro and Vialba ===
In today's breakdown of neighborhoods and statistics for the calculation of the population, the route Via Eritrea – Via Michele Lessona is reckoned as the demarcation between Quarto Oggiaro and Vialba, in fact even numbers of these roads belong to Quarto Oggiaro, while odd numbers belong to the neighborhood of Vialba. The original core of Quarto Oggiaro lies along Via Antonio Aldini, now considered part of the neighborhood Vialba. Nothing prevents you refer to that part and up to the border with Villa Scheibler with its original name, Quarto Oggiaro.

Villa Scheibler, the ancient hunting lodge with its park, is also historically Vialba.

The relationship between the two districts is very strong: both extend from the bridge of Via Palizzi to the extreme north-western outskirts of Milan. The part of Vialba bordering Quarto Oggiaro had the same plan for the urban development of housing and is often considered as part of the Quarto Oggiaro.

The old villages became urban districts with continuous are only partially distinguishable, the division between areas is often absent and the virtual boundary between the older areas frequently becomes the center line of a street of large dimensions. In fact we try to keep names and historical areas in the new urban context. This division is maintained for administrative reasons and of distance between one area and another, although there are no, or only partially, intervals of separation.

== History ==
=== 17th–19th centuries ===
Starting from 1757, Quarto Oggiaro, or Quarto Uglerio, was part of the municipality of Musocco and consisted of a group of houses and farms around the Villa Caimi-Finoli, an aristocratic villa connected to the larger Villa Scheibler, and the Church of Santi Nazario and Celso built at the end of XVIII century. The hamlet developed around the current Via Aldini.

=== 20th century ===
The municipality of Musocco, whose Quarto Oggiaro was a frazione as well as the nearby village of Vialba, remained independent until 1923, when it was included in Milan.

At the end of the forties, after the starting of a massive migration of people from the South looking for a job in the industrial cities of the North, uncultivated areas near Milan, like Quarto Oggiaro, became the place to meet the great population increase of the city.

Quarto Oggiaro, as we see it today, was born in the fifties: in 1954 the first social houses were built, and because of the developments which followed in a short time, the area became one of the largest housing estates in Milan. The district has expanded through a series of housing projects, especially in the sixties, becoming a great dormitory neighborhood, and it took many years before the locals could enjoy basic services. The neighborhood has always been home to numerous immigrants, initially from the southern regions, then non-EU.

Because of the urban plan consisting of only social housing, the problems associated with the effort of the new inhabitants to integrate socially and economically in the city, the management of drug dealings by some families with acts of violence, Quarto Oggiaro was often regarded as a suburb of difficult living conditions, sometimes forgetting the immense efforts made by locals and associations to improve social and environmental sustainability of the district. The housing projects of Via Cesare Pascarella and Via Filippo De Pisis were taken by the media as a symbol of urban and social development of Milan during the 50s and the 60s.

The commercial area of the district developed along Via Federico De Roberto with numerous shops, along Via Fratelli Antona Traversi with the Municipal Market and at the intersection of Via Lessona and Via Carlo Amoretti.

A different fate regarded the southern part of the district, on the border with the Villapizzone: the nearby railway and the Milano Certosa railway station made the area fit for industrial exploitation. The fuel company Fina bought the area in 1926, creating a large storage depot for oil and using the railway to transport it.

==== Construction in the neighborhood ====
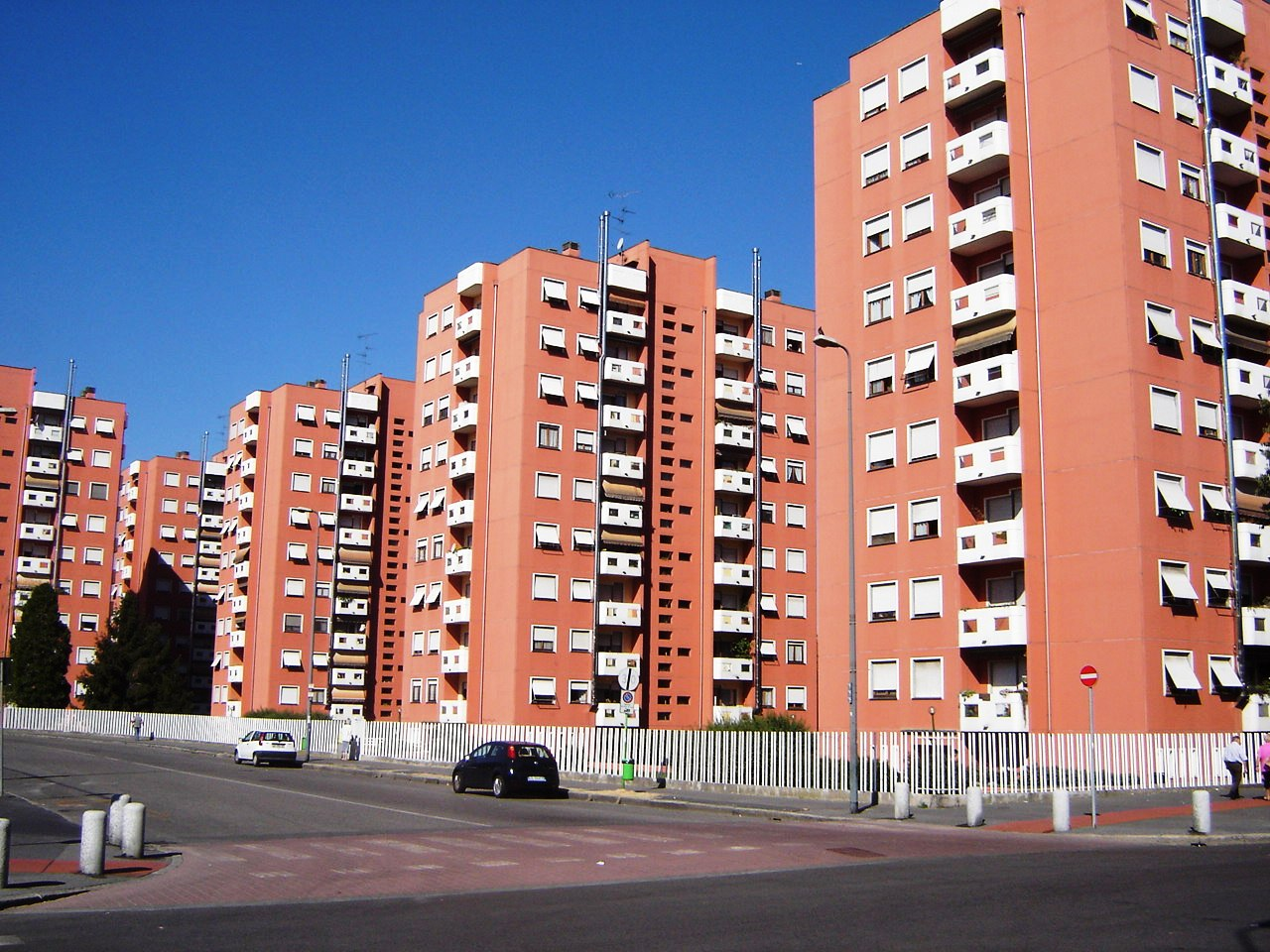
Le Torri in Via De Roberto n. 5, seen from Via Fratelli Antona Traversi

In the development process of Quarto Oggiaro, it is possible to distinguish different housing projects built by the same developers and with a definite residential project. Each project has a name:

- Quartiere Gescal (formerly Ina Casa), beside Via Longarone, is one of the greatest examples of social housing, as the developer tried to create a small self-sufficient village on the model of English urbanism. This district is also called Vialba II.
- Quartiere IACP "Quarto Oggiaro", located among Via Amoretti, Via Luigi Capuana and Via Pascarella.
- Quartiere Aldini I along Via Concilio Vaticano II.
- Quartiere Aldini II, located between Via Arturo Graf and Via De Pisis.
- Le Torri (the Towers), at the intersection of Via Michele Lessona and Via Federico De Roberto.

=== 21st century ===
More than 50 years have passed since the birth of modern Quarto Oggiaro, and it continues to have a peculiar identity, due to its peripheral location, enclosed by the railways, and the development plan that led to the construction of the district.

The Associazione Quarto Oggiaro Vivibile, a neighborhood association operating since the early 80's, manages the park located between Villa Scheibler and Via Carolina Invernizio, which until the seventies housed a gypsy camp. The park has been equipped with a playground, basketball courts, a football field, becoming a popular meeting place.

The social houses within the district have been fully restored, and a pedestrian area was created in 2008 in Via De Roberto, in front of the church of Santa Lucia.

The Cabassi quarry, along the Milan-Saronno railway was closed in 1997 and the area was rearranged: it is now the Parco Simoni, with a surface area of approximately 20,000 m^{2} (215,278 sq ft).

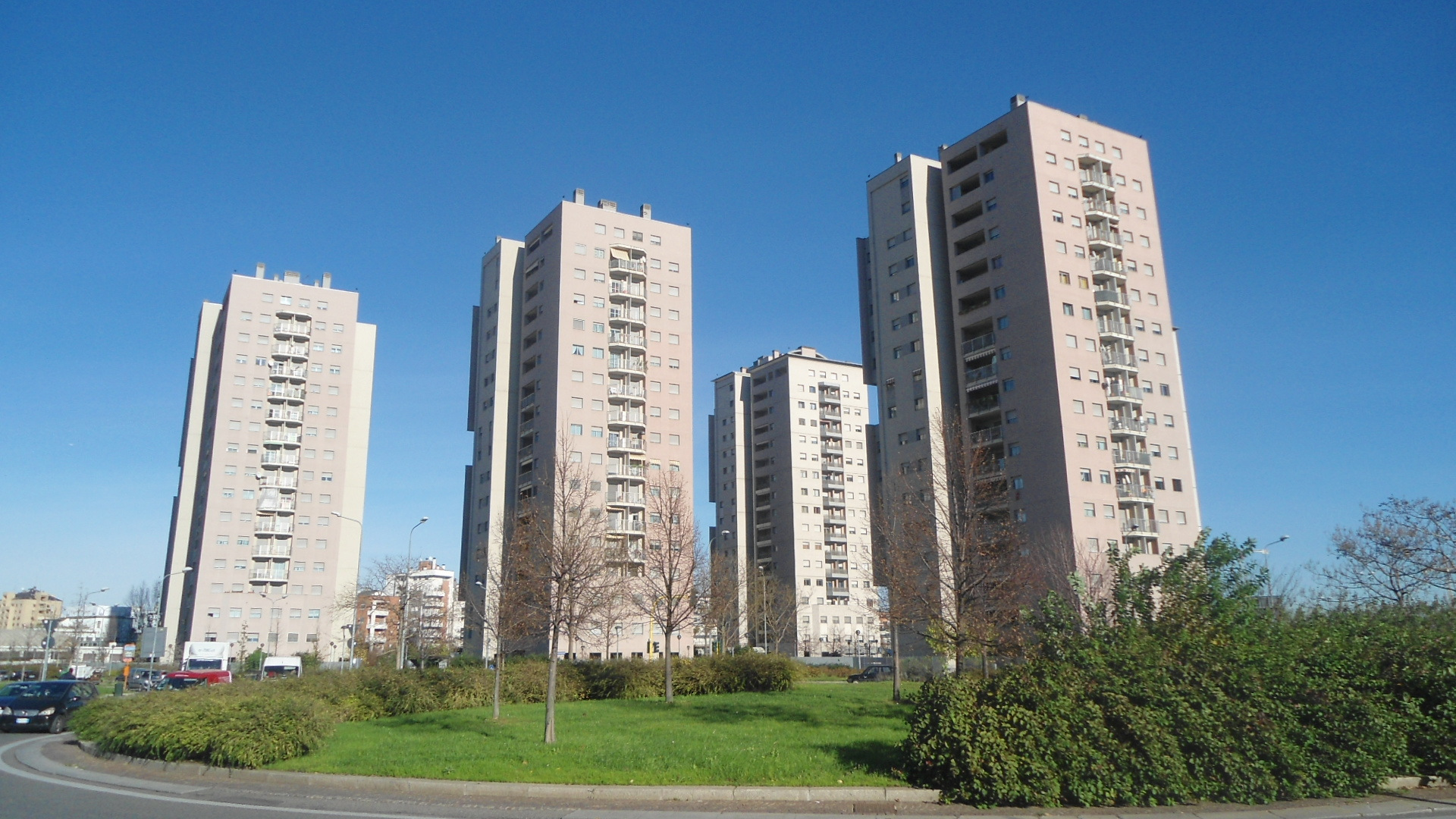
EuroMilano towers as seen from the roundabout of Via Palizzi

A remarkable refurbishment project regards the area of the former Fina refinery, along Via Castellammare. The EuroMilano company, entrusted a project to the British designer Diana Armstrong Bell and in the late 90s and early 2000s, has enhanced an area of over 450,000 m^{2} (4,843,760 sq ft), creating a new fine residential district. The new estate overlooks Via Eritrea with 6 towers of 15 floors, while lower buildings were built beside Via Carlo Perini. Almost half of the area, 200,000 sqm, has become a park named after the activist and MP Franco Verga, located among the railway, the new residential complex and Via Dante Chiasserini.

== Transports ==
=== Main roads ===
Quarto Oggiaro is connected to the city center by the bridge of Via Filippo Palizzi, refurbished in the late nineties, which crosses the Turin-Milan railway.

Via Eritrea, enlarged and rearranged with the EuroMilano project, and Via Michele Lessona are the main roads of the district in north–south direction. Via Carlo Amoretti, with west–east direction, connects the district to Bovisasca crossing Milan-Saronno railway with a bridge

The major part of Quarto Oggiaro is delimited by Via Eritrea, Via Lessona and Via Amoretti, with the exception of Via Longarone and of a little stretch of Via Lessona, which are located north of Via Amoretti.

Other significant roads of the district includes Via Fratelli Antona Traversi, Via Cesare Pascarella, Via Sebastiano Satta, Via Privata Trilussa and Via Arturo Graf.

=== Railway ===
The district is well connected to the city center, the neighboring districts and municipalities through the railway system.

The neighborhood has its own railway station, which is located under the bridge of Via Amoretti, near the border with Zone 9. The entrance to the station is on Via Renato Simoni. There are two lines managed by Trenord and belonging to Milan suburban railway service:

- Line 1 provides quick access to the urban route of Milan Passante railway;
- Line 3 quickly connects to the city center in Piazzale Cadorna and to Saronno.

Milano Certosa railway station, near the border with Quartiere Vialba, provides access to two lines of the suburban railway service:

- Line 5;
- Line 6.

=== Bus and tram ===
The ATM operates two tram lines that pass near the neighborhood, on the bridge of Via Palizzi:

- tram line 1, which connects Quarto Oggiaro to the city center, to Viale Molise and to Roserio;
- tram line 19, connecting the district to Corso Sempione, Porta Genova and Roserio.

The bus lines enter into the district:

- bus line 40 (Niguarda Parco Nord – Bonola M1) goes from the bridge of Via Palizzi to Quartiere Vialba and returns to Quarto Oggiaro traveling along Via Amoretti;
- bus line 57, allowing direct access to the city center, has its terminus in Via Concilio Vaticano II, and travels the city up to is Cairoli – Piazza Castello.

== Places of interest ==
=== Churches ===
The churches of the district belong to the deanery of Quarto Oggiaro:

- Santi Nazario and Celso, at n. 33 of Via Aldini, was built in 1780: it is dedicated to the martyrs Nazarius and Celsus and is a landmark of the old part of Quarto Oggiaro;
- Santa Lucia church, at n. 20 of Via De Roberto, was built in 1961 and dedicated to Saint Lucy;
- Resurrezione di Nostro Signore Gesù Cristo, located at n. 5 of Via Longarone, is dedicated to the Resurrection of Our Lord Jesus Christ;
- Pentecostal church, at n. 29 of Via Graf, is a prefab used by the Pentecostal community.

=== Schools ===
Kindergartens:

- Nursery School at n. 7 of Via Graf;
- Nursery School at n. 8 of Via Capuana
- Private nursery school at n. 52 of Via Aldini;
- Private nursery school at n. 70 of Via Lessona;

The kindergarten that was located at n. 10 of Via Aldini, on the corner of Via Fratelli Antona Traversi, was demolished in the late nineties and replaced by a park dedicated to Gian Luigi Bonelli.

Elementary Schools:

- Trilussa elementary school, at n. 70 of Via Graf, with a branch at n. 10 of Via Trilussa.

Middle schools

- Trilussa middle school, at n. 74 of Via Graf;
- Giambattista Vico middle school, at n. 25 of Via Felice Orsini.

High schools

- A branch of the Paolo Frisi professional institute, previously located at n. 74 of Via Aldini, is now on Via Amoretti, near the railway overpass.

=== Sports centers ===
- Cantù swimming pool, at n. 8 of Via Graf;
- Centro Sportivo R. Zoppini, formerly known as Aldiniana Associazione Calcio, and home of the ASD Sempione Half 1919.

=== Shopping malls ===
- Esselunga, at n. 69 of Via Palizzi, built at the beginning of 2000, is a reference point of the district;
- Carrefour, at n. 4 of Via Amoretti;
- Simply Market, at n. 18 of Via Fratelli Antona Traversi, on the corner of Via De Roberto, previously managed by Sma and, until the 90s, by Upim;
- Unes, at n. 26 of Via Trilussa;
- Mercato Comunale, at n. 19 of Via Fratelli Antona Traversi.

=== Libraries ===
The Quarto Oggiaro public library was opened in 2003 in a building that housed the old public showers. The library is located at n. 7 of Via Otranto, on the corner of Via Carbonia, in the nearby district of Vialba.

=== Other services ===
- The post office, at n. 12 of Via Giuseppe Ungaretti;
- The Carabinieri police station, at n. 6 of Via Sebastiano Satta;
- The hospital, dedicated to Luigi Sacco, on Via Giovanni Battista Grassi.

== References in popular culture ==
Quarto Oggiaro has been used as a setting for several movies, including A due calci dal paradiso (2006) and Chemical Hunger (2003).

== Notable people ==
Notable people who lived in Quarto Oggiaro include:

- Gianni Barbacetto, journalist and writer
- Gianni Biondillo, writer
- Davide De Marinis, pop singer and songwriter
- Michele Didoni, race walker
- Sandro Lopopolo, boxer
- Cristina Scabbia, singer of the Lacuna Coil rock band
- Tito Stagno, journalist, mostly known for reporting on state television the July, 1969, Moon landing of Apollo 11
- Vacca (rapper), rapper, songwriter
