= Roserio =

Coordinates: 45°31′03″N 9°07′10″E

- Quartiere of Milan
- Interactive map of Roserio
- Country: Italy
- Region: Lombardy
- Province: Milan
- Comune: Milan
- Zone: 8
- Time zone: UTC+1 (CET)
  - Summer (DST): UTC+2 (CEST)

Roserio is a district ("quartiere") of Milan, Italy, part of the Zone 8 administrative division of the city. It is the northernmost district, bordering on the comune of Baranzate. Before being annexed to Milan, it has been an autonomous comune, as well as part of Bollate and of Musocco.

Roserio is best known for the Luigi Sacco hospital, located in Piazzale Roserio, which is a prominent hospital of Milan, and the most advanced in the treatment of infectious diseases.

Roserio's main connection to Milan is a tramway (line 12) that has its terminal in Piazzale Roserio; the tramway goes south to the very centre of Milan (Piazza Duomo). Anyway, due to its geographical location, Roserio is much more connected to Baranzate than it is to Milan.

Roserio is also the seat of a major CMP (Centro di Meccanizzazione Postale, Postal Mechanization Centre), i.e., a centre devoted to forwarding and sorting mail (especially international mail). In the 2000s, the Roserio CMP has been largely criticized for poor service, long delays and lost packages.

== History ==
Roserio developed from an ancient rural settlement. When the Milanese territory was partitioned into pieves, Roserio was assigned to the pieve of Bollate. Under Napoleonic rule, it became part of Bollate, to regain its autonomy with the advent of the Kingdom of Lombardy–Venetia. In 1869 it was annexed to Musocco, which in turn became part of Milan in 1923.

After being annexed to Milan, the area of Roserio changed rapidly from a rural to a suburban environment. A major development of the area occurred with the construction of the Luigi Sacco hospital and connections to the A4 and Laghi motorways.

== References in popular culture ==
Italian writer Giovanni Testori, who was born in Novate Milanese (a few kilometers away from Roserio) chose this district as a setting for his novel Il Dio di Roserio ("Roserio's God", 1951), part of the series I segreti di Milano ("The secrets of Milan").
