= Villa Arconati, Bollate =

Rural palace in Bollate, Italy

Coordinates: 45.5560°N 9.0963°E

The Villa Arconati, also known as the Castellazzo Degli Arconati, is a rural palace and gardens, located in the district of Castellazo of the town of Bollate, northwest of Milan, Italy. Built-in a grand Baroque style over the 17th and 18th centuries, it now functions as a museum and host for events and meetings.

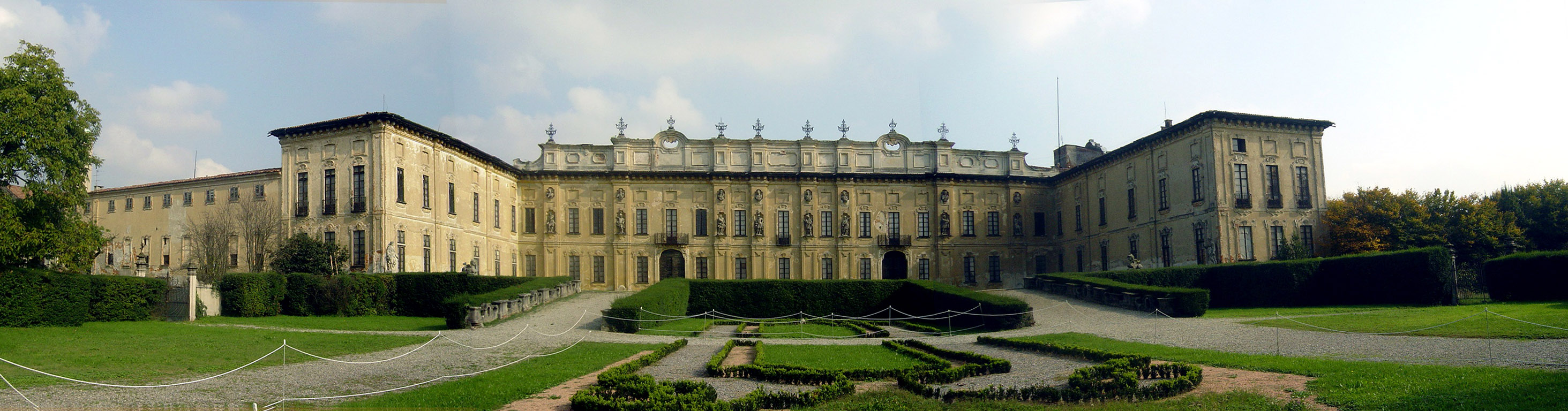
Facade

== History ==
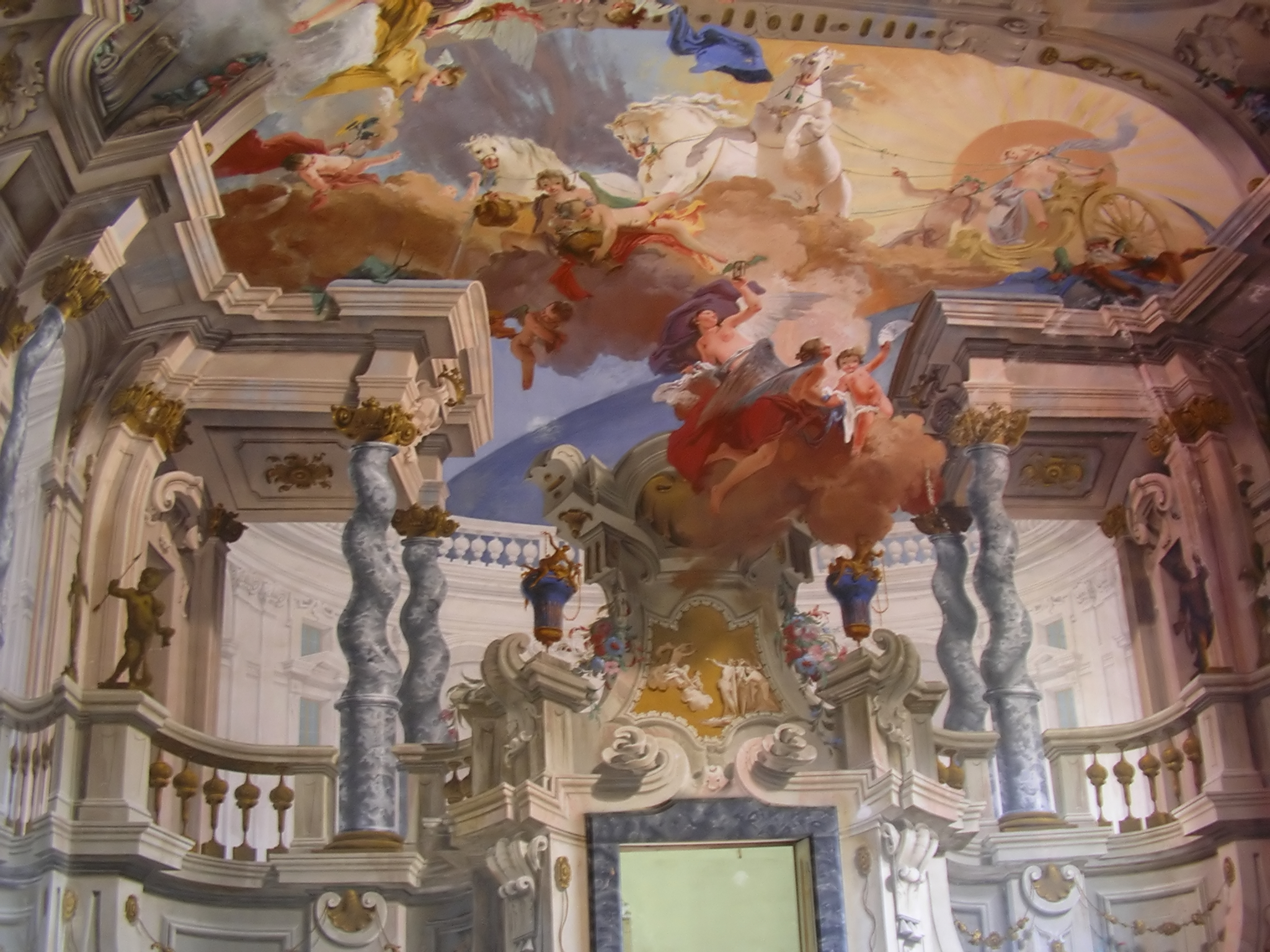
Galliari fresco of Chariot of Apollo

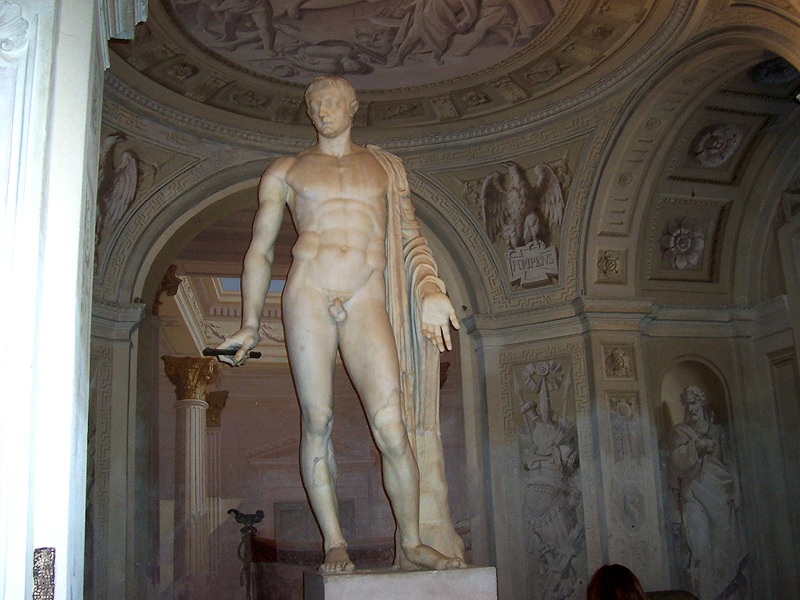
Roman statue Pompey the Great

A Castellazzo or castle was acquired in 1610 by Galeazzo Arconati, cousin of Cardinal Federico Borromeo. Galeazzo was a patron of the arts and served as the rector of the Fabbrica del Duomo of Milan. Under Galeazzo's ownership, the castle-palace on the site was reconstructed and refurbished. It was also Galeazzo who, during the year 1621 brought to the structure his collection of ancient Roman sculpture, including a standing statue said to be Pompey the Great, but also the remaining fragments of the Renaissance style Funereal Monument of Gaston of Foix, Duke of Nemours (died 1512) by Agostino Busi. Galeazzo was also at the one-time owner of the Codex Atlanticus of Leonardo da Vinci.

The gardens were restructured in 1621. Construction on the site continued after 1648 under grandson's leadership, the Count Luigi Maria Arconati, and in 1671 under his great-grandson Giuseppe Maria Arconati. In 1718, Giuseppe Antonio Arconati, grandson of Giuseppe Maria, and remembered also for his patronage of Carlo Goldoni, inherits the palace. In 1742, the architect Giovanni Ruggeri was employed in embellishments and expansions. The Galliari brothers: Bernardino, Fabrizio, and Giovanni Antonio, were employed in the fresco decoration of the interior of the Villa.

After 1772, the palace passed on to the Busca family, who commissioned further works, including the trompe l'oeil frescoes in the entrance stairwell, attributed to Giocondo Albertolli. During the 20th century, the villa was inherited by the Marchesa Beatrice Crivelli. Many of the removable items inside the villa were auctioned in 1989. The società Palladium and others have recently purchased the Villa and since 2011 hosts the Fondazione Augusto Rancilio, which seeks to maintain and restore the site, and foster its use. The Villa is also now part of a network of Ville Gentilizie Lombarde, a project of the Region of Lombardy, supported by the Fondazione Cariplo. The Ville Gentilizie Lombarde sponsors a project integrated project both in terms of the strategies of recovery and management of this heritage, and its use by the public through guided visits, educational programs, and events.

The gardens, whose 18th-century layout was documented by the engraver Marc'Antonio dal Re, are also under restoration.
