= Baranzate =

Baranzate Baranzaa (Lombard)
- Comune
- Comune di Baranzate
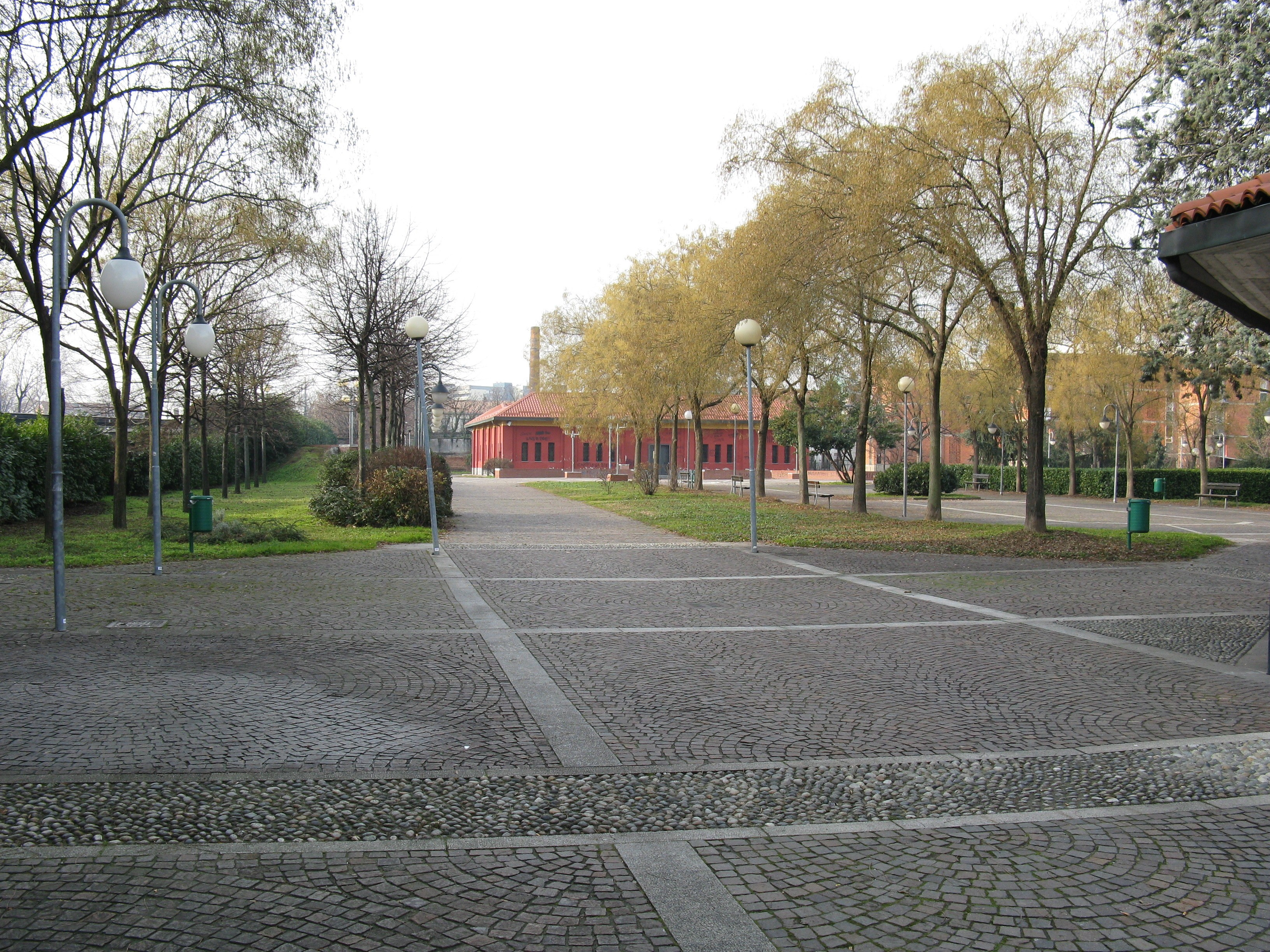
- Piazza Falcone

- Flag Coat of arms

- Location within Italy Location within Lombardy
- Coordinates: 45°31′N 9°6′E
- Country: Italy
- Region: Lombardy
- Metropolitan city: Milan (MI)

Government
  - Mayor: Luca Mario Elia

Area
  - Total: 2.78 km^{2} (1.07 sq mi)
- Elevation: 155 m (509 ft)

Population (2026)
  - Total: 12,129
  - Density: 4,360/km^{2} (11,300/sq mi)
- Demonym: Baranzatesi
- Time zone: UTC+1 (CET)
  - Summer (DST): UTC+2 (CEST)
- Postal code: 20021
- Dialing code: 02
- Website: Official website

Baranzate (Milanese: Baranzaa [barãˈtsaː]), is a town and comune (municipality) in the Metropolitan City of Milan in the region of Lombardy in Italy, about 8 kilometres (5 mi) northwest of Milan. It has 12,129 inhabitants.

Baranzate is bordered by Bollate to the north and northwest, Novate Milanese to the east, and Milan's Roserio district to the south and southwest.

== History ==
Prior to 2001, Baranzate was a frazione of the comune of Bollate. It was established as a comune in its own right in November of that year by the promulgation of a regional law. In 2003 this law was declared unconstitutional by the Constitutional Court of Italy. The establishment of the new comune was annulled, and Barazate became once more a frazione of Bollate. In May 2004 a new regional law re-established the comune.

A ruling in the Court of Justice of the European Union in 2012 involving the comune of Baranzate declared that Italian legislation on local taxation constituted on unlawful restriction of freedom of establishment and freedom to provide services, which are among the fundamental freedoms of the European Union.

== Demographics ==
As of 2026, the population is 12,129, of which 52.8% are male, and 47.2% are female. Minors make up 17.7% of the population, and seniors make up 19.8%.

Historical population

| Year | Pop. | ±% |
|---|---|---|
| 1861 | - | — |
| 1871 | - | — |
| 1881 | - | — |
| 1901 | - | — |
| 1911 | - | — |
| 1921 | - | — |
| 1931 | - | — |
| 1936 | - | — |

| Year | Pop. | ±% |
|---|---|---|
| 1951 | 1,117 | — |
| 1961 | 4,469 | +300.1% |
| 1971 | 12,179 | +172.5% |
| 1981 | 11,367 | −6.7% |
| 1991 | 11,535 | +1.5% |
| 2001 | 11,041 | −4.3% |
| 2011 | 10,779 | −2.4% |
| 2021 | 11,762 | +9.1% |

Source: ISTAT

=== Immigration ===
As of 2025, immigrants make up 37.2% of the population. The 5 largest foreign countries of birth are Egypt, Peru, China, Sri Lanka, and Romania.
