= Ospedale Luigi Sacco =

Hospital in Milan, Italy

Ospedale Luigi Sacco is a hospital in the quartiere of Vialba in Milan, Italy. It was previously known as "sanatorio di Vialba" (Vialba sanitorium). It is named for Luigi Sacco, an Italian physician who pioneered smallpox research and vaccination in Italy.
