= Cimitero Maggiore di Milano =

Cemetery in the Italian municipality of Milan

Coordinates: 45.506709°N 9.114826°E

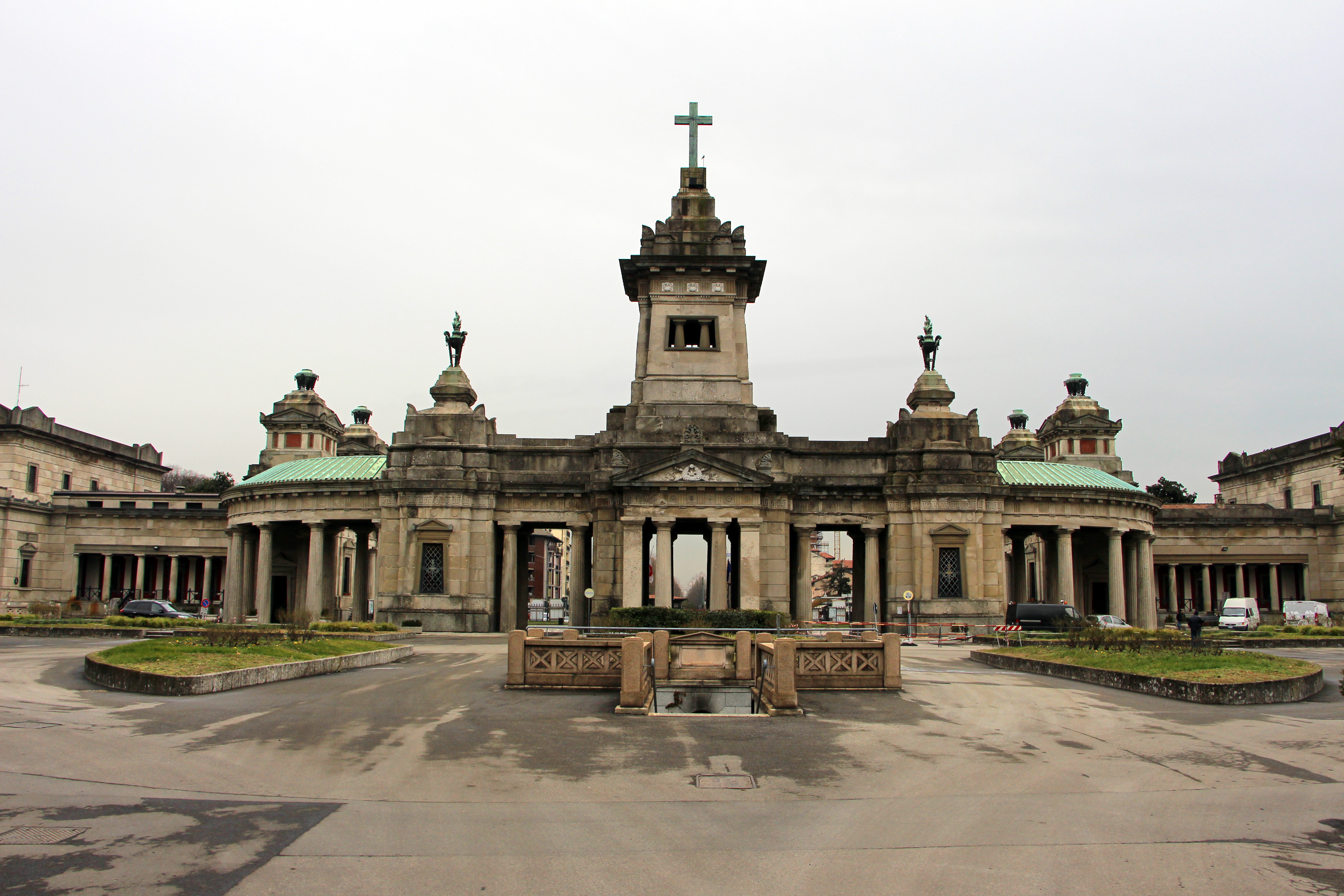
- Interactive map of Cimitero Maggiore di Milano

Details
- Established: 1895
- Location: Milan
- Country: Italy
- Size: 678,624 square metres (7,304,650 sq ft)
- No. of interments: over 500.000

The Cimitero Maggiore di Milano ("Greater Cemetery of Milan"), also known as Cimitero di Musocco ("Musocco Cemetery"), is the largest cemetery of Milan, Italy. It is located in Zone 8, in the Musocco district (formerly a comune of its own), not far from the Garegnano Charterhouse. The cemetery has an overall area of 678,624 m^{2} (including 80,000 m^{2} of green space) with over 500,000 graves.

== History ==
In the 19th century, as a consequence of the rapid demographic growth of Milan, a thorough reorganization of the city's cemeteries was due. At the time, Milan had a large number of small cemeteries located in areas that were originally peripheral but, as the city expanded, they experienced a quick urbanization. Plans were made to close down most of these small cemeteries and build a few, larger ones, in the outskirts of the city. The Monumentale was built first (in the early decades of the century), but it soon became clear that at least another large cemetery was needed. Core samples proved that the rural area of Musocco, bordering on Milan, had suitable geological properties; after some quarrel with Musocco's administration, construction began in the late 19th century, on a design by architects Luigi Mazzocchi and Enrico Brotti. The cemetery opened in 1895; it originally covered an area of 400,000 m^{2}.

Graves from at least four different cemeteries were moved to the Maggiore. A dedicated tram was employed to move the graves; it is said that the people of Milan nicknamed this tram "La Gioconda" ("the joyful one").

Benito Mussolini was buried in an unmarked grave in the Maggiore immediately after his death, although his corpse was later moved, to be eventually buried again in his hometown Predappio.

== See also ==
- Cimitero Monumentale
- Musocco
