= Musocco =

Coordinates: 45°30′32″N 9°07′58″E

- Quartier of Milan
- Interactive map of Musocco
- Country: Italy
- Region: Lombardy
- Province: Milan
- Comune: Milan
- Zone: 8
- Time zone: UTC+1 (CET)
  - Summer (DST): UTC+2 (CEST)

Musocco (Lombard: Musòcch [myˈzɔk]) is a district of Milan, located in the north-western outskirts of the city, belonging to Zone 8.

Until 1923 Musocco was an independent comune, to whom also belonged the localities of Boldinasco, Garegnano, Quarto Oggiaro, Roserio and Vialba.

The name comes from the word musa, which means marsh, indicating that the area was crossed by numerous streams and springs which formed overflowing of swamping. The main waterway is the river Pudiga.

In Milan the name "Musocco" is also often referred to the Main Cemetery of Milan.

== Ancient history ==
Musocco stood kept on the road leading from Milan to Varese, with some farmhouse shed in the middle of a wooded area in part. The earliest records date back to the pastoral visit of St.Charles Borromeo in 1605 with a hundred inhabitants devoted to work in the fields. Musocco turns out to belong to the Pieve of Trenno.

== 18th century ==
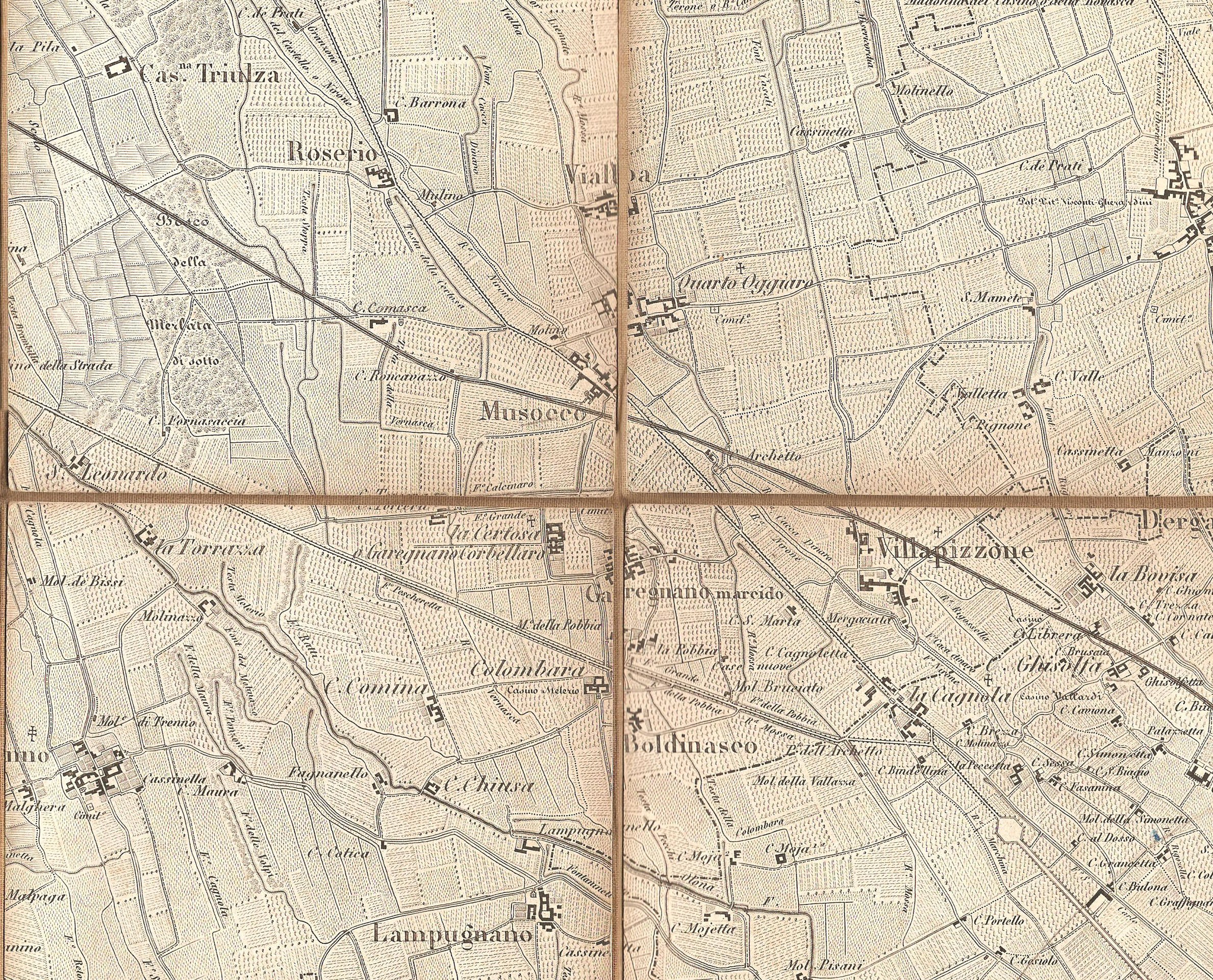
The area around Musocco in 1865 from a map of Giovanni Brenna

Looking at a map of the mid-nineteenth century of the North-West of Milan, one can distinguish, among other areas, Villapizzone, Cagnola, Boldinasco, Garegnano, and, beyond the railway Musocco, Quarto Oggiaro and Vialba. This localization is very similar, apart from the railroad not existing, to that of 1700.

Musocco was the village on the road to Varese about 5 km from the circle of bastions of Milan, with the oratory of St. Joseph, the area around the present Via Mambretti. Quarto Uglerio was a group of houses around the Villa Caimi-Finoli, and the church of Saints Nazarius and Celsus, now Via Aldini, whereas Vialba or Villa Alba, white village, was a little village consisting of a handful of houses inhabited by peasants behind the Villa Scheibler, a patrician villa dating back to the fifteenth century and hunting ground of Ludovico il Moro. The Pudiga stream flowed in the municipality within the park from the Villa passing in its course in front of the church of Quarto Uglerio.

In 1753 the municipality of Musocco appeared to aggregate Quarto Oggiaro. It is part of the Pieve of Trenno, including the Duchy of Milan under the regency of Maria Theresa, counting 203 inhabitants which rose to 474 in 1771. In 1791 it is still inserted in the Pieve of Trenno, included in the XXVII° census district of the province of Milan with the parish church of Saints Nazarius and Celsus.

== From 1797 to 1816 ==
During the Cisalpine Republic, there is a continuous mixing of the territorial organization of northern Italy.

In 1798, the Departement of Olona, of which the town of Musocco is part of it, first as belonging to the district of Baggio, then to that of Bollate. In 1801 became part of the First District Department of Olona, with capital Milan, which became in 1805 the district of Milan, VI canton with 503 inhabitants. With the decree of 9 February 1808, the town of Musocco, like other 34 municipalities with up to 4 miles away from Milan, was deleted and included in the district outside of the city of Milan.

== From 1816 to 1869 ==
With notification of 12 February 1816, in the Kingdom of Lombardy–Venetia, with the Restoration of Austrian rule with Francis II, Holy Roman Emperor, restores the common suppressed during the period of the Cisalpine Republic. Musocco, as well as Vialba, Villapizzone Garegnano Marcido and Garegnano Corbellaro, Boldinasco, are autonomous municipalities of the third political district of the Province of Milan with chief town Bollate. In 1821 the parish census Musocco had 900 inhabitants.

In 1841, with government dispatch of September 2, 1841, under Ferdinand I of Austria, comune of Vialba was suppressed and annexed to Musocco. In 1853 the inhabitants turn out to be 1097 and in 1859 becomes 1192. With the Italian unification in 1861, the area of the district became the ninth commandment of the Province of Milan with chief town Bollate. On the 1st census, Musocco and Uniti, meaning the union with villages Quarto Uglerio and Vialba, turns out to have 1,235 inhabitants spread over 429 hectares of mulberry trees, vines, cereals and vegetables.

== From 1869 to 1923 ==
Surface and Population at the 1861 census of municipalities aggregated to Musocco in 1869
| Comune | Surface (hectares) | Inhabitants |
|---|---|---|
| Boldinasco | 208 | 632 |
| Cassina Triulza | 156 | 107 |
| Garegnano | 166 | 614 |
| Musocco | 429 | 1235 |
| Roserio | 140 | 177 |
| Villapizzone | 185 | 842 |
| Aggiustamenti | 44 | |

With Royal Decree number 4839 of 17 January 1869, Musocco surface changes, as aggregates also Villapizzone Garegnano, Boldinasco merging into one new comune, including Roserio and Cassina Triulza as well. With the new 5 fractions, the territory is expanded from 429 hectares to 1,328 hectares, with 165 hectares occupied by roads and buildings and 1163 agricultural area. The activity of the population is still predominantly agricultural with the presence of breeding silkworms. From 1869 to 1873 borders the municipality of Corpi Santi of Milan, the municipality outside the circle of bastions of Milan, until the latter is incorporated in Milan.

With the advancement of the industrial revolution the town for its strategic location on the border of Milan and the ease of connecting with the rest of the region, is the ideal place for the relocation of industrial settlements.

In the late 60 of the ninententh century is built the Turin-Milan railway with the railway station called Musocco, the current Milano Certosa railway station, which speeds up the process of industrialization of the town which takes place mainly in the first 20 years of the twentieth century. In Via Mambretti, 9 in 1875 was founded Smalteria Moneta by Giovanni Moneta, thriving industry during the war activity that it was able to build 10,000 helmets per day.

Population of Musocco
| Year | Inhabitants |
|---|---|
| 1861 | 1235 |
| 1871° | 3986 |
| 1881 | 4835 |
| 1901 | 5710 |
| 1911 | 11346 |
| 1921 | 15422 |
° From 1871 on enlarged territory

The population grows from 5710 until the turn of the century to more than 15,000 in 1923.

The territory of Musocco changes face at the end of the century when it is decided to build up the Greater Cemetery of Milan within the municipality and the new roads needed. Viale Certosa is built as an extension of Corso Sempione, from Piazza del Bersaglio, the current Piazzale Accursio, to get to the cemetery.

The Town Hall was located in a building in the current Piazzale Santorre Santarosa building still exists, number 10.

In 1903 is made up of 20 members, the Società Edificatrice l'Avvenire of Musocco with the purpose of buying land and build dwelling houses for workers and in general all the buildings targeted to the welfare and improvement of the working class. Grow the number of housing also along Strada della Varesina between Cagnola and rail. It is constructed elementary school General Cantore.

In 1923, by Royal Decree of 2 September 1923, n. 1912 art. 1, is decided the unification of Musocco in Milan, as well as for municipalities Affori, Baggio, Chiaravalle Milanese, Crescenzago, Gorla-Precotto, Greco Milanese, Lambrate, Niguarda, Trenno and Vigentino. The old municipalities become districts of Milan.

== Legacy ==
Musocco to indicate the name of the part of the North-West of Milan remained even after the termination of the existence of the municipality.

The decision to build the cemetery of Milan in the municipality of Musocco, has made known the cemetery with the name of the municipality itself, Musocco, which in the course of time has remained even after the dissolution of the municipality, identifying Musocco with the cemetery and the areas immediately adjacent. In fact, today's district includes the Musocco Cemetery and Garegnano. The present location of the territory referred to as Musocco is a part of the old town of Musocco with enlarged territory from 1869.

The original area of the town of Musocco, that until 1869, the area referred to as Musocco with Quarto Oggiaro and Vialba in the map, has become the current Quartiere Vialba, which was one of its fractions. The other fractions, those merged in 1869, have again become Villapizzone, Boldinasco, Garegnano and Roserio as districts of Milan. Quartiere Varesina arose after the construction of the access road to the Autostrada dei Laghi has incorporated a part of Garegnano coming up to the railway.

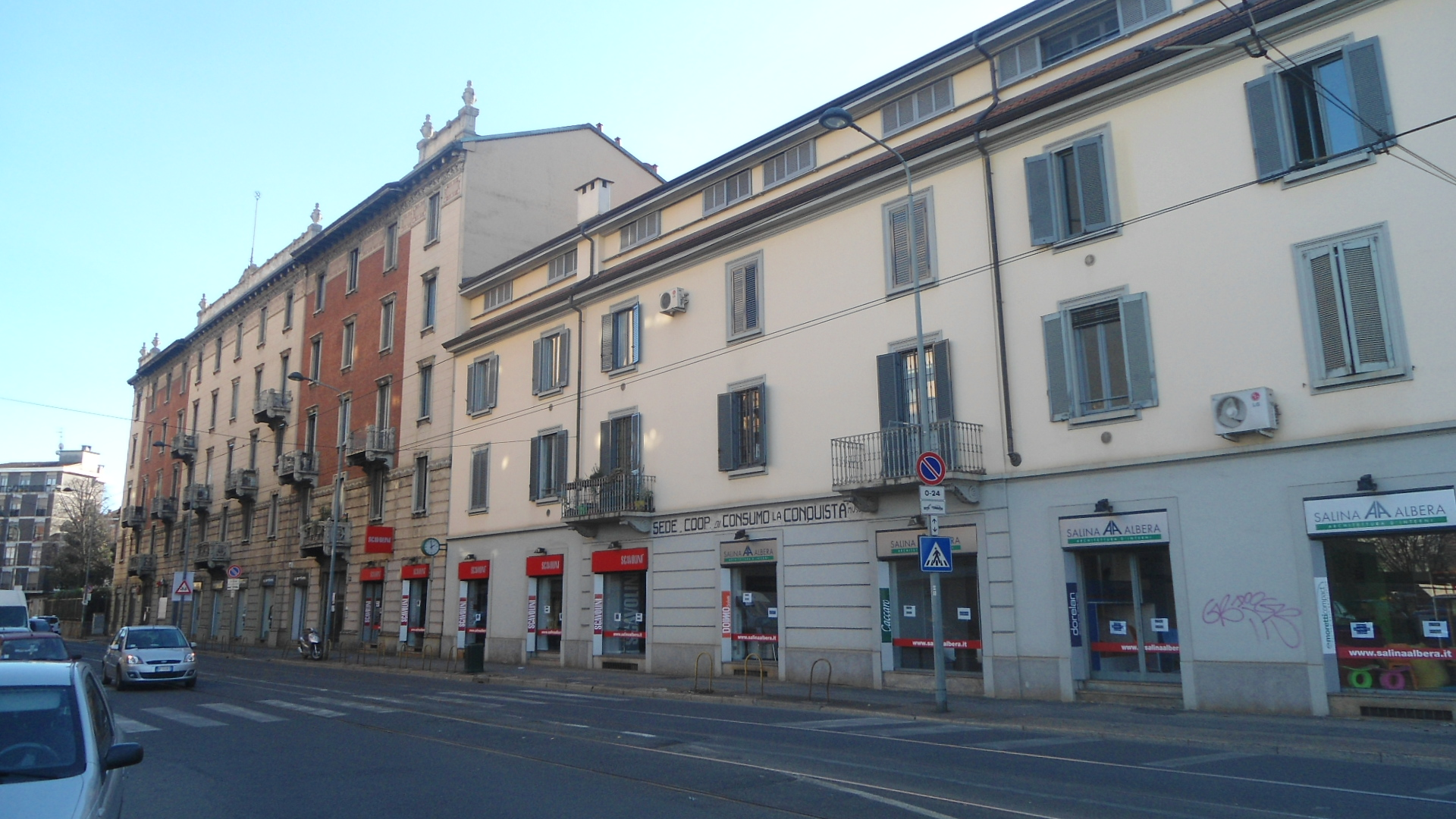
Buildings of Musocco, now, in Via Mambretti between numbers 25 and 29

Of original Musocco village still remain many traces around Via Mambretti, Cinque Maggio and Ameglio. The low houses along Via Mambretti, are the old farm house restored, the number 29 bears the writing Sede Cooperativa La Conquista Musocco, the School General Cantore has become for a long time the Municipal Archive with entrance to number 33 and is now empty, and the police station on 32/A is the station Musocco. The ancient oratory of St. Joseph is located in Via Ameglio and has been desecrated.

In Piazzale Santorre of Santarosa, just when the municipality melts, is erected the War Memorial of Musocco to fallen during the First World War.
