= Bovisasca =

Coordinates: 45°30′59″N 9°09′20″E

- Quartiere of Milan
- Interactive map of Bovisasca
- Country: Italy
- Region: Lombardy
- Province: Milan
- Comune: Milan
- Zone: 9
- Time zone: UTC+1 (CET)
  - Summer (DST): UTC+2 (CEST)

Bovisasca is a district ("quartiere") of Milan, Italy, located within the Zone 9 administrative division of the city. It is located between the Ferrovie Nord railway and the Politecnico university buildings, adjacent to the district of Bovisa; it is named after the "Bovisasca" road leading to Bovisa.

== Urban environment ==
Much like Bovisa, Bovisasca is a former industrial district, now transformed into a mostly residential area. While Bovisa has been requalified through major public works such as the construction of new headquarters of the Politecnico university, Bovisasca is still in general condition of decay.

=== Social issues ===
Specifically, soil pollution issues related to arsenic waste from a former chemical plant have been repeatedly denounced both by local committees and ecology-related organizations and institutions, and informal slums of Romani nomads have developed in the last decades of the 20th century.
