= Garegnano =

Coordinates: 45°30′05″N 9°08′02″E

- Quartiere of Milan
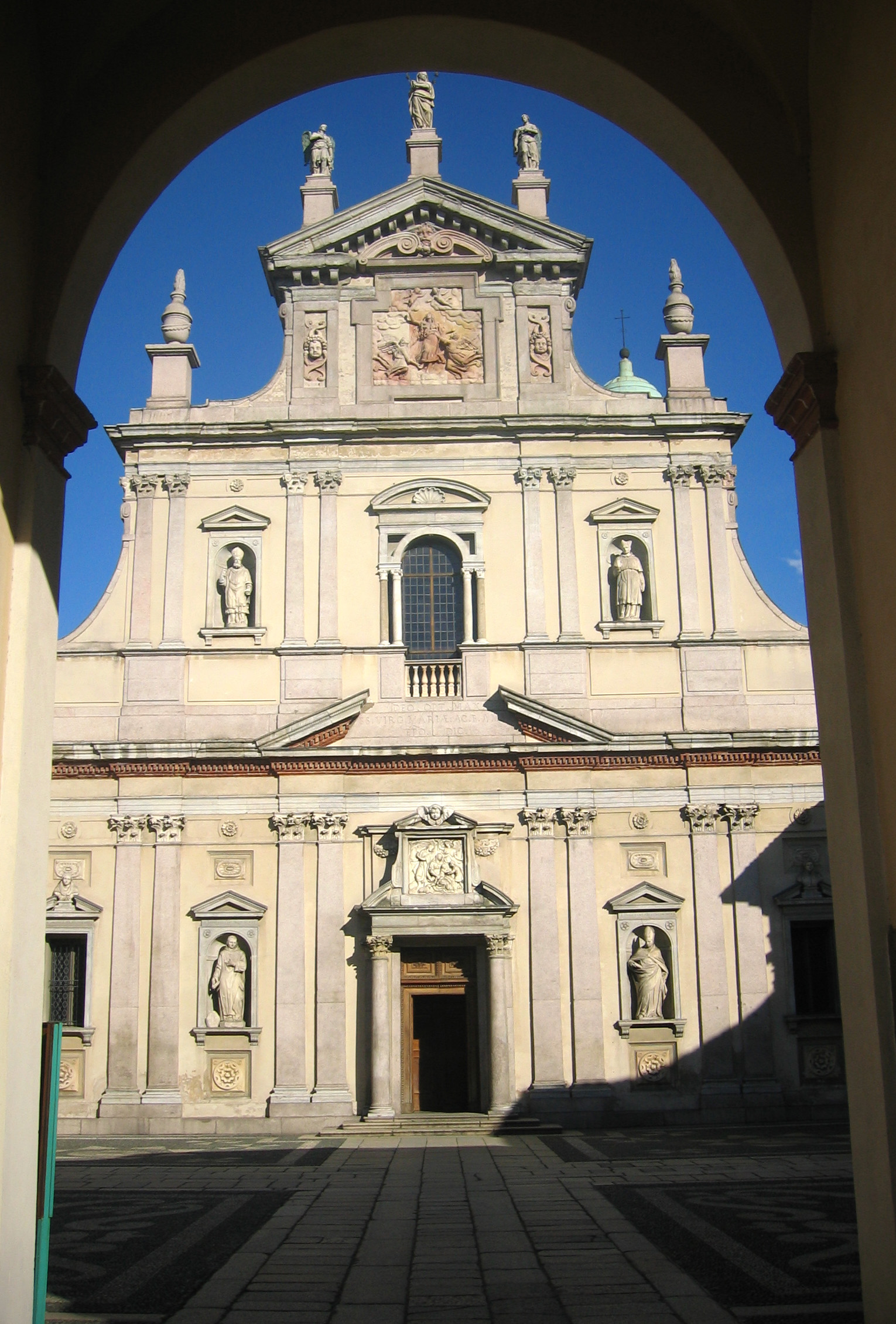
- The Garegnano Charterhouse
- Interactive map of Garegnano
- Country: Italy
- Region: Lombardy
- Province: Milan
- Comune: Milan
- Zone: 8
- Time zone: UTC+1 (CET)
  - Summer (DST): UTC+2 (CEST)

Garegnano is a district ("quartiere") of Milan, Italy, part of the Zone 8 administrative division of the city, north-west of the city centre. Before being annexed to Milan, it has been an autonomous comune, originally known as Garegnano Marcido.

The prominent landmark of the Garegnano district is the Garegnano Charterhouse, founded in 1349. The main street of the area is Viale Certosa (named after the Charterhouse, "Certosa" in Italian), which crosses the district from south-east to north-west, passing nearby the Charterhouse and ending up to the Cimitero Maggiore, Milan's largest cemetery. Viale Certosa is almost parallel to Via Gallaratese, which marks the boundary between Garegnano and the Gallaratese district. Viale Certosa is an important thoroughfare for Milanese traffic, as it is one of the access points to the Tangenziale ring road and to the motorways.

== History ==
The borgo of "Garegnano Marcido" dates back at least to the Middle Ages. In 1349, the eponymous charterhouse was built, a few hundreds meters west of the borgo. When the Milanese territory was subdivided in pieves, Garegnano was assigned to the pieve of Trenno. During Napoleonic rule it was briefly annexed to Milan (1809–1816), but regained its autonomy with the Kingdom of Lombardy–Venetia. In 1869, it was annexed to Musocco, which in turn became part of Milan in 1923.
