= Garegnano Charterhouse =

Former Carthusian monastery on the outskirts of Milan, Italy

Coordinates: 45°30′09″N 9°07′44″E

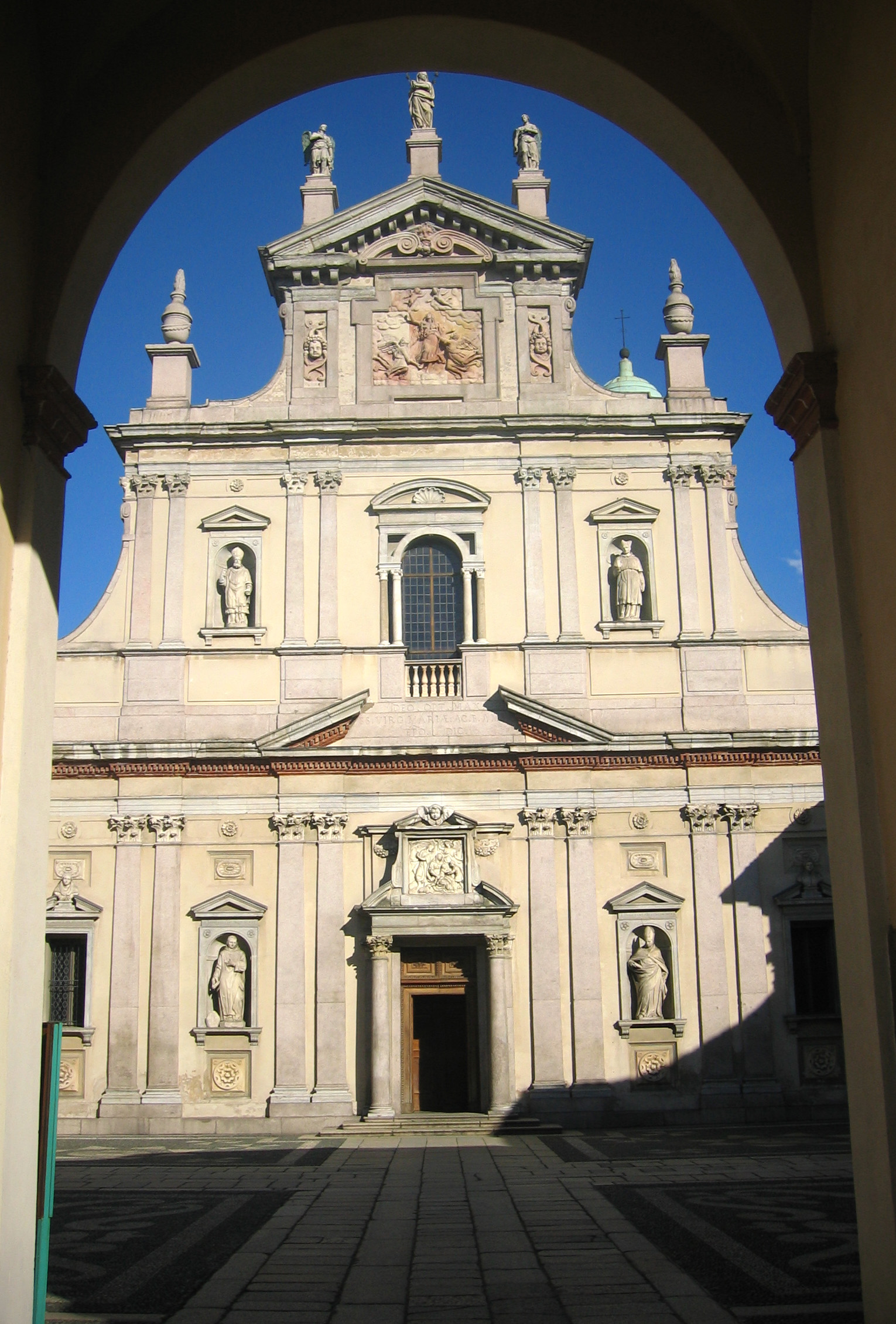
Façade of the charterhouse

Garegnano Charterhouse, also known as Milan Charterhouse (Italian: Certosa di Garegnano or Certosa di Milano) is a former Carthusian monastery, or charterhouse, located on the outskirts of Milan, Italy, in the Garegnano district. It now houses a community of Capuchin Friars.

== History ==
The monastery, dedicated to Saint Ambrose but also known as Our Lady of the Lamb of God, was founded in 1349 by Giovanni Visconti, bishop and lord of Milan. Soon after the foundation, monks from this monastery, with the patronage of Galeazzo Visconti, helped found the Certosa of Pavia.

It was then located some 4 kilometres from the walls of Milan. In the 14th century, it housed, among others, the poet Petrarch.

It was pillaged in 1449 when the Visconti dynasty fell. It was suppressed under the rationalist reforms of the Emperor Joseph II, Milan then being under Austrian rule, and became a parish church in 1782. In 1960 the surviving buildings and parochial duties were taken over by the Capuchin Friars. The present buildings date from the 16th and 17th centuries.

The main artworks include a cycle of frescos in the main church by Simone Peterzano (1578), il Genovesino, and Daniele Crespi (1629). There is a painting of San Brunone by Crespi. The chapter house contains, in the vault, a fresco of Saint Michael by Bernardo Zenale of the early 16th century.
