= Bollate =

Bollate Bollaa (Lombard)
- Comune
- Città di Bollate
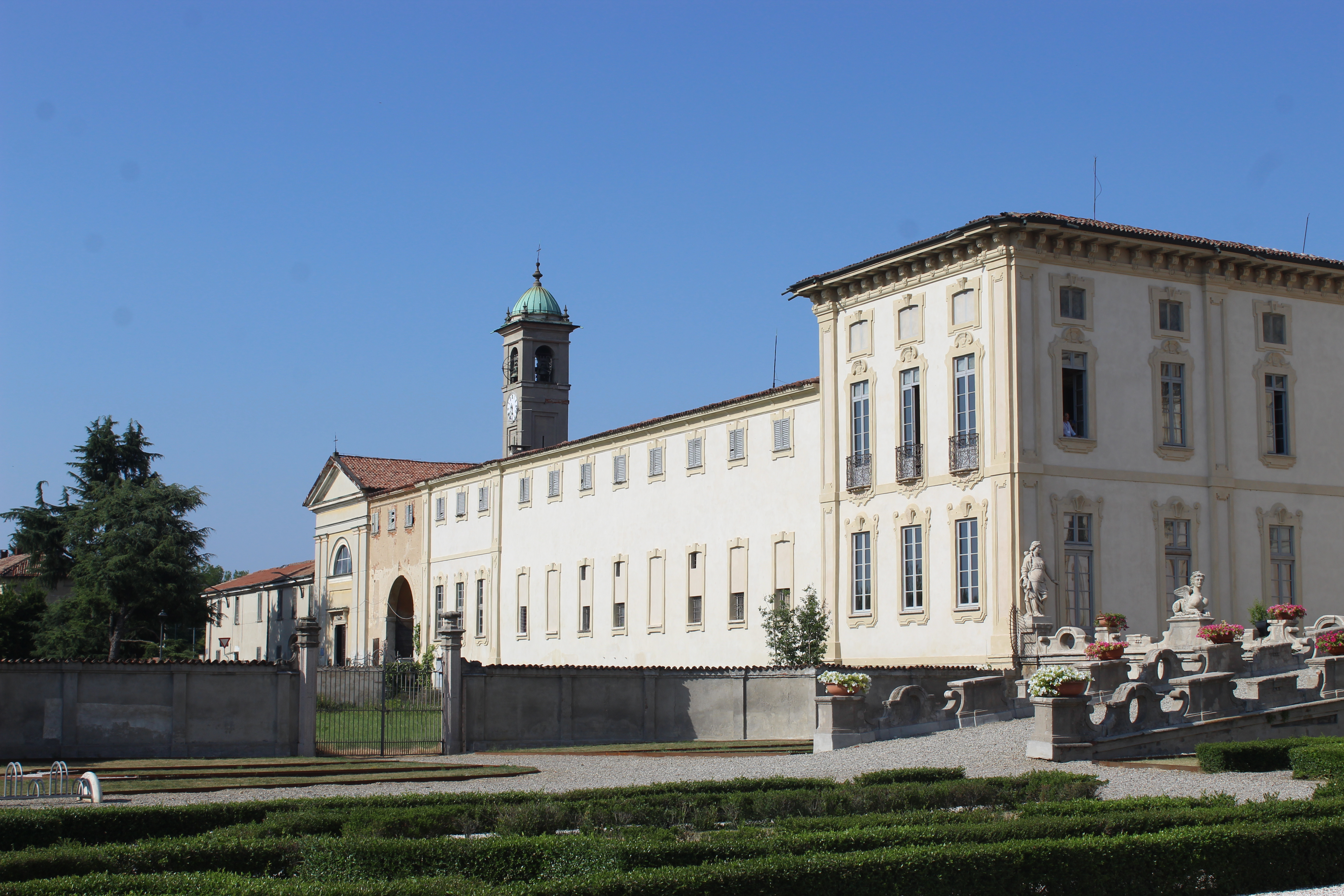

- Coat of arms

- Location within Italy Location within Lombardy
- Coordinates: 45°33′N 9°7′E
- Country: Italy
- Region: Lombardy
- Metropolitan city: Milan (MI)
- Frazioni: Cascina del Sole, Cassina Nuova, Castellazzo, Ospiate

Government
  - Mayor: Francesco Vassallo

Area
  - Total: 15.9 km^{2} (6.1 sq mi)
- Elevation: 156 m (512 ft)

Population (1-1-2017)
  - Total: 36,469
  - Density: 2,290/km^{2} (5,940/sq mi)
- Demonym: Bollatesi
- Time zone: UTC+1 (CET)
  - Summer (DST): UTC+2 (CEST)
- Postal code: 20021
- Dialing code: 02
- Website: Official website

Bollate (Milanese: Bollaa [buˈlaː]) is a comune (municipality) in the Metropolitan City of Milan in the Italian region Lombardy, located about 10 kilometres (6 mi) northwest of Milan.

As of 30 November 2017, it had a population of 36,488.

Bollate borders the following municipalities: Paderno Dugnano, Senago, Garbagnate Milanese, Arese, Cormano, Novate Milanese, Baranzate, Milan.

Bollate received the honorary title of city, with a presidential decree on 11 October 1984.

It is served by Bollate Centro railway station and Bollate Nord railway station. Sights include the historical Villa Arconati.
