= Arithmetices principia, nova methodo exposita =

Seminal mathematical work by Giuseppe Peano

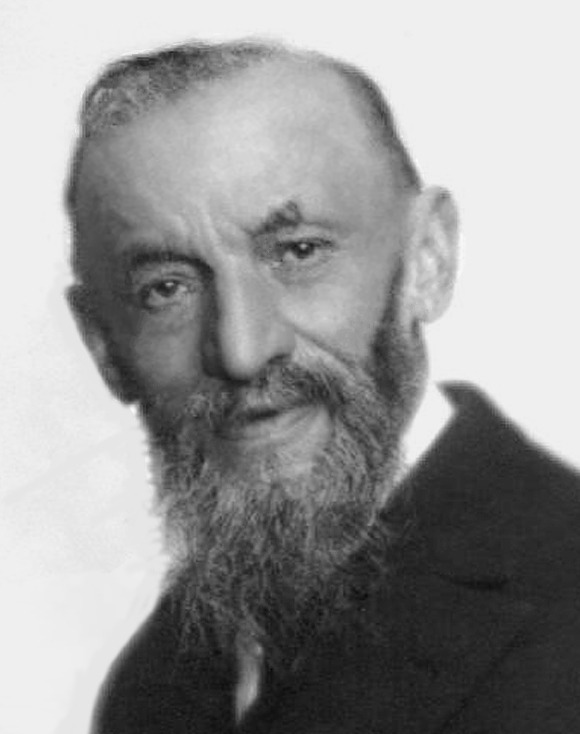
Giuseppe Peano

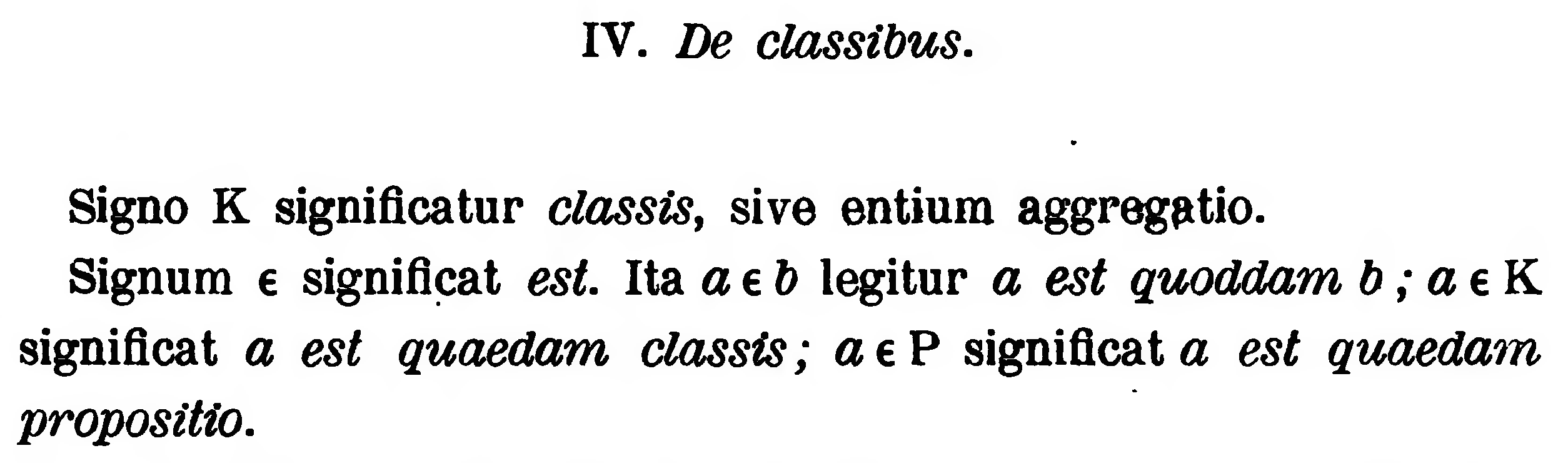
First recorded usage of the symbol ϵ for set membership.

The 1889 treatise Arithmetices principia, nova methodo exposita (The principles of arithmetic, presented by a new method) by Giuseppe Peano is widely considered to be a seminal document in mathematical logic and set theory, introducing what is now the standard axiomatization of the natural numbers, and known as the Peano axioms, as well as some pervasive notations, such as the symbols for the basic set operations ∈, ⊂, ∩, ∪, and A−B.

The treatise is written in Latin, which was already somewhat unusual at the time of publication, Latin having fallen out of favour as the lingua franca of scholarly communications by the end of the 19th century. The use of Latin in spite of this reflected Peano's belief in the universal importance of the work – which is now generally regarded as his most important contribution to arithmetic – and in that of universal communication. Peano later published works both in Latin and in his own artificial language, Latino sine flexione, which is a grammatically simplified version of Latin.

Peano also continued to publish mathematical notations in a series from 1895 to 1908 collectively known as Formulario mathematico.
