= Bashmakov =

Bashmakov (Russian: Башмаков, from башмак meaning shoe) is a Russian masculine surname, its feminine counterpart is Bashmakova. It may refer to

- Aleksandr Bashmakov (born 1950), Belarusian football coach
- Isabella Bashmakova (1921–2005), Russian historian of mathematics
