= Gramegna =

Gramegna may refer to:

- Giuseppe Gramegna (1898–1986), Italian communist politician
- Luigi Gramegna (1846–1928), Italian writer and historian
- Maria Gramegna (1887–1915), Italian mathematician
- Pierre Gramegna (born 1958), Luxembourgish diplomat and politician
- 37840 Gramegna, minor planet named after Maria Gramegna
