= Annibale Pastore =

Italian philosopher and logician

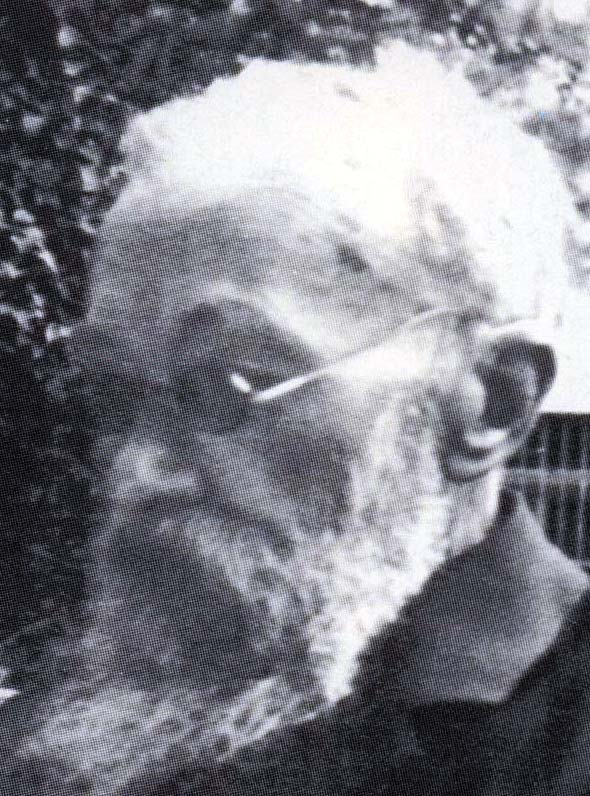
- Born: Valentino Annibale Pastore; 13 November 1868; Orbassano, Kingdom of Italy
- Died: 27 February 1956 (aged 87); Turin, Italy
- Occupations: Philosopher, logician

Academic background
- Education: University of Turin (Laurea in Literature, 1892; Laurea in Philosophy, 1903)
- Academic advisors: Pasquale d'Ercole; Antonio Garbasso; Arturo Graf; Friedrich Kiesow; Angelo Mosso; Giuseppe Peano

Academic work
- Institutions: University of Turin; University of Genoa
- Notable students: See list: Norberto Bobbio; Ludovico Geymonat; Antonio Gramsci; Luigi Pareyson

Valentino Annibale Pastore (13 November 1868 – 27 February 1956) was an Italian philosopher and logician.

== Life ==
Pastore was born in Orbassano.

He studied literature at the University of Turin under Arturo Graf. His thesis La vita delle forme letterarie (The life of literary forms) was published in 1892 in Turin. Pastore then turned to philosophy, influenced by the teaching of Pasquale d'Ercole, Friedrich Kiesow, Antonio Garbasso, and Giuseppe Peano, publishing his own thesis Sopra le teorie della scienza: logica, matematica, fisica (On the theories of science: logic, mathematics, physics) in 1903.

He was a professor in Turin from 1913 until 1939, leading a laboratory of "experimental logic". He eventually focused on logical aspects and procedures in science. His 1914-1915 seminary upon the concept of homo faber influenced Antonio Gramsci in his theories about the function of intellectuals in a capitalist society.

Pastore died in Turin.

== Works ==
- Sopra la teoria della scienza: Logica, matematica e fisica at the Internet Archive, 1903
- Logica formale dedotta dalla considerazione dei modelli meccanici at the Internet Archive, 1906
- Del nuovo spirito della scienza e della filosofia, 1907
- Sillogismo e proporzione, 1910
- Dell'essere e del conoscere, 1911
- Il pensiero puro, 1913
- Il problema della causalità, con particolare riguardo alla teoria del metodo sperimentale, 1921
- Il solipsismo, 1923
- La logica del potenziamento, 1936
- Logica sperimentale, 1939
- L'acrisia di Kant, 1940
- La filosofia di Lenin, 1946
- La volontà dell'assurdo. Storia e crisi dell'esistenzialismo, 1948
- Logicalia, 1957
- Dioniso, 1957
- Introduzione alla metafisica della poesia, 1957
