= Mathematical manuscripts of Karl Marx =

Collection of notes

The mathematical manuscripts of Karl Marx are a manuscript collection of Karl Marx's mathematical notes in which he attempted to derive the foundations of infinitesimal calculus from first principles.

In the 1968 edition, the first part of the collection is built around four texts: On the Concept of the Derived Function, On the Differential, On the History of Differential Calculus, and Taylor's Theorem, MacLaurin's Theorem, and Lagrange's Theory of Derived Functions, together with preliminary drafts and supplements. Only the first two are completed papers; Marx wrote them in 1881 and sent them to Engels. The third was never put into final form and survives only as drafts, and the fourth is represented only by extracts from a manuscript on Taylor's theorem and Lagrange's theory, material that Marx had intended to work into his history of the calculus but never did. These manuscripts attempt to construct a rigorous foundation for calculus and use historical materialism to analyse the history of mathematics.

Marx's contributions to mathematics had no immediate effect on the historical development of calculus, and he was unaware of many more recent developments in the field at the time, such as Cauchy's work on the foundations of the calculus. However, his work in some ways anticipated, but did not influence, some later developments in 20th century mathematics. These manuscripts, which are mostly from around 1873–1883, were partly published in Russian translation in 1933, and were first published in their original languages in 1968 in the Soviet Union, alongside a Russian translation. Since their publication, Marx's independent contributions to mathematics have been analysed in terms of both his own historical and economic theories, and in light of their potential applications of nonstandard analysis.

== Background ==
Marx's interest in mathematics arose from his work on political economy. In a letter to Engels of 11 January 1858 he wrote that, having been delayed by computational errors, he had undertaken "a quick scanning of the algebra", and on 6 July 1863 he wrote that "In my spare time I do differential and integral calculus".

== Contents ==
Marx left some 1,000 manuscript pages of mathematical notes on his attempts at discovering the foundations of calculus. In the 1968 edition, Marx's more or less finished manuscripts on the differential calculus, together with earlier drafts, form Part I; Part II consists of extracts from and comments on the mathematical books Marx had studied. Historian of science Kathryn Olesko writes that, by analogy with his understanding of the evolution of economics, Marx saw the historical development of calculus in terms of stages structured by mathematical symbols, which were altered only by force "in order to expose meaning and truth".

=== On the Concept of the Derived Function ===
Marx wrote On the Concept of the Derived Function in 1881, just two years before his death. In this work, he demonstrates the mechanical steps needed to calculate a derivative for several basic functions from first principles. Despite the fact that one of his sources had a strong geometric flavour, Marx's explanations rely much more strongly on algebraic explanations than geometric ones, suggesting he likely preferred to think of things algebraically. Fahey et al. state that although "We might be alarmed to find a student writing 0/0 ... [Marx] was well aware of what he was doing when he wrote '0/0'." However, Marx was evidently disturbed by the implications of this, stating that "The closely held belief of some rationalising mathematicians that dy and dx are quantitatively actually only infinitely small, only approaching 0/0, is a chimera". (Note: Marx's German (1968 edition, p. 32) reads festgehaltne Trost, literally "consolation held fast", which the English translation renders as "closely held belief". The words [ihr Verhältnis] ("their ratio") before "only approaching 0/0" are an editorial insertion in the 1968 edition and are omitted from the English.)

=== On the Differential ===
In On the Differential, Marx tries to construct the definition of a derivative dy/dx from first principles, without using the definition of a limit. He appears to have primarily used an elementary textbook written by the French mathematician Boucharlat, who had primarily used the traditional limit definition of the derivative, but Marx appears to have intentionally avoided doing so in his definition of the derivative.

Fahey et al. state that, as evidenced by the three earlier drafts of this paper, Marx wrote it with considerable care.

=== On the History of Differential Calculus ===
Fahey et al. state that although Marx did not state it explicitly, his historical manuscripts can be read as following a thesis, antithesis, synthesis model. Marx identified three historical phases of development: the "mystical" differential calculus of Newton and Leibniz, the "rational" differential calculus of d'Alembert, and the "purely algebraic" differential calculus of Lagrange. (Note: In Marx's own text, the section on the "rational" differential calculus discusses only d'Alembert, as does the editors' note on the manuscript. The editors' preface to the 1968 edition and Olesko also associate Euler with this stage.) However, as Marx was unaware of the work of Cauchy, he missed the work on placing calculus on a rigorous logical foundation after Lagrange.

=== Taylor's Theorem, MacLaurin's Theorem, and Lagrange's Theory of Derived Functions ===
In the 1968 edition, this part consists of extracts from two manuscripts: the one that gives the section its title, and an unfinished manuscript entitled Taylor's Theorem. According to the editors, there are two places in Marx's manuscript on the history of the calculus where he intended to insert a study of Taylor's and Maclaurin's theorems and a discussion of Lagrange's theory of analytic functions. He never did so, although he had collected a large amount of material for the purpose, most of it before he arrived at the view of the calculus set out in the papers he sent to Engels.

Marx opens the manuscript by stating that Newton's discovery of the binomial theorem revolutionised algebra by first making a general theory of equations possible, and that the binomial theorem is also the main basis of the differential calculus. He treats Maclaurin's theorem as a special case of Taylor's theorem, obtained by setting x = 0 in Taylor's expansion, and states that he will not consider it separately when he turns to Lagrange. He argues that the connections between the new calculus and the older algebra became clear only once the calculus had reached a finished form, which it did through the theorems of Taylor and Maclaurin, and that this is why it was Lagrange who first thought of reducing the calculus to a strictly algebraic basis. Lagrange, Marx writes, starts from an algebraic grounding of Taylor's theorem. Marx notes that Taylor's starting equation for f(x + h) is in no way proved, and that it assumes finite coefficients and whole, positive, ascending powers of h; the theorem is therefore inapplicable to functions that contradict these assumptions, which accounts for its so-called "failures". Lagrange grounds the equation algebraically and shows, through its development, which particular cases are excluded. Marx credits Lagrange with founding Taylor's theorem and the calculus in general on purely algebraic analysis and with introducing the concept of the derived function, but adds, in Kennedy's translation, that "All the ease and short cuts that differential calculus itself allows (Taylor's Theorem etc.) are thereby forfeited and very often replaced by operations of a much more lengthy and complicated nature". The editors write that Marx was at first much taken with Lagrange's method, but soon found that Lagrange's reduction of the calculus to algebra had not succeeded.

== Legacy ==
Gestern also endlich hab' ich mir die Courage gefaßt, auch ohne Hülfsbücher Deine mathematischen Mskr. durchzustudieren, und war froh zu sehn, daß ich die Bücher nicht nötig hatte. Ich mache Dir mein Kompliment dazu. Die Sache ist so sonnenklar, daß man sich wirklich nicht genug wundern kann, wie die Mathematiker so hartnäckig darauf bestehn, sie zu mystifizieren. Aber das kommt von der vereinseitigten Denkweise der Herren. $\mathrm{d}y/\mathrm{d}x$ resolut und ohne Umschweife $=0/0$ zu setzen, will ihnen nicht in den Schädel.

Yesterday I found the courage at last to study your mathematical manuscripts even without reference books, and I was pleased to find that I did not need them. I compliment you on your work. The thing is as clear as daylight, so that we cannot wonder enough at the way the mathematicians insist on mystifying it. But this comes from the one-sided way these gentlemen think. To put $\mathrm{d}y/\mathrm{d}x=0/0$, firmly and point-blank, does not enter their skulls. (Note: The English is the 1983 New Park translation, which does not render so hartnäckig ("so stubbornly"); Kennedy translates the clause as "how the mathematicians so stubbornly insist upon mystifying it".)

— Friedrich Engels, Letter from Engels to Marx, 18 August 1881 (Note: The 1983 New Park edition dates this letter 10 August 1881; the German edition of Marx and Engels's works, Kennedy and the notes to the 1968 edition give 18 August 1881.)

Olesko states that, contrary to both Engels and the editors of the 1983 English edition, Marx "did not solve the historical and conceptual riddle of the calculus". Mathematician Hubert Kennedy observes that Marx "seems to have been unaware of the advances being made by continental mathematicians in the foundations of differential calculus, including the work of Cauchy" and that although Marx's study of differentials had "no immediate effect on the historical development of mathematics", Engels' claim of "independent discoveries" made by Marx is "certainly justified" and that Marx's "operational definition of the differential anticipated 20th century developments in mathematics".

Joseph Dauben describes how, during the Cultural Revolution, some Chinese mathematicians linked Marx's manuscripts with nonstandard analysis, and states that as a result considerable interest in nonstandard analysis subsequently developed in China. After the Shanghai translations appeared in Dialectics of Nature, the journal received letters from a wide range of readers, among them a middle-school student in Beijing and workers in Shanghai and Qinghai, and published a selection of them debating, among other questions, whether the differential is zero.

== Editions and translations ==
Although Engels stated his intent to publish the "extremely important mathematical manuscripts left by Marx" in 1885, it was not until 1933 that parts of the manuscripts were published in Russian—for the journal Under the Banner of Marxism and collection Marxism and Natural Science (Марксизм и естествознание). A nearly complete edition in the original languages (mainly German), with a complete Russian translation, was published in 1968; it had been prepared under the direction of Sofya Yanovskaya. The first English translation, of Part I of the 1968 edition, was published in 1983.

In China, two groups prepared translations in the early 1970s. A group at Fudan University in Shanghai, working at first from a Japanese translation and later from the 1968 German–Russian edition, published translations of the essays on the derivative, the differential and the history of the calculus in two issues of the journal Dialectics of Nature in 1974, and the entire translation as a special issue of the Journal of Fudan University a year later. A group at Peking University, formed in January 1973, translated from the 1968 German–Russian edition; after the university obtained photocopies of Marx's original manuscripts from the Netherlands in 1974, the translation was checked and revised against the German original. Its edition was published by the People's Publishing House in July 1975, with photocopies of several pages of Marx's manuscripts and with German terms given in parentheses where new Chinese terminology was introduced.

- Marx, Karl (1968). Yanovskaya, S. A. (ed.). Математические рукописи [Mathematical Manuscripts] (in German and Russian). Moscow: Nauka.
- Marx, Karl (1983). Mathematical Manuscripts of Karl Marx. Translated by Charles Aronson; Michael Meo. London: New Park Publications. ISBN 978-0-86151-000-9.
- Marx, Karl (2018). Karl Marx: Mathematical Manuscripts. Translated by Baksi, Pradip (2nd revised ed.). Delhi: Aakar Books. ISBN 978-93-5002-562-8.
- Marx, Karl (1985). Alcouffe, Alain (ed.). Les manuscrits mathématiques de Marx (in French). Paris: Economica. ISBN 978-2-7178-0864-3.
- Marx, Karl (December 1949). Sūgaku ni kansuru ikō 數學に關する遺稿 [Posthumous Writings on Mathematics] (in Japanese). Translated by 玉木英彦; 今野武雄. Tokyo: Iwanami Shoten.
- Marx, Karl (1973-04-27). Sūgaku shukō 数学手稿 [Mathematical Manuscripts] (in Japanese). Translated by 菅原仰. Tokyo: Ōtsuki Shoten. ISBN 978-4-272-44001-6.
- Marx, Karl (July 1975). Shùxué shǒugǎo 数学手稿 [Mathematical Manuscripts] (in Chinese). 北京大学《数学手稿》编译组编译. Beijing: 人民出版社. 书号 1001·942.
