= Peano–Russell notation =

Notation used in mathematical logic

In mathematical logic, Peano–Russell notation was Bertrand Russell's application of Giuseppe Peano's logical notation to the logical notions of Frege and was used in the writing of Principia Mathematica in collaboration with Alfred North Whitehead:

"The notation adopted in the present work is based upon that of Peano, and the following explanations are to some extent modelled on those which he prefixes to his Formulario Mathematico." (Chapter I: Preliminary Explanations of Ideas and Notations, page 4)

== Variables ==
In the notation, variables are ambiguous in denotation, preserve a recognizable identity appearing in various places in logical statements within a given context, and have a range of possible determination between any two variables which is the same or different. When the possible determination is the same for both variables, then one implies the other; otherwise, the possible determination of one given to the other produces a meaningless phrase. The alphabetic symbol set for variables includes the lower and upper case Roman letters as well as many from the Greek alphabet.

== Fundamental functions of propositions ==
The four fundamental functions are the contradictory function, the logical sum, the logical product, and the implicative function.

=== Contradictory function ===
The contradictory function applied to a proposition returns its negation.

$$\sim p$$

=== Logical sum ===
The logical sum applied to two propositions returns their disjunction.

$$p \lor q$$

=== Logical product ===
The logical product applied to two propositions returns the truth-value of both propositions being simultaneously true.

$$p \cdot q$$

=== Implicative function ===
The implicative function applied to two ordered propositions returns the truth value of the first implying the second proposition.

$$p \supset q$$

== More complex functions of propositions ==
Equivalence is written as $p \equiv q$, standing for $p \supset q \cdot q \supset p$.

Assertion is same as the making of a statement between two full stops.

$$\vdash p$$

An asserted proposition is either true or an error on the part of the writer.

Inference is equivalent to the rule modus ponens, where $p \cdot p \supset q . \supset q$

In addition to the logical product, dots are also used to show groupings of functions of propositions. In the above example, the dot before the final implication function symbol groups all of the previous functions on that line together as the antecedent to the final consequent.

The notation includes definitions as complex functions of propositions, using the equals sign "=" to separate the defined term from its symbolic definition, ending with the letters "Df".
