= Anthony Baldinucci =

Italian Jesuit priest (1665–1717)

Blessed Anthony Baldinucci, S.J.
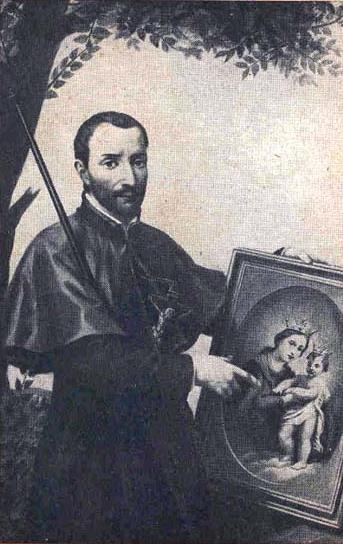
- An engraving of Baldinucci, with his miraculous Refugium Peccatorum Madonna
- Born: 19 June 1665; Florence, Grand Duchy of Tuscany
- Died: 7 November 1717 (aged 52); Pofi, Lazio, Papal States
- Venerated in: Roman Catholic Church (Society of Jesus)
- Beatified: April 23, 1893 by Pope Leo XIII
- Feast: 7 November
- Attributes: depicted with a miraculous Refugium Peccatorum image of the Virgin Mary
- Patronage: epidemics

Anthony Baldinucci, S.J. (June 19, 1665 – November 7, 1717), was an Italian Jesuit priest and missionary, best known for his unusual methods of conducting missions.

== Life ==
Baldinucci was born in Florence, the son of the art historian and biographer Filippo Baldinucci. He attended the Jesuit school of Florence and was drawn to the priesthood. Initially he considered following his older brother into the Dominican Order, but he entered the novitiate of the Society of Jesus on April 21, 1681, and was ordained as a priest on October 28, 1695. He was then sent to study theology at the Roman College. He carried out his regency teaching at the Jesuit schools in Terni and Rome. He was admitted to the fourth vow of the Society on 15 August 1698.

Baldinucci had wanted to become a missionary in Asia, but his poor health kept him from that path. Instead, he worked in central Italy, specifically in the cities of Frascati and Viterbo. He would continue to work in this area for the rest of his life. For four months of every year he would conduct missions. Between 1697 and 1717, he visited 30 dioceses and gave an average of 22 missions per year. The missions were generally centered on meditations from the Spiritual Exercises of Ignatius of Loyola.

Baldinucci’s preaching was simple, vivid and dramatic. He organized processions which would start from various areas of the country to the place where he was holding the mission. Many of the people in these processions would wear crowns of thorns and scourge themselves. Given the size of these processions, Baldinucci often employed a number of laymen (whom he called deputati) to help manage the crowd. Many of these "deputati" were drawn from the people he thought might otherwise be tempted to disrupt the processions.

Baldinucci himself walked barefoot to each mission assignment, often carried a cross during his preaching, and often wore heavy chains. He would also walk through the assembled people scourging himself to the point of drawing blood and beyond. He would often finish these missions with the burning of various possible instruments of vice, including cards, dice, musical instruments, and the like, in the public square. People were reported to also lay their daggers and pistols at his feet at this time. His appearances were so popular and well attended that he often found crowds covering the walls of city when he arrived to deliver a mission.

Baldinucci had a particular devotion to the Virgin Mary, and made sure that a copy of miraculous picture of her as the Refuge of Sinners from the Church of the Gesu (Frascati) was carried with him in his travels. He also worked diligently to spread Marian devotions in his travels.

In addition to his preaching, Baldinucci also wrote two courses of sermons for Lent, gathered material for many more, composed a number of discourses, and maintained a long correspondence list.

After suffering from a myocardial infarction in the course of one of his preaching tours, brought on by fatigue, Baldinucci died in the village of Pofi, in the ancient region of Lazio, then part of the Papal States.

== Veneration ==
The process leading to Baldinucci's beatification began in 1753. He was declared Venerable in 1873, and was beatified on March 25, 1893. The cause for his canonization was opened on April 3, 1950.

The Jesuit Church of Our Lady of Good Counsel in Florence still preserves the crucifix he wore during his missions.
