= Latino sine flexione =

Latin-based international auxiliary language

- Interlingua
- IL de A.p.I.
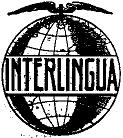
- Interlingua sign in 1911
- Pronunciation: [laˈtino ˈsine fleksiˈone]
- Created by: Academia pro Interlingua under chairmanship of Giuseppe Peano
- Date: 1887–1914
- Setting and usage: International auxiliary language
- Purpose: Constructed language: Italic, Auxiliary language; Latino-Faliscan, A posteriori language; Latin, Controlled language; Latino sine flexione
- Early form: Neo-Latin
- Writing system: Latin alphabet
- Sources: Based on Latin, but influenced by ideas in other auxiliary languages

Official status
- Regulated by: Academia pro Interlingua (–1945), works by Peano and ApI (eg Discussiones 1909–1915)

Language codes
- ISO 639-3: ilc (rejected)
- Glottolog: None
- IETF: la-peano

Latino sine flexione ("Latin without inflections"), Interlingua de Academia pro Interlingua (IL de ApI) or Peano's Interlingua (abbreviated as IL) is an international auxiliary language compiled by the Academia pro Interlingua under the chairmanship of the Italian mathematician Giuseppe Peano (1858–1932) from 1887 until 1914. It is a simplified version of Latin, and retains its vocabulary.

Interlingua-IL was described in the journal Revue de Mathématiques in an article of 1903 entitled De Latino Sine Flexione, Lingua Auxiliare Internationale (meaning On Latin Without Inflection, International Auxiliary Language), which explained the reason for its creation. The article argued that other auxiliary languages were unnecessary, since Latin was already established as the world's international language. The article was written in classical Latin, but it gradually dropped its inflections until there were none.

Language codes ISO 639: ISO 639-2 and -1 were requested on 23 July 2017 at the Library of Congress (proposed: IL and ILA); ISO-639-3 was requested on 10 August 2017 at SIL (proposed: ILC) and was rejected on 23 January 2018.

== History ==
In 1903, Peano published the article De Latino Sine Flexione to introduce his language. In this work, Peano quoted a series of suggestions by Leibniz about a simplified form of Latin. The article appeared to be a serious development of the idea, and Peano subsequently gained a reputation among the auxiliary language movement.

In 1904, Peano undertook an essay about the way to obtain the minimal grammar of an eventual minimal Latin (Latino minimo), with a minimal vocabulary purely international.

Peano and some colleagues published articles in Latino sine flexione for several years at the Revue de Mathématiques. Because of his desire to prove that this was indeed an international language, Peano boldly published the final edition of his famous Formulario mathematico in Latino sine flexione. However, as Hubert Kennedy notes, most mathematicians were put off by the artificial appearance of the language, and made no attempt to read it.

In October 1907, Peano was at the Collège de France in Paris to take part in the Delegation for the Adoption of an International Auxiliary Language. Having declared for Latino sine flexione to be adopted, he eventually could not participate in the final voting, because of labour affairs at Turin.

On 26 December 1908, Peano was elected member and director of the Akademi internasional de lingu universal still using Idiom Neutral, which was refounded one year later under the name Academia pro Interlingua. Every academician might use their favourite form of Interlingua, the term being initially used in a general sense as a synonym for international language, yet it soon began to be specially used to denote a reformed Latino sine flexione based on the common rules the academicians were reaching by frequent votings. Thus, the name Interlingua soon began to denote the language evolving from the Academia Pro Interlingua, with the corresponding abbreviation IL.

However, every member was free to write in their own personal style, and indeed some members were proposing radical reforms which eventually might end up as independent languages (like Michaux's Romanal or De Wahl's Interlingue). For this reason, the name Peano's Interlingua or Interlingua (IL) might be regarded as the most accurate for the particular standard by Peano. (As found in "Interglossa and its predecessors".)

The discussions to reach a standard Interlingua may be seen on the pages of Discussiones, the official journal of the Academia pro Interlingua from 1909 to 1913. This and subsequent journals of the academy have been recently published in a CD-Rom by the mathematics department of the University of Turin, the place where Peano developed his teaching and research.

Since De Latino Sine Flexione had set the principle to take Latin nouns either in the ablative or nominative form (nomen was preferred to nomine), in 1909 Peano published a vocabulary in order to assist in selecting the proper form of every noun, yet an essential value of Peano's Interlingua was that the lexicon might be found straightforwardly in any Latin dictionary (by getting the thematic vowel of the stem from the genitive ending, that is: -a -o -e -u -e from -ae -i -is -us -ei). Finally, a large vocabulary with 14,000 words was published in 1915.

A reformed Interlingua was presented in 1951 by Alexander Gode as the last director of the International Auxiliary Language Association. It was claimed to be independent from Peano's Interlingua, because it had developed a new method to detect the most recent common prototypes. But that method usually leads to the Latin ablative, so most vocabulary of Peano's Interlingua would be kept. Accordingly, the very name Interlingua was kept, yet a distinct abbreviation was adopted: IA instead of IL.

== Alphabet and pronunciation ==
Interlingua alphabet and digraphs, with typical pronunciations
Upper case	A	Ae	B	C	Ch	D	E	F	G	H	I	J	K	L	M	N	O	Oe	P	Ph	Qu	R	Rh	S	T	Th	U	V	W	X	Y	Z
Lower case	a	ae	b	c	ch	d	e	f	g	h	i	j	k	l	m	n	o	oe	p	ph	qu	r	rh	s	t	th	u	v	w	x	y	z
Distinct pronunciations (IPA)	a	ai̯	b, p	k	kʰ	d	e	f	ɡ	h	i	j	k	l	m	n	o	oi̯	p	pʰ	kʷ	r		s	t	tʰ	u	w	w	ks	y	z
Merged pronunciations	a	e	b, p	k	k	d	e	f	ɡ	-	i	j	k	l	m	n	o	e	p	p, f	kʷ	r		s	t	t	u	v	v	ks	i	z

According to Peano's guide to the language in 1931, "most Interlinguists are in favour of the old Latin pronunciation." This gives the pronunciation of vowels as follows:

- a—as in father: [a]
- e—as in they: [e]
- i—as in feet: [i]
- o—as in tone: [o]
- u—as in rule: [u]
- y—as French u: [y]
- j—as in yes: [j]
- ae—as in eye: [ai̯]
- oe—as in boy: [oi̯]

Consonants are pronounced largely as in English, with the following clarifications:

- b—like English b, but like p if followed by s or t: [b, p]
- g—like g in go, get: [ɡ]
- h—silent in rh otherwise like English h: [h]
- qu—as qu in quarrel: [kʷ]
- r—as in correct (trilled): [r]
- v—like English w.: [w]
- x—as ks.: [ks]
- ch, ph, th—as c, p, t in can, pan, tan: [kʰ, pʰ, tʰ]
- c—like k always, as in scan, scat: [k] (not aspirated)
- p—as in span
- t—as in stand

Not all consonants and vowels are pronounced distinctively by all people. The following variant pronunciations are allowed:

- y as ⟨i⟩
- ae and oe as ⟨e⟩
- h silent
- ch, ph, th as ⟨c, p, t⟩
- ph as ⟨f⟩
- v like English v, [v]
- w like English v

The stress is based on the classical Latin rule:

- Words with two syllables have the stress on the penult.
- Words with three or more syllables have the stress on the penult only if it is heavy (closed or had a long vowel in Classical Latin), otherwise on the antepenult (p. xii).

A secondary accent may be placed when necessary as the speaker deems appropriate.

== Parts of speech ==
Though Peano removed the inflections of Latin from nouns and adjectives, he did not entirely remove grammatical gender, permitting the option of a feminine ending for occupations. The gender of animals is immutable. All forms of nouns end with a vowel and are taken from the ablative case, but as this was not listed in most Latin dictionaries, he gave the rule for its derivation from the genitive case. The plural is not required when not necessary, such as when a number has been specified, the plural can be read from the context, and so on; however, Peano gives the option of using the suffix -s to indicate it when needed. Verbs have few inflections of conjugation; tenses and moods are instead indicated by verb adjuncts. The result is a change to a positional language.

=== Particles ===
Particles that have no inflection in classical Latin are used in their natural form:

- Supra, infra, intra, extra... (but superiore, inferiore, interiore, exteriore from superior, -oris and so on.)
- Super, subter, inter, praeter, semper... (but nostro, vestro, dextro... from noster, -tra, -trum and so on.)
- Tres, quattuor, quinque, sex, septem, octo, novem, decem... (but uno from unus, -a, -um; duo from duo, -ae, -o; nullo from nullus, -a, -um; multo from multus, -a, -um, etc.)

=== Nouns ===
The form of nouns depends on the Latin declensions.

Latin declension number (genitive ending)	1: -ae	2: -i	3: -is	4: -us	5: -ei
Latino ending	-a	-o	-e	-u	-e

Latin declension/nominative form	Latin genitive	Latino (Latin ablative)	English
1st: rosa	rosae	rosa	rose
2nd: laurus	lauri	lauro	laurel
3rd: pax	pacis	pace	peace
4th: casus	casus	casu	case
5th: series	seriei	serie	series

Those proper nouns written with the Roman alphabet are kept as close to the original as possible. The following are examples: München, New York, Roma, Giovanni.

=== Pronouns ===
- Personal

Number	Singular	Plural
1st person	me	nos
2nd person	te	vos
3rd person	illo (male), illa (female), id (neutral)	illos
Reflexive	se	se

- Demonstrative: illo (that, as in "that book"), isto (this, as in "this book"), ipso (itself); for conjunction: que (me vide que illo es rapide = I see that it is fast)
- Possessive: meo, tuo, suo, nostro, vestro, (suo)
- Relative and conjunctive: qui (who, that human), quod (which, that thing)
- Reflexive: se
- Indefinitive: un, uno (One tells...), ullo (any), omne or omni (all, each, every), aliquo (anyone), nullo (nothing), nemo (no one)

=== Verbs ===
Verbs are formed from the Latin by dropping the final -re of the infinitive. Tense, mood, etc., are indicated by particles, auxiliary verbs, or adverbs, but none is required if the sense is clear from the context. If needed, the past may be indicated by preceding the verb with e, and the future with i.

There are specific endings to create the infinitive and participles:

- Basic form: ama (loves)
- Infinitive: amare (to love)
- Passive participle: amato (loved)
- Active participle: amante (loving)

==== Collateral endings ====
- Imperfectum (past): amaba (loved), legeba (read)
- Future: amarà (will/shall love), legerà (will/shall read)
- Conditional: amarè (would love), legerè (would read)

The endings -rà and -rè are stressed.

==== Compound tenses ====
Composite tenses can be expressed with auxiliary words:

- Praeteritum: habe amato (have loved)
- Future: debe amare / vol amare / habe ad amare (must love / will love / have to love)
- Continuous tenses: me es scribente (I am writing)

=== Adjectives and adverbs ===
Adjectives are formed as follows:

- If the nominative neuter ends with -e, the Latino form is unchanged.
- If the nominative neuter ends with -um, the Latino form is changed to -o: novum > novo (new).
- In all other cases, adjectives are formed with the ablative case from the genitive, as is the case with nouns.

Adjectives can be used as adverbs if the context is clear, or cum mente or in modo can be used:

- Diligente (diligent): Cum mente diligente, cum diligente mente, in modo diligente, in diligente modo = diligently.

==== Comparative and superlative ====
- Positive: illo es tam habile quam te (he is as handy as you)
- Comparative: illo es magis habile quam te or illo es plus habile quam te (he is handier than you) and illo es minus habile quam te (he is less handy than you)
- Superlative: maxim de... and minim de...

==== Irregularities ====
- Bono: meliore: optimo
- Malo: pejore: pessimo
- Magno: majore: maximo
- Parvo: minore: minimo

=== Articles ===
As with Latin, neither the definite nor the indefinite article exists in Latino sine flexione. When necessary they may be translated with pronouns or words such as illo (it, that), isto or hoc (this), or uno (one):

- Da ad me libro = give me (the) book
- Da ad me hoc (isto) libro = give me this book
- Da ad me illo libro = give me that book
- Da ad me uno libro = give me a book
- Da ad me illo meo libro = give me that book of mine
- Da ad me uno meo libro = give me a book of mine

=== Numerals ===
- Cardinals: 1 uno, 2 duo, 3 tres, 4 quatuor, 5 quinque, 6 sex, 7 septem, 8 octo, 9 novem, 10 decem, 20 viginti, 30 triginta, 40 quadraginta, 50 quinquaginta, 60 sexaginta, 70 septuaginta, 80 octoginta, 90 nonaginta, 100 centum, 1,000 mille, 1,000,000 millione
- Cardinals (cont.): 11 decem-uno, 12 decem-duo, 19 decem-novem, 21 viginti-uno, 101 centum (et) uno, 102 centum (et) duo, 200 duo cento, 300 tres cento
- Ordinals: 1° primo, 2° secundo, 3° tertio, 4° quarto, 5° quinto, 6° sexto, 7° septimo, 8° octavo, 9° nono, 10° decimo, 20° vigesimo, 30° trigesimo, 40° quadragesimo, 50° quinquagesimo, 60° sexagesimo, 70° septuagesimo, 80° octogesimo, 90° nonagesimo, 100° centesimo, 1,000° millesimo, 1,000,000 millionesimo
- Ordinals (cont.): 45° quadragesimo quinto or quadraginta quinto, 58° quinquagesimo octavo or quinquaginta octavo, 345° tres cento quadraginta quinto
- Multiplicatives: uno vice (once), duo vice (twice), tres vice (three times)

== Language examples ==
Latino es lingua internationale in occidente de Europa ab tempore de imperio romano, per toto medio aevo, et in scientia usque ultimo seculo. Seculo vigesimo es primo que non habe lingua commune. Hodie quasi omne auctore scribe in proprio lingua nationale, id es in plure lingua neo-latino, in plure germanico, in plure slavo, in nipponico et alio. Tale multitudine de linguas in labores de interesse commune ad toto humanitate constitute magno obstaculo ad progressu.

— Latin was the international language in the west of Europe from the time of the Roman Empire, throughout the Middle Ages, and in the sciences until the last century. The 20th century is the first that does not have a common language. Today almost all authors write in their own national languages, that is in Neo-Latin languages, in Germanic, in Slavic, in Japanese, and others. This multitude of languages in works of communal interest to the whole of humanity constitutes a large obstacle to progress.

The Lord's Prayer
Latino sine flexione version:

Nostro patre, qui es in caelos,
que tuo nomine fi sanctificato;
que tuo regno adveni;
que tuo voluntate es facto
sicut in caelo et in terra.
Da hodie ad nos nostro pane quotidiano,
et remitte ad nos nostro debitos,
sicut et nos remitte ad nostro debitores.
Et non induce nos in tentatione,
sed libera nos ab malo.
Amen.

Interlingua version

Patre nostre, qui es in le celos,
que tu nomine sia sanctificate;
que tu regno veni;
que tu voluntate sia facite
como in le celo, etiam super le terra.
Da nos hodie nostre pan quotidian,
e pardona a nos nostre debitas
como etiam nos los pardona a nostre debitores.
E non induce nos in tentation,
sed libera nos del mal.
Amen.

Latin version:

Pater noster, qui es in caelis,
sanctificetur nomen tuum.
Adveniat regnum tuum.
Fiat voluntas tua,
sicut in caelo, et in terra.
Panem nostrum quotidianum da nobis hodie,
et dimitte nobis debita nostra,
sicut et nos dimittimus debitoribus nostris.
Et ne nos inducas in tentationem,
sed libera nos a malo.
Amen.

English (ELLC - 1988)

Our Father (who are) in heaven,
hallowed be your name,
your kingdom come,
your will be done,
on earth as in heaven.
Give us today our daily bread.
Forgive us our sins
as we forgive those who sin against us.
Save us from the time of trial
and deliver us from evil.
Amen.

Latin proverbs converted to Latino sine flexione
Latin	Latino sine flexione	English
Vox populi, vox Dei.	Voce de populo, voce de Deo.	The voice of the people is the voice of God.
Hodie mihi, cras tibi.	Hodie ad me, cras ad te.	It is my lot today, yours to-morrow.
Gratia gratiam generat, lis litem.	Gratia genera gratia, lite genera lite.	Goodwill begets goodwill, bickering begets bickering.
In medio stat virtus.	Virtute sta in medio.	Virtue stands in the middle.
Qui non laborat, non manducet.	Qui non labora, non debe manducare.	He who does not work, neither shall he eat.
Medice, cura te ipsum.	Medico, cura te ipso.	Physician, heal thyself.
De gustibus non est disputandum.	Nos non debe disputare de gustu.	There is no disputing about tastes.
Ars imitatio naturae est.	Arte imita natura.	Art imitates nature.
Do ut des.	Me da ut te da.	I give so that you give.
Designatio unius est exclusio alterius.	Qui designa uno, exclude alio.	Who chooses one excludes another.

Publius Cornelius Tacitus, De origine et situ Germanorum (Germania) (fragmentum initiale)
Latina classica (ex Vicifonte)	Latino sine flexione / Interlingua (IL) de A.p.I.	English (translated by A.J. Church and W.J. Brodribb, 1876)
Germania omnis a Gallis Raetisque et Pannoniis Rheno et Danuvio fluminibus, a Sarmatis Dacisque mutuo metu aut montibus separatur: cetera Oceanus ambit, latos sinus et insularum inmensa spatia complectens, nuper cognitis quibusdam gentibus ac regibus, quos bellum aperuit. Rhenus, Raeticarum Alpium inaccesso ac praecipiti vertice ortus, modico flexu in occidentem versus septentrionali Oceano miscetur. Danuvius molli et clementer edito montis Abnobae iugo effusus pluris populos adit, donec in Ponticum mare sex meatibus erumpat: septimum os paludibus hauritur.	Fluvios Rheno et Danuvio separa toto Germania ab Gallos, Raetos et Pannonios; montes, aut metu mutuo, separa illo ab Sarmatas et Dacos: Oceano ambi ceteros, complectente sinus lato de mari et spatios immenso de insulas, ad certo gentes et reges recente cognito, aperto ab bello. Rheno, orto in vertice inaccesso et praecipite de Alpes Raetico, flecte se parvo versus occidente et misce se in Oceano septentrionale. Danuvio, effuso in jugo molle et clemente edito de monte Abnoba, visita plure populo, usque illo erumpe in mari Pontico per sex cursu: ore septimo perde se in paludes.	Germany as a whole is separated from the Galli, the Rhaeti, and Pannonii, by the rivers Rhine and Danube; mountain ranges, or the fear which each feels for the other, divide it from the Sarmatae and Daci. Elsewhere ocean girds it, embracing broad peninsulas and islands of unexplored extent, where certain tribes and kings are newly known to us, revealed by war. The Rhine springs from a precipitous and inaccessible height of the Rhaetian Alps, bends slightly westward, and mingles with the Northern Ocean. The Danube pours down from the gradual and gently rising slope of Mount Abnoba, and visits many nations, to force its way at last through six channels into the Pontus; a seventh mouth is lost in marshes.

== Criticism ==
Peano formally defended the maxim that the best grammar is no grammar, bearing in mind the example of Chinese. (In modern linguistics, counter to popular and Peano's usage, grammar does not refer to morphological structures alone, but also to syntax and phonology, for example, which both Latino sine flexione and Chinese still have. In this sense, "languages without grammar" cannot exist.) According to Lancelot Hogben, Peano's Interlingua still shares a major flaw with many other auxiliary languages, having "either too much grammar of the wrong sort, or not enough of the right". (p. 10) Hogben argues that at least nouns and verbs should be easily distinguished by characteristic endings so that one can easily get an initial understanding of the sentence. Thus, in Peano's Interlingua, the verbs might be given some specific, standardized verbal form, such as the infinitive, which is sufficient in the Latin indirect speech. Instead, the raw imperative is proposed in De Latino Sine Flexione:

Lingua latino habet discurso directo, ut: "Amicitia inter malos esse non potest", et discurso indirecto: "(Verum est ) amicitiam inter malos esse non posse". Si nos utimur semper de discurso indirecto, in verbo evanescit desinentia de persona, de modo, et saepe de tempore. Sumimus ergo nomen inflexibile (...), sub forma magis simplice, qui es imperativo.

— [Translation: ] The Latin language has a direct discourse, like: "Friendness among the bad ones is not possible", and indirect discourse: "(It is true that ) friendness among the bad ones is not possible". If we always make use of indirect discourse, the desinences of person, mode, and (frequently) time, get vanished off the verb. So we take the name unflexed (...), under the simplest form, which is the imperative., Peano (1903, § 4)

According to Hogben, another handicap is the lack of a pure article, which might clearly indicate the nouns. Nevertheless, Peano occasionally suggested that illo (that) and uno (one) might be used as articles.

Once more according to Hogben, the syntax of Peano's Interlingua remained conservative:

[Peano's Interlingua] (...) has an aristocratic indifference to the necessity for simple rules of sentence-construction. The fact is that no pioneer of language-planning –least of all Peano– has undertaken the task of investigating what rules of word-order contribute most to intrinsic clarity of meaning and ease of recognition.

— Lancelot Hogben (1943, p. 11).

Reviewing the list of more widely known Latin titles, one might conclude that the sequence noun-adjective is the norm in Latin, yet the inverted sequence is also current. The ratio is over 2 to 1 in a list of Latin titles commented by Stroh. E.g. "Principia Mathematica". As for a sequence nominative-genitive, it may be the norm in Latin in a similar ratio. E.g. "Systema Naturae". Indeed, the sequence nominative-genitive must always be the norm in Peano's Interlingua, since the preposition de must introduce the genitive. Thus, Philosophiæ Naturalis Principia Mathematica would turn into Principio Mathematico de Philosophia Naturale. Since the function of both the adjective and the genitive is often the same, one might infer that the sequence noun-adjective might always be the norm.

Adiectivo qui deriva ab sustantivo vale genitivo: "aureo", "de auro".

— [Translation: ] An adjective derived from a substantive is equivalent to a genitive: "golden", "of gold"., Peano (1903, § 6).

== See also ==
- Interslavic
