= Refugium Peccatorum Madonna (Crosio) =

Painting by Luigi Crosio

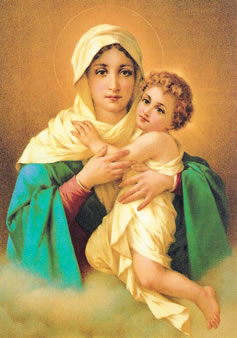
Refuge of Sinners Madonna, Luigi Crosio, 1898

Refugium Peccatorum Madonna or the Refuge of Sinners Madonna is a painting by the Italian artist Luigi Crosio. It was painted in 1898.

Crosio originally painted the Madonna for the Kuenzli Brothers in Switzerland. The painting depicts the Virgin Mary carrying Jesus as a child. In 1964 the Swiss province of the Schoenstatt Sisters purchased the original painting. It was then also called the Mother Thrice Admirable Madonna.

== See also ==
- Pilgrim Mother Campaign, which uses copies of the image
- Schoenstatt Shrine

== Sources ==
- Research on Luigi Crosio
- University of Dayton
