= Hubert Kennedy =

American author and mathematician (born 1931)

Hubert C. Kennedy
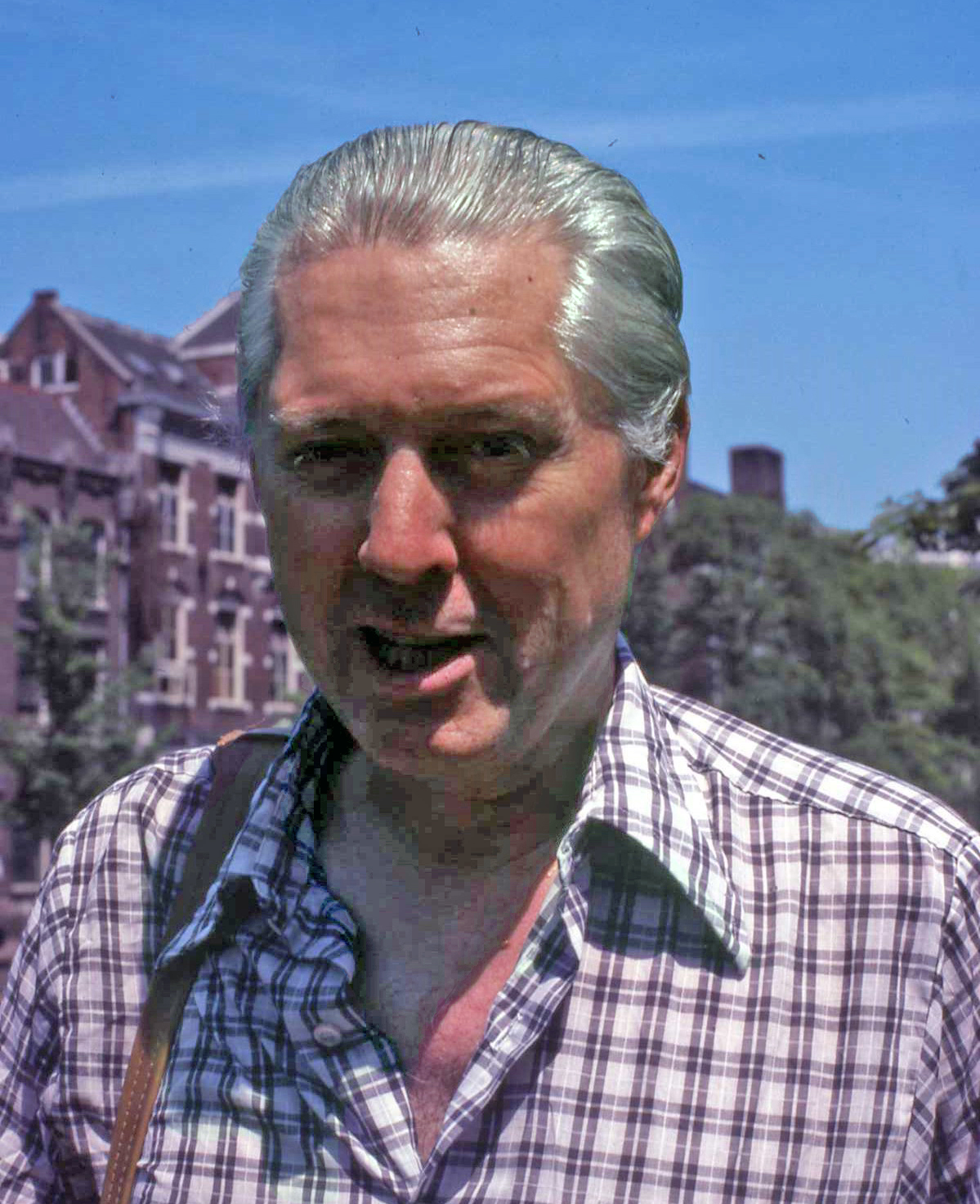
- Hubert Kennedy in 1983
- Born: March 6, 1931 (age 95); Polk County, Florida, U.S.
- Occupations: Mathematician, historian, gay rights activist
- Spouse: Don Endy

Hubert Collings Kennedy (born March 6, 1931) is an American author and mathematician.

== Career ==
Kennedy was born March 6, 1931, in Polk County, Florida, and studied mathematics at several universities. From 1961 he was a professor of mathematics, with research interest in the history of mathematics, at Providence College (Rhode Island). He spent three sabbatical years doing research in Italy and Germany. He published a definitive biography of Giuseppe Peano who conceived modern mathematical notation in his Formulario mathematico.

Kennedy came out as gay on the cover of the magazine The Cowl and, along with Eric Gordon, was part of the first Gay Pride parade in Providence, Rhode Island, which was held on June 26, 1976.

In 1986 Kennedy moved to San Francisco, where he continued his historical research, now on the beginnings of the gay movement in Germany. He has over 200 publications in several languages, from an analysis of the mathematical manuscripts of Karl Marx and a revelation of Marx's homophobia, to theoretical genetics and a proof of the impossibility of an organism that requires more than two sexes in order to reproduce. In addition, Kennedy wrote a biography of the German jurist and pioneering homosexual emancipationist Karl Heinrich Ulrichs, and edited the collected writings of Ulrichs. His translations of the boy-love novels of the German anarchist writer John Henry Mackay and his investigations of the writings of Mackay have helped establish Mackay's place in the gay canon.

Kennedy married his longtime companion, Don Endy, in 2014.

== Bibliography ==
- John Henry Mackay (Sagitta), Anarchist der Liebe, biography (2007).
- Karl Heinrich Ulrichs, Pioneer of the Modern Gay Movement (2002).
- 1980: PEANO: Life and Works of Giuseppe Peano, ISBN 9789027710680
- "Twelve articles on Giuseppe Peano" (PDF). San Francisco: Peremptory Publications. 2002. Collection of articles on life and mathematics of Peano (1960s to 1980s).
- Sex & Math in the Harvard Yard: The Memoirs of James Mills Peirce, novel.
- Homosexuality and Male Bonding in Pre-Nazi Germany: The Youth Movement, the Gay Movement and Male Bonding Before Hitler’s Rise: Original Transcripts from "Der Eigene", the First Gay Journal in the World (1991).
- Life’s Little Loafer, short story.
- From My Life (2009), autobiography by Kennedy.
- A Touch of Royalty: Gay Author James Barr, essay.
- Eight Mathematical Biographies, collections of short biographies.
- The Ideal Gay Man: The Story of "Der Kreis" (1999).
- Negation of the Negation: Karl Marx and Differential Calculus.
- In Memoriam: Five Gay Obituaries on Glenn Hogan, Mario Mieli, Roger Austen, Peter Schult, and Robert Turner.
- John Henry Mackay, Die letzte Pflicht & Albert Schnells Untergang (2007).
