= Isabella Bashmakova =

Russian historian of mathematics (1921-2005)

- Изабелла Григорьевна Башмакова
- Bashmakova in 1987
- Born: January 3, 1921; Rostov-on-Don
- Died: July 17, 2005 (aged 84); Zvenigorod
- Education: Moscow State University
- Awards: Honorary diplomas in 1971, 1976, and 1980; Koyré Medal (2001)
- Scientific career
- Fields: History of mathematics
- Thesis: (1948)
- Doctoral advisor: Sofya Yanovskaya

Isabella Grigoryevna Bashmakova (Russian: Изабелла Григорьевна Башмакова; January 3, 1921 – July 17, 2005) was a Russian historian of mathematics. In 2001, she was a recipient of the Alexander Koyré Medal of the International Academy of the History of Science.

== Education and career ==
Bashmakova was born on January 3, 1921, in Rostov-on-Don, to a family of Armenian descent. Her father, Grigory Georgiyevich Bashmakov, was a lawyer. Her family moved to Moscow in 1932. She began studies in the Faculty of Mechanics and Mathematics at Moscow State University in 1938, but was evacuated from Moscow during World War II, during which she served as a nurse in Samarkand. She completed a Ph.D. in 1948, under the supervision of Sofya Yanovskaya.

She continued at Moscow State as an assistant professor, and in 1949 was promoted to associate professor. In 1950 her husband, mathematician Andrei I. Lapin, was arrested for his opposition to Lysenkoism, but in part due to Bashmakova's efforts he was freed again in 1952. Bashmakova completed her D.Sc. in 1961 and became a full professor in 1968.

She retired and became a professor emeritus in 1999, and died on July 17, 2005, while vacationing in Zvenigorod.

== Contributions ==
Bashmakova's dissertation concerned the history of definitions of integers and rational numbers, from Euclid and Eudoxus to Zolotarev, Dedekind, and Kronecker.

Her later research contributions include a comparison of the tools used by Diophantus to solve Diophantine equation, versus more modern methods; following a line of thought suggested by Jacobi, she suggested that Diophantus' methods were more sophisticated than previously thought, but that their sophistication had been hidden by the emphasis on specific cases in Diophantus's writings. She used complex numbers to reinterpret the geometric transformations studied by François Viète. She has also studied the history of algebraic curves, and translated the works of Fermat into Russian.

== Books ==
Bashmakova's books include:

- Диофант и диофантовы уравнения, Nauka, 1972; Diophant und diophantische Gleichungen, Birkhäuser, 1974; Diophantus and Diophantine Equations, Mathematical Association of America, 1997.
- Становление алгебры: Из истории математических идей [The development of algebra: From the history of mathematical ideas], Znanie, 1979.
- История диофантова анализа: От Диофанта до Ферма [History of Diophantine analysis: From Diophantus to Fermat, Nauka, 1984.
- The beginnings and evolution of algebra (with Galina Smirnova, Mathematical Association of America, 2000)

== Recognition ==
In 1986, the International Congress of Mathematicians initially published a list of speakers that included no women. After protests, the executive committee of the congress invited six women to speak at the congress. Bashmakova was one of those six; she was unable to travel to the congress, but her paper appears in its proceedings.

The International Academy of the History of Science elected her as a corresponding member in 1966 and a full member in 1971. She was awarded honorary diplomas in 1971, 1976, and 1980. In 2001, she was awarded the Alexander Koyré Medal of the International Academy of the History of Science. In 2011, a conference of the Russian Academy of Sciences was dedicated in her honor.
