= Luigi Crosio =

Italian painter

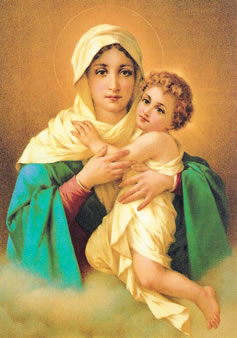
Refuge of Sinners Madonna, Luigi Crosio, 1898

Luigi Crosio (1835–1916) was an Italian painter who lived and worked in Turin, Italy. A fine draftsman and painter, Crosio's work was much sought after for lithographic reproduction.

== Life ==
Crosio was born in Acqui Terme. He attended the Accademia Albertina di Belle Arte in Turin.

His immediate work afterwards leaned towards commercial paintings, but thereafter he specialised in genre painting with romantic 17th century scenes, period portraits, or Pompeian scenes. He also liked the opera and depicted several scenes from popular operas. He was listed as a lithographer and was involved in publishing books and images.

He had several daughters and one of them, Carola Crosio, married the famous mathematician Giuseppe Peano (of Peano axioms fame) in 1887.

In 1898 he painted the famous Refugium Peccatorum Madonna (i.e. Refuge of Sinners Madonna) which was later also called Mother Thrice Admirable Madonna. The painting depicts the Virgin Mary, and Jesus as the Christ Child. One of his daughters served as model.

Crosio died on January 15, 1916, in Turin, Italy.

== Sources ==
- Research on Luigi Crosio
- 400 Years "Mother Thrice Admirable", University of Dayton
