= 1915 Avezzano earthquake =

Earthquake in Italy

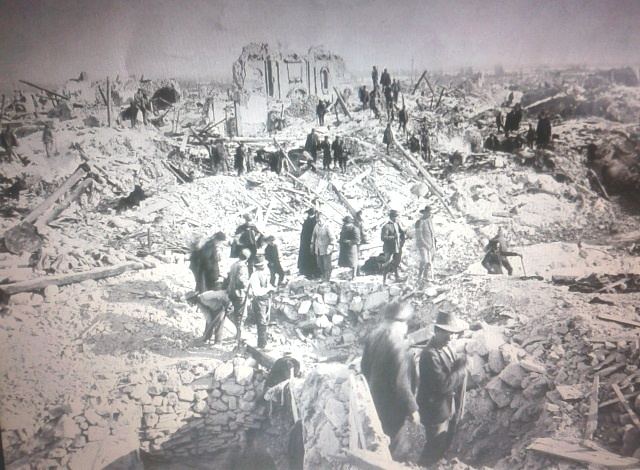
- Ruins of Avezzano in a photo of John Lansing Callan (USGS Library)

- Location within Italy
- UTC time: 1915-01-13 06:52:42
- ISC event
- USGS-ANSS: ComCat
- Local date: 13 January 1915
- Local time: 07:52:42
- Magnitude: 6.7 M_{w}
- Depth: 15 km (9.3 mi)
- Epicenter: 42.025°N 13.578°E
- Fault: Serrone Fault
- Areas affected: Marsica, Italy
- Total damage: $60 million
- Max. intensity: MMI XI (Extreme)
- Casualties: 29,978–32,610 dead

The 1915 Avezzano earthquake or 1915 Fucino earthquake occurred on 13 January in central Italy at 07:52:42 local time. The shock had a moment magnitude of 6.7 and a maximum Mercalli intensity of XI (Extreme). The epicenter was located in the city of Avezzano (which was destroyed) in the Province of L'Aquila. Around 30,000 direct fatalities and $60 million in damage resulted from the earthquake.

== Tectonic setting ==
The central Apennines of Italy are dominated by extensional tectonics as a result of either roll-back associated with continuing subduction of the Adriatic plate or northeastward movement of the Adriatic plate relative to the Eurasian plate. The epicentral area of the earthquake lies within the Fucino Basin, an area of active rifting with a Pliocene to recent fill of greater than 1 km of fluvial to lacustrine sediments. Since the Late Pliocene the subsidence has controlled by a set of NW-SE trending, SW-dipping normal faults, including the Marsican Hwy Fault (MHF) and the San Benedetto dei Marsi–Gioia dei Marsi Fault (SBMGF), which bound the northeast side of the basin.

== History ==
Central and southern Italy in particular have been struck by deadly earthquakes in the last 300 years, with the deadliest earthquake dating back to at least the 1693 Sicily earthquake. Powerful shocks in 1693, 1783, and 1908 as well as 1915 have killed over 30,000 people each.

== Earthquake ==
The earthquake had an estimated magnitude of 7.0–7.5 M_{s}, recalculated as 6.7 M_{w}. The calculated epicentre lies about 4 kilometres (2.5 mi) west-northwest of San Benedetto dei Marsi, between Gioia dei Marsi and the small village of Sperone. Surface ruptures that were mapped at the time show that parts of both the MHF and SBMGF moved during the earthquake. Focal mechanisms calculated using the limited instrumental data available for the earthquake suggest strike-slip faulting, but this is at odds with the known geological structure and the mechanism is thought to be purely extensional.

== Damage and casualties ==
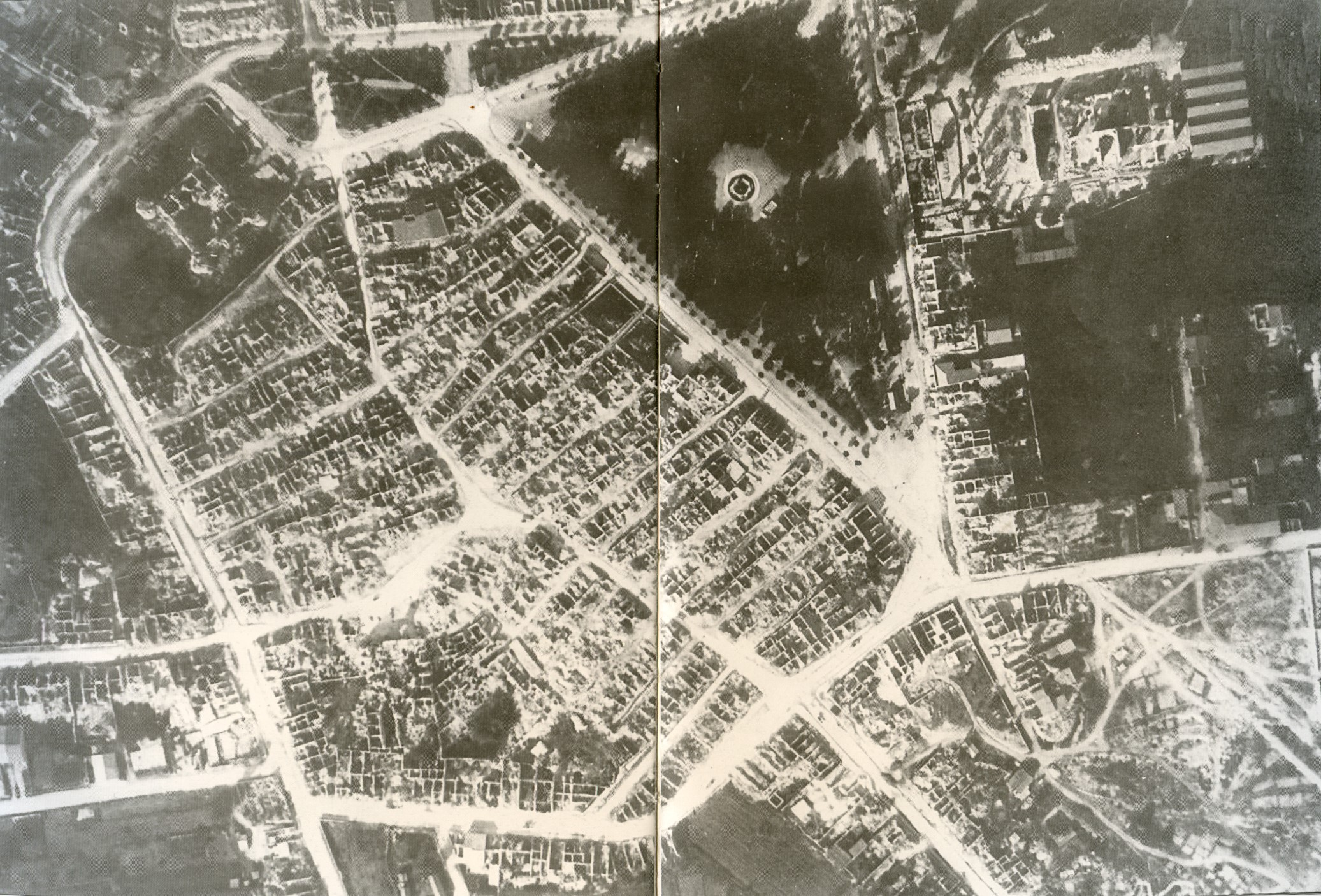
Aerial photo of Avezzano after the earthquake

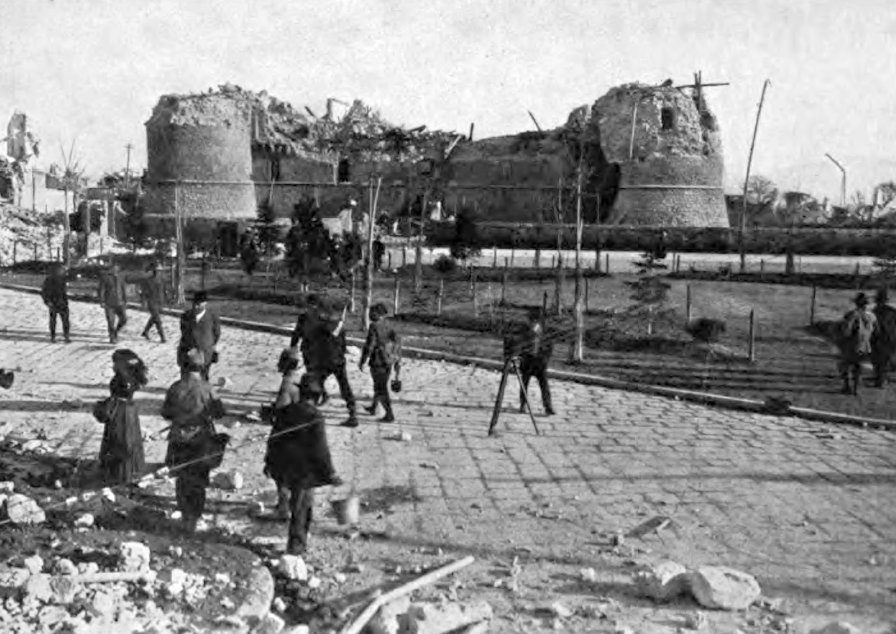
Ruins of Castle Orsini, Avezzano

The earthquake took place at around 8:00 local time affecting thousands of people throughout central and southern Italy; the shaking was even felt in Rome. The city of Avezzano was toppled from the shaking and only one high-rise building survived. According to Robinson (1915), ninety-six percent of its population was eliminated almost simultaneously, the worst casualty zone. Several other settlements were demolished in the worst of the earthquake. This damage was attributed to the length of the shock, over 1 minute, and the enormous amount of energy released during the tremor. Compound motion of the fault was also a likely contributor to the earthquake's destruction. The structure of the housing also contributed to the collapse; many homes had been built from simple rocks of varying size and were not reinforced by mortar or even wood.

Damage of the earthquake was distributed throughout central and southern Italy. Rome experienced minor damage, including a fallen statue reported in St John Lateran and cracks on the Column of Marcus Aurelius. In fact, damage from the earthquake was diverse; either the location was destroyed or experienced little to no damage.

Survivors were pulled out slowly from the ruins of earthquake-stricken zones. One man survived in a barn for a period of 25 days living solely off of grains and water. After a short time the searchers ran out of space to dispose of the debris as it was too overwhelming in mass, forcing the workers to give up. As E.V. Robinson later described, the remaining "work of excavation seemed to go on in an unsystematic and half hearted way".

Among those killed by the earthquake was Maria Gramegna, a promising young mathematician who had become a high school teacher in Avezzano.

== Response and relief efforts ==
Initial reports did not mention serious damage, and not until later that night did the scale of the devastation become clear. The government in Rome assumed local authorities had delayed reporting the facts, and it was rumored that they even tried to remove one mayor from office. However, when trying to serve him notice it became clear that he, together with most of his town's people, had died in the earthquake. Because of World War I the government decided not to accept foreign assistance, and a national rescue and relief effort was promptly started.

Among those nursing the victims was the Venerable Suzanne Aubert. She would write back to New Zealand in August:

There are now very few of the victims of the earthquake left in hospitals, but the wounded soldiers keep on arriving. Theirs is a pitiful sight, but I think that the sight of the crushed people was worse. You see only men in the soldiers, while with the other people, there was such a number of women and children. I feel quite at home with my work, but I am forgetting English in trying to understand the different dialects of the poor sufferers. Each province, almost each district has its own, it makes the service difficult. Fortunately we can go a long way with signs.

The ribbon of the Medal of Merit for the Avezzano Earthquake of 1915.

The Kingdom of Italy established the Medal of Merit for the Avezzano Earthquake of 1915 (Italian: Medaglia di benemerenza per il terremoto di Avezzano del 1915) on 8 August 1915 to reward the organizations and people who provided relief work to the survivors of the earthquake.

== See also ==
- List of earthquakes in 1915
- List of earthquakes in Italy
