= Diophantus and Diophantine Equations =

Mathematics book

- Author: Isabella Bashmakova
- Original title: Диофант и диофантовы уравнения
- Translator: Abe Shenitzer
- Language: Russian
- Genre: Non-fiction
- Publisher: Nauka
- Publication date: 1972
- English publication date: 1997

Diophantus and Diophantine Equations is a book in the history of mathematics, on the history of Diophantine equations and their solution by Diophantus of Alexandria. It was originally written in Russian by Isabella Bashmakova, and published by Nauka in 1972 under the title Диофант и диофантовы уравнения. It was translated into German by Ludwig Boll as Diophant und diophantische Gleichungen (Birkhäuser, 1974) and into English by Abe Shenitzer as Diophantus and Diophantine Equations (Dolciani Mathematical Expositions 20, Mathematical Association of America, 1997).

== Topics ==
In the sense considered in the book, a Diophantine equation is an equation written using polynomials whose coefficients are rational numbers. These equations are to be solved by finding rational-number values for the variables that, when plugged into the equation, make it become true. Although there is also a well-developed theory of integer (rather than rational) solutions to polynomial equations, it is not included in this book.

Diophantus of Alexandria studied equations of this type in the second century AD. Scholarly opinion has generally held that Diophantus only found solutions to specific equations, and had no methods for solving general families of equations. For instance, Hermann Hankel has written of the works of Diophantus that "not the slightest trace of a general, comprehensive method is discernible; each problem calls for some special method which refuses to work even for the most closely related problems". In contrast, the thesis of Bashmakova's book is that Diophantus indeed had general methods, which can be inferred from the surviving record of his solutions to these problems.

The opening chapter of the books tells what is known of Diophantus and his contemporaries, and surveys the problems published by Diophantus. The second chapter reviews the mathematics known to Diophantus, including his development of negative numbers, rational numbers, and powers of numbers, and his philosophy of mathematics treating numbers as dimensionless quantities, a necessary preliminary to the use of inhomogeneous polynomials. The third chapter brings in more modern concepts of algebraic geometry including the degree and genus of an algebraic curve, and rational mappings and birational equivalences between curves.

Chapters four and five concern conic sections, and the theorem that when a conic has at least one rational point it has infinitely many. Chapter six covers the use of secant lines to generate infinitely many points on a cubic plane curve, considered in modern mathematics as an example of the group law of elliptic curves. Chapter seven concerns Fermat's theorem on sums of two squares, and the possibility that Diophantus may have known of some form of this theorem. The remaining four chapters trace the influence of Diophantus and his works through Hypatia and into 19th-century Europe, particularly concentrating on the development of the theory of elliptic curves and their group law.

The German edition adds supplementary material including a report by Joseph H. Silverman on progress towards a proof of Fermat's Last Theorem. An updated version of the same material was included in the English translation.

== Audience and reception ==
Very little mathematical background is needed to read this book. Despite "qualms about Bashmakova's historical claims", reviewer David Graves writes that "a wealth of material, both mathematical and historical, is crammed into this remarkable little book", and he recommends it to any number theorist or scholar of the history of mathematics. Reviewer Alan Osborne is also positive, writing that it is "well-crafted, ... offering considerable historical information while inviting the reader to explore a great deal of mathematics."
