= Academia pro Interlingua =

Organization dedicated for the promotion of auxiliary languages

The Academia pro Interlingua was an organization dedicated to the promotion of international auxiliary languages, and is associated in particular with Giuseppe Peano's language Latino sine flexione (Latin without inflections).

The Academia was a descendant of the Kadem bevünetik volapüka (International Academy of Volapük) created at a Volapük congress in Munich in August 1887. Under Waldemar Rosenberger, who became the director in 1892, this group had transformed Volapük into Idiom Neutral and changed its name to Akademi Internasional de Lingu Universal in 1898.

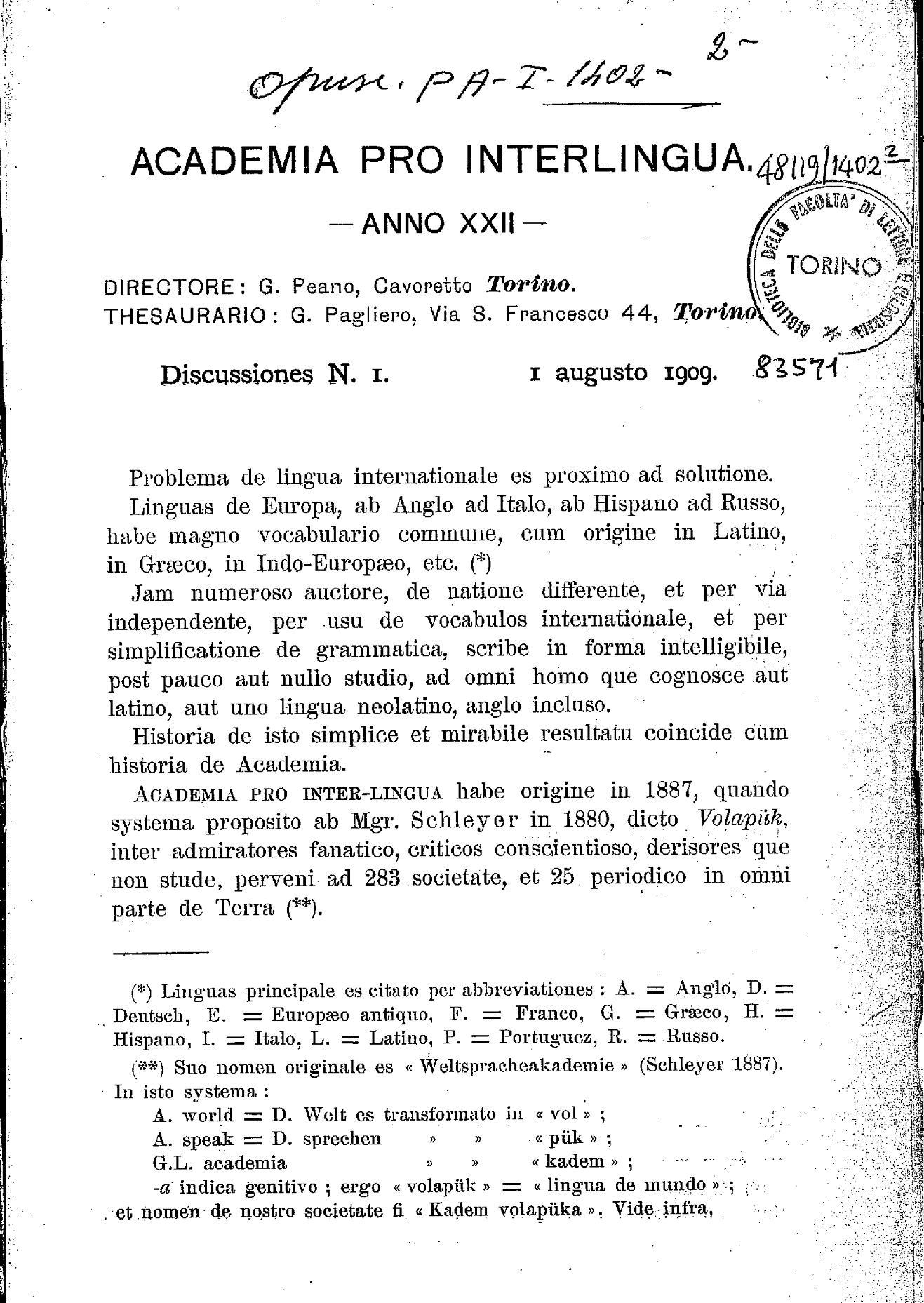
N. 1 of Academia pro Interlingua's journal Discussiones (1909)

When the Akademi effectively chose to abandon Idiom Neutral in favor of Latino sine flexione in 1908, it elected Peano as its director, and the name of the group was changed to Academia pro Interlingua since Interlingua was an alternative name for Peano's language. The original Academia pro Interlingua survived until about 1939.

The official journals of the "Academia" were "Discussiones" (1909–13), "Circulares" (1915–24), and "Academia pro Interlingua" (1925–27). They have been recently published in a CD-Rom by the mathematics department of the university of Turin. They show a collective attempt to propagate, in a democratic way, an international language to facilitate the scientific reports among nations, favouring the progress of civilization and culture.

== Concerning Interlingua de IALA (IA) ==
Today the name Interlingua often refers to a different language presented in 1951 by the International Auxiliary Language Association (IALA). Advocates for IA currently use, among others, the name Academia pro Interlingua.
