= Giuseppe Peano =

Italian mathematician and glottologist (1858–1932)

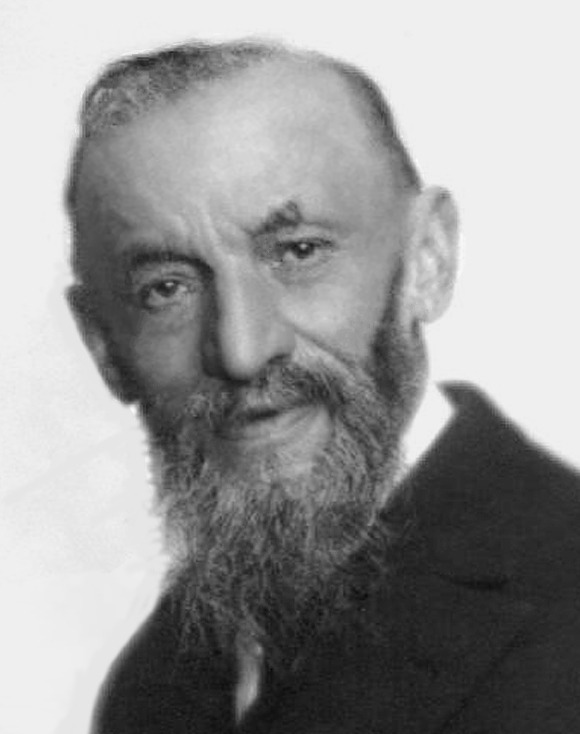
- Peano c. 1910s
- Born: 27 August 1858; Spinetta, Piedmont, Kingdom of Sardinia
- Died: 20 April 1932 (aged 73); Turin, Kingdom of Italy
- Citizenship: Italian
- Education: University of Turin
- Known for: Peano axioms Peano curve Peano existence theorem Peano-Jordan measure Peano kernel theorem Peano–Russell notation Latino sine flexione Vector space Peano surface Logicism
- Awards: Knight of the Order of Saints Maurizio and Lazzaro; Knight of the Crown of Italy; Commendatore of the Crown of Italy; Correspondent of the Accademia dei Lincei
- Scientific career
- Fields: Mathematics; Linguistics
- Workplaces: University of Turin, Accademia dei Lincei
- Academic advisors: Enrico D'Ovidio; F. Faà di Bruno
- Notable students: Maria Gramegna; Annibale Pastore

Giuseppe Peano (/peɪˈɑːnoʊ/; Italian: [dʒuˈzɛppe peˈaːno]; 27 August 1858 – 20 April 1932) was an Italian mathematician and glottologist. The author of over 200 books and papers, he was a founder of mathematical logic and set theory, to which he contributed much notation, for instance, notations of set operations. The standard axiomatization of the natural numbers is named the Peano axioms in his honor. As part of this effort, he made key contributions to the modern rigorous and systematic treatment of the method of mathematical induction. He spent most of his career teaching mathematics at the University of Turin. He also created an international auxiliary language, Latino sine flexione ("Latin without inflections"), which is a simplified version of Classical Latin. Most of his books and papers are in Latino sine flexione, while others are in Italian.

== Biography ==
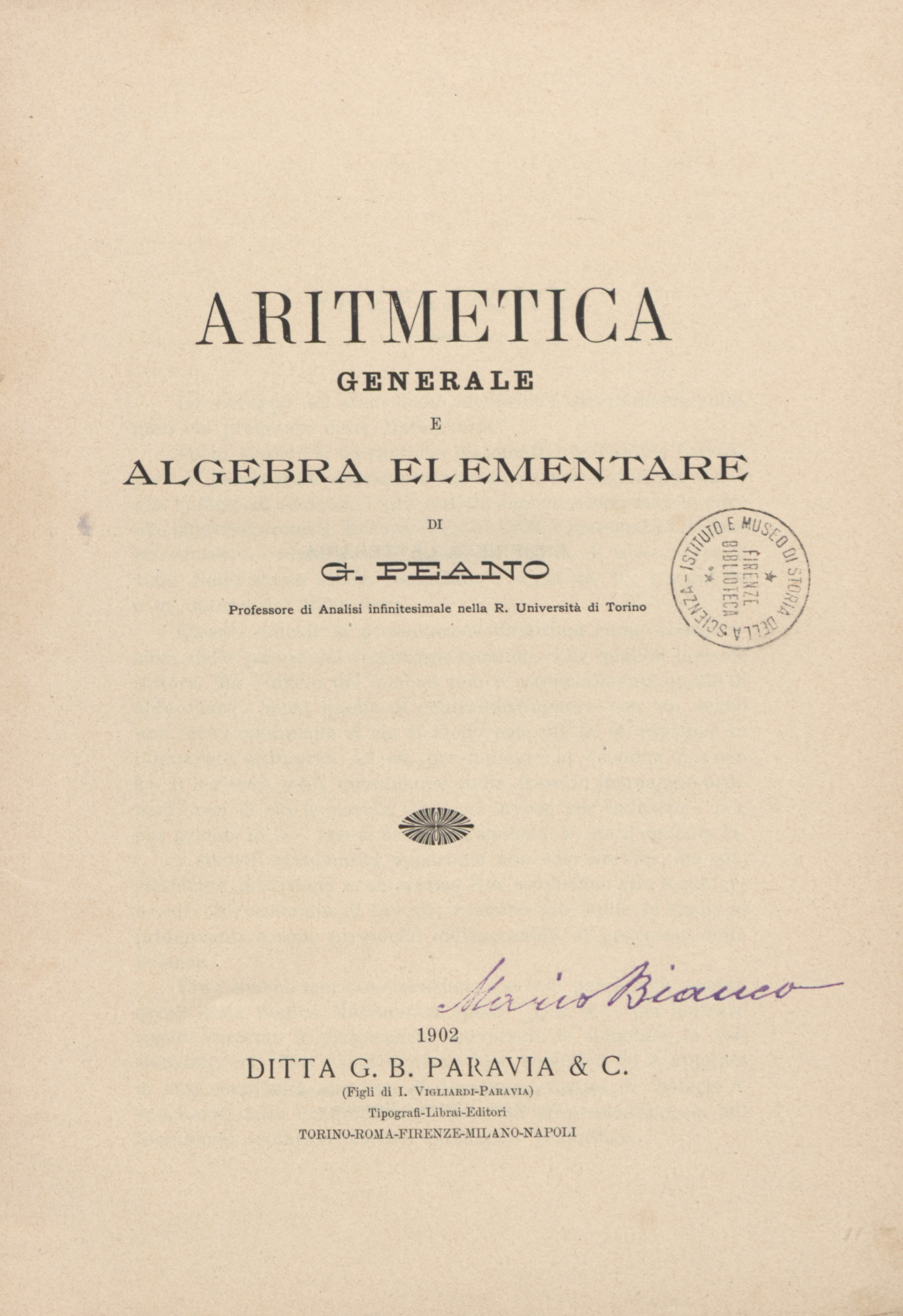
Aritmetica generale e algebra elementare, 1902

Peano was born and raised on a farm at Spinetta, a hamlet now belonging to Cuneo, Piedmont, Italy. He attended the Liceo classico Cavour in Turin, and enrolled at the University of Turin in 1876, graduating in 1880 with high honours, after which the University employed him to assist first Enrico D'Ovidio, and then Angelo Genocchi, the Chair of calculus. Due to Genocchi's poor health, Peano took over the teaching of calculus course within two years. His first major work, a textbook on calculus entitled Calcolo differenziale, e principii di calcolo integrale, was published in 1884 and was credited to Genocchi. A few years later, Peano published his first book dealing with mathematical logic. Here the modern symbols for the union and intersection of sets appeared for the first time.

Peano joined Freemasonry. It is not known where he was initiated, but on 24 December 1885, he was affiliated as Master in the "Dante Alighieri" Masonic Lodge in Turin. Here he knew the Italian socialist and freemason Giovanni Lerda (1853-1927), a close collaborator of Cesare Lombroso.

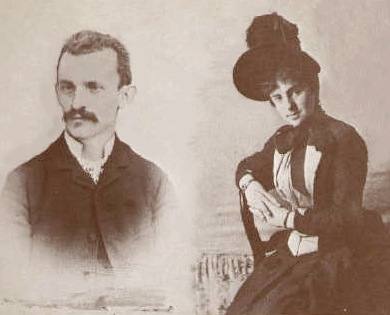
Giuseppe Peano and his wife Carola Crosio in 1887

In 1887, Peano married Carola Crosio, the daughter of the Turin-based painter Luigi Crosio, known for painting the Refugium Peccatorum Madonna. In 1886, he began teaching concurrently at the Royal Military Academy, and was promoted to Professor First Class in 1889. In that year he published the Peano axioms, a formal foundation for the collection of natural numbers. The next year, the University of Turin also granted him his full professorship. The Peano curve was published in 1890 as the first example of a space-filling curve which demonstrated that the unit interval and the unit square have the same cardinality. Today it is understood to be an early example of what is known as a fractal.

In 1890 Peano founded the journal Rivista di Matematica, which published its first issue in January 1891. In 1891 Peano started the Formulario Project. It was to be an "Encyclopedia of Mathematics", containing all known formulae and theorems of mathematical science using a standard notation invented by Peano. In 1897, the first International Congress of Mathematicians was held in Zürich. Peano was a key participant, presenting a paper on mathematical logic. He also started to become increasingly occupied with Formulario to the detriment of his other work.

In 1898 he presented a note to the Academy about binary numeration and its ability to be used to represent the sounds of languages. He also became so frustrated with publishing delays (due to his demand that formulae be printed on one line) that he purchased a printing press.

Paris was the venue for the Second International Congress of Mathematicians in 1900. The conference was preceded by the First International Conference of Philosophy where Peano was a member of the patronage committee. He presented a paper which posed the question of correctly formed definitions in mathematics, i.e. "how do you define a definition?". This became one of Peano's main philosophical interests for the rest of his life. At the conference, Peano met Bertrand Russell and gave him a copy of Formulario. Russell was struck by Peano's innovative logical symbols and after the conference, he retired to the country "to study quietly every word written by him or his disciples".

Peano's students Mario Pieri and Alessandro Padoa also had papers presented at the philosophy congress. For the mathematical congress, Peano did not speak, but Padoa's memorable presentation has been frequently recalled. A resolution calling for the formation of an "international auxiliary language" to facilitate the spread of mathematical (and commercial) ideas, was proposed; Peano fully supported it.

By 1901, Peano was at the peak of his mathematical career. He had made advances in the areas of analysis, foundations and logic, made many contributions to the teaching of calculus and also contributed to the fields of differential equations and vector analysis. Peano played a key role in the axiomatization of mathematics and was a leading pioneer in the development of mathematical logic. Peano had by this stage become heavily involved with the Formulario project and his teaching began to suffer. In fact, he became so determined to teach his new mathematical symbols that the calculus in his course was neglected. As a result, he was dismissed from the Royal Military Academy but retained his post at Turin University.

In 1903 Peano announced his work on an international auxiliary language called Latino sine flexione ("Latin without inflexion," later called Interlingua, and the precursor of the Interlingua of the IALA). This was an important project for him (along with finding contributors for 'Formulario'). The idea was to use Latin vocabulary, since this was widely known, but simplify the grammar as much as possible and remove all irregular and anomalous forms to make it easier to learn. On 3 January 1908, he read a paper to the Academia delle Scienze di Torino in which he started speaking in Latin and, as he described each simplification, introduced it into his speech so that by the end he was talking in his new language.

The year 1908 was important for Peano. The fifth and final edition of the Formulario project, titled Formulario mathematico, was published. It contained 4200 formulae and theorems, all completely stated and most of them proved. The book received little attention since much of the content was dated by this time. However, it remains a significant contribution to mathematical literature. The comments and examples were written in Latino sine flexione.

Also in 1908, Peano took over the chair of higher analysis at Turin (this appointment was to last for only two years). He was elected the director of Academia pro Interlingua. Having previously created Idiom Neutral, the Academy effectively chose to abandon it in favour of Peano's Latino sine flexione.

After his mother died in 1910, Peano divided his time between teaching, working on texts aimed for secondary schooling including a dictionary of mathematics, and developing and promoting his and other auxiliary languages, becoming a revered member of the international auxiliary language movement. He used his membership of the Accademia dei Lincei to present papers written by friends and colleagues who were not members (the Accademia recorded and published all presented papers given in sessions).

During the years 1913–1918, Peano published several papers that dealt with the remainder term for various numerical quadrature formulas, and introduced the Peano kernel.

In 1925 Peano switched Chairs unofficially from Infinitesimal Calculus to Complementary Mathematics, a field which better suited his current style of mathematics. This move became official in 1931. Giuseppe Peano continued teaching at Turin University until the day before he died when he suffered a fatal heart attack.

== Milestones and honours received ==
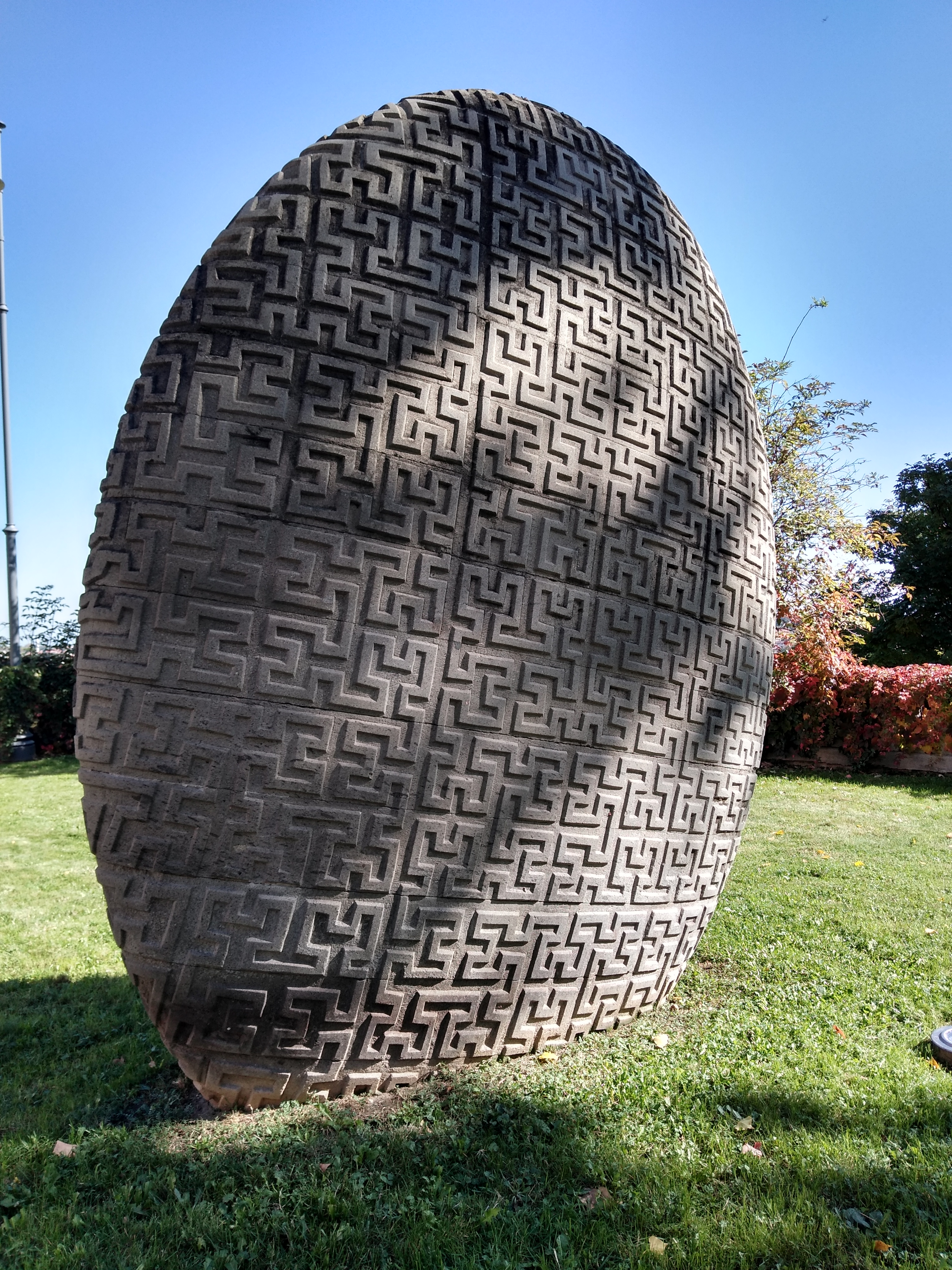
Monument to Peano in Cuneo, Italy, showing the Hilbert curve.

- 1881: Published first paper.
- 1884: Calcolo Differenziale e Principii di Calcolo Integrale.
- 1887: Applicazioni Geometriche del Calcolo Infinitesimale.
- 1889: Appointed Professor First Class at the Royal Military Academy.
- 1889: Arithmetices principia: nova methodo exposita.
- 1890: Appointed Extraordinary Professor of infinitesimal calculus at the University of Turin.
- 1891: Made a member of the Academy of Science, Torino.
- 1893: Lezioni di Analisi Infinitesimale, 2 vols.
- 1895: Promoted to Ordinary Professor.
- 1901: Made Knight of the Order of Saints Maurizio and Lazzaro.
- 1903: Announces Latino sine flexione.
- 1905: Made Knight of the Order of the Crown of Italy. Elected a corresponding member of the Accademia dei Lincei in Rome, the highest Italian honour for scientists.
- 1908: Fifth and final edition of the Formulario mathematico.
- 1917: Made an Officer of the Crown of Italy.
- 1921: Promoted to Commendatore of the Crown of Italy.

== Bibliography ==
Peano's writings in English translation

- 1889. "The principles of arithmetic, presented by a new method" in Jean van Heijenoort, 1967. A Source Book in Mathematical Logic, 1879–1931. Harvard Univ. Press: 83–97.
- 1973. Selected works of Giuseppe Peano. Kennedy, Hubert C., ed. and transl. With a biographical sketch and bibliography. London: Allen & Unwin.

== See also ==
- Arithmetices principia, nova methodo exposita
- Foundations of geometry
