= Church of the Gesù, Frascati =

Church building in Frascati, Italy

Coordinates: 41°48′31″N 12°40′52″E

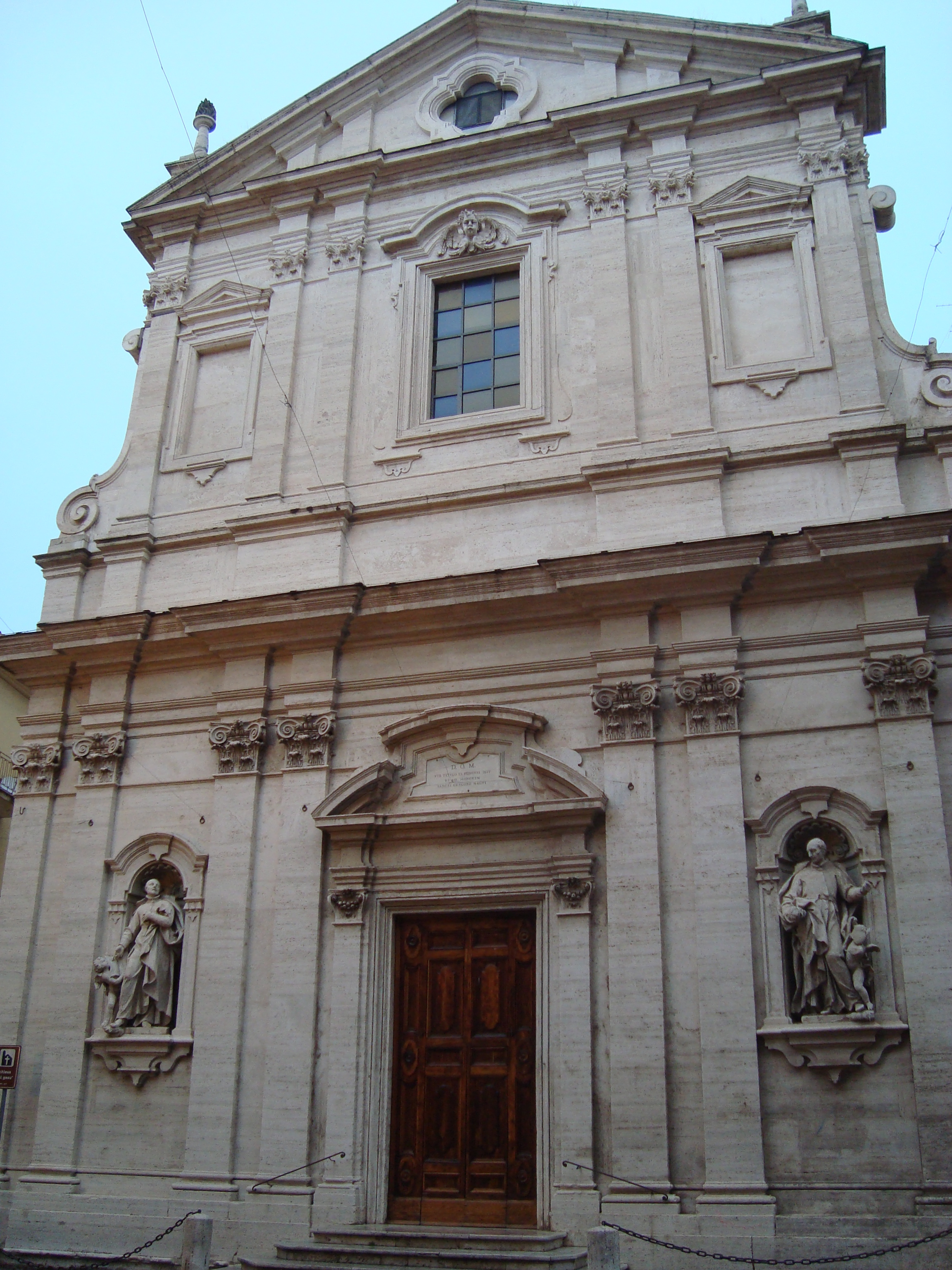
Facade of the church of the Gesu in Frascati.

Church of the Gesù is a Roman Catholic church in Frascati, in the province of Rome, in Italy.

The original church was built in 1520. In 1554, the city began the construction of another church to replace the original one, but did not complete it. In 1560, the Jesuits took possession of the site and completed it by 1597, calling it the church of the Annunciation of the Blessed Mary. In 1694 the Jesuits decided to expand the church and completed the new church by 1700.

The 18th century Blessed Antonio Baldinucci developed a particular devotion to the Refugium Peccatorum (Refuge of Sinners) image of Virgin Mary in the church, which has been considered miraculous. The Jesuits spread copies of the image to Mexico by the 19th century and it began to be depicted in missions there.

Saint Vincent Mary Pallotti celebrated his first mass here.

== See also ==
- List of Jesuit sites
