= Medal of Merit for the Avezzano Earthquake of 1915 =

Italian military award

- Type: Meritorious service medal
- Awarded for: Relief work related to the 1915 Avezzano earthquake
- Presented by: Kingdom of Italy
- Eligibility: Military and civilian personnel and organizations
- Established: 8 August 1915
- Ribbon the medal

The Medal of Merit for the Avezzano Earthquake of 1915 (Italian: Medaglia di benemerenza per il terremoto di Avezzano del 1915) was a medal established by the Kingdom of Italy in 1915 to recognize service in support of relief efforts related to the 1915 Avezzano earthquake. In 1916, a certificate of honorable mention was established to recognize relief service in connection with the earthquake which did not rise to a level meeting the criteria for the medal itself.

== History ==
On 13 January 1915, the 1915 Avezzano earthquake struck central Italy with its epicenter at Avezzano. The earthquake destroyed all but one building in Avezzano and killed over 30,000 people, including 96 percent of the population of Avezzano. Shaking was felt as far away as Rome, where minor damage occurred. Overall, damage totaled US$60 million.

The Kingdom of Italy established the Medal of Merit for the Avezzano Earthquake of 1915 (Italian: Medaglia di benemerenza per il terremoto di Avezzano del 1915) by Lieutenant Legislative Decree on 8 August 1915 to reward the organizations and people who between the day of the earthquake (13 January 1915) and 30 June 1915, had acquired a title of public merit by providing relief work to the survivors of the earthquake or making substantial donations to them, including providing rescue, health, or administrative services to the survivors as well as meeting the material or moral needs of the injured. The new legislation did not modify the provisions of Royal Decree Number 1168 of 30 April 1851, with which King of Sardinia Victor Emmanuel II established the medals for civil valor, a decree which remained in effect after the unification of Italy in 1861, when he became King of Italy.

The decree creating the medal established three classes of it — gold, silver, and bronze — to be awarded depending on the level of merit for which the recipient qualified. The recognition consisted of a diploma of merit and the related gold, silver, or bronze medal. The medals, minted at the expense of the government, were delivered together with an accompanying diploma to the decorated organizations and persons. The names of those decorated were published in the Gazzetta Ufficiale del Regno d'Italia ("Official Gazette of the Kingdom of Italy").

Lieutenant Decree Number 574 of 1 May 1916 added a fourth level of recognition by establishing a certificate of honorable mention to recognize individuals whose contribution to relief efforts was worthy of recognition, but not to a degree of merit to qualify for a gold, silver, or bronze medal.

== Eligibility criteria ==
The work performed by candidates for the medal was ascertained by certification. Certification authorities were as follows:

- The local heads of the various government administrations and of the heads of the various military corps for persons belonging to such administrations or corps;
- The Central Committee of the Italian Red Cross Association for people who had been part of the teams or committees employed by the association itself;
- The mayor, with the approval of the prefect (Italian: prefetto) of the province, for people who were members of rescue teams or committees or who provided relief work in isolation.

These certifications originally had to be presented to the competent offices by 30 October 1915, although Lieutenant Decree Number 1649 issued on 30 October extended this deadline to 31 December 1915.

King Victor Emmanuel III awarded the medal or certificate of honorable mention with the relevant diploma upon proposal of the Minister of the Interior, following the opinion of a commission composed of:

- a commission president, who was a state councilor designated by the Minister of the Interior;
- the general director of the Civil Administration;
- the director general of public health;
- the director general of public security;
- the general director of special services at the Ministry of Public Works;
- a general officer designated by the Minister of War;
- the commander of the Rome police force;
- an official from the Ministry of the Interior responsible for the secretarial office of the commission.

The Lieutenant General of the King could also award the medal upon a simple proposal from the Minister of the Interior in the case provided for by Royal Decree no. 2706 of 1884, i.e., when the generous act was sufficiently ascertained due to the circumstances of time and place in which it was carried out and the quality of the people who witnessed it.

== Appearance ==
=== Medal ===
The medal is gold, silver, or bronze depending on the degree of merit, and has a diameter of 35 millimetres (1.4 in). The obverse bears an effigy of King Victor Emmanuel III encircled by the inscription "VITTORIO EMANUELE III" ("VICTOR EMMANUEL III"). The signature of the engraver, "Motti", appears under the king's neck. The reverse bears the inscription "TERREMOTO 13 GENNAIO 1915" ("EARTHQUAKE 13 JANUARY 1915") surrounded by two oak branches tied at the bottom with a ribbon. A crowned "Z", the mark of the Royal Mint, is inscribed at the bottom of the reverse.

Other versions of the medal exist that differ in the engraver, bust, and inscriptions, Some of them were produced by private companies such as Stefano Johnson, based in Baranzate.

=== Ribbon ===
The medal was worn hanging on the left side of the chest with a silk ribbon with an overall width of 36 millimetres (1.4 in), scarlet red in color with black edges of 6 millimetres (0.24 in) each.
