= Peano kernel theorem =

Mathematical theorem used in numerical analysis

In numerical analysis, the Peano kernel theorem is a general result on error bounds for a wide class of numerical approximations (such as numerical quadratures), defined in terms of linear functionals. It is attributed to Giuseppe Peano.

== Statement ==
Let $\mathcal{V}[a,b]$ be the space of all functions $f$ that are differentiable on $(a,b)$ that are of bounded variation on $[a,b]$, and let $L$ be a linear functional on $\mathcal{V}[a,b]$. Assume that that $L$ annihilates all polynomials of degree $\leq \nu$, i.e.
$$Lp=0,\qquad \forall p\in\mathbb{P}_\nu[x].$$
Suppose further that for any bivariate function $g(x,\theta)$ with $g(x,\cdot),\,g(\cdot,\theta)\in C^{\nu+1}[a,b]$, the following is valid:
$$L\int_a^bg(x,\theta)\,d\theta=\int_a^bLg(x,\theta)\,d\theta,$$
and define the Peano kernel of $L$ as
$$k(\theta)=L[(x-\theta)^\nu_+],\qquad\theta\in[a,b],$$
using the notation
$$(x-\theta)^\nu_+ = \begin{cases} (x-\theta)^\nu, & x\geq\theta, \\ 0, & x\leq\theta. \end{cases}$$
The Peano kernel theorem states that, if $k\in\mathcal{V}[a,b]$, then for every function $f$ that is $\nu+1$ times continuously differentiable, we have
$$Lf=\frac{1}{\nu!}\int_a^bk(\theta)f^{(\nu+1)}(\theta)\,d\theta.$$

=== Bounds ===
Several bounds on the value of $Lf$ follow from this result:
$$\begin{align}
|Lf|&\leq\frac{1}{\nu!}\|k\|_1\|f^{(\nu+1)}\|_\infty\\[5pt]
|Lf|&\leq\frac{1}{\nu!}\|k\|_\infty\|f^{(\nu+1)}\|_1\\[5pt]
|Lf|&\leq\frac{1}{\nu!}\|k\|_2\|f^{(\nu+1)}\|_2
\end{align}$$

where $\|\cdot\|_1$, $\|\cdot\|_2$ and $\|\cdot\|_\infty$are the taxicab, Euclidean and maximum norms respectively.

== Application ==
In practice, the main application of the Peano kernel theorem is to bound the error of an approximation that is exact for all $f\in\mathbb{P}_\nu$. The theorem above follows from the Taylor polynomial for $f$ with integral remainder:

$$\begin{align}
f(x)=f(a) + {} & (x-a)f'(a) + \frac{(x-a)^2}{2}f''(a)+\cdots \\[6pt]
& \cdots+\frac{(x-a)^\nu}{\nu!}f^{(\nu)}(a)+
\frac{1}{\nu!}\int_a^x(x-\theta)^\nu f^{(\nu+1)}(\theta)\,d\theta,
\end{align}$$

defining $L(f)$ as the error of the approximation, using the linearity of $L$ together with exactness for $f\in\mathbb{P}_\nu$ to annihilate all but the final term on the right-hand side, and using the $(\cdot)_+$ notation to remove the $x$-dependence from the integral limits.

== See also ==
- Divided differences
