= Aleksandr Bashmakov =

Belarusian professional football coach

Personal information
- Full name: Aleksandr Nikolayevich Bashmakov
- Date of birth: 18 May 1950 (age 76)
- Place of birth: Gomel, Belarusian SSR
- Position: Midfielder

Senior career*
Years	Team	Apps	(Gls)
1970s	Sputnik Minsk		
1970s	Metallurg Molodechno		
1976	Shinnik Bobruisk		
1980	Torpedo Zhodino		

Managerial career
- 1993–1994: Dnepr Mogilev
- 1994–2001: Belarus U17
- 1994–2001: Belarus U19
- 1994–1996: Belarus (assistant)
- 2000: Belarus (assistant)
- 2001: Lokomotiv Minsk
- 2002–2003: Torpedo-SKA Minsk (assistant)
- 2003–2004: Torpedo-SKA Minsk
- 2005: Dinamo Minsk
- 2009: Torpedo-ZIL Moscow
- 2013: BATE Borisov (assistant)
- 2014: Rubin Kazan (assistant)
- * Club domestic league appearances and goals

Aleksandr Nikolayevich Bashmakov (Russian: Александр Николаевич Башмаков; born 18 May 1950) is a Belarusian professional football coach.
