= Arturo Graf =

Italian poet (1848–1913)

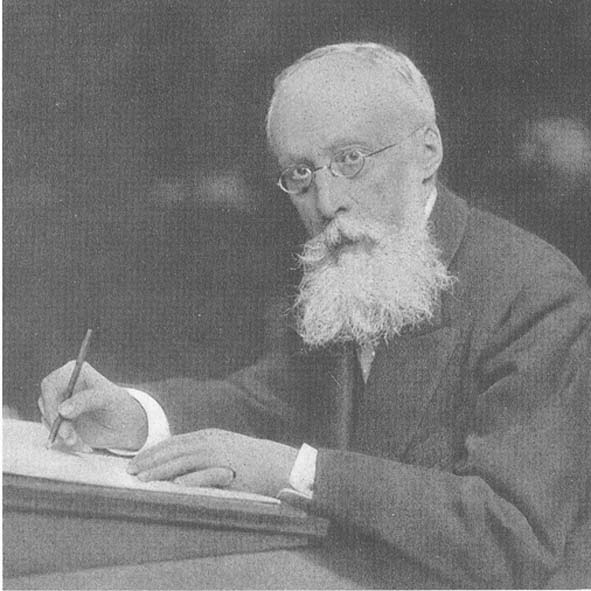
Arturo Graf

Arturo Graf (18 January 1848 – 30 May 1913), was an Italian poet and literary critic.

== Biography ==
He was born in Athens, Greece, to a father born in Nuremberg, and a mother from Ancona. His father was a merchant but with wide-ranging literary interests and fluent in multiple languages. As a boy, the family moved to Trieste. Arturo, who spoke both Greek and Italian, travelled extensively through Italy during his youth. Circa 1855, after the death of his father, the family lived with his maternal uncle for a time in Brăila, Romania. There he learned Latin with private tutors. In time, he moved with his mother to Naples to further his studies. He continued to travel through Italy, graduating from Liceo in 1867 and enrolling in University to study law. After graduating, he briefly moved back to Romania to work in what was now his brother's business, but was back in Rome by 1874. In these years, he composed some books of poetry.

He was educated at the University of Naples and became a lecturer on Italian literature in Rome, till in 1876 he was appointed professor of Comparative History of Neo-Latin Literature at the University of Turin. In 1882 he became professor of Italian literature at Turin. Afflicted with various ailments during life, he stepped down as a professor in 1910.

He was one of the founders of the Giornale della letteratura italiana, and his publications include valuable prose criticism. he also published in other journals such as Nueva Antologia, Rivista Europea, Rivista di Filologia e d'istruzione classica, Rivist di fillologia romanza, and rivista di filosofia scientifica. He is best known as a poet. His various volumes of verse—Poesie e novelle (1874), Dopo il tramonto, versi (1893), Le Danaidi (1897), Morgana (1901), Poemetti drammatici (1904), and Le rime della selva (1905) —give him a high place among the recent lyrical writers of his country. He was prolific in his literary analysis. He wrote the romance novel Il riscatto (1901).

He died in Turin.

== Works ==
- Delle qualità e parti della tragedia, (1874)
- Della Poesia popolare rumena, (1875)
- Dell'epica francese nel medio evo, (1876)
- Amleto, indole del personaggio e del drama, (1876)
- Dell'epica neolatina primitiva, (1876)
- Delle origini del dramma moderno (1876)
- Dello spirito poetico dei tempi nostri, (1876)
- Di una trattazione scientifica della storia letteraria, (1877)
- Storia letteraria e comparazione, (1877)
- La leggeda del paradiso terrestre, (1878)
- Studio dramatici, (1878)
- Prometeo della poesia, (1880)
- Sulla memoria e nelle immaginazioni del medio evo, (1882)
- Cavalieri e animali, (1884)
- L'insgenameto classico nell scuole secondarie, (1887)
- Attraverso el cinqueciento, (1888)
- La crisi literaria, (1888)
- Il diavolo, (1889)
- I precursori del Barone de Munchausen, (1889)
- Questioni di critica, (1889)
- La fatalità nelle eredanze del medio evo, (1890)
- Miti, leggenda e superstizioni del medio evo, (1892)
- Foscolo, Manzoni e Leopardi, (1898)
- Victor Hugo passati cento anni della nascita, (1902)
- Il Canto XXVII de Purgatorio letto nell Sala di Dante in Orsanmichele, (1902)
- I fenomeno del sceentiasmo, (1905)
- Per la nostra cultura, (1907)
- L'Anglomania e le influsso inglese in Italia nel secolo XVIII, (1911)
