= Sofya Yanovskaya =

Russian mathematician (1896-1966)

Sofya Yanovskaya

Sofya Aleksandrovna Yanovskaya (also Janovskaja; Russian: Софи́я Алекса́ндровна Яно́вская; 31 January 1896 – 24 October 1966) was a Soviet mathematician, philosopher and historian, specializing in the history of mathematics, mathematical logic, and philosophy of mathematics. She is best known for her efforts in restoring the research of mathematical logic in the Soviet Union and publishing and editing the mathematical works of Karl Marx.

== Biography ==
Yanovskaya was born in Pruzhany, a town near Brest, to a Jewish family of accountant Sender Neimark; the family moved to Odessasoon after her birth. From 1915 to 1918, she studied in a gymnasium for girls in Odessa, when she became a communist. She worked as a party official until 1924, when she started teaching at the Institute of Red Professors. With exception of the war years (1941–1945), she worked at Moscow State University until retirement.

Engels had noted in his writings that Karl Marx had written some mathematics. Yanonskaya found Marx's ''Mathematical Manuscripts'' and she arranged for their first publication in 1933 in Russian. She received her doctoral degree in 1935. Her work on Karl Marx's mathematical manuscripts began in 1930s and may have had some influence on the study of non-standard analysis in China. In the academia she is most remembered now for her work on history and philosophy of mathematics, as well as for her influence on young generation of researchers. She persuaded Ludwig Wittgenstein when he was visiting Soviet Union in 1935 to give up his idea to relocate to the Soviet Union. In 1968 Yanovskaya arranged for a better publication of Marx's work.

She died from diabetes in Moscow.

== Awards and honours ==
For her work, Yanovskaya received the Order of Lenin and other medals.
