= Refugium Peccatorum =

Title of the Virgin Mary

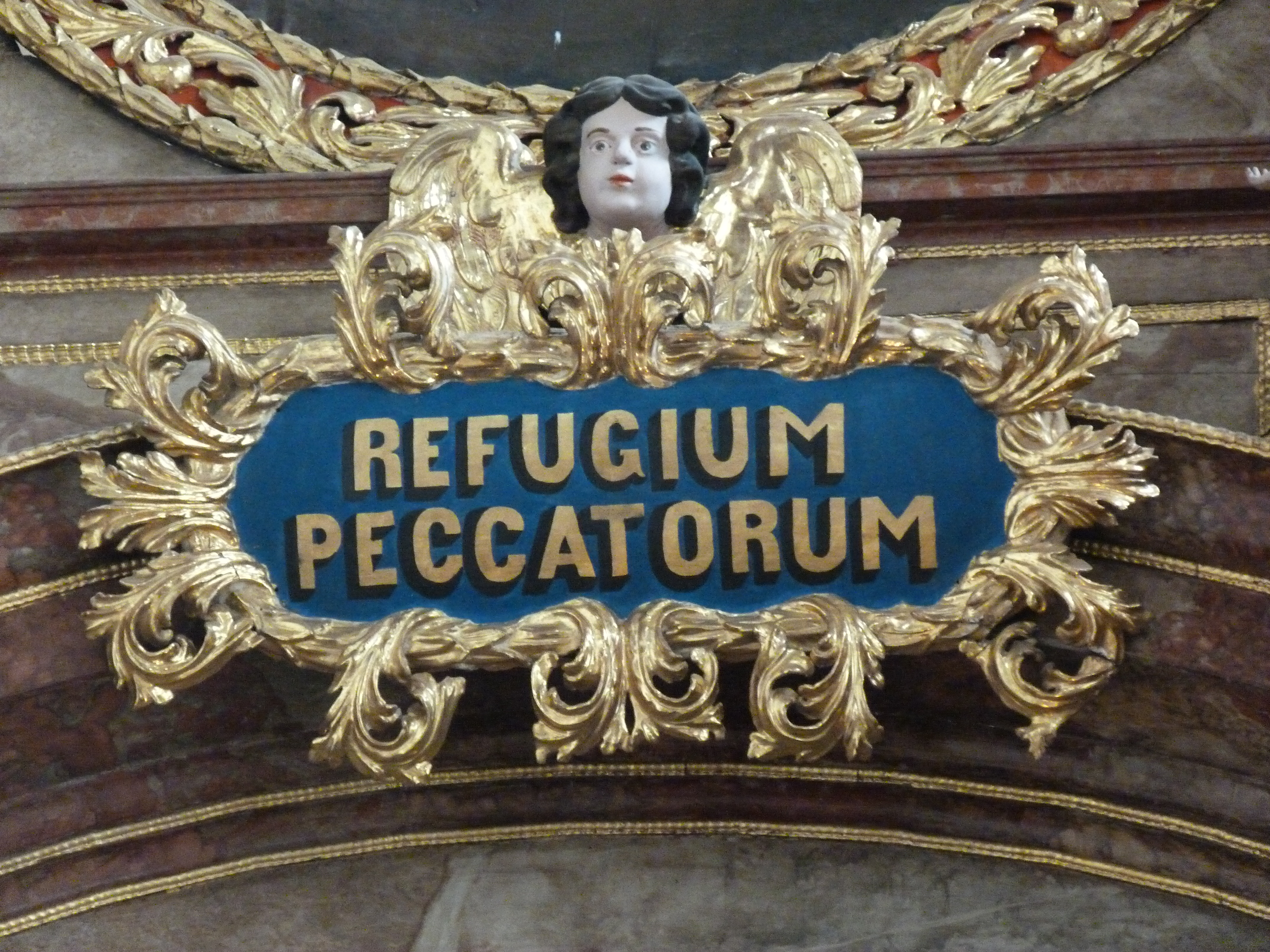
Plaque bearing the phrase "Refugium Peccatorum"

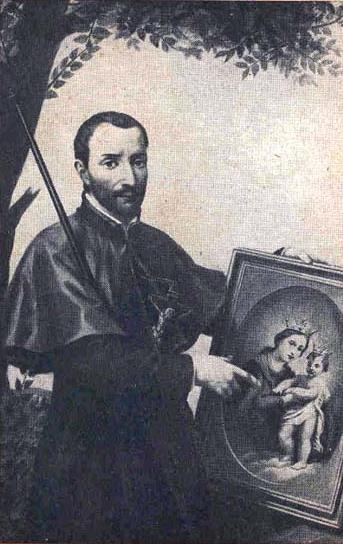
Blessed Antonio Baldinucci and his miraculous Refugium Peccatorum Madonna.

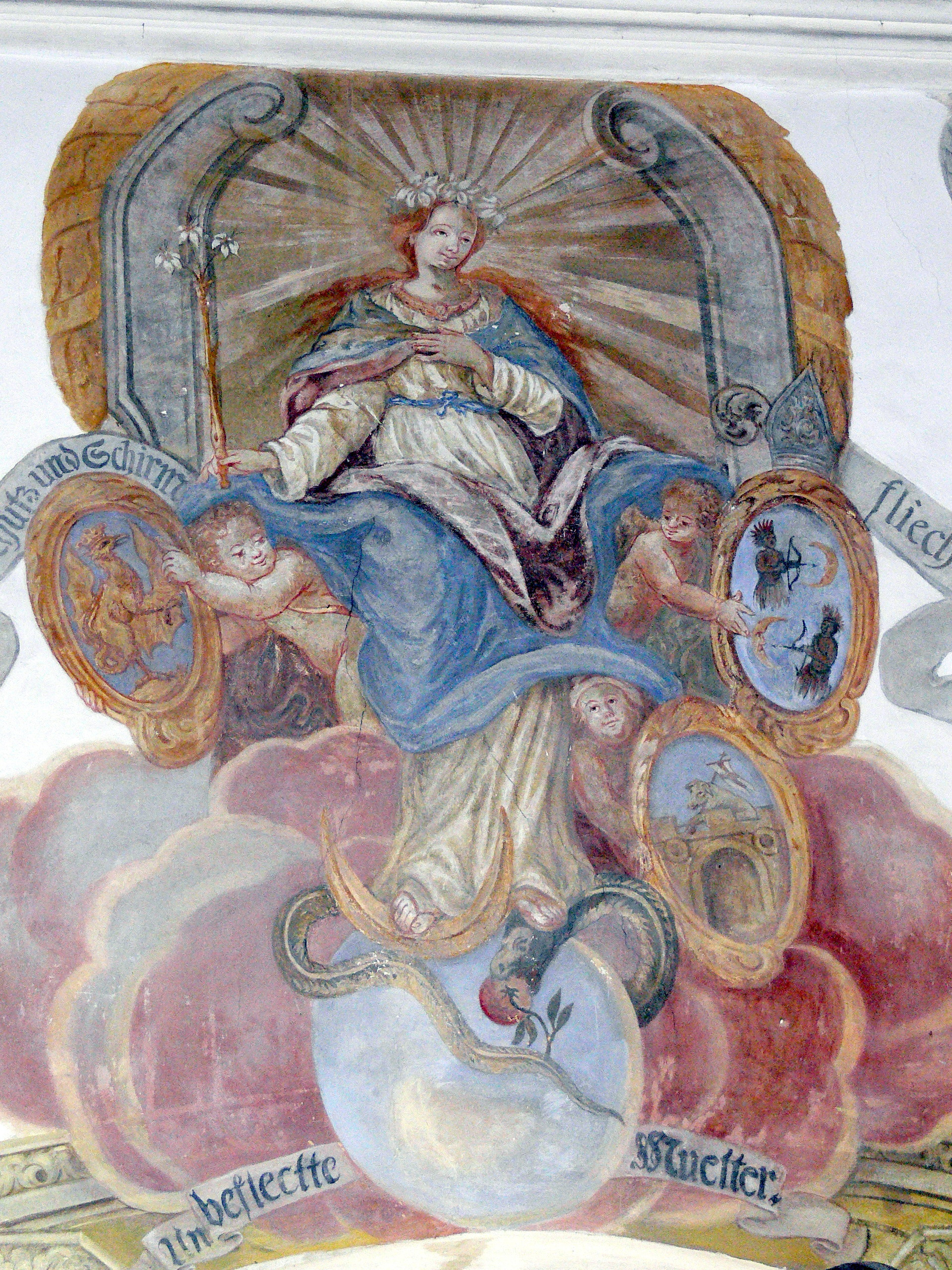
Our Lady's chapel in Altenmarkt. Fresco illustrating the Lauretan litany "Mary, you refuge of sinners".

Refugium Peccatorum (Latin for Refuge of Sinners), also known as Our Lady of Refuge, is a title for the Blessed Virgin Mary in the Catholic Church. Its use goes back to Saint Germanus of Constantinople in the 8th century.

== Catholic tradition ==
In the Catholicism, Eve is understood responsible for the suffering of humanity due to her and Adam’s fall and expulsion from paradise, while the Virgin Mary is viewed as the source of all healing. She is the "New Eve” (Latin: Nova Eva), who cannot eliminate the damage created by Eve, only limit it. Her fullness of grace, her position among the disciples of Christ, and her title as Mother of God are seen as assurances the Virgin Mary is a powerful intercessor.

=== Prayer ===
Refugium Peccatorum is one of four Marian advocations in the Litany of Loreto, the others being Salus Infirmorum (Health of the Sick), Consolatrix Afflictorum (Comforter of the Afflicted), and Auxilium Christianorum (Help of Christians). Each title extols Mary’s role as advocate for spiritual and corporeal mercy has a rich history, and the general notion of Marian intercession in temporal needs dates back to Church Fathers such as Justin Martyr, Irenaeus and Ambrose of Milan.

=== Community ===
The Archconfraternity of the Immaculate Heart of Mary, Refuge of Sinners was established at Notre-Dame-des-Victoires in the 19th century, and spread throughout the world.

=== Art ===
The 18th-century Jesuit preacher Antonio Baldinucci had a particular devotion to the Refugium Peccatorum image of Virgin Mary in the Church of the Gesu (Frascati) in Italy and commissioned a copy which he considered miraculous and carried it with him in his travels. The Jesuits spread copies of the image of this Madonna of Refuge in Mexico by the 19th century, and it began to be depicted in missions there, often with clouds surrounding the lower portion of the image of the Virgin Mary holding the Child Jesus.

In some 19th-century images, biblical scenes are included below the image of the Madonna, e.g. Peter's visions as well as the depiction of a safe harbor (Psalm 108:30).

The term "Refugium peccatorum" is also used other works of Roman Catholic Marian art. For instance, there is a marble statue representing the Virgin Mary, on the grand staircase of the old municipal palace in Venice, Italy. The name came from the fact that the convicts were allowed to stop before the Virgin Mary's statue and pray for their souls on their way to execution.

== Feast ==
The traditional feast day of Our Lady, Refuge of Sinners is August 13. In Mexico, the feast day is observed on July 4. She is the patroness of California, where the (arch)dioceses there celebrate the feast on July 5.

== Apparitions ==
Our Lady of Laus, which the Vatican approved in 2008, is named Refuge of Sinners because she asked for the conversion of sinners.

== Gallery ==
A 19th-century depiction with biblical scenes

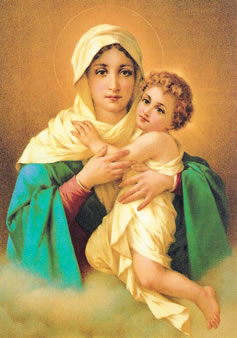
Refugium Peccatorum Madonna by Luigi Crosio

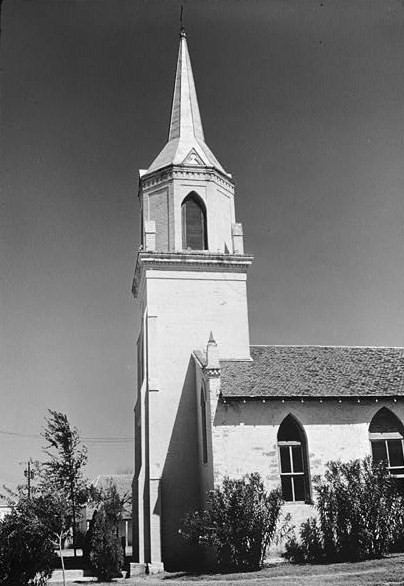
Our Lady of Refuge of Sinners church
Roma, Texas (1853, still existing)
