= Maria Gramegna =

Italian mathematician (1887–1915)

Maria Paola Gramegna (1887–1915) was an Italian mathematician and a student of Giuseppe Peano. Her work with Peano on systems of linear differential equations has been cited as an important early milestone in the history of functional analysis and its transition from working with concrete matrices to more abstract basis-independent formulations of linear algebra. After becoming a schoolteacher, she died in the 1915 Avezzano earthquake.

== Early life and education ==
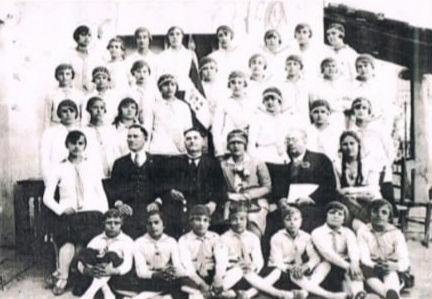
Students and teachers at the "Maria Clotilde di Savoia" Royal Normal and Complementary School for Girls in Avezzano, Abruzzo, in the early 1900s

Gramegna was born on 11 May 1887 in Tortona, the youngest of five children of a pasta factory owner. After studying mathematics in high school in Voghera with Giuseppe Vitali, she was admitted to the University of Turin in 1906, where she became a student of Peano. She completed her mathematics degree in 1910, with the thesis Serie di equazioni differenziali lineari ed equazioni integro-differenziali [Series of linear differential equations and integro-differential equations], supervised by Peano. Peano also presented this work to the Academy of Sciences of Turin.

== Later life ==
Immediately after finishing her mathematics degree, she also earned a diploma from the mathematics section of the university's school of education, with a second thesis, Area della zona sferica e della sfera [Area of the spherical zone and of the sphere]. With this credential, she became a high school teacher in Avezzano. She began there in 1910 as a substitute mathematics teacher at the normal school, won a competition for a permanent position as extraordinary mathematics teacher in 1912, and directed the associated boarding school for 1912–1913. During this period she also published on the history of mathematics.

She was killed by the 1915 Avezzano earthquake, on 13 January 1915.

== Recognition ==
Minor planet 37840 Gramegna, discovered in 1998 by the San Vittore Observatory, was named in honor of Gramegna.
