= Formulario mathematico =

Book by Giuseppe Peano

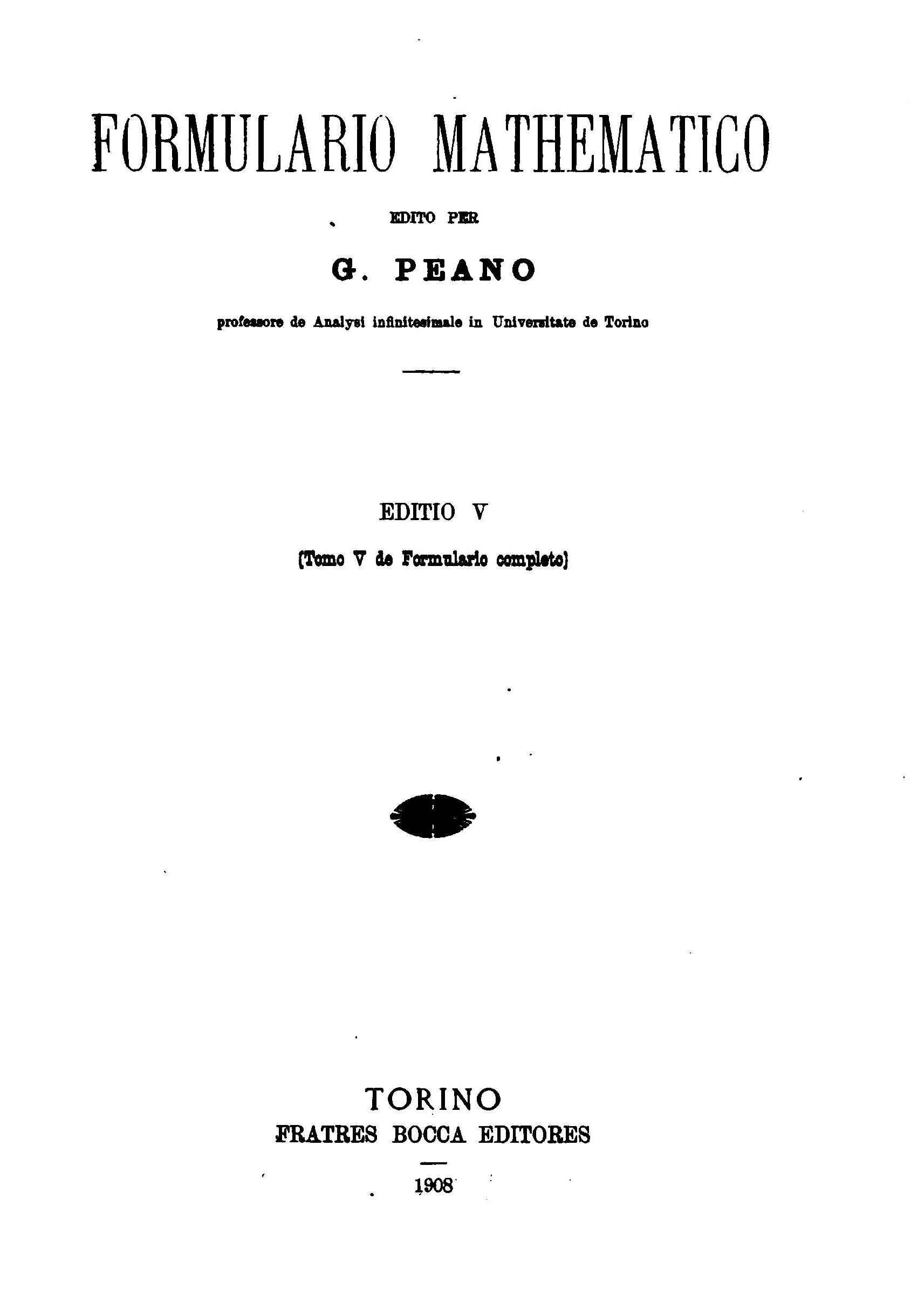
Formulario Mathematico

Formulario Mathematico (Latino sine flexione: Formulary for Mathematics) is a book by Giuseppe Peano which expresses fundamental theorems of mathematics in a symbolic language developed by Peano. The author was assisted by Giovanni Vailati, Mario Pieri, Alessandro Padoa, Giovanni Vacca, Vincenzo Vivanti, Gino Fano and Cesare Burali-Forti.

The Formulario was first published in 1894. The fifth and last edition was published in 1908.

Nicolas Bourbaki described Peano's notation in the Formulario as "following current mathematical usage, and introducing many well-chosen abbreviating symbols, his language succeeded moreover in being fairly readable, ..."

Hubert Kennedy wrote "the development and use of mathematical logic is the guiding motif of the project". He also explains the variety of Peano's publication under the title:

the five editions of the Formulario [are not] editions in the usual sense of the word. Each is essentially a new elaboration, although much material is repeated. Moreover, the title and language varied: the first three, titled Formulaire de Mathématiques, and the fourth, titled, Formulaire Mathématique, were written in French, while Latino sine flexione, Peano's own invention, was used for the fifth edition, titled Formulario Mathematico. ... Ugo Cassina lists no less than twenty separately published items as being parts of the 'complete' Formulario!

Peano believed that students needed only precise statement of their lessons. He wrote:

Each professor will be able to adopt this Formulario as a textbook, for it ought to contain all theorems and all methods. His teaching will be reduced to showing how to read the formulas, and to indicating to the students the theorems that he wishes to explain in his course.

Such a dismissal of the oral tradition in lectures at universities was the undoing of Peano's own teaching career.
