= Volapükologist =

Person whose scientific interest is Volapük

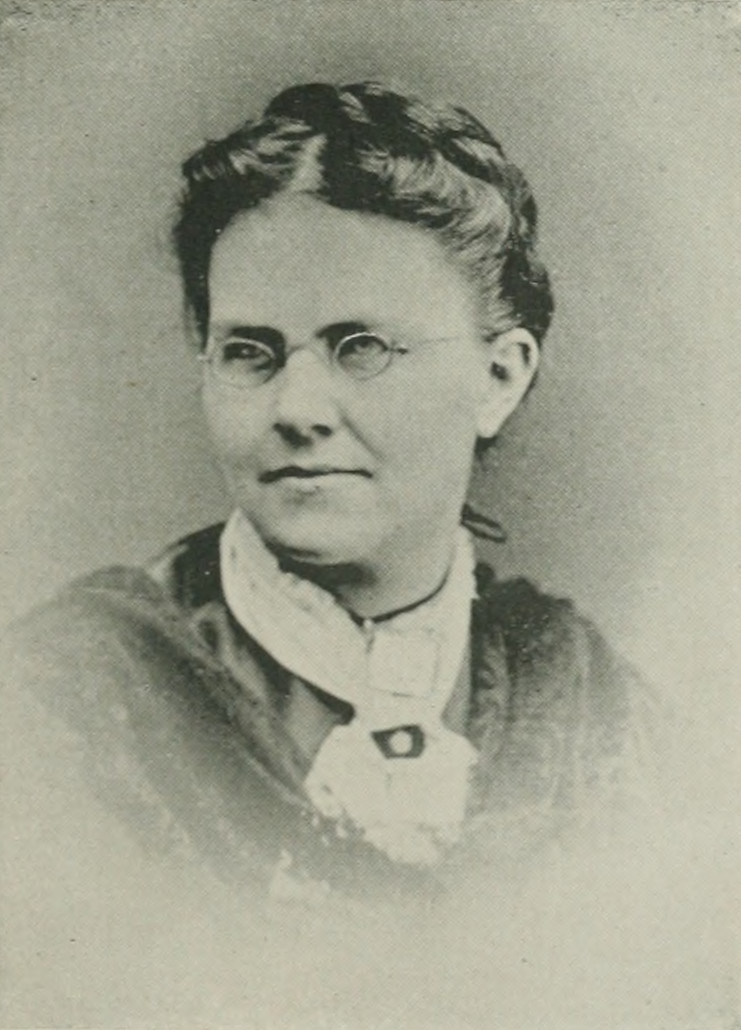
Louisa Dow Benton (1831–1895), an American volapükologist

A volapükologist (Volapük: volapükavan) is a person whose scientific interest is Volapük or who learns the language for hobby reasons.

There is a difference between a volapükologist and a volapükist. The latter can be defined as a person who joined the Volapük movement with the goal of promoting and disseminating Volapük as the international auxiliary language.

The language Volapük itself quickly acquired support after it appeared, both in Europe and America. There were three international congresses: the first in 1884 in Friedrichshafen, the second in 1887 in Munich and the third in 1889 in Paris. By 1889 there were 316 textbooks available in 25 languages, 283 clubs and around 25 magazines. In 1887 the American Philosophical Society established a commission for the evaluation of the scientific value of Volapük. It can be said that at the end of the 19th century there were nearly a million volapükists in the world.

But shortly after the biggest and most successful Paris congress the movement divided into factions and most of its supporters took up new languages, like Idiom Neutral and Esperanto. Although today there are still some people who learn and/or speak the language, they do it for philological and interlinguistical reasons rather than with the notion that Volapük might become a world auxiliary language. Consequently, it can be said that today there are no volapükists anymore—only volapükologists. Nevertheless, the Volapük movement still exists, and is governed by the International Volapük Academy.

== Contemporary volapükologists ==
- Brian Reynold Bishop
- Jean-Claude Caraco
- André Cherpillod
- Michael Everson
- Reinhard Haupenthal
- Sérgio Meira
- Ralph Midgley
- Hermann Philipps
- Arden R. Smith

== Historic volapükologists ==
- William M. Ampt
- Louisa Dow Benton
- Søren Brandt
- J. Hanno Deiler
- Karl Dornbusch
- Heinrich Hain
- A. Heijligers
- Samuel Huebsch
- I. Iwanowitch
- Arie de Jong
- Auguste Kerckhoffs
- Rupert Kniele
- Louis A. Lambert
- Klas August Linderfelt
- Hans Moser
- Arthur Naether
- W. Pflaumer
- Jean-Baptiste Pinth
- John Rellye
- A. Scherzinger
- Johann Martin Schleyer
- Johann Schmidt
- Hugo Schuchardt
- Charles Ezra Sprague
- A. Toussaint
- M. Vero
- J.M. Vos
- Marshall Wood
