= Cornelia Dow =

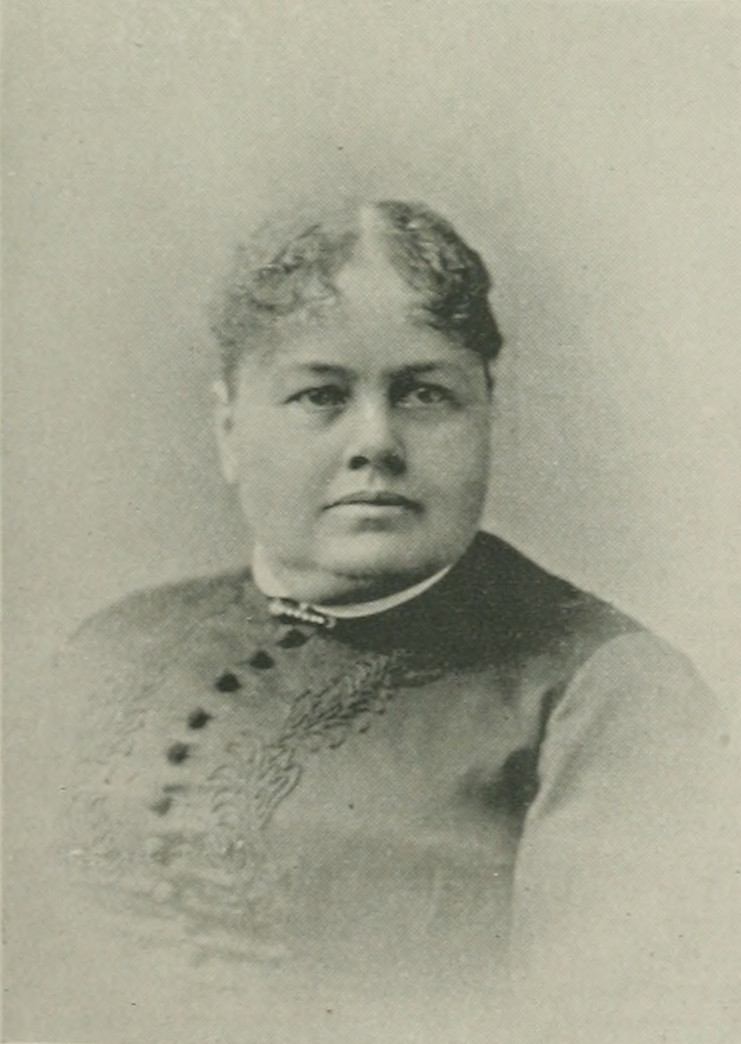
- Portrait from A Woman of the Century
- Born: Cornelia Maria Dow; November 10, 1842; Portland, Maine, U.S.
- Died: October 12, 1905 (aged 62); Portland, Maine
- Occupations: Philanthropist; Temperance worker
- Organizations: Woman's Christian Temperance Union
- Father: Neal Dow
- Relatives: Frederick Neal Dow & Louisa Dow Benton (siblings)

Cornelia Maria Dow (November 10, 1842 – October 12, 1905) was an American philanthropist and temperance leader, interested in charitable, philanthropic, and reformatory work in her home state of Maine. She was affiliated with the Woman's Christian Temperance Union (W.C.T.U.), as well as the Portland, Maine Home for Aged Women, and the Temporary Home for Women and Children.

== Early life and education ==
Cornelia Maria Dow (Note: Wait (2002) and Familysearch.org record Cornelia's middle name as Maria. Cherrington (1924) records Cornelia's middle name as Maynard.) was born in Portland, Maine, November 10, 1842. She was the youngest daughter of Neal Dow, of early Prohibition fame, and inherited from him a sympathy with the cause. Her mother, Maria Cornelia Durant Maynard (1808–1883) was born in Boston, Massachusetts. Her siblings included Emma Maynard Dow, Frederick Neal Dow, and Louisa Dow Benton. She was educated in the Girls’ High School of Portland, and the Friends’ School (now Moses Brown School) of Providence, Rhode Island.

== Career ==
Dow was for many years president of the Portland W.C.T.U., and the Cumberland County, Maine W.C.T.U. She also served as corresponding secretary of the Maine W.C.T.U., as well as state vice-president. The range of her sympathies included the poor and unfortunate of every class, and her life was spent in personal and social ministries. She was treasurer of the Portland Home for Aged Women, and also of the Temporary Home for Women and Children, the latter a State institution located at Portland. When the Star in the East, the official organ of the Maine W.C.T.U., was in danger of suspension, Dow became its business manager and through her efforts, made it successful. She was a constant attendant upon the gatherings of the National W.C.T.U., where her own abilities as well as the name and fame of her father made her prominent and influential. In her connection with the work of the W.C.T.U., Dow was the close friend and companion of Lillian M. N. Stevens, the national head of the W.C.T.U.

== Personal life ==
In religion, she was a member of the State Street Congregational Church in Portland. Later, she became a member of the Second Parish Congregational Church.

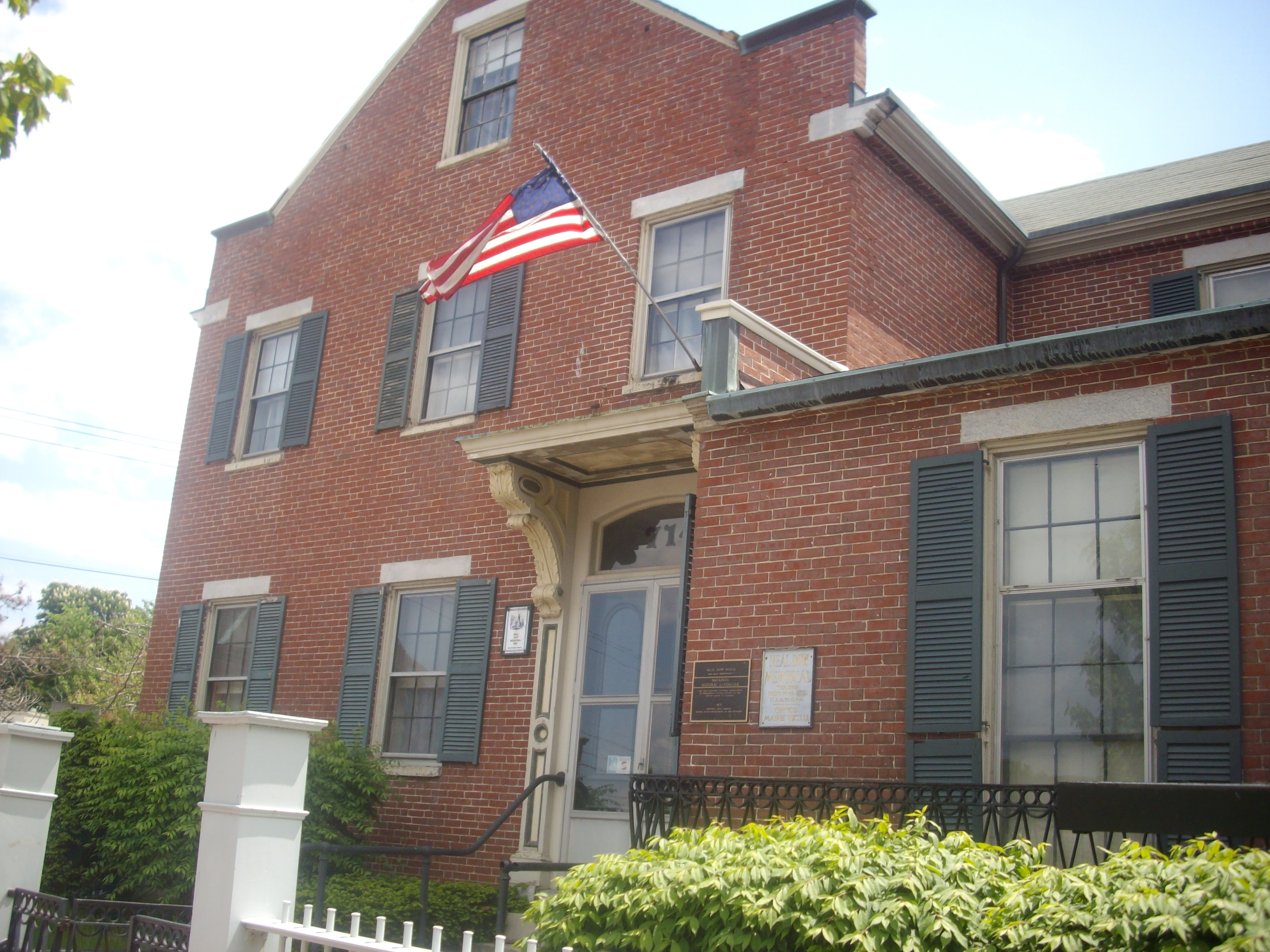
Neal Dow House

When her mother, through the infirmities of age, was compelled to give up the responsibilities of housekeeping, Cornelia took her place at home and presided over the household until the death of her father in 1897. After the death of her mother, she devoted herself to her father as long as he lived and, upon his death, made her home in the house where she was born. Dow had been confined to her home in Portland for about six weeks before her death there, aged 62, from undisclosed causes, on October 12, 1905.
