= Sigmund Spielmann =

Austrian Volapükist

- Born: 3 September 1862
- Occupation: Volapükist

Sigmund Spielmann was an Austrian Volapükist. He received his Volapük teacher's diploma in 1887.

== Works ==
- 1887. Volapük-Almanach für 1888, verfasst von Sigmund Spielmann. I. Jahrgang. Lekaled volapüka plo yel balmil jöltum jölsejöl, pelautöl fa Spielmann Sigmund. Yelüp balid. Leipzig: Mayer. (Vödem rigädik.)
- 1888. (Dab. 4id, pärevidöl ä pägretükumöl) Die Weltsprache Volapük in drei Lectionen. Leipzig: Mayer.
- 1889. M.b.p.b. Volapük-Almanach / Lekaled Volapüka plo yel balmil jöltum jölsezül fa Spielmann Sigmund. Yelüp telid. Leipzig: Mayer.

== Literature ==
- Haupenthal, Reinhard. 1982. Volapük-Bibliographie. Hildesheim, Zürich, New York: Georg Olms Verlag. (Päpüböl kobü dabükot nulik ela Volapük die Weltsprache ela Schleyer.)
- Kniele, Rupert. 1889. Das erste Jahrzehnt der Weltsprache Volapük. Verlag von A. Schoy, Buchhandlung, Ueberlingen a. B. (Dönu päpübon ün 1984 fa Reinhard Haupenthal, Saarbrücken: Editions Iltis.) (Vödem rigädik, ma dabükot balid).
- Sigmund Spielmann. 1887. Volapük-Almanach für 1888, verfasst von Sigmund Spielmann. I. Jahrgang. Lekaled volapüka plo yel balmil jöltum jölsejöl, pelautöl fa Spielmann Sigmund. Yelüp balid. Leipzig: Mayer. (Vödem rigädik.)
