= Rupert Kniele =

German proponent of Volapük, a constructed language

Rupert Kniele (1844–1911) was a German volapükist and volapükologist. He wrote the first history of the Volapük movement (German: Das erste Jahrzehnt der Weltsprache Volapük, English: The First Decade of the World Language Volapük) in 1889. He was the head for Württemberg, and the president of the Württemberg Land Federation for Volapük.

After the crisis of the first Volapük movement (in the time of the Paris conference) he remained loyal to Johann Martin Schleyer and his version of the language against that of Auguste Kerckhoffs; however, after several years he began to side with the second, and even to propose, a compromise grammar. He left the Volapük movement in 1895; after that time, he was never involved with universal languages.

== Works ==
- 1884. Weltsprachliche Humoristika. Eine Sammlung kurzer Scherze, Witze etc. Deutsch und weltsprachlich. Zugleich Übungsbuch in der Weltsprache, 'volapük'. Überlingen: Feyel.
- 1884. Der erste Kongress der Weltsprache-Freunde. Allmendingen. (Dönu päpübon ün 1984 in: Der erste Volapük-Kongreß. Friedrichshafen, August 1884. La unua Volapük-kongreso. Friedrichshafen, Aŭgusto 1884. Dokumente und Kommentare. Dokumentoj kaj Komentoj. Saarbrücken: Iltis.)
- 1885.Deutsch-weltsprachliche Handelskorrespondenz. 200 kaufmännische Briefe in 10 verschiedenen Gattungen. Überlingen: Feyel.
- 1886a. Weltsprache-Kalender für das Jahr 1886. Verf. von R[upert] Kniele. Konstanz: Schleyer. (Dönu pepüböl ün 1986, kobü pospenäd, fa Reinhard Haupenthal, ma dabükot balid; Saarbrücken: Editions Iltis.)
- 1886b. Der erste württembergische Weltspracheverein. Seine Entstehung und Entwicklung. In Kniele 1886a (dabükot 2id, 1986: 36–46).
- 1887. Vortrag des Herrn Obervorstandes und vpa.-plofed's Kniele Rupert, gehalten bei der 5. Generalversammlung des Württ. Weltsprachevereins am 1. Mai in Stuttgart. In: Bericht aus württ. Blättern... 1887, pads: 6–17.
- 1887. Öffentlicher Vortrag des Herrn Weltsprache-Obervorstandes und -Plofed's Rupert Kniele über die Ausbreitung der Weltsprache Volapük gelegentlich der fünften Generalversammlung des ersten württembergischen Weltsprachevereins in Stuttgart am 1. und 2. Mai 1887. Konstanz a.B.: Schleyer.
- 1888. Schleyer's Heim und seine ersten Schüler. In: Rund um die Welt, 1888/89, nüm: 9, pads: 129–139; nüm: 10, pads: 148–150.
- 1888?. Herr Leopold Einstein und La lingvo internacia. Überlingen: Feyel.
- 1888?. Ein offenes Wort zu den Münchener Vorgängen. I-IV. Überlingen: Feyel.
- 1888?. Spodel tedelik Volapüka. (Dabükot rigädik jiniko peperon. Dabinons tradutods kil: ini Linglänapük fa hiel G. Krause, ini Litaliyänapük fa hiel T. Villani, ed i jiniko ini Svedänapük fa hiel G. Liedbeck.)
- 1889. Das erste Jahrzehnt der Weltsprache Volapük. Verlag von A. Schoy, Buchhandlung, Ueberlingen a. B. (Dönu päpübon ün 1984 fa Reinhard Haupenthal, Saarbrücken: Editions Iltis.) (Vödem rigädik, ma dabükot balid).

== Literature ==
- Haupenthal, Reinhard. 1982. Volapük-Bibliographie. Hildesheim, Zürich, New York: Georg Olms Verlag. (Päpüböl kobü dabükot nulik ela Volapük die Weltsprache ela Schleyer.)
- Haupenthal, Reinhard. 1989. Nachwort zum Neudruck. In Kniele (1889), dabükot balid fa Reinhard Haupenthal, pads: 133–149; Saarbrücken: Editions Iltis.
- Spielmann, Sigmund. 1887. Volapük-Almanach für 1888, verfasst von Sigmund Spielmann. I. Jahrgang. Lekaled volapüka plo yel balmil jöltum jölsejöl, pelautöl fa Spielmann Sigmund. Yelüp balid. Leipzig: Mayer. (Vödem rigädik.)
