= Portland Club =

Portland Club may refer to:

- Portland Club (London)
- Portland Club (Portland, Maine)
