= Louisa Dow Benton =

American linguist, translator, letter-writer, scholar

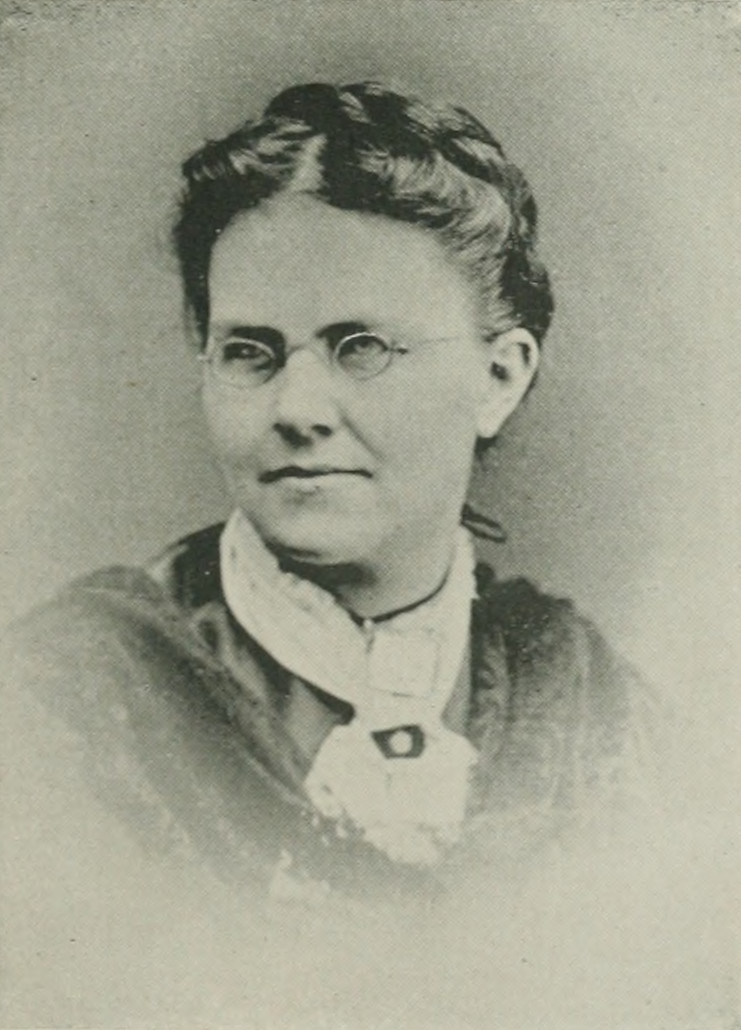
- Photo in A Woman of the Century
- Born: Louisa Dwight Dow; March 23, 1831; Portland, Maine, U.S.
- Died: December 7, 1895 (aged 64); Lancaster, New Hampshire, U.S.
- Education: Free Street Seminary
- Occupations: linguist; translator; letter writer; scholar
- Spouse: Jacob Benton (m. 1860; died 1892)
- Parent: Neal Dow
- Relatives: Frederick Neal Dow & Cornelia M. Dow (siblings)
- Writing career
- Language: English, Volapük
- Subject: Volapük

Louisa Dwight Benton (née Dow; March 23, 1831 – December 7, 1895) was a 19th-century American linguist, translator, and letter writer. She became physically disabled from rheumatism, unable to walk, and lost almost the entire use of her hands. She learned to read Italian, Spanish, German, Greek, and Russian without any instruction. Then she took up Volapük, and became well known as a Volapük scholar. She carried on correspondence with several linguists in Europe and associations for the spreading of this language.

== Early years and education ==
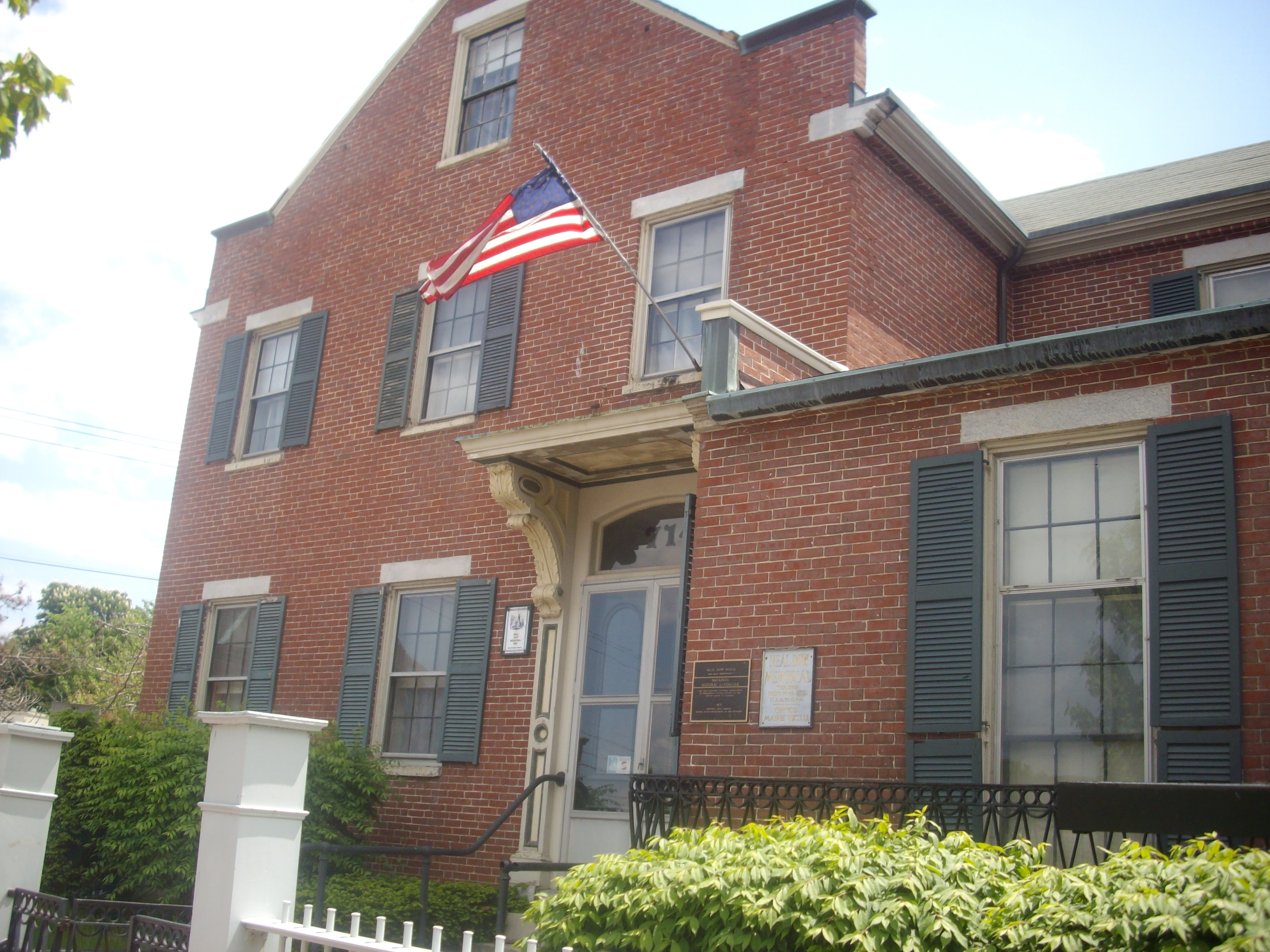
Neal Dow House in Portland, Maine.

Louisa Dwight Dow was born in Portland, Maine, March 23, 1831. She was the eldest child of General Neal Dow and Maria Cornelia Durant (Maynard) Dow. Her siblings included Emma Maynard Dow, Frederick Neal Dow, and Cornelia Maria Dow. She was educated in the best schools of Portland, the last and chief of which was the Free Street Seminary for Young Ladies, run by Master Hezekiah Packard. She had, besides these, teachers in French.

== Career ==
On December 12, 1860, she married Jacob Benton of Lancaster, New Hampshire. They passed four seasons in Washington, D.C., while Mr. Benton was a member of Congress, after which they resided at "Benton Manor" in Lancaster.

In the fall of 1887, she contracted rheumatism. She went several times to mineral springs in Canada, and to Hot Springs, Arkansas, but derived no benefit from any of them. Eventually, she could not walk or stand; she passed the time with reading books, writing, drawing and painting. Her hands and arms were so greatly and increasingly affected by the disease that she stopped drawing and painting, and devoted herself to the acquisition of languages, a study which was always especially attractive to her. She learned to read fluently Italian, Spanish, German, Greek and Russian, all with no teacher except for Greek. After that, she took up Volapük and mastered it easily. She was so well known as a Volapük scholar that correspondence came to her from several prominent linguists in Europe, and several European Volapük associations elected her corresponding member.

== Personal life ==
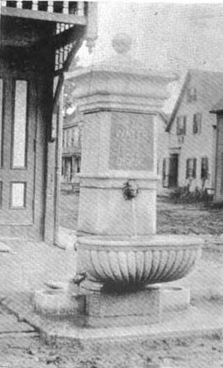
Benton Fountain

Benton designed and gave a fountain to the town of Lancaster in memory of her husband, who died from the effects of an accident in late 1892. He had long been a resident of the town and had attained prominence as a lawyer, businessman and politician. This memorial fountain was erected on the corner of Main and Mechanic streets, directly in front of the doorway of the Town Hall building. It was inscribed with the following memorial: "In memory of Jacob Benton as a gift to the town this fountain was erected by his wife Louisa D. Benton, on the day of his death, September 29, 1892."

Louisa Dow Benton died at her home in Lancaster, New Hampshire, on December 7, 1895, following cancer surgery.
