= Margaret Hutchins =

American librarian and educator (1884–1961)

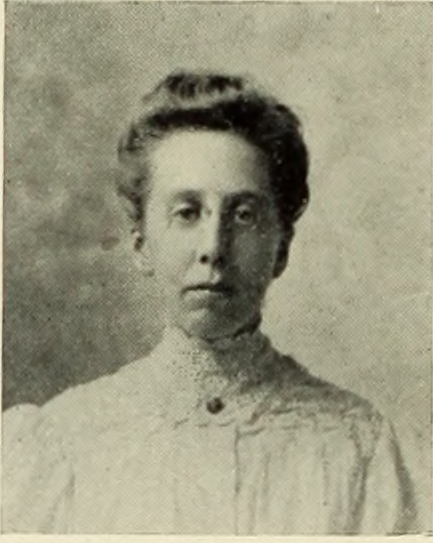
- Hutchins in 1906
- Born: September 21, 1884; Lancaster, New Hampshire, US
- Died: January 4, 1961 (aged 76); Bay Shore, New York, US
- Education: Smith College (BA), University of Illinois Urbana-Champaign (BLS), Columbia University (MLS)
- Occupations: Librarian, educator
- Employer: Columbia University
- Known for: Early leader in the field of reference librarianship

Margaret Hutchins (September 21, 1884 – January 4, 1961) was an American librarian and educator who taught library science at Columbia University from 1931 to 1952. She specialized in reference librarianship.

== Life and career ==
Born into a well-to-do family in Lancaster, New Hampshire, Hutchins earned a BA degree in Greek and philosophy with honors from Smith College in 1906, a BLS with honors from the University of Illinois Urbana-Champaign in 1908, and a MLS from Columbia University in 1930. Supervised by Isadore Mudge, her thesis examined British interlibrary loan practices.

Hutchins began her career at the University of Illinois as a reference assistant (1908–1912), a library assistant in the classics department (1912–1913), and a reference librarian (1913–1927). She taught summers at the Chautauqua Institution in 1926 and 1927, which led to her recruitment as first assistant and then superintendent of branch reference work at Queens Borough Public Library. In 1931, she joined the faculty of the School of Library Service at Columbia University as an instructor, gaining promotions to assistant professor in 1935 and associate professor in 1946. She retired to her hometown in 1952.

Hutchins died at the Southside Hospital in Bay Shore, Long Island, at the age of 76.

== Influence and legacy ==
In a 1937 article in Library Quarterly, Hutchins became the first writer to describe how reference librarians conduct reference interviews by matching questions to types of reference material and then to specific titles. She coauthored Guide to the Use of Libraries: A Manual for College and University Students (H. W. Wilson, 1920), which went through five editions by 1935. Her most influential work, Introduction to Reference Work (American Library Association, 1944), became a leading textbook in the field, with six reprintings by 1959. She posited four categories of reference questions: (1) bibliographical, (2) biographical, (3) historical and geographical, and (4) current and statistical. Her approach emphasized methodology over memorization.

Her papers are held in the archives of the Columbia University Libraries.
