= Alcohol laws of Maine =

The alcohol laws of Maine regulate the sale and possession of alcohol in the state of Maine in the United States. Maine is an alcoholic beverage control state.

The serving of alcohol in the State of Maine is supervised by the State Liquor and Lottery Commission. The Commission consists of five members appointed by the Governor of Maine and confirmed by the Maine Legislature. They meet monthly to provide public oversight and review of the performance and operational activities of the Maine Bureau of Alcoholic Beverages and Lottery Operations (BABLO).

BABLO is responsible for regulating the business practices of the alcohol industry, for creating a favorable economic climate for the industry, and for prohibiting sales to minors. They also lease the State monopoly on the warehousing and distribution of distilled spirits and fortified wines; the lease was held by the Maine Beverage Company, which signed a 10-year lease in 2004. A new 10-year lease was awarded to Maine Beverage Company's subcontractor, Pine State Trading Co, that took effect on July 1, 2014. It is expected by officials that the new lease, designed to generate money to pay debt owed to Maine hospitals, will allow prices to be reduced on popular spirits. This is an attempt to prevent the loss of sales to New Hampshire, which has lower prices and no sales tax.

The Maine Department of Public Safety, through the Maine State Police's Liquor and Licensing Division, is responsible for licensing the manufacture, importation, storage, transportation and sale of all liquor. They also administer those laws relating to licensing and the collection of taxes on malt liquor and wine.

Title 28-A of the Maine Revised Statutes contains the laws and rules regulating liquor.

== Sales restrictions ==
=== Time and practices ===
Alcohol may be sold between the hours of 5 a.m. and 1a.m. of the next calendar day. On New Year's Day, alcohol may be sold until 2 a.m. It may be consumed in establishments licensed for on-premises consumption until 1:15 a.m., with the exception of New Year's Day when it is 2:15 a.m.

Alcohol sales were previously prohibited until 9 a.m. on Sundays. In 2013 an exception was made to allow sales starting at 6 a.m. when St. Patrick's Day falls on a Sunday. In 2015 the legislature revised the law again to allow sales on any Sunday starting at 5 a.m., the same as every other day of the week.

It is illegal to distribute alcoholic beverages for free and to serve a customer more than two beverages at a time. Practices designed to get customers to drink more, such as drinking games, are prohibited, as is the awarding of drinks as prizes.

=== Place ===
Sales of Alcohol were once only permitted from state-owned stores, but the laws establishing the stores were repealed in 1991 and the stores gradually closed. Privately owned stores now obtain licenses to operate as "Agency Liquor Stores". Establishments selling liquor may not be within 300 feet of an existing school or church unless a public hearing is held near the proposed location of the establishment, or the establishment is in a downtown area.

Liquor may be sold from mobile carts on golf courses.

=== Advertising ===
Maine law changed in 2014 to allow bars to display the alcohol content of their beverages. Previously, bars were not permitted to display the alcohol content (though they could state it verbally) or to use certain phrases such as "high test" or "high proof" in a display. The original reasoning behind the law, passed post-Prohibition in 1937, argued that if bars displayed the strength of their liquor, consumers would drink more of it. Modern establishments stated that giving consumers such information helps them to better control their alcohol consumption. After bars pressured the Legislature in February 2014 to attempt to repeal the law, Director Reid of BABLO rewrote enforcement policy to state that merely listing the alcohol content would not be punished, though it still will be if the listing is embellished with descriptive language. The law was repealed on April 8, 2014, without Governor Paul LePage's signature, thus allowing bars and restaurants to list the alcohol content of their beverages on menus and signs.

Advertisements for liquor in media must be approved by BABLO, and it is prohibited to use an image of the Maine State House in liquor advertising.

== Drinking age ==
The legal age to purchase and consume alcohol in Maine is 21, which was instituted in 1987. Maine state law requires carding anyone who appears to be 30 years of age or younger. Minors may consume alcohol at home in the presence of the minor's parents. Minors may not transport liquor unless required due to the minor's employment, or at the request of their parent, guardian, or custodian.

== Taxes ==
Taxes on liquor at store level are included within the price and calculated by BABLO in order to raise enough money to cover their expenses and generate money for the State General Fund at an amount at least equal to that of the previous year.

In addition, per-gallon excise taxes are also levied on the manufacture and sale of liquor. The amount varies depending on the type of liquor.

== Local laws ==
Municipalities in Maine may, by local referendum, prohibit the sale of alcohol within the municipality and have been able to since the end of Prohibition in 1933. They may do so for both or either on and off-premises consumption. The most recent town to change its liquor laws was Sedgwick which voted at its March 13, 2013 town meeting to allow the sale of alcohol for on-premises consumption. In 2012, Cushing voted to allow the sale of alcohol. According to the State Police, there are still 56 dry towns in Maine.

== Driving ==
The legal Blood Alcohol Content limit (BAC) for drunk driving in Maine is .08%; however, a person may be charged with Operating Under the Influence (OUI) with any BAC above .00%, especially if supported by other evidence of impairment. According to Maine law, a person can be charged with OUI if a person is "impaired to the slightest." A BAC of .08% is simply considered Prima Facie evidence, or evidence that can stand on its own (and without further support by any other evidence) to secure a conviction in a Maine court. Teenage drivers may have no alcohol in their system. Maine also has an implied consent law, interpreting the refusal to submit to a breathalyzer test at the request of a police officer as failing such a test.

Drinking alcohol in a motor vehicle is prohibited. Carrying open containers of alcohol in a motor vehicle is also prohibited. One exception is in vehicles without trunks if the container is placed in an area not normally occupied by the driver or passenger, or behind the last upright seat in the vehicle. They are also permitted for passengers in vehicles for hire (except taxicabs), the living quarters of a mobile home, trailer, semitrailer, or truck camper, and in vehicles operated by a licensed caterer who is transporting the alcohol to or from an event.

== Boating and alcohol ==
Maine alcohol laws prohibit operating or attempting to operate a vessel under the influence of alcohol or drugs, or having a BAC of 0.08% or higher.

== Other ==
Persons under the influence of alcohol may not possess firearms in bars and restaurants. Such establishments also may, but are not required to, prohibit firearms from all customers in their establishment.

Liquor and public intoxication are not permitted in Maine state parks. Public intoxication and in some cases consumption are also not permitted in Acadia National Park per federal law.

Persons are guilty of public drinking when drinking liquor within 200 feet of a legible notice prohibiting the consumption of alcohol. This notice must be placed by an authorized person (property owner, law enforcement officer, etc.). Persons can also be personally forbidden from drinking in public by law enforcement officers.

== See also ==
- Maine law (or "Maine Liquor Law"), passed in 1851 in Maine
