= Woodfords Club =

Coordinates: 43°40′16″N 70°17′10″W

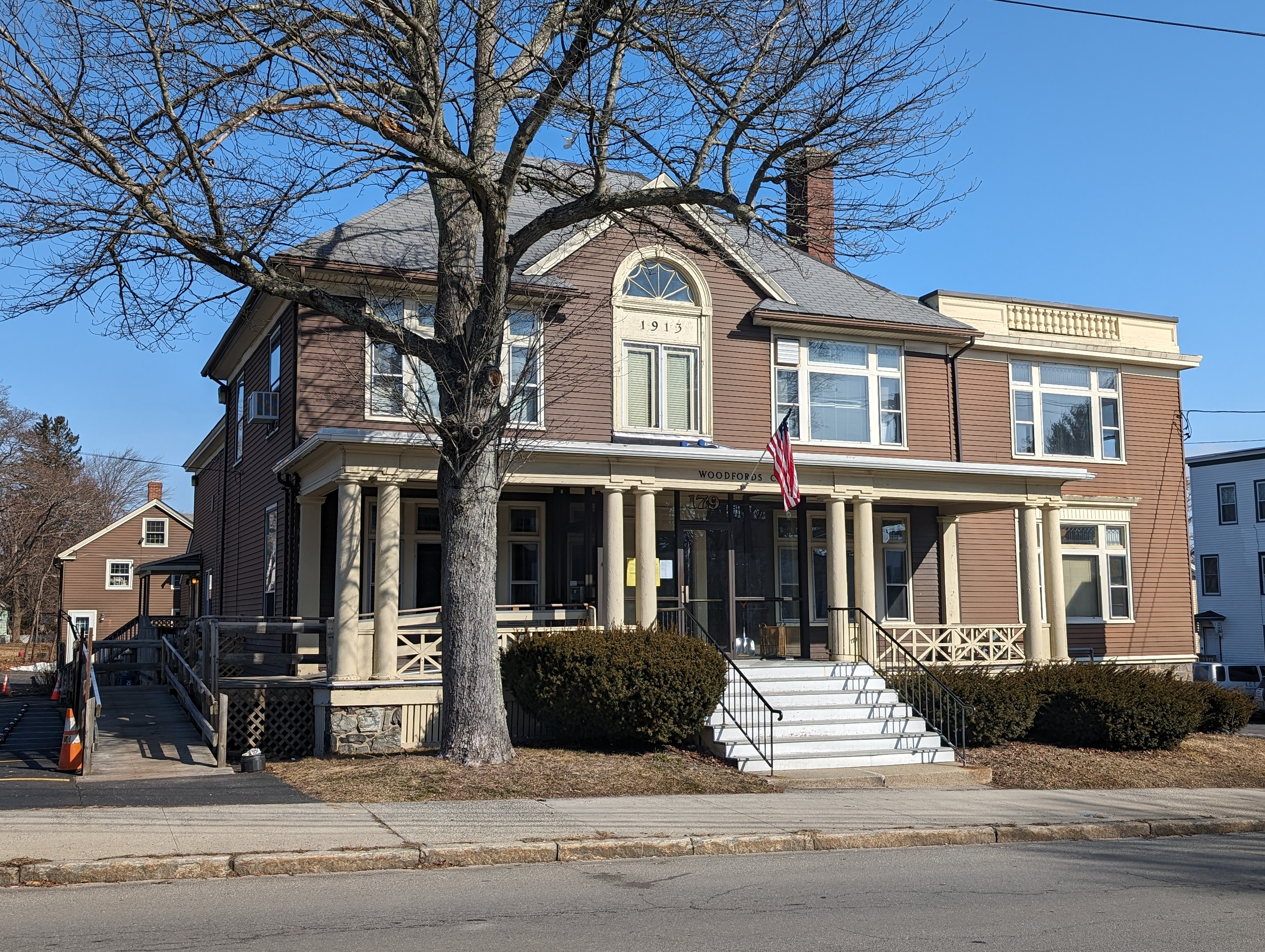
Woodfords Club, circa 2024.

Woodfords Club is a social club and event space in Portland, Maine. Organized on September 19, 1913, the clubhouse building was designed by architect John Calvin Stevens. The building officially opened in January 1914 amidst a housing boom in the area. Located in the suburban Woodfords Corner neighborhood, the club was organized as an elite male-only clubhouse similar to the more urban Portland Club and Cumberland Club. Members were wealthy, conservative businessmen, and public officials seeking space apart from their families. Activities in the building include billiards and a candlepin bowling alley in the basement. Among its earliest members were lawyers such as Harry L. Cram, businessman and future City Council chairman Neal W. Allen, Congressman Asher Hinds, and School Superintendent and future Ku Klux Klan leader DeForest H. Perkins.

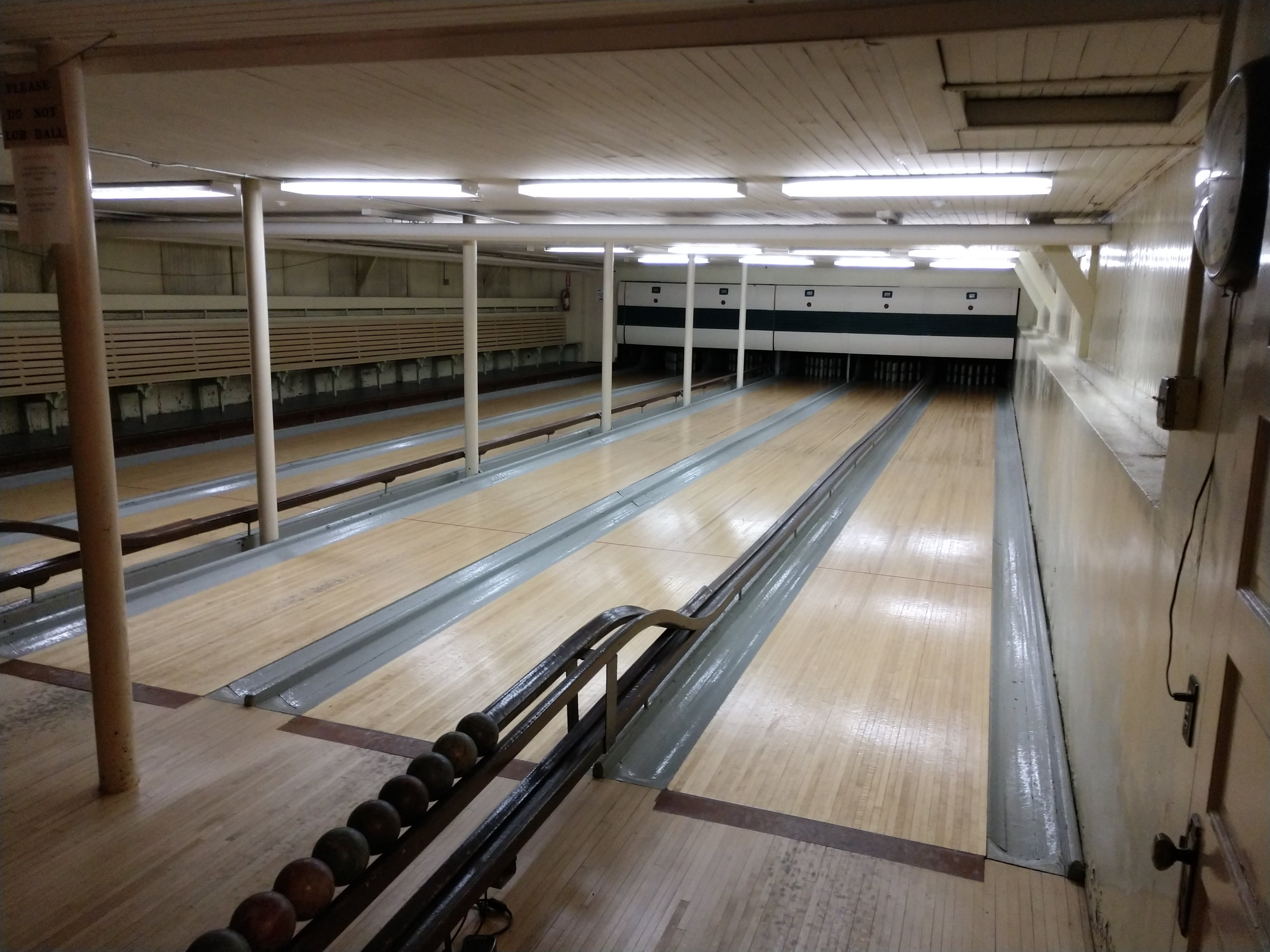
The basement of the Woodfords Club includes a five-lane bowling alley for club members.

The records of the woman's section of the Woodfords Club are held at the University of New England.
