= Neal Dow House =

Historic house in Maine, United States

- U.S. National Register of Historic Places
- U.S. National Historic Landmark
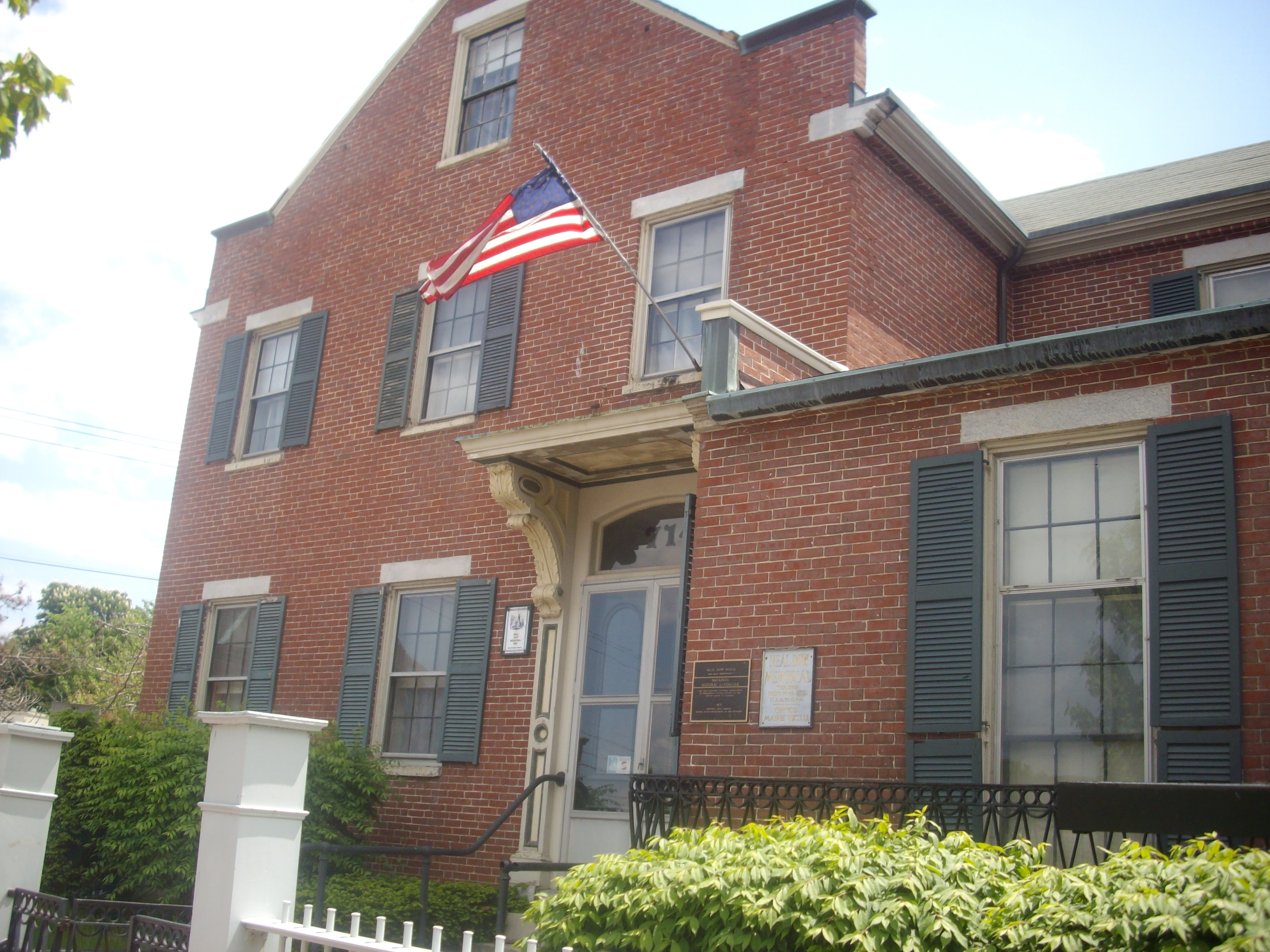
- Pictured in 2008

- Location within Maine Location within the United States
- Location: 714 Congress St., Portland, Maine
- Coordinates: 43°39′11″N 70°16′12″W
- Area: less than one acre
- Built: 1829
- Architectural style: Federal
- NRHP reference No.: 73000236

Significant dates
- Added to NRHP: April 11, 1973
- Designated NHL: May 30, 1974

The Neal Dow House, also known as Gen. Neal Dow House, is a historic house found at 714 Congress Street in Portland, Maine. It was built in 1829 for noted politician and prohibitionist Neal Dow (1804–1897), and was later designated a National Historic Landmark for that association. Dow was the author of the first prohibition law passed by the Maine legislature in 1851 (and giving such laws the epithet "Maine law"). He was known as a tireless, internationally known activist for the temperance movement. Dow's house was a center of activism in his lifetime, and is now the headquarters of the Maine chapter of the Women's Christian Temperance Union.

== Architecture and building history ==
The Dow house is a large, 2 1/2-story, 17-room brick structure with late Federal styling. It is roughly rectangular in shape, with three distinct sections. A main block, 2 1/2 stories in height and three bays wide, anchors the corner lot on which it stands. A 2 1/2-story ell extends to the right from the rear of this block, and there is a single-story flat-roof section in the crook of the L created by the two taller sections. The main entrance is in the right side bay of the main block, and is sheltered by a late-Victorian decorative hood.

The building was constructed in 1829, on the occasion of Neal Dow's marriage to Maria Maynard. It was Dow's home for 67 years, until his death at age 93 in 1897. The house was given by Dow's son Fred to the local chapter of the Women's Christian Temperance Union, along with a large number of Dow's possessions and related artifacts. Although the chapter went through a period of low activity, attempts were begun in 2013 to revive it after the state legalized the sale of marijuana. The house is open to the public at no charge on weekdays or by appointment.

== Significance ==
Neal Dow was born and raised in Portland to Quaker parents, and was an early advocate of temperance as well as a prominent local businessman. In 1829 he organized the Maine Temperance Union, and began to speak publicly in favor of the complete prohibition of alcohol. He won election as mayor of Portland in 1851, and immediately promoted the passage of a statewide prohibition law, which he was the author of. The law passed, bringing Dow a nationwide reputation, and labeling such laws in other states as "Maine laws". He traveled extensively throughout the country, speaking on behalf of the cause. During the American Civil War he served in the Union Army, rising to the rank of brigadier general. After the war he resumed his temperance activities, and also visited England, making common cause with temperance advocates there. In the 1880 presidential election he was a candidate for president on the Prohibition Party ticket, receiving about 10,000 votes. He remained active in the cause until his death. Biographer Frank Byrne credits Dow for paving the way, in terms of his principles, strategy, and tactics, for later temperance advocates.

Dow's house was listed on the National Register of Historic Places in 1973, and was designated a National Historic Landmark the following year.

== See also ==
- List of National Historic Landmarks in Maine
- National Register of Historic Places in Portland, Maine
