= Jacob Benton =

American politician (1814–1892)

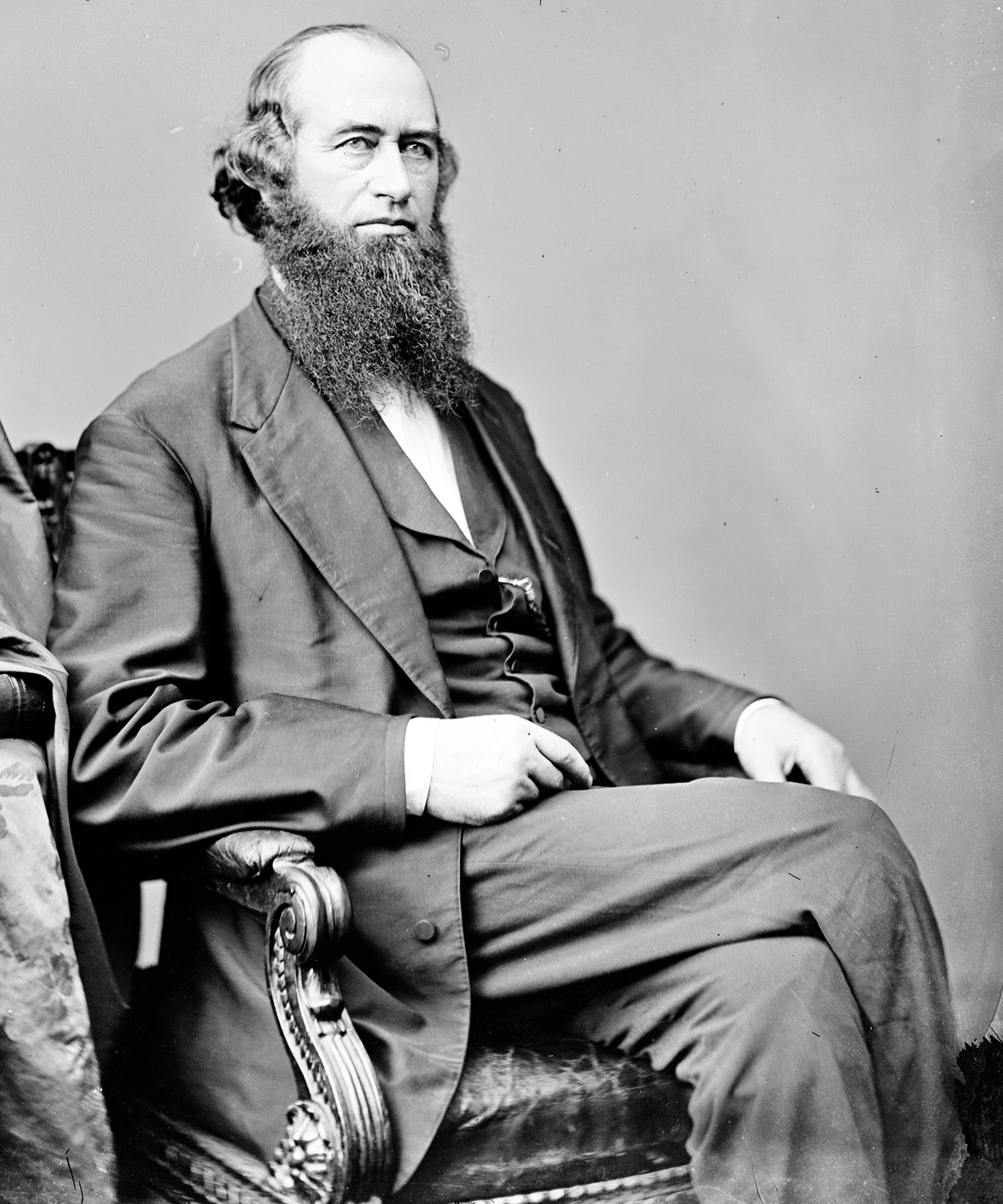

Member of the U.S. House of Representatives from New Hampshire's 3rd district
- In office March 4, 1867 – March 3, 1871
- Preceded by: James W. Patterson
- Succeeded by: Hosea Washington Parker

Member of the New Hampshire House of Representatives
- In office 1854-1856

Personal details
- Born: August 19, 1814 Waterford, Vermont
- Died: September 29, 1892 (aged 78) Lancaster, New Hampshire
- Resting place: Summer Street Cemetery, Lancaster, New Hampshire
- Citizenship: US
- Party: Republican
- Spouse: Louisa Dwight Benton
- Education: Burr and Burton Seminary
- Profession: Lawyer; Politician

Jacob Benton (August 19, 1814 – September 29, 1892) was an American politician, and a United States representative from New Hampshire.

== Early life ==
Born in Waterford, Vermont, Benton attended the common schools, Lyndon Academy, and Randolph Academy. He graduated from Burr and Burton Seminary at Manchester, Vermont, in 1839.

In 1841, Benton began to study law with Heaton and Reed in Montpelier, Vermont. He became principal of the academy at Concord Corner, Vermont, while continuing to study law with Henry A. Bellows of Littleton, New Hampshire. He moved to Lancaster, New Hampshire, in 1843, was admitted to the bar, and commenced practice in partnership with Ira Young.

== Career ==
Benton was a member of the New Hampshire House of Representatives 1854–1856. He also served as a delegate to the Republican National Convention in 1860.

Elected as a Republican to the Fortieth and Forty-first Congresses, Benton served as United States Representative for the third district of New Hampshire (March 4, 1867 – March 3, 1871) and declined to be a candidate for renomination in 1870. After leaving Congress, he resumed the practice of law.

== Death ==
Thrown from his carriage, Benton died in Lancaster, New Hampshire, on September 29, 1892 (age 78 years, 41 days). He is interred at Summer Street Cemetery, Lancaster, New Hampshire.

== Family life ==
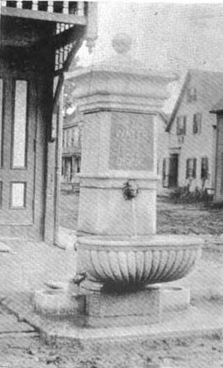
Benton Fountain in Lancaster, designed by Benton's wife, Louisa, in her husband's memory.

Benton was the son of Samuel S. and Esther Prouty Benton and married Louisa Dwight Dow in 1860.

U.S. House of Representatives
Preceded by James W. Patterson	U.S. Representative for the 3rd district of New Hampshire; 1867–1871	Succeeded by Hosea Washington Parker
