= Fred Dow =

American politician (1840–1934)

Frederick Neal Dow
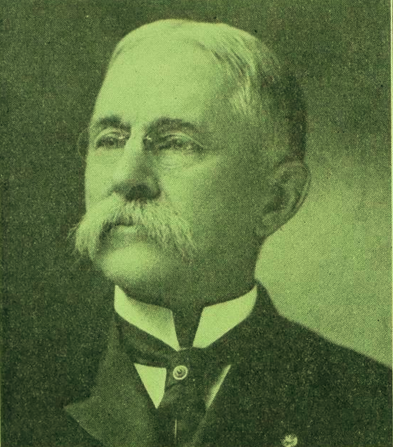

Member of the Maine House of Representatives

Member of the Maine House of Representatives
- In office 1888–1890

Speaker of the Maine House of Representatives
- In office 1889 – October 1890

Personal details
- Born: February 23, 1840 Portland, Maine
- Died: November 25, 1934 (aged 94) Portland, Maine
- Resting place: Evergreen Cemetery
- Party: Republican

Frederick Neal Dow (February 23, 1840 – November 25, 1934) was an American political activist and newspaper publisher from Portland, Maine. The son of Prohibitionist mayor and presidential candidate Neal Dow, Fred Dow served in a number of political positions during his lifetime, including in the Maine House of Representatives and as Collector of the Port of Portland. During his time in the House, he served as Speaker from 1889-1890. He helped found the Portland Club, an influential Republican all-male social club in Portland's West End. He also owned and served as editor of one of Portland's largest newspapers, the Evening Express, from 1887-1925.

== Early life ==
Frederick Dow was born to father Neal Dow and Maria Cornelia Durant (Maynard) Dow in Portland, Maine on December 23, 1840. His ancestors on his father side dated back to the early British colonists. His mother was of Huguenot descent. His siblings included Emma Maynard Dow, Louisa Dow Benton, and Cornelia Maria Dow.

He attended Portland Academy, Portland High School, and the Friends' School in Providence, Rhode Island. He left school at the age of 16 and entered the tanning business with his father. Dow volunteered to serve in the Maine militia at the outbreak of the Civil War, but was blocked by his politically powerful father from fighting. In October, 1864, he married Julia Dana.

== Politics ==
In 1871, Dow began his political career with an appointment to the staff of Republican governor Sidney Perham. From 1872-1874, he served as first a member and then chair of the Executive Council of Maine. For the 1874 election, he was unanimously nominated by the Cumberland, County Republicans for Maine Senate. However, he did not win a seat in that year's general election. Following the entire Republican ticket's defeat in 1875, Dow was elected to the Maine Republican Party's State Committee for Cumberland County. He was also appointed by governor Nelson Dingley Jr. as one of the Commissioners from Maine to the Centennial Exposition at Philadelphia. He served as a delegate at large to the Republican National Convention at Chicago in 1880 which nominated James Garfield and Chester Arthur as its ticket. Prior to the 1882 general election, Dow was elected as the successor to U.S. Senator James G. Blaine as chair of the Maine Republican State Committee. Following that election, one in which Republican nominee Frederick Robie took back the Governorship for his party, Dow's stature was raised within the party. As a result, Dow was appointed by now President Arthur to replace the recently deceased Lot M. Morrill as Collector of the Port of Portland, a highly prestigious and lucrative position. Following the defeat of the Republicans nationally in 1884, new President Grover Cleveland appointed a Democrat to the Collector position in 1885. Dow then turned his attention to building the Republican Party nationally through the creation of permanent social clubs. These included the Portland Club, which was only the second such club in the country. He was also the first President of the Maine State League of Republican Clubs. In 1886, Dow was nominated by the Republicans for a seat in the Maine House of Representatives, which he easily won. He was re-elected two years later. In 1889, he was elected Speaker of the Maine House of Representatives. Upon the election of Republican Benjamin Harrison to the presidency in 1888, Dow declined the post of Collector until his term as Speaker ended. Following the September 1890 general election, Dow was re-appointed to the Collector position by Harrison.

== Death ==
Dow died in Portland, Maine on November 27, 1934 and is buried at Evergreen Cemetery.
