= Portland Club (Portland, Maine) =

Building in Portland, Maine, United States

- The Portland Club
- U.S. National Register of Historic Places
- U.S. Historic district – Contributing property
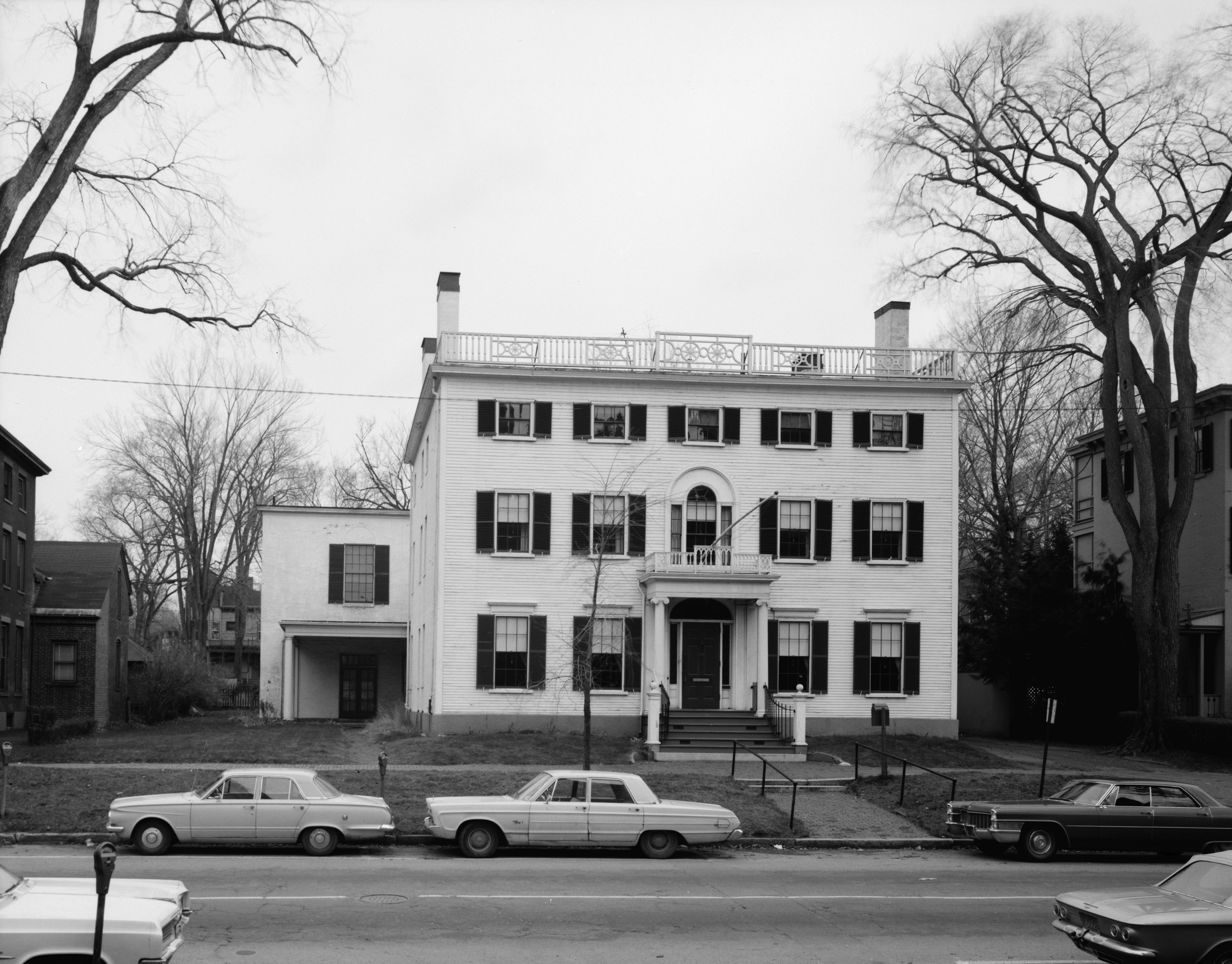
- Front of The Portland Club, 1969 HABS photo

- Location within Maine Location within the United States
- Location: 156 State Street, Portland, Maine
- Coordinates: 43°39′7″N 70°15′58″W
- Built: 1805
- Architect: multiple
- Part of: Spring Street Historic District (ID70000043)
- NRHP reference No.: 73000120

Significant dates
- Added to NRHP: January 25, 1973
- Designated CP: April 3, 1970

The Portland Club is a social club at 156 State Street in Portland, Maine. It operates as a 501(c)(3) Public Charity; in 2024, it claimed total revenue of $55,650 and total assets of $519,025.

== Services and facilities ==
The Portland Club is located in the Hunnewell-Shepley Mansion, on the south side of State Street, between Pine and Spring Streets, on the east side of Portland's West End. The Federal-style mansion was built in 1805 to a design by Alexander Parris, with later Colonial Revival updates by John Calvin Stevens. It has housed the club since 1921. The building is an important local work by Parris, a Boston architect who, under the direction of Joseph Ingraham, helped to define much of Portland's skyline with his beautiful structures. The building was listed on the National Register of Historic Places in 1973.

The Portland Club holds many meetings of social and political interest. The mansion itself is home to many paintings and antiques that are original to the club, along with over 12 antique mahogany pool tables on the second floor. The Portland Club was one of the first clubs to bring women into the organization as The Woman's Portland Club.

== History ==
The Portland Club began in 1886, after Fred N. Dow and a group of influential friends decided to organize their informal gatherings into a club. The men's purpose was to "discuss current events," and though never part of the by-laws, to promote the Republican Party agenda. Because Republicans controlled Maine's government, the club was widely recognized as the de facto seat of political power for decades. Another social club, Woodfords Club was formed in the burgeoning suburban neighborhoods of Portland in 1913. The club acquired the mansion in 1921 and has been the home of The Portland Club ever since.

== See also ==
- National Register of Historic Places listings in Portland, Maine
