= Maine Liquor Law =

1851 anti-liquor law

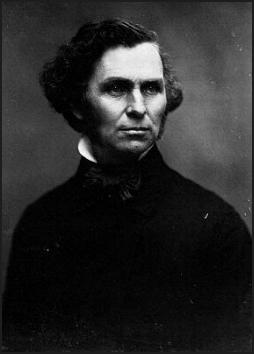
Neal Dow (1804 – 1897), mayor of Portland, Maine, was known as the Napoleon of Temperance

The Maine Liquor Law, often referred to as simply the Maine Law, passed on June 2, 1851 in Maine, was the first statutory implementation of the developing temperance movement in the United States.

== History ==
Temperance activist Neal Dow helped craft the Maine liquor law while he was mayor of Portland, Maine. The law's wording included that the sale of all alcoholic beverages except for "medicinal, mechanical or manufacturing purposes" was prohibited. Word of the law's passage quickly spread elsewhere in the nation, and by 1855 twelve states had joined Maine in total prohibition. Known as "dry" states, these states were the opposite of "wet" states, where no prohibition laws existed.

The act was unpopular with many working-class people and immigrants. Opposition to the law turned violent in Portland on June 2, 1855, during an incident known as the Portland Rum Riot. Opponents of the Maine Law stormed Portland City Hall because they thought Mayor Dow was keeping liquor in the basement. Newspapers reported that Dow ordered rioters to be fired upon, killing one and wounding seven. The riot was a contributing factor to the law being repealed in 1856. However, despite repeal, prohibition was re-enacted in various forms and eventually was written into the state constitution in 1885.

The Maine Law gained recognition internationally and was the inspiration for United Kingdom Alliance in Manchester, England. That organization grew and during the late 19th century a street in Manchester, England, was renamed Maine Road in honour of the law. Originally known as Dog Kennel Lane, the street was renamed due to the influence of the temperance movement in the United Kingdom. A 16.5 acre brickworks on the street was later redeveloped into Maine Road football stadium, where Manchester City F.C. played home games between 1923 and 2003.

== Other states ==
- "The Choctaw council, immediately after the tribe's migration, had enacted a law to prohibit the introduction of whisky which they claimed antedated the Maine law on the subject." (Grant Foreman, The Five Civilized Tribes, p78) The date must be in the early 1830s, to judge from a citation given by Foreman later in that chapter, to the New York Evangelist as copied in the Indian Advocate in October, 1852.
- In 1847 Delaware became the second state to pass an unenforced prohibitory liquor law by the legislature, but the people in Kent and Sussex Counties voted against it. Delaware's third county, New Castle, was the only to vote for it.
- The Massachusetts legislature passed a "Maine Law" in 1852 which was struck down a year later by that state's Supreme Court. Two years later, in 1855, the legislature passed a revised prohibitory liquor law to avoid the constitutional flaws of the first law.
- The Rhode Island General Assembly passed its own "Maine Law" in 1852, which outlawed sale or consumption of liquor for eleven years. Liquor was banned again in 1874 and 1886. When statewide prohibition finally ended in 1889, the decision was left to the individual cities and towns of Rhode Island whether to be "wet" or "dry".
- Vermont's legislature also passed a prohibitory liquor law in 1852 which was ratified by the people of the state the year after.
- Connecticut's legislature passed a prohibitory liquor law in 1853 but was vetoed by the governor. The next year, with a new governor, the legislature once again passed a "Maine Law" with a majority in both houses.
- In 1853, Indiana passed a "Maine Law" which was invalidated by the state's supreme court. But in 1855, a new prohibitory liquor law was passed.
- Also in 1853, Michigan passed a prohibitory liquor law which was ratified by 2/3 of the electorate. However, in 1854, the law was declared unconstitutional. The next year the state legislature passed a revised liquor law.
- In 1854, the people of Texas voted to prohibit the sale of liquor in quantities less than one quart.
- In 1854, Ohio passed a law "forbidding the sale of intoxicating liquor," which was ruled unconstitutional by state appellate courts. However, in 1855, the Ohio State Supreme Court overturned the lower court rulings and upheld the constitutionality of a statewide prohibitory liquor law.
- The New York state legislature passed a prohibitory liquor law in 1854, only to be vetoed by Governor Seymour. The same year, Governor Seymour was replaced by the prohibition candidate Myron H. Clark. Early the next year, the legislature re-passed the "Maine Law," though it had spotty enforcement.
- Pennsylvania's prohibitory liquor law went into effect in 1855 after its passage by the state legislature.
- 1855, the Iowa state legislature passed a "Maine Law" which was ratified by the people the same year.
- In 1855, the New Hampshire state Assembly overcame two previous rejections by the state Senate to pass a prohibitory liquor law.
- In 1880, under the Governorship of John St. John, the State of Kansas enacted a liquor prohibition law.

== See also ==
- Alcohol laws of Maine
- Oren B. Cheney
- Neal Dow
- John Hubbard
- Prohibition in the United States
