= William M. Ampt =

American lawyer

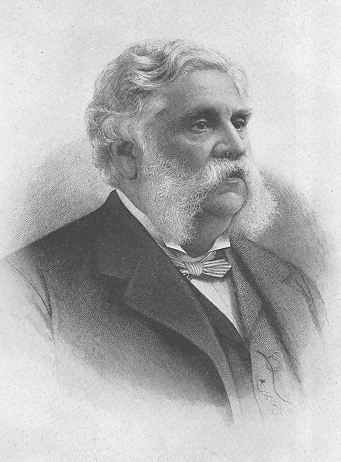
William M. Ampt

William M. Ampt, also known as Citizen Ampt for his "staunch views on the duties of a citizen", (February 1, 1840, in Trenton, Ohio – December 16, 1909, in Cincinnati, Ohio) was an American lawyer.

== Biography ==
He was born on February 1, 1840, in Trenton, Ohio, to Francis Ampt of Hesse-Darmstadt and Kunigunda Rosa of Bavaria.

After graduating from Oberlin College (as valedictorian) in 1862, he attended the Albany Law School and subsequently served as city solicitor of Lima, Ohio, and, from 1871 to 1873, as prosecuting attorney of Hamilton County, Ohio; after his term as prosecutor ended, he never ran for office again.

In 1870 he married Mary Eliza Gunckel.

In 1876, he played a role in the disputed presidential election, traveling to Florida, where he convinced electoral officers to reject votes from two pro-Tilden precincts in Hamilton County.

Ampt was also a proponent of the constructed language Volapük, and was one of the two American delegates to the 1889 international Volapük convention in Paris.

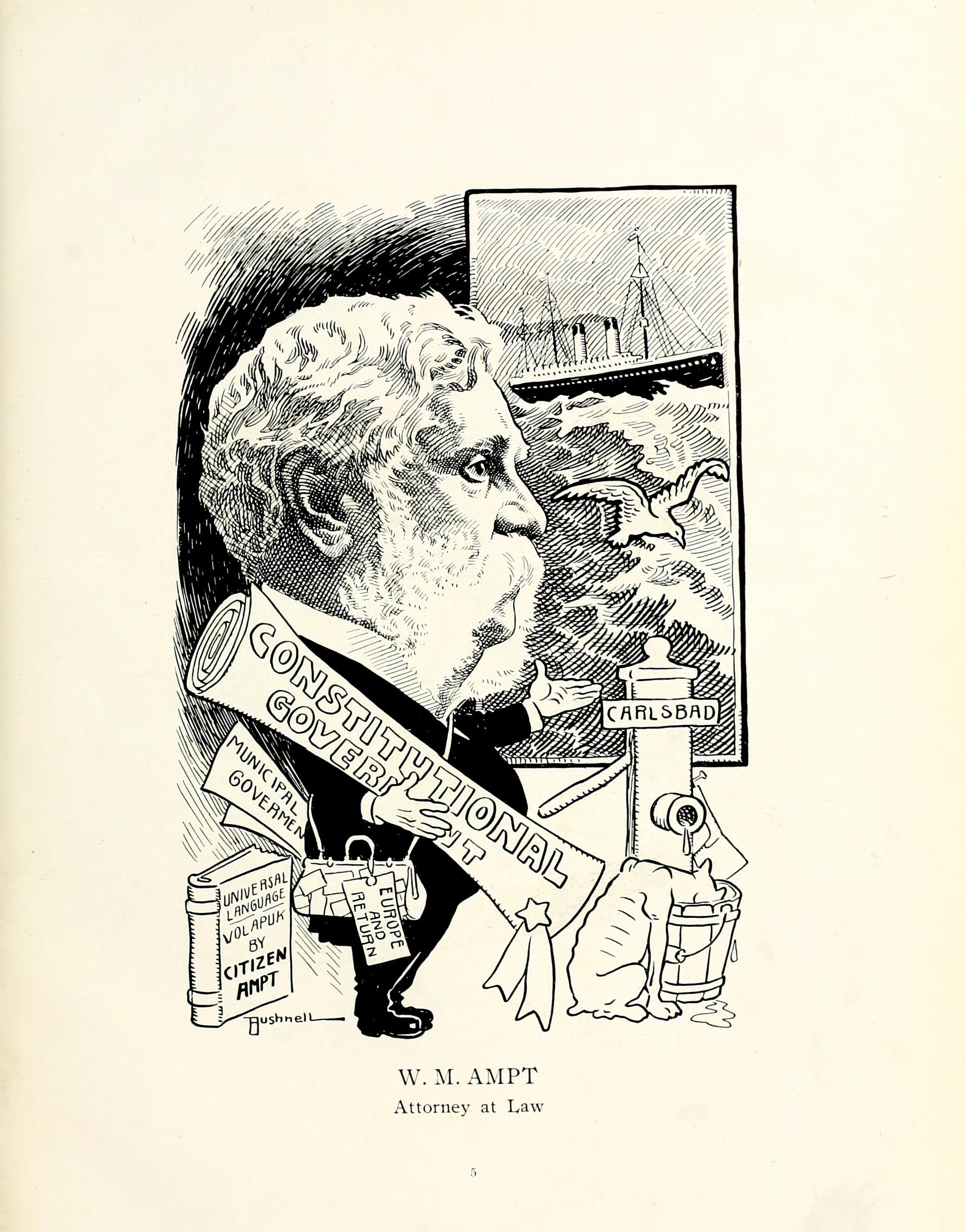
Caricature of Ampt, by E. A. Bushnell.

He died on December 16, 1909, in Cincinnati, Ohio.

Upon his death, it was revealed that Ampt had bequeathed nearly his entire estate (worth $150,000 in 1909 money) to the city of Cincinnati, to sponsor free public concerts; these concerts were still taking place as of 2012.
