= Reinhard Haupenthal =

Reinhard Haupenthal (born 17 February 1945; died 29 September 2016) was a German Esperantist, Volapükist (or Volapükologist), translator, and linguist. Donald J. Harlow described Haupenthal's personal style in a warning to potential readers of Haupenthal's translation of Goethe's Young Werther: "the vocabulary used by Haupenthal is far from standard, and at times the Esperanto verges on the incomprehensible."

== Literature ==
- Menade bal püki bal. Festschrift zum 50. Geburtstag von Reinhard Haupenthal. Festlibro por la 50a naskiĝ-tago de Reinhard Haupenthal. 1995-02-17. Antaŭparolo de Henri Vatré. Saarbrücken: Edition Iltis.
