= Neal Dow =

American Prohibition advocate and politician

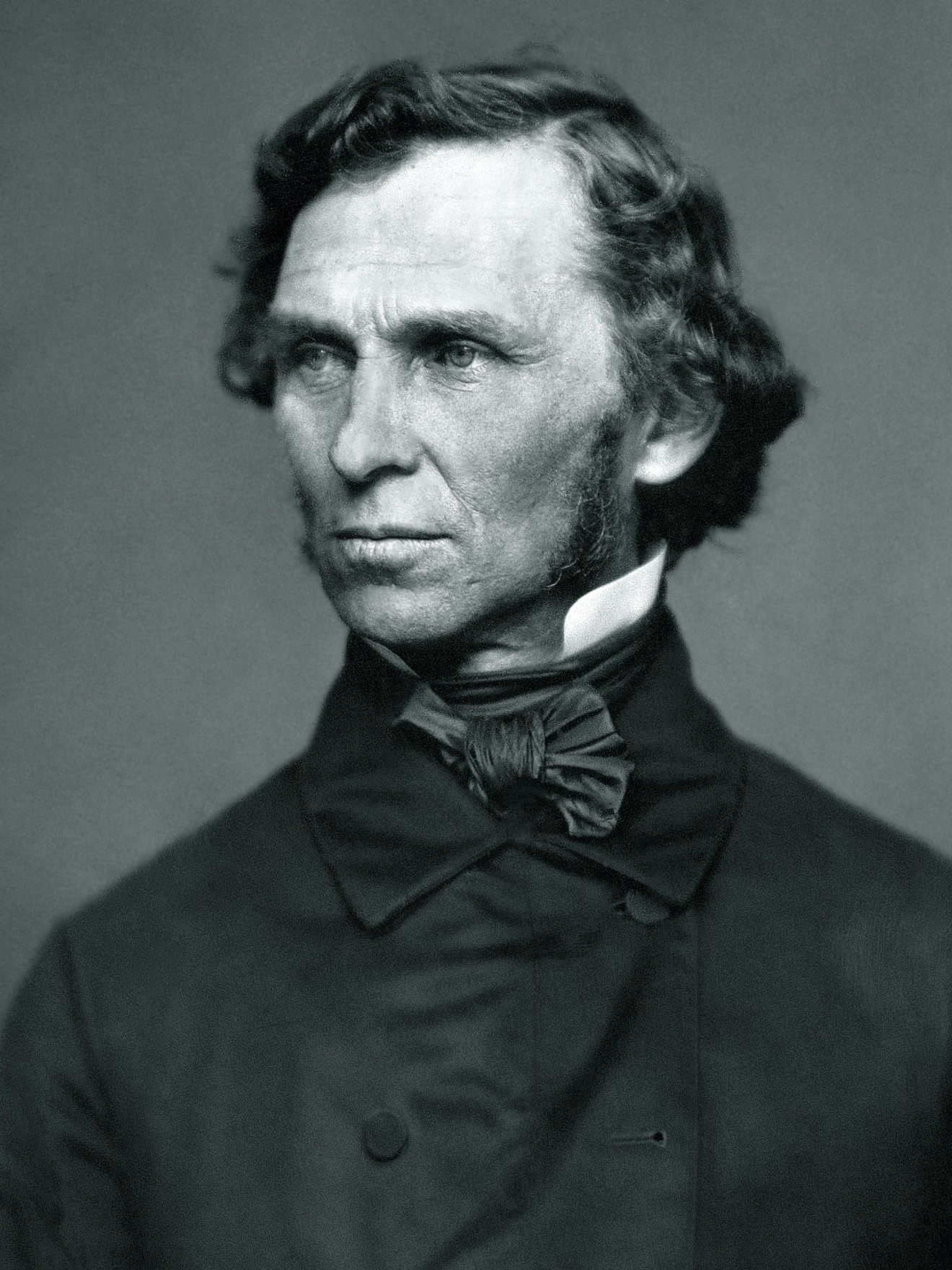

Mayor of Portland, Maine
- In office April 24, 1855 – April 24, 1856
- Preceded by: John B. Cahoon
- Succeeded by: J. T. McCobb
- In office April 24, 1851 – April 24, 1852
- Preceded by: John B. Cahoon
- Succeeded by: Albion Parris

Personal details
- Born: March 20, 1804 Portland, Maine, U.S.
- Died: October 2, 1897 (aged 93) Portland, Maine, U.S.
- Party: Whig, Free Soil, Republican, Prohibition
- Spouse: Maria Cornelia Durant Maynard Dow
- Profession: Politician
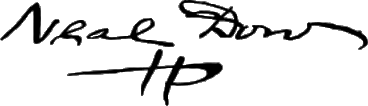
- Signature

Military service
- Allegiance: United States
- Branch/service: United States Army; Union Army
- Years of service: 1861–1864
- Rank: Brigadier general
- Commands: 1st Brigade, 2nd Division of the XIX Corps
- Battles/wars: American Civil War; Siege of Port Hudson

Neal Dow (March 20, 1804 – October 2, 1897) was an American Prohibition advocate and politician. Nicknamed the "Napoleon of Temperance" and the "Father of Prohibition", Dow was born to a Quaker family in Portland, Maine. From a young age, he believed alcohol to be the cause of many of society's problems and wanted to ban it through legislation. In 1850, Dow was elected president of the Maine Temperance Union, and the next year he was elected mayor of Portland. Soon after, largely due to Dow's efforts, the state legislature banned the sale and production of alcohol in what became known as the Maine law. Serving twice as mayor of Portland, Dow enforced the law with vigor and called for increasingly harsh penalties for violators. In 1855, his opponents rioted and he ordered the state militia to fire on the crowd. One man was killed and several wounded, and when public reaction to the violence turned against Dow, he chose not to seek reelection.

Dow was later elected to two terms in the Maine House of Representatives, but retired after a financial scandal. He joined the Union Army shortly after the outbreak of the American Civil War in 1861, eventually attaining the rank of brigadier general. He was wounded at the siege of Port Hudson and later captured. After being exchanged for another officer in 1864, Dow resigned from the military and devoted himself once more to prohibition. He spoke across the United States, Canada, and Great Britain in support of the cause. In 1880, Dow headed the Prohibition Party ticket for President of the United States. After losing the election, he continued to write and speak on behalf of the prohibition movement for the rest of his life until his death in Portland at the age of 93.

== Early life and family ==
Dow was born in Portland, Maine on March 20, 1804, the son of Josiah Dow and his wife, Dorcas Allen Dow. Josiah Dow was a member of the Society of Friends (commonly known as Quakers) and a farmer originally from New Hampshire. Dorcas Allen was also a Quaker, and a member of a prosperous Maine family headed by her prominent grandfather, Hatevil Hall. They had three children, of whom Neal was the middle child and only son. After his marriage, Dow's father opened a tannery in Portland, which soon became a successful business. After attending a Friends school in New Bedford, Massachusetts, and further schooling at Edward Payson's Portland Academy, Dow followed his father into the tanning trade in 1826. He embraced technology, becoming one of the first in the city to incorporate steam power in the tanning process.

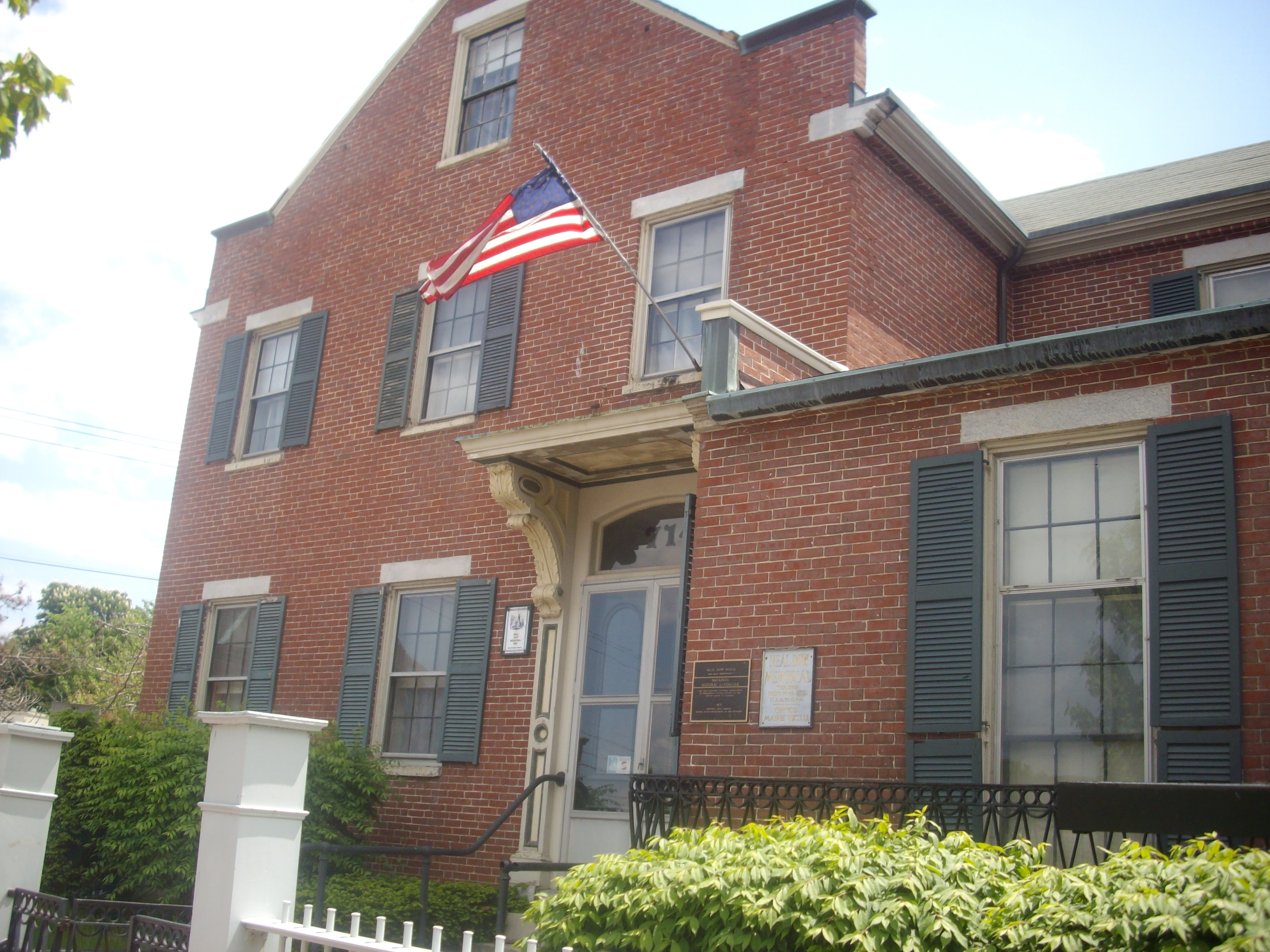
Neal Dow House in Portland

Dow struggled to conform to the tenets of his parents' Quaker faith; he was hot-tempered and enjoyed brawling from a young age. As he became wealthy later in life, he enjoyed wearing fine clothes, contrary to the Quakers' preference for plain dress. Some of his family's other virtues, such as thrift and abstinence from alcohol and tobacco, he adopted early in life. When he turned eighteen, Dow sought to avoid the required militia musters, more out of distaste for the drunkenness that they often involved than out of Quaker belief in pacifism. Instead, he joined the volunteer fire department, whose members were exempted from the muster. In 1827, Dow lobbied the Maine legislature to reform the fire companies to increase their efficiency. That same year, he argued against his fire company serving alcohol at its anniversary celebration; the members compromised, and served only wine, not hard liquor. At times Dow let his politics interfere with his duties; after being promoted to fire chief, he allowed a liquor store to burn to the ground.

The next year, Dow met his future wife, Maria Cornelia Maynard, the daughter of a Massachusetts merchant. They married on January 20, 1830. Over the next twenty years, they had nine children, five of whom (two sons and three daughters) survived infancy. Maria Cornelia was a Congregationalist, and Dow attended services with her at Second Parish Church regularly, although he never became a member. Their home, built at 714 Congress Street in Portland in 1829, was converted into a museum after Dow's death and is administered by the local chapter of the Women's Christian Temperance Union as the Neal Dow House.

== Temperance advocate ==
=== Early Prohibition efforts ===
In the 19th century, a typical American male consumed on average more than three times the alcohol of his modern-day counterpart. (Note: Historian W. J. Rorabaugh estimates that the average American consumed five gallons of spirits per year in the 1830s, the highest level before or since.) In his memoirs, Dow noted that in Portland a significant portion of a working man's pay was in the form of daily rum rations: "it was ... the rule to quit work at eleven in the forenoon and four in the afternoon to drink ... In every grocer's shop were casks [of] ... rum punch constantly prepared in a tub, sometimes on the sidewalk, just as lemonade is to be seen now on the Fourth of July." He saw alcohol as responsible for the downfall of individuals, families, and fortunes, often pointing out ramshackle homes or businesses to his family and saying "Rum did that." His quest to reform people by reforming their environment grew out of the religious movements of the Second Great Awakening and, as historian Judith N. McArthur later wrote, "temperance reformers urged their listeners to cast Demon Rum out of their lives just as evangelical ministers exhorted them to cast the Devil out of their hearts."

Many of Portland's middle- and upper-class citizens, including Dow, believed drunkenness was a great threat to the city's moral and financial well-being. In 1827, he became a founding member of the Maine Temperance Society. The group initially focused its efforts on the evils of distilled beverages, but by 1829, Dow declared he would abstain from all alcoholic beverages. At the same time, he associated himself with anti-Masonic and anti-slavery causes and became more involved with politics generally. In the 1832 presidential election, unsatisfied with both Andrew Jackson and Henry Clay, Dow backed William Wirt, a minor-party candidate.

In 1837, the Maine Temperance Society split over whether they should seek to ban wine as well as spirits; Dow sided with the anti-wine forces, who formed their own organization, the Maine Temperance Union. That year James Appleton, a Whig representative in the state legislature, proposed a prohibition law, and Dow spoke often and forcefully in favor of the effort, which was unsuccessful. Appleton proposed a similar law in 1838 and 1839, but despite his and Dow's best efforts, he continued to be defeated.

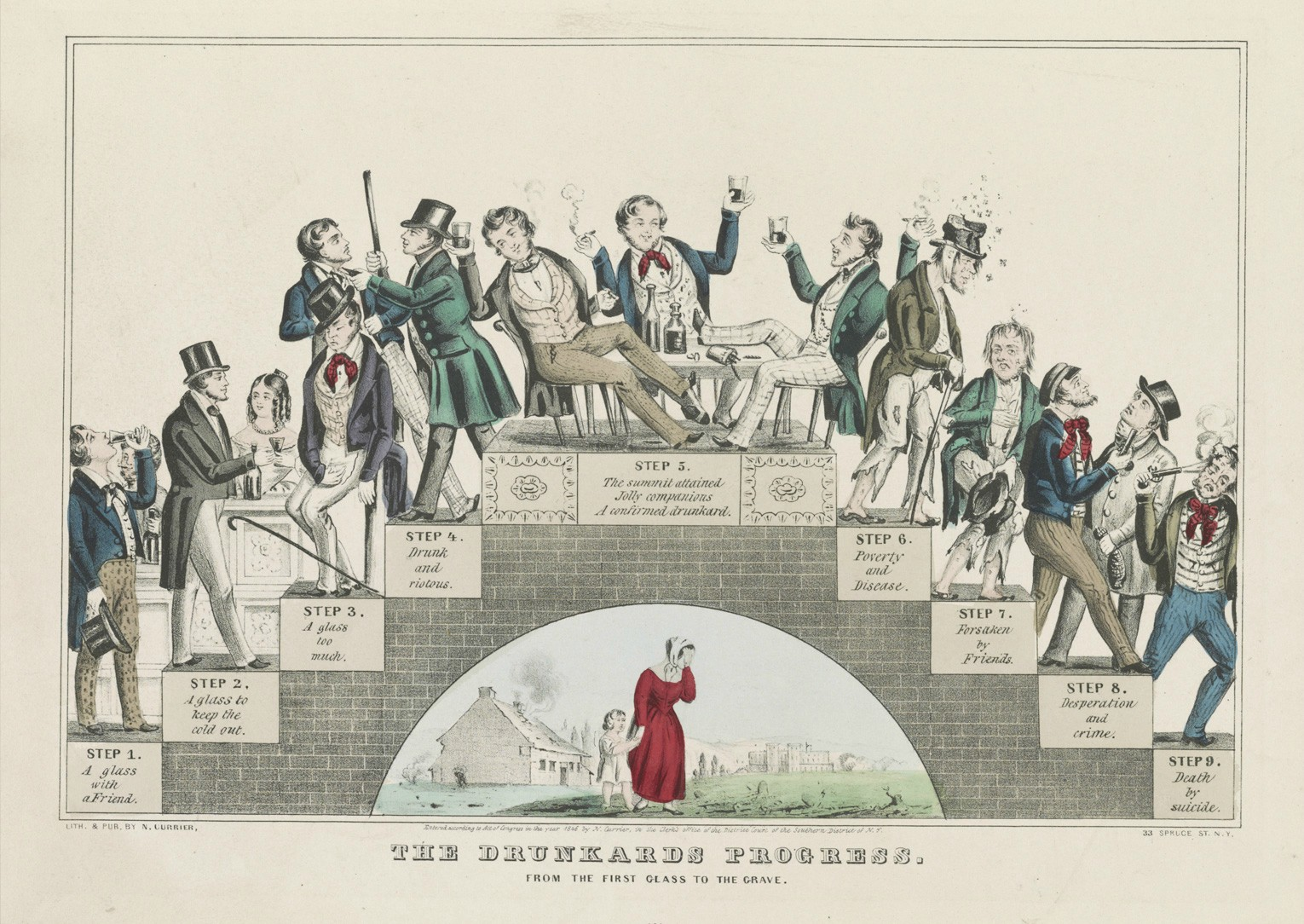
Dow and his fellow temperance advocates saw alcohol as the cause of many of society's ills.

Dow worked fervently on behalf of Whig candidates and came to detest Democrats as the tools of the alcohol industry. Maine's Whig governor, Edward Kent, granted Dow a colonel's commission in the state militia in 1841 as a reward for his efforts, despite his lack of military experience. Nevertheless, Dow did not consider himself "a party man in the politician's understanding of the term," and had no qualms about encouraging his supporters to vote against any Whig whom he considered insufficiently anti-alcohol.

Dow spent the early 1840s attending to his tanning business, but also found time to encourage individual drinkers to take up abstinence. In 1842, he and his allies succeeded in getting the city government in Portland to require licenses for liquor dealers and to prosecute unlicensed sellers; a referendum on the question was decided in the prohibitionists' favor later that year. The next year saw the Democrats win election to city government, replacing the more prohibition-friendly Whigs, and many liquor-sellers resumed their trade as prosecutions were deferred indefinitely. Dow kept up his speaking efforts around the state, despite once being assaulted by a man hired by a liquor dealer.

In 1846, Dow spoke before the legislature in favor of statewide prohibition. The bill passed but lacked the enforcement mechanisms necessary to give it effect. The following year, he ran for the state legislature in a special election but was narrowly defeated. In 1850, now a member of the new Free Soil Party, he encouraged like-minded legislators to pass a stronger prohibition law. They did so but saw it vetoed by Democratic governor John W. Dana. The legislature fell one vote short of overriding the veto.

=== Mayor of Portland ===
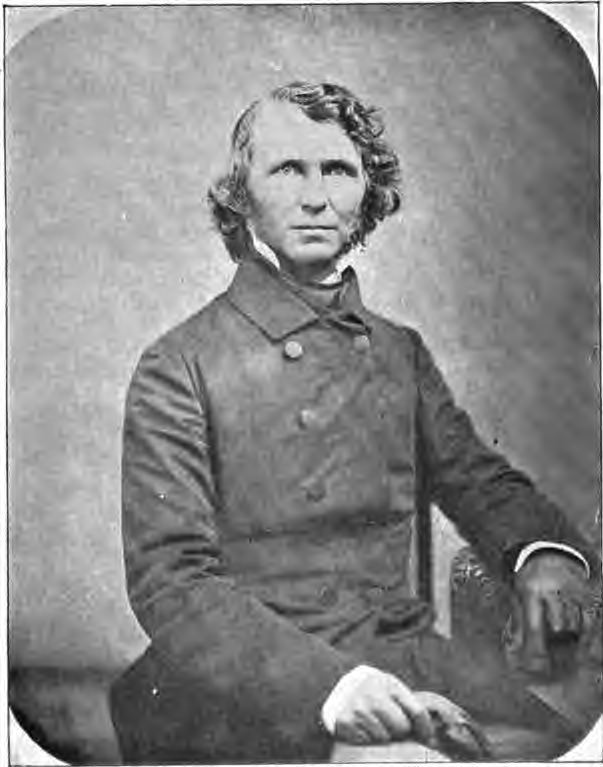
Dow in the early 1850s

In 1850, Dow was elected president of the Maine Temperance Union. The next year, he ran for mayor of Portland on the Whig ticket, and was elected by a vote of 1,332 to 986. Within a month of taking office, he lobbied the state legislature to pass a statewide prohibition law. It did so, and Dow met with the new governor, John Hubbard, who signed the bill into law on June 2. Maine was the first state to ban alcohol, and statewide prohibition became known around the country as "the Maine law". The law's passage propelled Dow to national fame. He was called the "Napoleon of Temperance", and was the featured speaker in August at a National Temperance Convention in New York City.

After the Maine law came into force, Dow allowed liquor dealers a two-week grace period to sell their stock out of state, then began confiscations. His enforcement efforts quickly drove respectable drinking establishments out of business, but less fancy saloons, especially those frequented by Portland's poor and immigrant residents, simply moved their operations to secret locations. Even so, Dow proclaimed in an address to the city council that he had eliminated all but a "few secret grog-shops", whose persistence he blamed on "foreigners".

Despite his growing national fame, Dow continued to face opposition at home. Both Dow and his opponents engaged in anonymous newspaper campaigns against the other, often making personal attacks alongside political arguments. For the 1852 municipal election, the Democrats nominated Albion Parris, a former governor and United States Senator, to run against Dow. While the Democrats rallied behind their candidate, Dow's vigorous enforcement of prohibition divided his party, and in two wards the Whigs ran an anti-Dow ticket instead. On election day, Dow slightly increased his vote total from the year before, with 1,496, but Parris outpolled him, bringing in 1,900 votes. Although the Whigs controlled voter registration at the time, Dow blamed his loss on illegal voting by Irish immigrants.

After his defeat, Dow continued to promote prohibition around the country, and was gratified to see it spread to eleven states. He also made efforts to refute the charge made by his enemies (including his cousin John Neal) that the Maine law was ineffective and that drinking had actually increased in Portland during Dow's term in office. In 1854, Dow ran for mayor again unsuccessfully; as the Whig Party began to break apart, Dow attracted support from the Free Soilers and the Know Nothings, a nativist party. By the next year, those two parties began to join anti-slavery Whigs in a new party, the Republicans. They soon controlled the state legislature and, with Dow's encouragement, strengthened the enforcement provisions of the Maine law. Dow ran again for mayor in 1855 and was narrowly re-elected to the office he had left three years earlier.

=== Portland Rum Riot ===
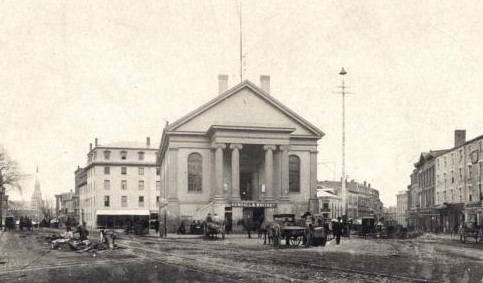
Portland's City Hall, site of the rum riot

Two months into his term, Dow inadvertently ran afoul of his own prohibition laws. After setting up a committee to dispense alcohol for medicinal and industrial use (the only uses permitted), Dow ordered $1,600 worth of alcohol and stored it at City Hall. Dow neglected to appoint an official agent to hold it there; because the invoice was in his name, this placed Dow in technical violation of the law. Dow's enemies seized on the mistake and demanded that the police search the municipal building for illegal liquor. Because the recent additions to the Maine law had removed judicial discretion, the judge had no choice but to issue the warrant. Police seized the alcohol, but did not arrest Dow.

That evening, June 2, a crowd of anti-prohibitionists gathered to demand that the law be enforced, shouting threats to spill "Neal Dow's liquor". Dow ordered the state militia to block the protesters and had the sheriff read the crowd the Riot Act. As darkness fell, Dow ordered the crowd to disperse; when they refused, he ordered the militia to fire. One man was killed and seven were wounded, and the crowd fled. On learning of the fatality, Dow maintained that the shooting was justified.

The violence turned public opinion against Dow, and he was denounced in newspapers across the nation. He was tried for violation of the prohibition law; the prosecutor was former U.S. attorney general Nathan Clifford, a longtime Dow opponent, and the defense attorney was a fellow founder of the Maine Temperance Society, future senator William P. Fessenden. Dow was acquitted, but his opponents convinced the coroner to impanel a jury that pronounced the protester's death a homicide. He was ultimately acquitted of that charge, but his popularity had suffered and he declined to run for re-election as mayor.

=== State legislator ===
Republicans lost the governorship that fall, and in 1856 the Democrats combined with the remaining Whigs in the state legislature to repeal the Maine law entirely. Some of the other states that had passed Maine laws followed suit as they learned that the promised benefits were not forthcoming and enforcement was difficult, if not impossible. Dow continued to travel the country (and the United Kingdom) speaking in support of prohibition, but to little legislative effect. Maine passed a new, much milder Maine law in 1858, which Dow disliked but defended as better than nothing.

In 1858, Dow won a special election to the Maine House of Representatives as a Republican when one of the members elected declined to serve. He won reelection to a full term in 1859, and continued to agitate for stricter prohibition laws, but was unsuccessful. He also became entangled in scandal when the State Treasurer, Benjamin D. Peck, lent out state funds to private citizens (including Dow) contravening state law. Peck lent large sums to himself, which were lost when his business ventures failed. Dow had guaranteed some of Peck's borrowing, and faced ruin as it became clear that Peck could not repay the state treasury. Dow was able to settle the debts and conceal much of his role in the affair, but enough of the scandal became known that some of his many enemies attacked him in local newspapers. Even some of his prohibitionist allies became less openly supportive of him. In September 1860, he did not run for re-election.

== Civil War ==
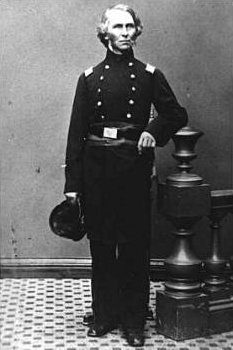
General Dow

Dow continued to promote prohibition after leaving office, but also added his voice to the growing chorus advocating the abolition of slavery. Several slaveholding states seceded after the election of Republican presidential candidate Abraham Lincoln, and formed the Confederate States of America; even before the outbreak of the Civil War, Dow called for the rebellion to be crushed and slavery abolished. He was 57 years old at the outbreak of the war, and determined to stay home and tend to his business and care for his aging father. After the Confederate attack on Fort Sumter, however, Dow felt compelled to join the Union cause. Governor Israel Washburn, Jr. appointed him Colonel of the 13th Maine Volunteer Infantry Regiment on November 23, 1861. Many of the officers Dow recruited to the cause were his associates from the prohibition movement.

=== New Orleans ===
After a winter of training in Maine, Dow and the 13th Maine were dispatched to the Gulf of Mexico in February 1862. Even before departing, Dow quarreled with his superiors when he learned his unit would be placed under the command of Major General Benjamin F. Butler, a Democrat whom Dow regarded as soft on slavery and "pro-rum". Dow's protests were ineffective, but they earned Butler's enmity. After joining Butler at Fort Monroe, Virginia, the regiment sailed south and was forced to land in North Carolina after a storm; Dow's performance in the emergency won Butler's praise, but the two still cordially loathed each other. After the damaged ships were repaired, Butler's army continued south to Ship Island, Mississippi.

Butler's army, aided by Flag Officer David Farragut's fleet, captured New Orleans on April 29, 1862. Dow and the 13th Maine did not join in the attack, remaining behind to guard Ship Island. A day earlier, Congress had approved Dow's promotion to brigadier general. He blamed Butler for excluding him from the battle, believing that Butler was threatened by his promotion and calling him a "bully and a beast". He spent much of the time quarreling with his second-in-command, Lieutenant Colonel Francis S. Hesseltine, while the regiment occupied forts around New Orleans. While there, Dow encouraged black slaves to run away from captivity and take shelter with the Union Army. He also confiscated property from nearby planters, including those who supported the Union, and tried unsuccessfully to claim personal salvage rights over Confederate military property abandoned in the river.

In October 1862, Dow was given command over the District of Pensacola, and moved to join other units there. He immediately earned the troops' disfavor by placing Pensacola under prohibition. He also (without authorization from Washington) began to recruit black troops from the local slave population while continuing his confiscation of rebel property. Butler soon countermanded the confiscation order, which Dow believed was done in revenge for his banning of alcohol.

=== Port Hudson and capture ===
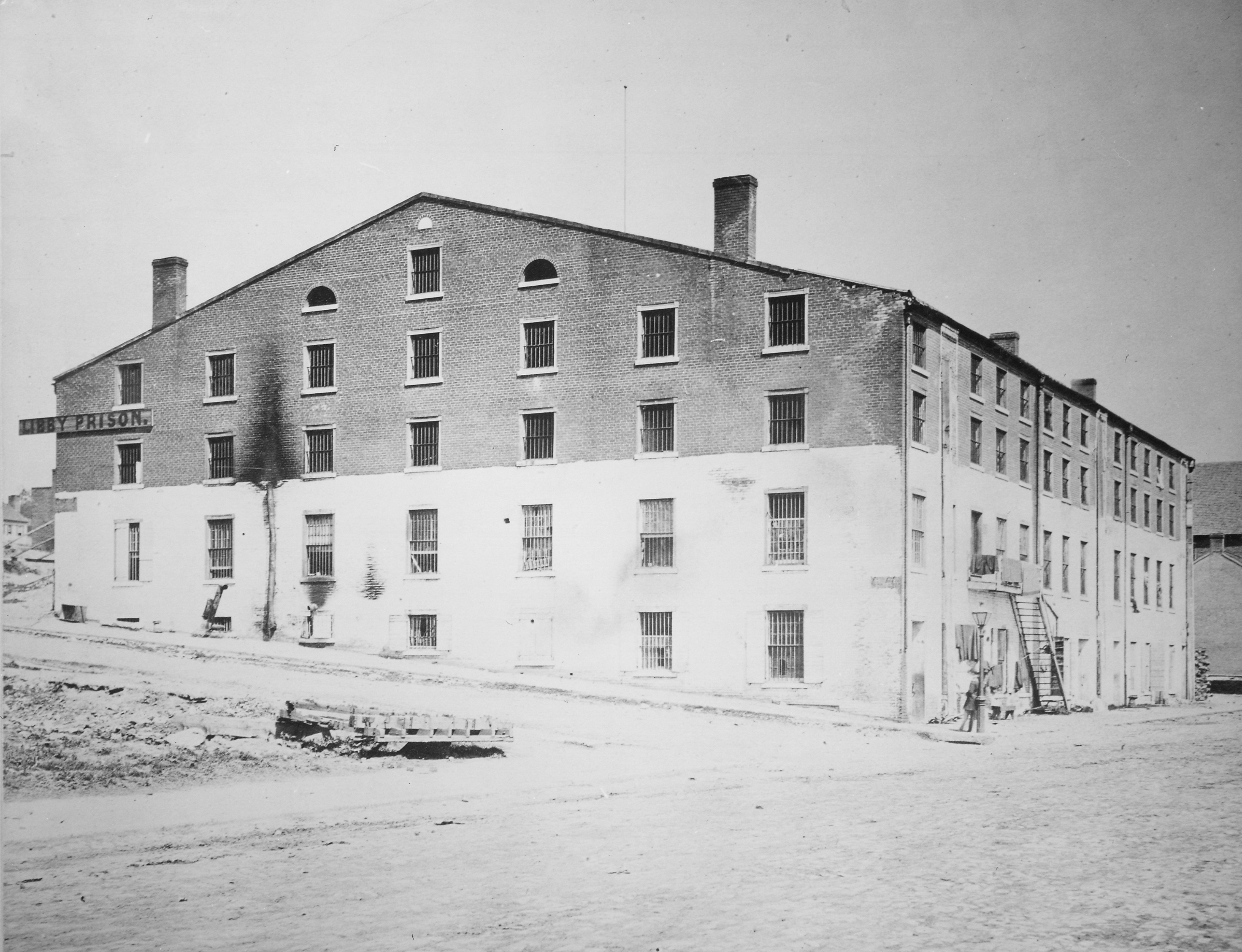
Libby Prison, the site of Dow's imprisonment

In December 1862, Nathaniel P. Banks replaced Butler in command at New Orleans. Banks, a Massachusetts Republican with prohibitionist sympathies, had known Dow before the war, but he initially displeased Dow by refusing to repeal Butler's order against confiscation of rebel property. He did, however, allow Dow to return to New Orleans to take part in the planned spring offensive. As the Union armies looked to complete their control over the Mississippi River, only Vicksburg, Mississippi and Port Hudson, Louisiana held out against federal control. Major General Ulysses S. Grant moved on Vicksburg from the north while Banks advanced to Port Hudson from the south. By May 21, the town was surrounded.

Banks was determined to break the siege by a direct assault on the Confederate lines. Dow believed the attack to be a mistake, and delayed his units' participation until later in the day. In the assault, which was unsuccessful, Dow was wounded in the right arm and left thigh and sent to a nearby plantation to convalesce. While in the hospital, he lobbied for a transfer to a theater where his chances of promotion would be greater. On June 30, having healed enough to mount a horse again, Dow visited his troops. As he returned to the hospital after dark, he was captured by Confederate cavalry operating behind Union lines.

Dow was taken by wagon and train to Jackson, Mississippi, then to Montgomery, Alabama, before finally being confined to Libby Prison in Richmond, Virginia, the Confederacy's capital. In August, he was transferred to Mobile, Alabama, where Confederate officials investigated whether Dow had armed slaves to fight against the rebels, which the Confederate Congress had made a capital offense. Dow had done so, but his prosecutors could find no evidence of such an action after the law was passed, so the charges were dropped and Dow was returned to Libby Prison in October. He remained there until February 1864, when he was exchanged for captive Confederate General William Henry Fitzhugh Lee, son of General Robert E. Lee. His health was damaged by his prison experience, and after spending several months convalescing in Portland, he resigned from the Army in November 1864.

== Postwar politics ==
After the war, Dow returned to his leadership of the prohibition movement, co-founding the National Temperance Society and Publishing House with James Black in 1865. He spent the rest of the 1860s and 1870s giving speeches in support of temperance across the United States, Canada, and Great Britain. His efforts produced little success, as the public turned against prohibition and the alcohol industry was better organized to resist. Dow expended a great deal of effort organizing and giving speeches in support of the Liberal Party before the British elections of 1874, as their leader, William Ewart Gladstone, was sympathetic to prohibition; the Liberals lost decisively, a result Gladstone and Dow blamed on liquor interests. Dow continued to promote prohibition in Britain until May 1875 when, exhausted, he returned home.

Against calls for personal temperance instead of government restraint, Dow remained steadfast, saying that the only way to fight drunkenness was "more jail for the rascals." In 1876, he supported the election of Rutherford B. Hayes, a Republican and teetotaler. The following year, Dow saw some success for prohibition as Maine's legislature strengthened the weak prohibition law there by banning distilling in the state. Despite that minor victory, Dow began to sour on the Republican party, believing them insufficiently committed to his cause and disappointed at their failure to protect the rights of Southern blacks as Reconstruction came to an end. Other temperance advocates felt the same way, and some had organized a new Prohibition Party in 1869. The Prohibitionists focused their efforts on banning alcohol to the exclusion of all other issues. Most party members came from pietist churches, and most, like Dow, were former Republicans. They had won very few votes in the 1872 and 1876 presidential elections, but as temperance advocates grew disenchanted with the Republican Party, they hoped to win converts in 1880.

=== Presidential election of 1880 ===
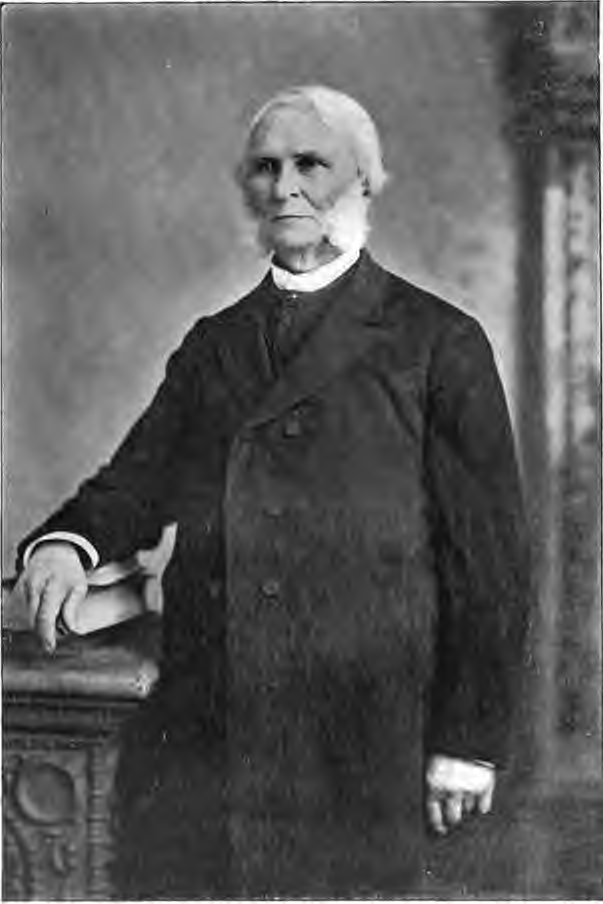
Dow at age 87

In 1880, Maine Republicans refused to pass more anti-alcohol legislation, and Dow quit the party to join the Prohibitionists; he instantly became the party's most prominent member. His friend and ally James Black requested that Dow's name be placed in nomination for the presidency at the 1880 convention, to which Dow agreed. The convention that met in Cleveland that June welcomed delegates from twelve states, but attracted almost no attention from the press. Dow himself did not attend, staying home with his ailing wife (candidates for a party's nomination often did not attend conventions in person at that time). He was nominated, heading a ticket with vice-presidential nominee Henry Adams Thompson of Ohio.

Dow mostly ignored the national contest that summer, focusing on campaigning for pro-temperance candidates in local Maine elections. Republicans, especially James G. Blaine, pressured Dow to withdraw, fearing that he would claim enough votes to cost their nominee, James A. Garfield, the election. Dow declined to do so, but his vote totals were too small to harm Garfield in any case. The Prohibition ticket polled just 10,305 votes, 0.1% of the total. Garfield narrowly won the popular vote over Democrat Winfield Scott Hancock, but in the electoral college, he carried a clear majority. Dow was not displeased with the result, happy that the Republicans had triumphed over the "ex-slavedriving rebel element".

=== Later years ===
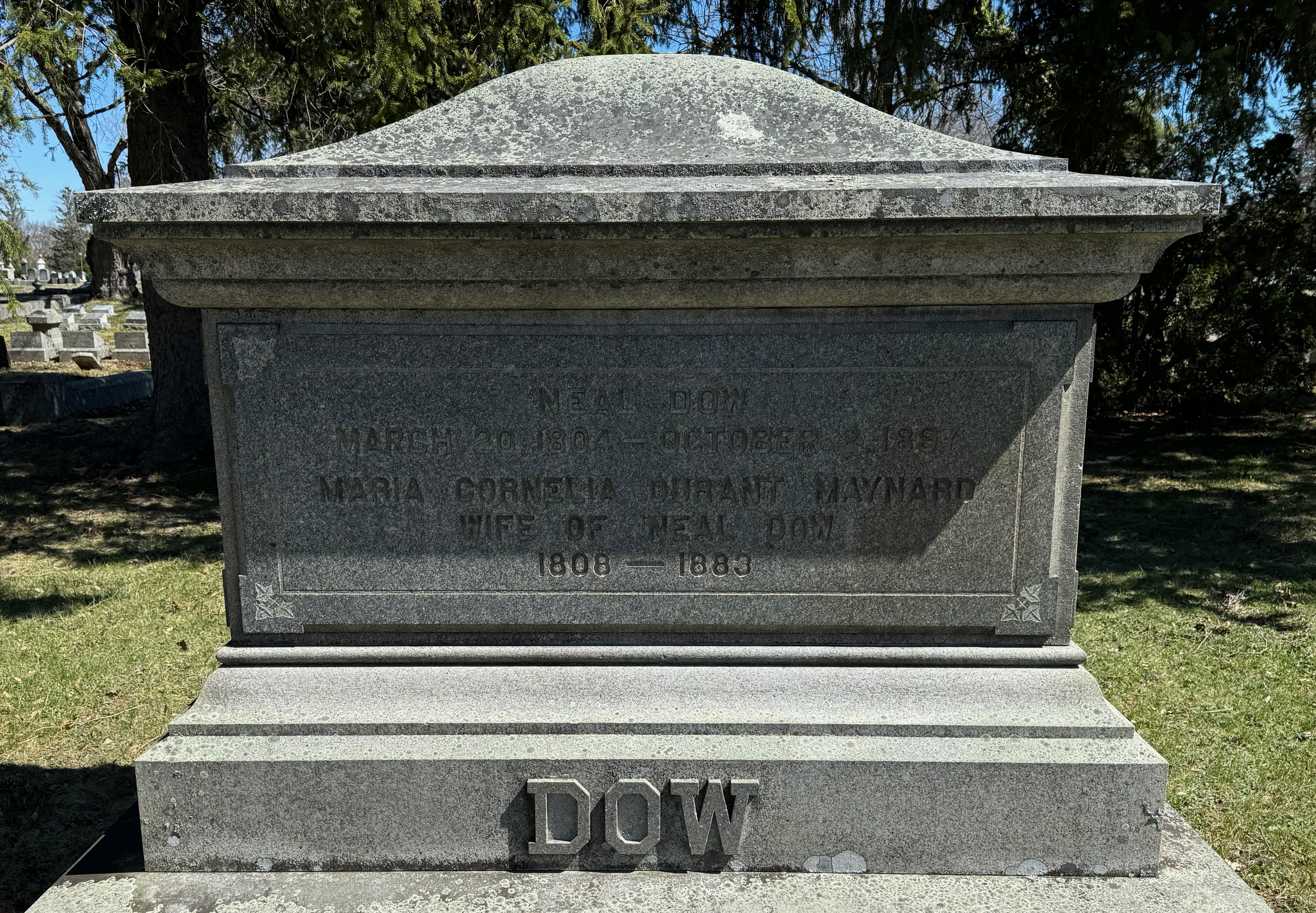
Dow's grave marker at Evergreen Cemetery

After the election, Dow began to work with Republicans again in Maine to advance prohibition issues, and in 1884 he endorsed fellow Mainer and Republican candidate for president James G. Blaine. Blaine narrowly lost the election, the first Republican loss in 28 years, and many Republicans blamed the Prohibition Party, whose votes would have tipped New York (and with it the electoral college majority) to Blaine. Resentful Republicans in Maine refused to advance any more prohibition laws, and as a result Dow made his final break with the Republican Party in 1885. In the 1886 state election, he spoke fervently against his former party and in support of the Prohibitionist candidate for governor. In 1888, at the age of 84, Dow accepted the Prohibition Party nomination for mayor of Portland, an office he had held more than thirty years earlier. The Democrats were unable to decide on a candidate, so they endorsed their former enemy, Dow, in an effort to unseat the Republican incumbent. Many regular Democrats refused to support the fusion ticket, and Dow lost the election by 1,934 votes to 3,504. Later that year, Dow attended the 1888 Prohibition Party National Convention in Indianapolis. In a break from his erstwhile contempt for the former Confederacy, Dow called for sectional unity and "no more waving of the bloody shirt". He also spoke against the political expediency of the party backing women's suffrage, although he personally endorsed the idea.

Cornelia Dow had died in 1883, but Dow's unmarried daughter, also named Cornelia, lived with him and assisted in temperance causes. In 1891, his son Fred and his family moved in as well. Fred remained active in his father's former Republican Party and was the editor of the Portland Evening Express. Despite a fall from a horse in 1890, Dow continued in good health, reading and writing about his signature issue, but travelling less. On his ninetieth birthday in 1894, a large crowd gathered to celebrate him and his life's work. In 1895, he gave his final public speech, criticizing the city government for not enforcing the prohibition laws. He began to write his memoirs, The Reminiscences of Neal Dow: Recollections of Eighty Years, but died on October 2, 1897, before completing the book. Dow's body lay in state at the Second Parish Church in Portland before being buried in that city's Evergreen Cemetery. He had seen the rise of the prohibition movement and, as biographer Frank L. Byrne notes, proselytized the cause "more than any man of the 19th century".

== Sources ==
Books

- Byrne, Frank L. (1961). Prophet of Prohibition: Neal Dow and His Crusade. Madison, Wisconsin: State Historical Society of Wisconsin. OCLC 2126034.
- Clancy, Herbert J. (1958). The Presidential Election of 1880. Chicago, Illinois: Loyola University Press. ISBN 978-1-258-19190-0.
- Dow, Neal (1898). The Reminiscences of Neal Dow: Recollections of Eighty Years. Portland, Maine: The Evening Express Publishing Company. OCLC 60713405.
- Kleppner, Paul (1979). The Third Electoral System, 1853–1892: Parties, Voters, and Political Cultures. Chapel Hill, North Carolina: University of North Carolina Press. ISBN 0-8078-1328-1.
- Kobler, John (1993) [1973]. Ardent Spirits: The Rise and Fall of Prohibition. New York, New York: Da Capo Press. ISBN 0-306-80512-X.
- Lufkin, Edwin B. (1898). History of the Thirteenth Maine Regiment. Bridgton, Maine: H.A. Shorery and Sons. OCLC 5652295.
- McPherson, James M. (1988). Battle Cry of Freedom: The Civil War Era. New York, New York: Ballantine Books. ISBN 0-345-35942-9.
- Okrent, Daniel (2010). Last Call: The Rise and Fall of Prohibition. New York, New York: Scribner. ISBN 978-0-7432-7702-0.
- Rorabaugh, W.J. (1979). The Alcoholic Republic: An American Tradition. New York, New York: Oxford University Press. ISBN 0-19-502584-9.

Articles

- Babcock, Robert H. (March 1990). "The Decline of Artisan Republicanism in Portland, Maine, 1825–1850". The New England Quarterly. 63 (1): 3–34. doi:10.2307/366058. JSTOR 366058.
- McArthur, Judith N. (Winter 1989). "Demon Rum on the Boards: Temperance Melodrama and the Tradition of Antebellum Reform". Journal of the Early Republic. 9 (4): 517–540. doi:10.2307/3123754. JSTOR 3123754.
- Miner, Alonzo Ames (June 1894). "Neal Dow and his Life Work". The New England Magazine. 10 (4): 397–412. OCLC 1644447.

Thesis

- Philipp, Ernest Joseph (1917). "Chapter 6: Minor Party Conventions". The Presidential Election of 1880 (M.A. thesis). University of Wisconsin.

Website

- "Neal Dow House Endowment". Neal Dow House. Archived from the original on January 5, 2016.

Political offices
Preceded by John B. Cahoon	Mayor of Portland, Maine; 1851–1852	Succeeded by Albion K. Parris
Preceded by John B. Cahoon	Mayor of Portland, Maine; 1855–1856	Succeeded by James T. McCobb
Party political offices
Preceded by Green Clay Smith	Prohibition Party presidential nominee 1880 (lost)	Succeeded by John St. John
