= Alice Vanderbilt Morris =

Vanderbilt family member

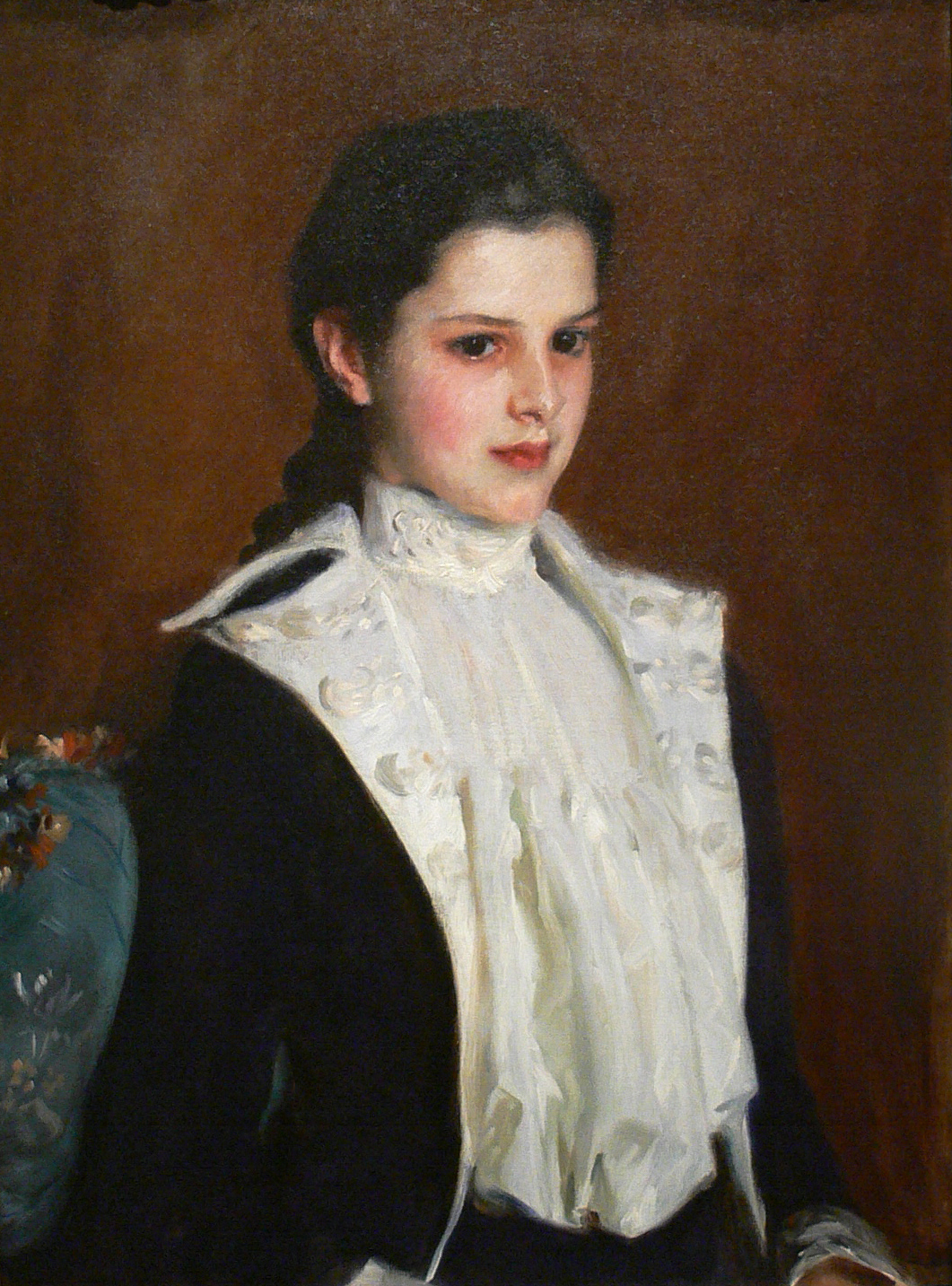
- Portrait of 13 year old Alice by John Singer Sargent, 1888
- Born: Alice Vanderbilt Shepard; December 7, 1874; New York City, New York, U.S.
- Died: August 15, 1950 (aged 75); Bar Harbor, Maine, U.S.
- Education: Radcliffe College
- Known for: Co-founder of IALA
- Spouse: Dave Hennen Morris (m. 1895; died 1944)
- Children: Dave Hennen Jr., Louise, Lawrence, Noel, Emily, Alice
- Parent(s): Elliot Fitch Shepard; Margaret Louisa Vanderbilt
- Relatives: See Vanderbilt family

Alice Vanderbilt Shepard Morris (December 7, 1874 – August 15, 1950) was a member of the Vanderbilt family. She co-founded the International Auxiliary Language Association (IALA).

== Early life ==
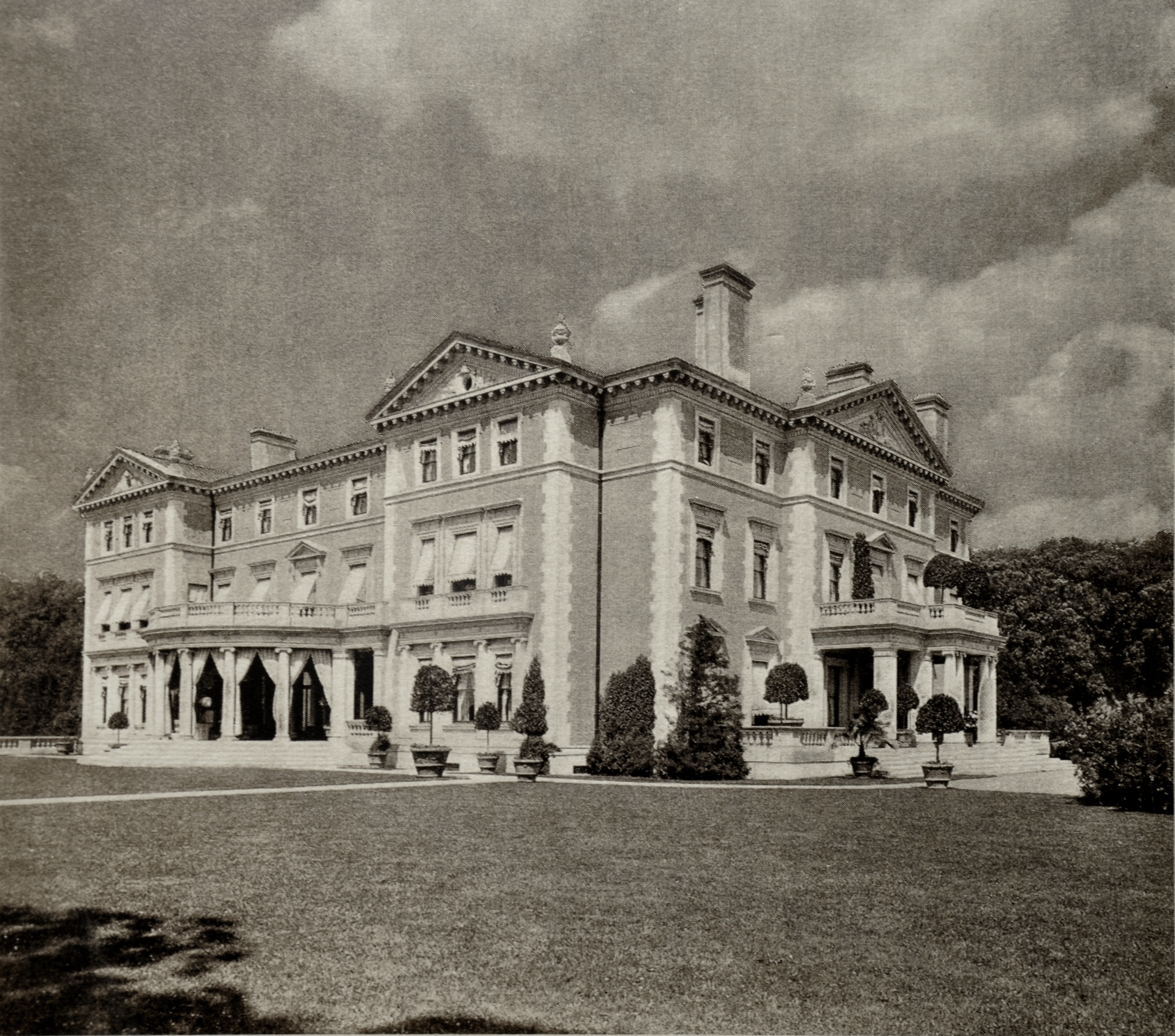
Woodlea, her parents home in Westchester County, New York in 1895

Alice was born on December 7, 1874, in New York. She was one of five daughters born to the former Margaret Louisa Vanderbilt (1845–1924) and, her husband, Elliot Fitch Shepard (1833–1893). Her mother was the eldest daughter of William Henry Vanderbilt and Maria Louisa (née Kissam) Vanderbilt. Her father was a lawyer, banker, and owner of the Mail and Express newspaper, as well as a founder and president of the New York State Bar Association.

Morris grew up in Woodlea, a mansion on the Hudson now occupied as the clubhouse of the Sleepy Hollow Country Club. Among her siblings was sister Edith Shepard and brother Elliot Fitch Shepard Jr. Alice was known to her family as "Angela" because of the sweetness of her disposition and beauty. She climbed a tree against her father's specific interdiction and fell out fracturing her thoracic spine. Her father refused to call the doctor to punish her disobedience. The injury resulted in her becoming disabled.

== Education and work ==
She attended the Radcliffe College of Harvard University. She was an honorary member of the Phi Beta Kappa society. She also received an honorary doctorate in Literary Science from Syracuse University "as special recognition of the field of study that you have made your own, the field of the international auxiliary language." She was Vice President of the World Service Council of the YWCA United States.

From her youth, Morris was troubled by ill health and was forced to spend much of her time on a sofa. Despite her illness, she initiated what was probably the most extensive linguistic research undertaken to date. During her stay at a clinic, Morris found a brochure on the artificial language Esperanto. She became interested in the idea of a neutral auxiliary language that could facilitate communication among diverse groups of people. Frederick Gardner Cottrell, later a well-known American chemist, persuaded Morris to tackle the problem of an auxiliary language, but objectively and scientifically.

In 1924, Morris and her husband founded the International Auxiliary Language Association (IALA). Morris had studied Esperanto, so the neutrality of IALA was often a dilemma for her. Nevertheless, she succeeded in remaining neutral. In 1945, she co-authored with Mary C. Bray the General Report of IALA. Morris was actively involved in the association – and remained its honorary Secretary – for the rest of her life.

== Personal life ==
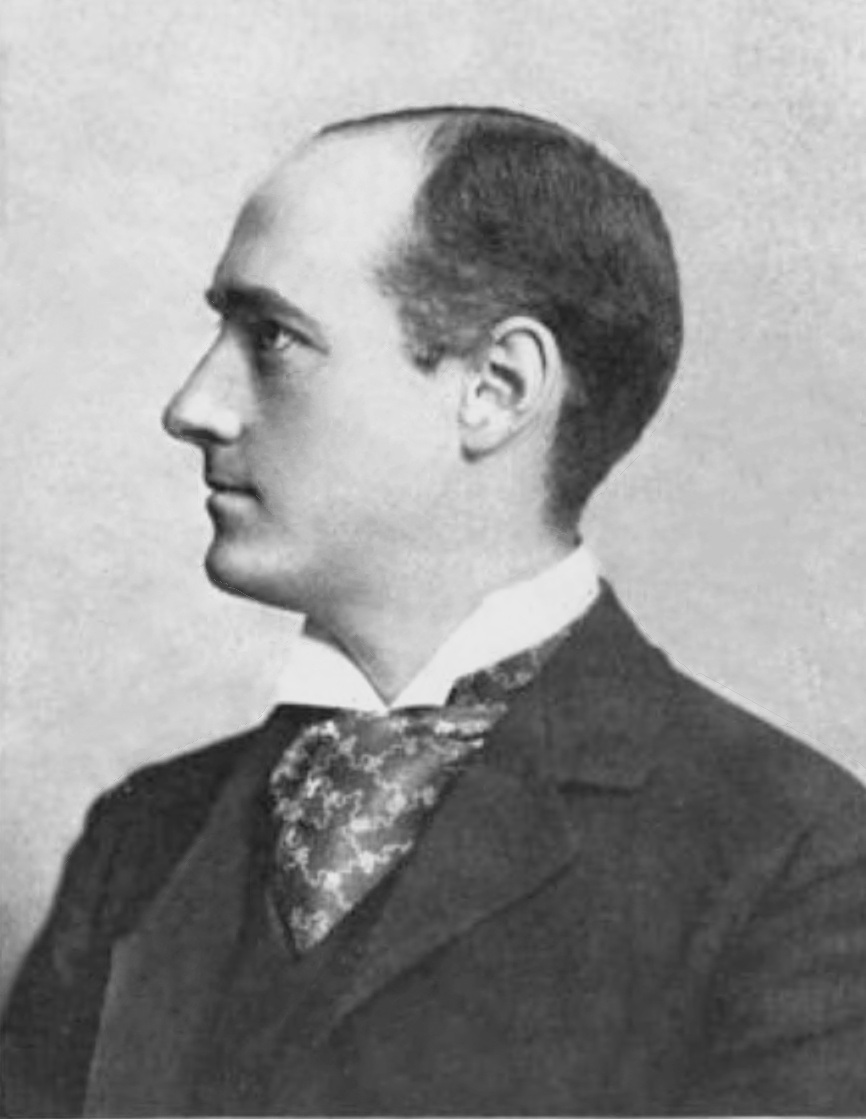
Photograph of her husband, David Hennen Morris, in 1902

She was courted for some time by Dave Hennen Morris (1872–1944) who saw her face around the funnel of the steamer to France and decided that he must marry her. When he pursued her more closely, he saw that she had scoliosis, but this did not change his mind. When he presented himself to her father to ask for her hand in marriage, he was told he would never amount to anything good. He was also asked to leave and have no further contact with the family. When he was allowed to say good-bye to her in the hall, he asked her to elope with him. She climbed out the window that night to do so. Her sister later packed up her clothes in a trunk and sent them on by Railway Express. Mr. Shepard was infuriated at the insubordination of yet another daughter and refused to speak to her for a year, as the family story goes. Morris later became the U.S. Ambassador to Belgium from 1933 until 1937.

Dave was the son of John Albert Morris, a wealthy horseman, and Cora Hennen Morris, daughter of prominent New Orleans Judge Alfred Hennen. The couple, who married in 1895, had six children:

- Dave Hennen Morris Jr. (1900–1975), who married Alice Agnew in 1926. They divorced and he married Mary Josephine Dority (1907–1979).
- Louise Morris (1901–1976), who married Dudley Holbrook Mills (1894–1987) in 1922.
- Lawrence Morris (1903–1967), who married Ruth Spafford Whittmeyer, daughter of Joseph H. Spafford, in 1953.
- Noel Morris (1904–1928), who committed suicide at the age of twenty-four in 1928.
- Emily Hammond Morris (1907–1995), who married Hamilton Hadley (1896–1975), son of Arthur T. Hadley, President of Yale University, in 1929.
- Alice Vanderbilt Morris (1911–1986), who married Walter Knight Sturges, Jr. (1909–1992), an architect, in 1939.

Morris died in Bar Harbor, Maine in August 1950 at the age of 75. About six months later, the Interlingua-English Dictionary was published, presenting to the world her life's work, Interlingua.

== In popular culture ==
In 1999, Julia S. Falk of Michigan State University published the book Women, Language and Linguistics – Three American Stories from the First Half of the Twentieth Century (320 pp.). The women portrayed were Gladys Amanda Reichard, E. Adelaide Hahn, and Alice Vanderbilt Morris.

== See also ==
- Interlingua
- International Auxiliary Language Association
