= Margaret Louisa Vanderbilt Shepard =

American heiress (1845–1924)

Margaret Vanderbilt Shepard
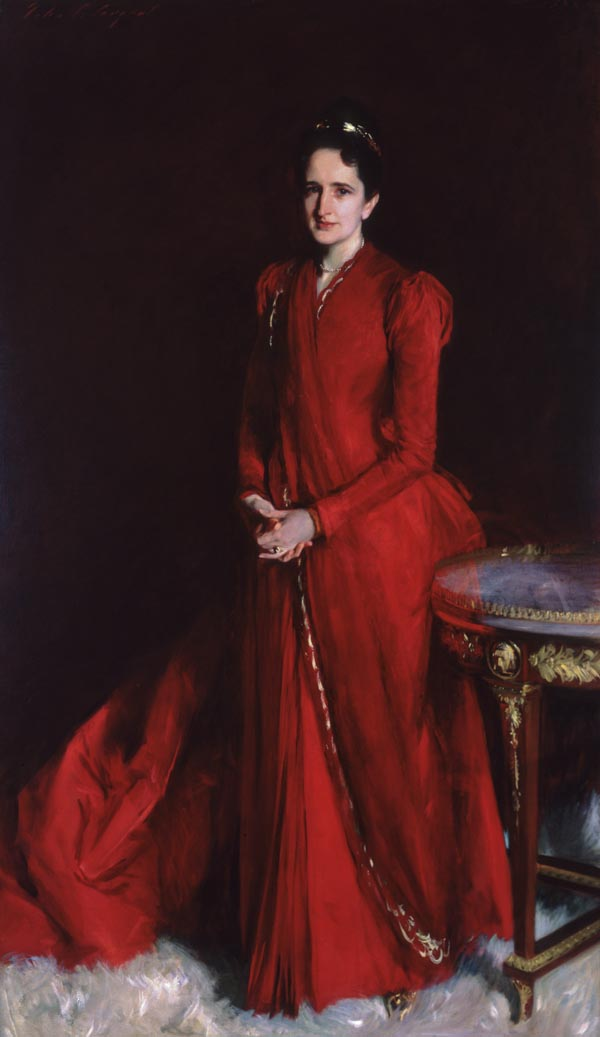
- Portrait of Margaret by John Singer Sargent, 1888
- Born: July 23, 1845; New Dorp, New York, U.S.
- Died: March 3, 1924 (aged 78); New York City, New York, U.S.
- Spouse: Elliott Fitch Shepard (m. 1868; died 1893)
- Children: 6, including Edith, Alice, Elliott
- Parent(s): William Henry Vanderbilt; Maria Louisa Kissam
- Relatives: See Vanderbilt family

Margaret Louisa Vanderbilt Shepard (New Dorp, New York (state) July 23, 1845 – Manhattan, March 3, 1924) was an American heiress and a member of the prominent Vanderbilt family. As a philanthropist, she funded the YMCA, helping create a hotel for guests of the organization. She was married to prominent New York City lawyer, banker, and newspaper editor Elliott Fitch Shepard.

== Early life ==
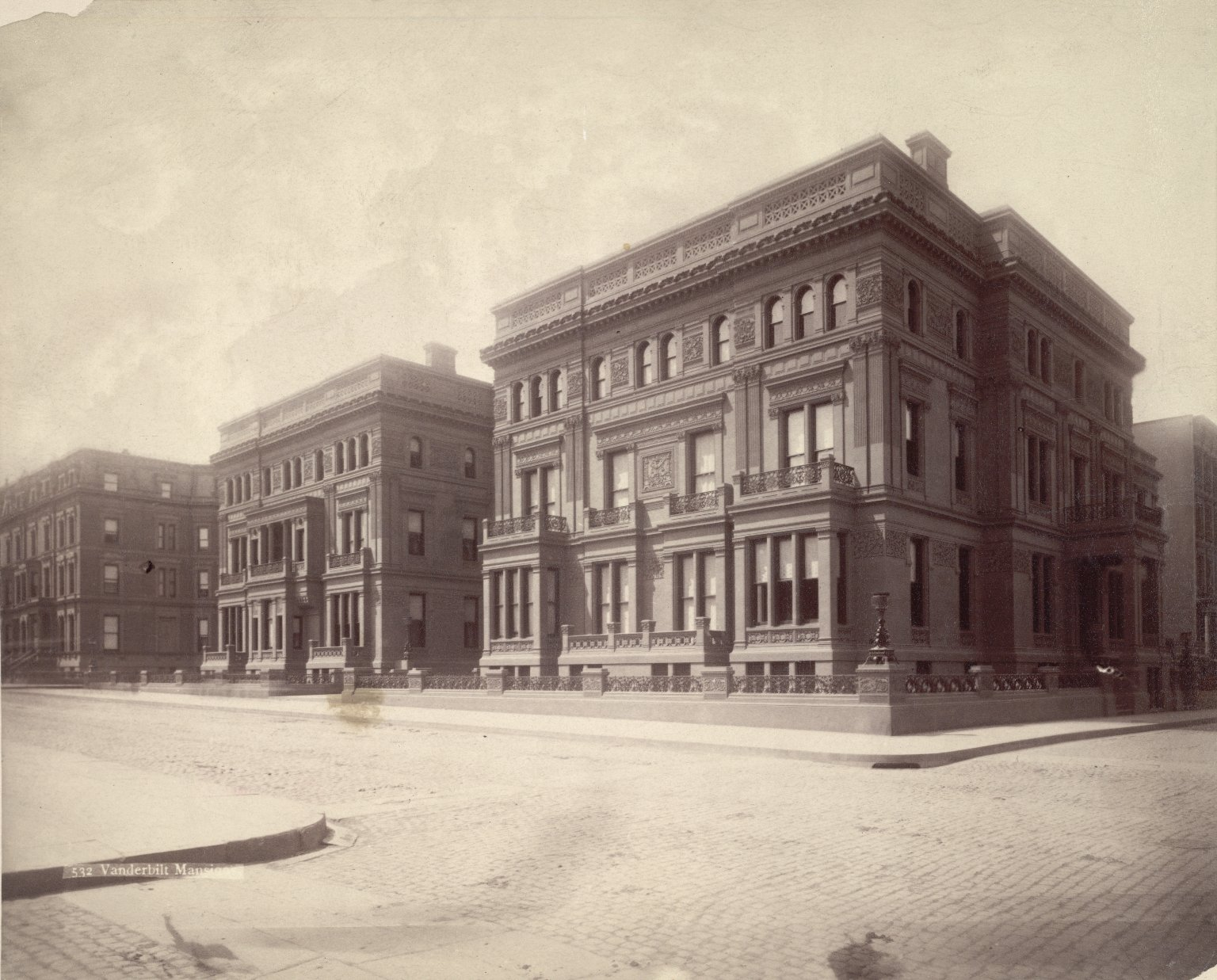
The Shepards' New York City townhouse (right), part of the Vanderbilt Triple Palace

Margaret was born on July 23, 1845, in Staten Island, New York. She was the eldest daughter of William Henry Vanderbilt and Maria Louisa Kissam Vanderbilt. Her older brother was Cornelius Vanderbilt II and younger siblings William Kissam Vanderbilt, Emily Thorn Vanderbilt, Florence Adele Vanderbilt Twombly, Frederick William Vanderbilt, Eliza Osgood Vanderbilt Webb and George Washington Vanderbilt II.

She was the granddaughter of the Commodore Cornelius Vanderbilt and his first wife, Sophia (née Johnson) Vanderbilt.

== Charity work ==
An ardent supporter of the YWCA, she built, in 1891, the Margaret Louisa, a YWCA hotel strictly for transient guests at 14 E. 16th Street in New York City. Mrs. Shepard fully financed and furnished the building which was named the "Margaret Louisa Home for Protestant Women".

Margaret Louisa narrowly escaped being a victim of the RMS Titanic, having booked passage but for unknown reasons cancelled and traveled a week earlier on the RMS Olympic.

== Personal life ==
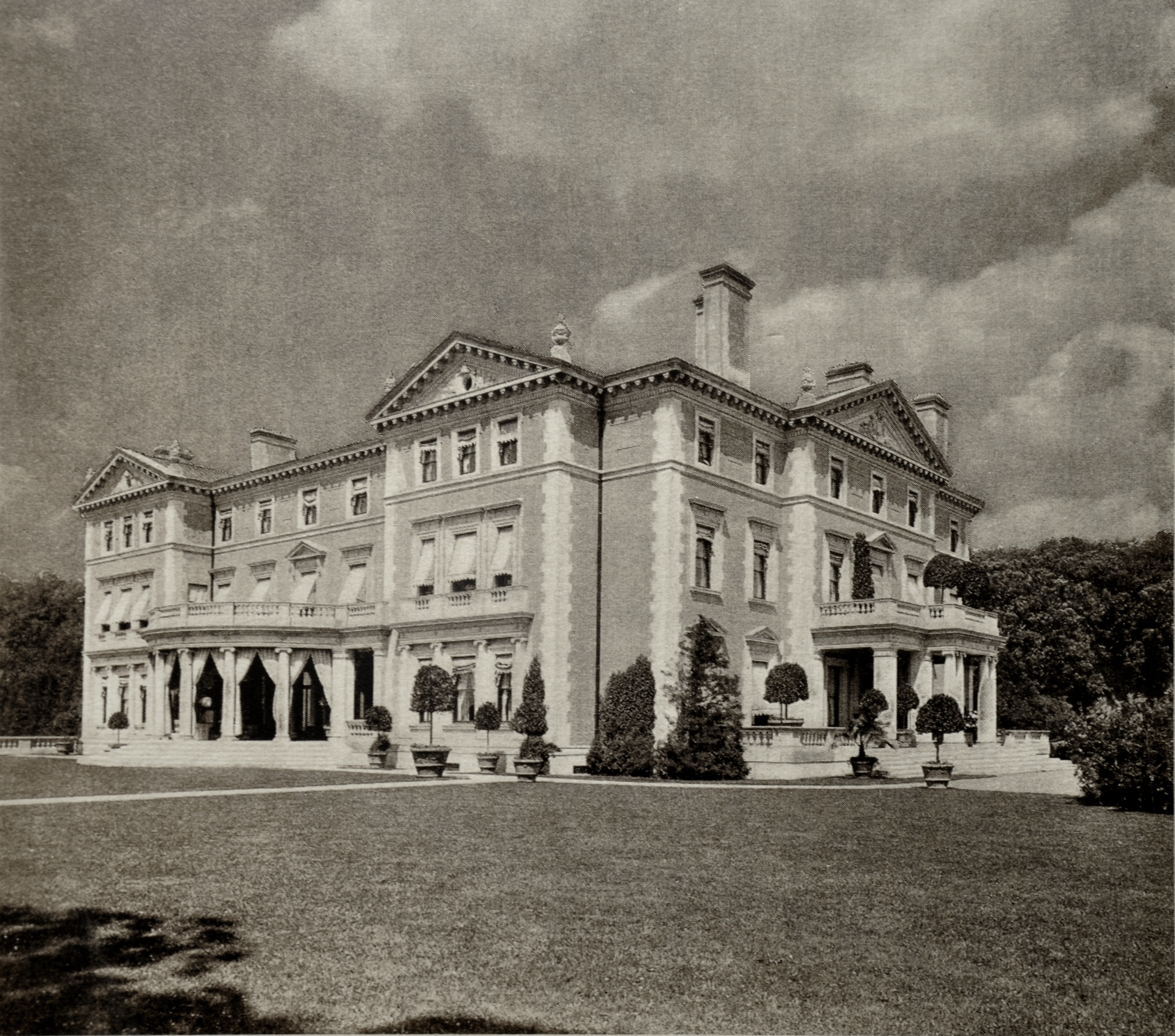
Woodlea, her home in Briarcliff Manor, New York, in 1895

On February 18, 1868, Margaret Louisa was married to Elliott Fitch Shepard (1833–1893) in the Church of the Incarnation in New York. He was the son of Fitch Shepard and Delia Maria Dennis. Shepard was a lawyer, banker, and owner of the Mail and Express newspaper, as well as a founder and president of the New York State Bar Association. Together, they had five daughters and one son:

- Florence Shepard (1869–1869), who died young.
- Maria Louise Shepard (1870–1948), who married William Jay Schieffelin (1866–1955), a descendant of John Jay.
- Edith Shepard (1872–1954), who married Ernesto Fabbri (1874–1943).
- Margaret Shepard (1873–1895), who died unmarried of pneumonia.
- Alice Louise Shepard (1874–1950), who married Dave Hennen Morris (1872–1944), the U.S. Ambassador to Belgium and son of John Albert Morris.
- Elliot Fitch Shepard, Jr. (1877–1927), who married Esther Potter, and after their divorce, Eleanor Leigh Terradell (1882–1962).

Margaret died at her apartment on 998 Fifth Avenue in Manhattan on March 3, 1924. She is buried in the Vanderbilt Private Section, a burial ground just outside the Vanderbilt Mausoleum Moravian Cemetery, Staten Island. At her death, she left over $5,000,000 in trust to her daughters. She donated $180,000 to charities, $20,000 to each of her sixteen grandchildren, and $100,000 to the Scarborough Presbyterian Church, in addition to the $100,000 left to the Church upon her husband's death in 1893.

=== Residences ===
The Shepards owned a townhouse (double mansion) (1882) on Fifth Avenue and 52nd Street designed by John B. Snook, provided to them by her father and shared with her sister Emily Thorn Vanderbilt, who was married to William Douglas Sloane and, after his death, Henry White, the American Ambassador to France and Italy, and a signatory of the Treaty of Versailles.

They also owned Woodlea, built between 1892 and 1895, a McKim, Mead & White-designed country estate in Scarborough, New York, a neighborhood of Briarcliff Manor. The estate is now operated as Sleepy Hollow Country Club.
