= Dave Hennen Morris =

American lawyer, diplomat and racehorse owner

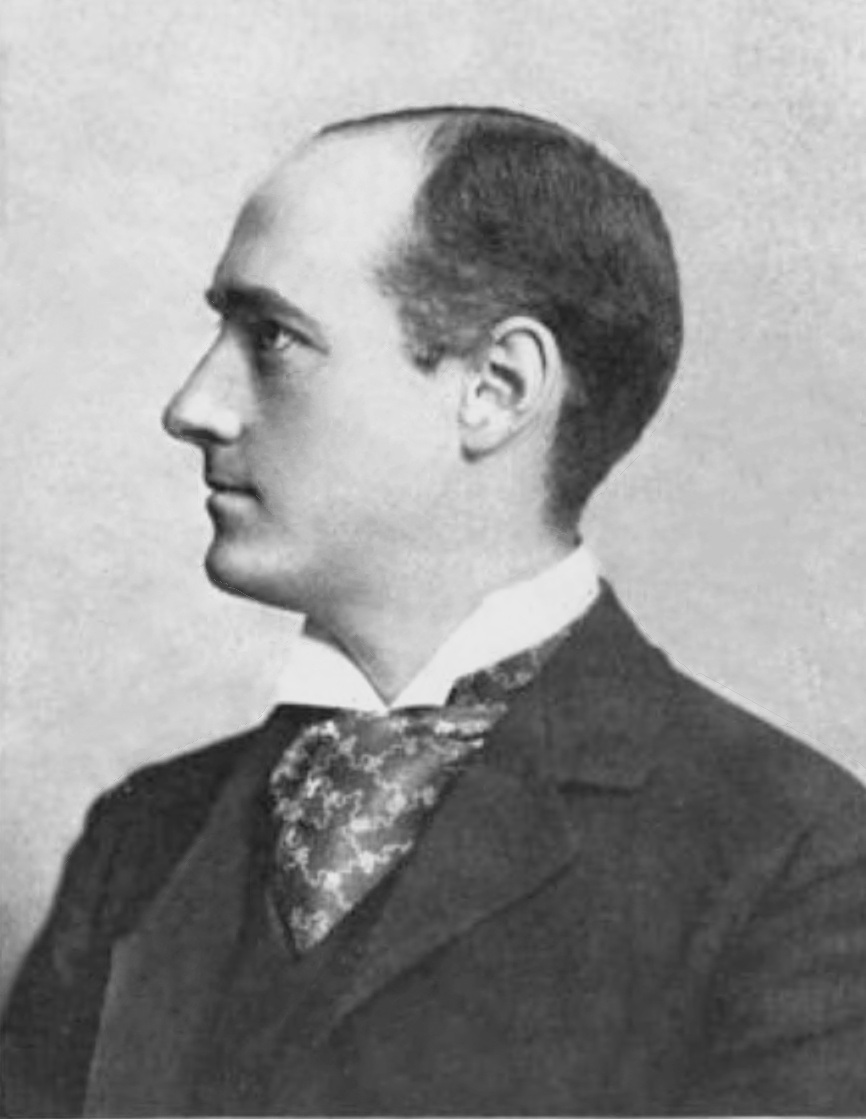

United States Ambassador to Belgium and Envoy to Luxembourg
- In office July 6, 1933 – May 5, 1937
- President: Franklin D. Roosevelt
- Preceded by: Hugh S. Gibson
- Succeeded by: Hugh S. Gibson

Personal details
- Born: April 24, 1872 New Orleans, Louisiana, U.S.
- Died: May 4, 1944 (aged 72) New York City, U.S.
- Party: Democratic
- Spouse: Alice Vanderbilt Shepard (m. 1895)
- Children: Dave Hennen Jr., Louise, Lawrence, Noel, Emily, Alice
- Parent(s): John Albert Morris; Cora Hennen
- Education: Harvard University; Columbia University; New York Law School
- Occupation: Lawyer, businessman, diplomat, racehorse owner
- Known for: Co-founder of IALA

Dave Hennen Morris (April 24, 1872 – May 4, 1944) was an American lawyer, diplomat, and Thoroughbred racehorse owner who co-founded the International Auxiliary Language Association (IALA).

== Early life ==
Morris was born in New Orleans, Louisiana, on April 24, 1872. He was the son of John Albert Morris and Cora Hennen, the daughter of prominent New Orleans Judge Alfred Hennen. His father was descended from the colonial Morris family of Morrisania. His siblings included Alfred Hennen Morris (1864–1959), a vice-chairman and steward of the Jockey Club, and Frances Isabel Morris, who married Lewis Cass Ledyard (1851–1932), the prominent attorney.

He graduated, magna cum laude, from Harvard University in 1896, from New York Law School in 1901 and was admitted to the New York Bar. Later, he earned a master's degree in constitutional law from Columbia University in 1909.

== Career ==
Following his father's death in 1895, Dave Morris inherited considerable wealth and held business interests in railroads, hotels, and other enterprises. He was vice-president of the St. Louis Southwestern Railway Co. (Cotton Belt Route).

From 1933 to 1937, he was appointed the United States Ambassador to Belgium and Envoy Extraordinary and Minister Plenipotentiary to Luxembourg by his friend, Franklin D. Roosevelt. During this joint appointment, he resided in Belgium, where he and his wife continued to make international contacts for the language that would later take the name Interlingua. He also was vice president of the Research Corporation and counselor of the Belgian-American Educational Foundation, where Ezra Clark Stillman was secretary.

Morris was a founder of the Aero Club of America and of the Automobile Club of America. Along with his wife Alice, he co-founded the International Auxiliary Language Association, which in 1951 would present Interlingua to the general public. He was treasurer of the IALA from its establishment in 1924 to his death in 1944. His son, Lawrence, then assumed the position.

=== Thoroughbred horse racing ===
His father was a prominent figure in Thoroughbred horse racing who owned Morris Park Racetrack in The Bronx, New York. Dave Morris and brother Alfred, a vice-chairman and steward of the Jockey Club, owned, bred, and raced a number of successful Thoroughbreds. Among their major racing wins were the 1898 Belmont Stakes with Bowling Brook, and the 1899 Kentucky Derby with Manuel.

== Personal life ==
In 1895, Morris was married to Alice Vanderbilt Shepard (1874–1950). She was the daughter of Elliot Fitch Shepard (1833–1893), a lawyer, banker, and owner of the Mail and Express newspaper, as well as a founder and president of the New York State Bar Association, and Margaret Louisa Vanderbilt (1845–1924), who did not approve of her daughter marrying Morris. Alice was a granddaughter of William Henry Vanderbilt. Together, they were the parents of:

- Dave Hennen Morris Jr. (1900–1975), who married Alice Agnew in 1926. They divorced and he married Mary Josephine Dority (1907–1979).
- Louise Morris (1901–1976), who married Dudley Holbrook Mills (1894–1987) in 1922.
- Lawrence Morris (1903–1967), who married Ruth Spafford Whittmeyer, daughter of Joseph H. Spafford, in 1953.
- Ralph Noel Morris (1904–1928), who died by suicide at the age of twenty-four in 1928.
- Emily Hammond Morris (1907–1995), who married Hamilton Hadley (1896–1975), son of Arthur T. Hadley, President of Yale University, in 1929.
- Alice Vanderbilt Morris (1911–1986), who married Walter Knight Sturges Jr. (1909–1992), an architect, in 1939.

Morris died at his home, 19 East 70th Street in Manhattan, on May 4, 1944. His widow died in Bar Harbor, Maine, in August 1950.

Diplomatic posts
Preceded by Hugh Simons Gibson	U.S. Ambassador to Belgium; 1933–1937	Succeeded by Hugh Simons Gibson
