= Vanderbilt Triple Palace =

Mansion in Manhattan, New York (1882–1947)

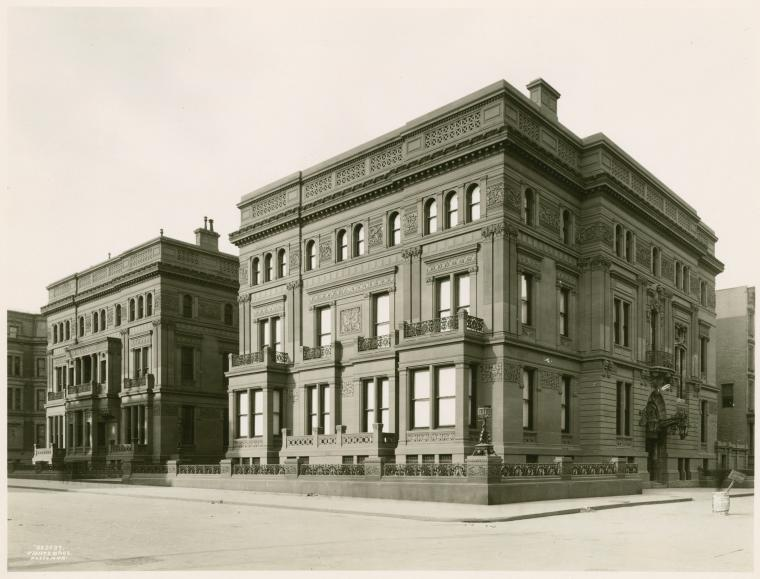
- Interactive map of the Vanderbilt Triple Palace area

General information
- Status: Demolished
- Location: 640 and 642 Fifth Ave., 2 West 52nd St., Manhattan, New York City
- Coordinates: 40.759609°N 73.976805°W
- Construction started: 1880
- Completed: 1882
- Demolished: 1947
- Owner: William Henry Vanderbilt; George Washington Vanderbilt; Cornelius Vanderbilt III

Design and construction
- Architects: John B. Snook, Charles B. Atwood

Renovating team
- Architects: Hunt & Hunt (1902, 1905); Horace Trumbauer (1915–1916)

The Triple Palace, also known as the William H. Vanderbilt House, was an elaborate mansion at 640 Fifth Avenue between 51st Street and 52nd Street in Midtown Manhattan, New York City. The urban mansion, completed in 1882 to designs by John B. Snook and Charles B. Atwood, was owned by members of the Vanderbilt family. It was composed of two portions: a single-family unit to the south and a two-family unit to the north. William Henry Vanderbilt owned and lived in the southern portion. Two of his daughters, Emily Thorn Vanderbilt and Margaret Louisa Vanderbilt Shepard, along with their respective families, occupied the two residences in the northern portion.

The mansion had a brownstone facade as well as a courtyard and portico separating the two sections. William Henry Vanderbilt's portion of the house had elaborate decor, with 58 rooms designed in a different style, as well as a central three-story art gallery with a large skylight. William Henry's section also included an elaborate dining room, library, parlor, and drawing room on the first floor, as well as bedrooms on the second floor for himself, his wife, and his youngest children. Emily's and Margaret's sections of the house were designed in a less lavish style.

William Henry Vanderbilt had commissioned the mansion in part to provide space for his paintings, as well as a residence for his two daughters. Upon its completion, the mansion was generally criticized. After William Henry's death in 1885, the house passed on to numerous members of his family. It became known as the home of Henry Clay Frick, who renovated and rented the house from 1905 to 1913, after which he built the Henry Clay Frick House. Cornelius Vanderbilt III hired Horace Trumbauer to design another renovation for the house in 1916. The northern section of the Vanderbilt house was demolished in 1927, while the southern section was destroyed in 1947; both sections were replaced by high-rise buildings.

== Architecture ==
The William H. Vanderbilt House occupied the entire east side of the block bounded by 51st Street to the south, 52nd Street to the north, Fifth Avenue to the east, and Sixth Avenue to the west. The house was described in popular press as two mansions and known as the "Triple Palace" or the "Vanderbilt Twins". However, the structure was a single mansion built at one time, with three residential units across two sections.

William Henry Vanderbilt hired John B. Snook and Charles B. Atwood to design and furnish the mansion, and he hired the Herter Brothers to decorate the space. Snook was the architect of record for the mansion, but there is evidence of both Atwood's and the Herter Brothers' involvement. The Herter Brothers disputed the claim that either Snook or Atwood were responsible for the overall design. When the Herter Brothers wrote American Architect and Building News to complain, the journal's editors pointed out that Atwood and Snook's names were listed on the building permit for the house.

=== Layout and courtyard ===
The mansion occupied a site of 200 by 150 feet (61 by 46 m). The southern section at 640 Fifth Avenue was a single-family unit, occupied by William Henry Vanderbilt, his wife Maria Louisa Kissam, and their youngest son George. The southern section measured 115 feet (35 m) deep and either 80 feet (24 m) or 74 feet (23 m) wide. The northern section contained a pair of units occupied by the families of two of Vanderbilt's daughters. The unit at 642 Fifth Avenue was occupied by Emily Thorn Vanderbilt and her husband William Douglas Sloane, while that at 2 West 52nd Street was occupied by Margaret Louisa Vanderbilt and her husband Elliott Fitch Shepard. The northern section was slightly narrower than the southern one. Both sections were connected at the first story, but the upper stories were disconnected from each other. The doors separating the three residences could be opened to create a large event space.

A short balustrade and a planting strip separated the mansion from the Fifth Avenue sidewalk, though this was removed in 1911. Bronze lighting fixtures were mounted atop the pillars of the balustrade, and metal fencing was installed between the pillars. When the mansion was completed, it was surrounded on all sides by grass.

Between the two sections on Fifth Avenue was a courtyard leading to an entrance portico. A pavement stone in front of the portico measured 44,000 pounds (20,000 kg), with dimensions of 25.16 by 15 feet (7.67 by 4.57 m). The stone, supposedly the largest ever quarried in the United States, was transported to the construction site by barge since it could not fit on a train. Nearby were numerous similarly large stones, measuring on average 12 to 13 feet (3.7 to 4.0 m) wide and 15 feet (4.6 m) long. A New York Times reporter said the stones had been laid "on three parallel walls of solid rock". Right in front of the portico was a large bluestone entrance step measuring 24.16 by 3.5 feet (7.36 by 1.07 m) across. The portico served as the southern section's entrance, while the northern section was accessed from 52nd Street.

=== Facade ===
The house was designed in the Doric and Corinthian styles with a facade made of Connecticut brownstone. Snook and Atwood had originally planned to face the building in light Ohio limestone with red and black limestone trim. However, William Henry Vanderbilt had changed the plans at the last minute because he wanted a distinctive, cheap, and familiar material. The foundation walls were made of stone laid in sand and cement, resting on natural rock. The upper walls ranged in thickness from 36 to 8 inches (910 to 200 mm). The firm of H & A. S. Dickinson quarried the brownstone for the building.

Horizontal string courses divided the three main stories of the facade on all sides. Near the top of the ground-floor windows was an entablature with carvings of vines, which wrapped around all sides. The second-story windows were decorated with acanthus leaves. The ground- and second-story windows were originally complemented with vases containing flowers. Above the third story was an entablature with a blind frieze, followed by a blind attic. A cornice decorated with lions' heads, as well as a perforated parapet, ran above the attic on all sides. The top of the building had a flat roofline surrounded by a balustrade. The roof was about 75 feet (23 m) above the sidewalk and was made of red tiles.

Along the Fifth Avenue elevation, the central portion of either section was recessed from the outer windows. The ground level had square-headed window openings that, about two-thirds of the way up, were interspersed with the entablature. The second-story openings were flanked by pilasters and topped by carved lintels. The capitals atop the pilasters were ornately carved. The third-story openings had round-headed arches that were flanked by carved panels and topped by narrow archivolts. Midway up the third story, a carved frieze ran horizontally across the facade.

=== Features ===
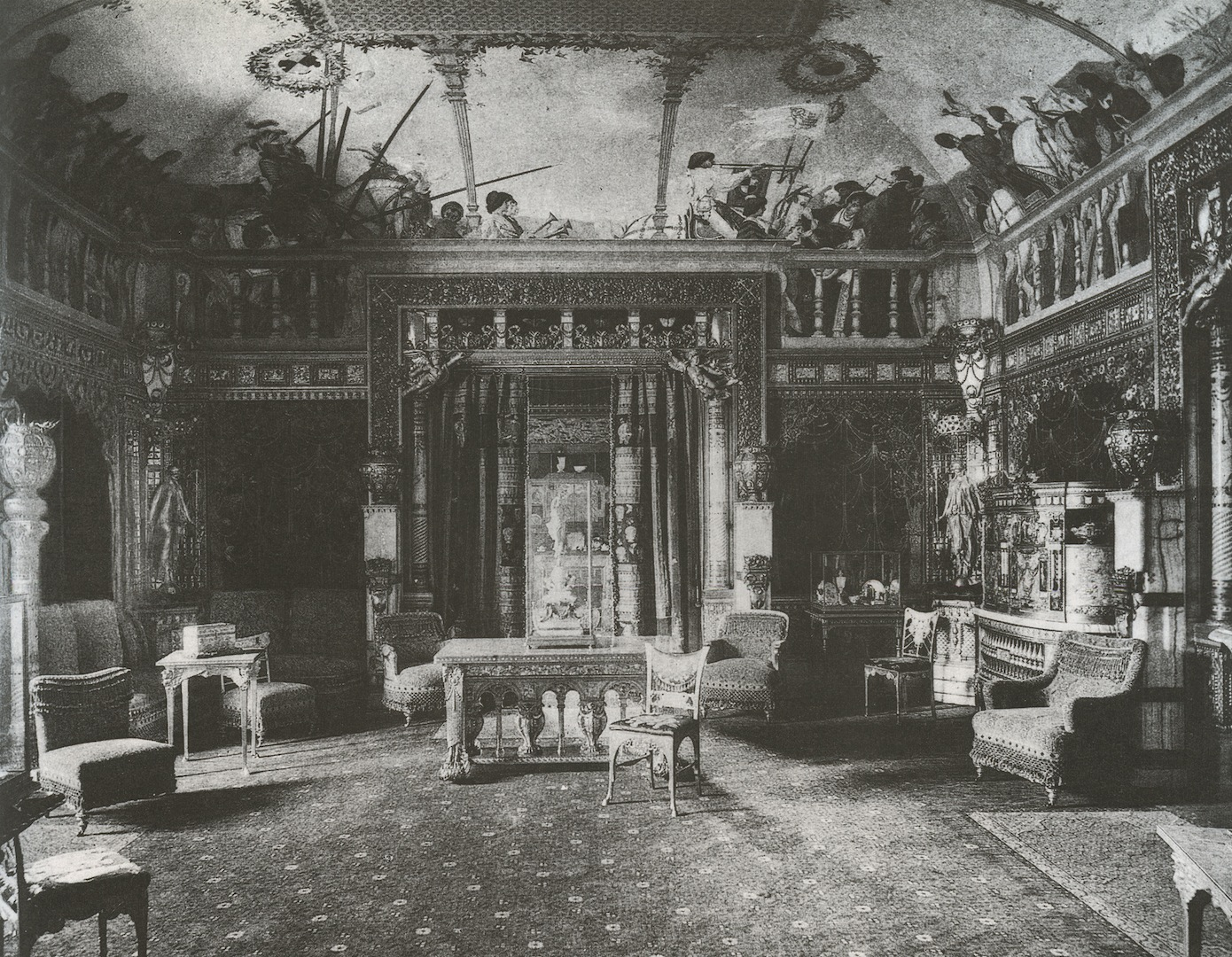
William H. Vanderbilt's drawing room with ceiling painted by Pierre-Victor Galland

William H. Vanderbilt's residence in the southern section had elaborate decor, including an extensive art collection. There were 58 rooms in the southern residence, each designed in a different style. The Nashville Daily American described the northern section's decorations as being ornate but "less utterly utter" than those in the southern section.

Shortly after the house was completed, a ten-volume series entitled Mr. Vanderbilt's House and Collection was privately published, which documented the William H. Vanderbilt house and art collection. One thousand copies were printed of the series, which art historian Earl Shinn authored under the pen name "Edward Strahan". The industrialist Henry Clay Frick had a noted admiration for the mansion, its art collection, and William Henry Vanderbilt's status. The building and art collection prompted Frick to create his own mansion and art collection, today a public museum known as the Frick Collection. Frick also purchased four volumes of the Mr. Vanderbilt series, as well as twenty satin reproductions of paintings in Vanderbilt's collection. Some of these were hung at Clayton, Frick's house in Pittsburgh.

==== Structural features ====
The superstructure of the Triple Palace consisted of wrought-iron beams supporting the floors and roof. The floor beams were designed to be capable of supporting 150 to 175 pounds per square foot (7.2 to 8.4 kPa) while the roof beams were designed to support 125 pounds per square foot (6.0 kPa). "Fireproof material" such as brick arches was infilled between the wrought-iron beams. The brick partition walls were designed to be at least 16 inches (410 mm) thick. Much of the ornamentation was made in papier-mâché rather than plaster. The entire house was steam-heated, except for the conservatory in the northern portion of the building, which was heated by hot water.

The basement was blasted out of solid rock and measured 9.5 feet (2.9 m) tall. The basement contained numerous rooms, including a kitchen, staff rooms, coal vaults, and mechanical rooms for the elevators and electricity. The basement also included storage closets, wine cellars, laundry and drying rooms, furnace rooms, and pantries. The first floor had a ceiling 16 feet (4.9 m) tall. Ceiling heights decreased at subsequent stories, with the second story being 15 feet (4.6 m) tall, the third story being 12 feet (3.7 m) tall, and the attic being 8 feet (2.4 m) tall.

==== Entrance vestibule ====
The portico from Fifth Avenue led to an entrance vestibule between the two sections, from which the southern half of the house was accessed. It had an exterior of brownstone, like the rest of the house, but the front elevation was not enclosed. The floor of the vestibule was paved in marble mosaic tiles. Mosaics also decorated the vestibule's walls. The vestibule's ceiling was a skylight made of stained glass and iron, (Note: According to The Washington Post, the ceiling was made of stained glass and bronze.) just below the second story of the house. The ceiling was infilled with mosaic was made by Facchina of Venice.

The center of the vestibule featured a malachite vase measuring 9 feet (2.7 m) tall. The vase was acquired from the collection of Pavel Nikolaievich Demidov and had been made by Pierre-Philippe Thomire. On the south wall was a large pair of doors leading to a hallway in William Henry Vanderbilt's residence. Inspired by Lorenzo Ghiberti's Gates of Paradise in Florence, the doors cost $25,000 (equivalent to $699,000 in 2024) and were reported by contemporary media as being made of bronze. The art historian E. Wayne Craven wrote that the doors were really just "thin metal screwed to a common wooden frame".

==== Ground floor ====
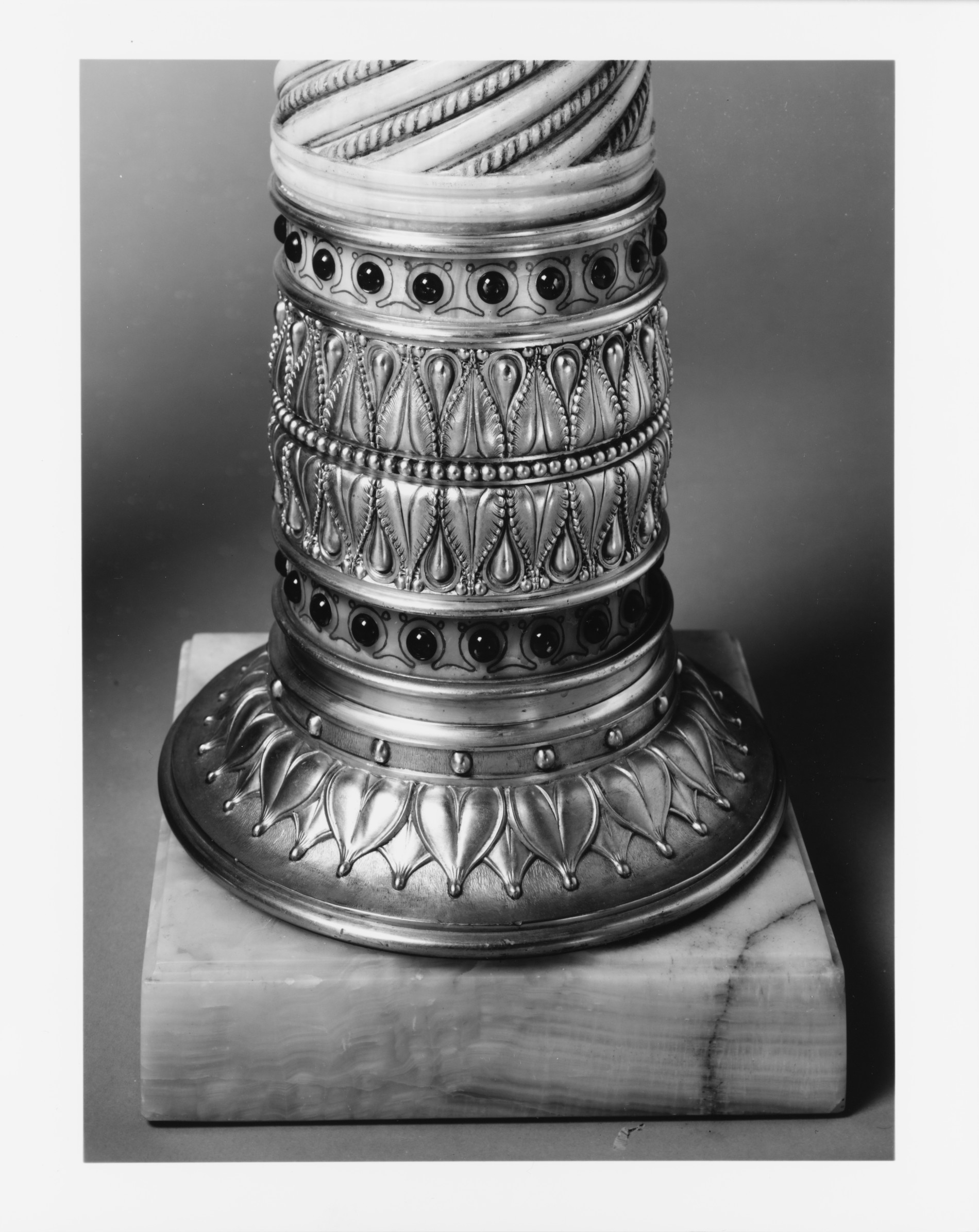
Preserved piece of pedestal from the drawing room

The "bronze" doors opened into a hallway in the southern section, with marble tiling and wood paneling. The south wall, opposite the entrance door, had a large fireplace with a mantelpiece made of marble, as well as bronze reliefs of female figures flanking a marble shaft. To the right was a stairway to the upper floors, while to the left was a set of carved oaken seats and a door leading to the drawing room. Throughout the hallway were iron columns with red polished marble, which supported architectural galleries on the upper stories.

Extending west from the southern section's hallway was the art gallery, measuring 32 by 48 feet (9.8 by 14.6 m). The gallery was described as being 33 or 35 feet (10 or 11 m) high; at night, it was lit by 169 gas jets. The gallery originally featured 207 oils and watercolors from various European artists. Art was hung salon-style in the gallery. Despite the size of the gallery, Vanderbilt's collection soon grew to require an additional smaller gallery to show watercolors and drawings. The art gallery had its own entrance from 51st Street. Attached to the art gallery was an "aquarella room" of 15 by 32 feet (4.6 by 9.8 m), separated from the gallery by an archway, as well as a conservatory room on the opposite wall.

The south side of the hallway led to the southern section's main dining room, which measured 28 by 36 feet (8.5 by 11.0 m) and had wood wainscoting, a fireplace with carved mantel, and tapestries and paintings. The south dining room had an elliptical arched ceiling, which was divided into panels with carved fruit and foliate motifs. A butler's pantry abutted the dining room.

The eastern portion of the southern section's hallway led to a drawing room, parlor, and library facing Fifth Avenue. The drawing room measured 25 by 31 feet (7.6 by 9.4 m) and had red velvet walls with mother-of-pearl butterflies; a red carpet; and a ceiling mural painted by Pierre-Victor Galland. The mother-of-pearl appeared to make the decorations glow whenever the room was illuminated. North of the drawing room was a library, which contained furniture inlaid with mother-of-pearl. The rosewood library table was decorated with designs of six continents, and the chairs and wallpaper contained hangings. South of the drawing room was a Japanese-themed parlor with hanging tapestries and lacquered cabinets, as well as a faux bamboo ceiling with rafters stained to resemble red lacquer.

The double unit in the northern section was designed with mirrored parlors, libraries, dining rooms, and reception rooms on the ground floor. A butler's pantry was located off the dining rooms, while a billiards room was in the rear of the double residence.

==== Upper stories ====
The southern section's grand staircase had an ornate oak balustrade as well as an overhead frieze. This stairway wrapped around a light well that measured perhaps 60 by 40 feet (18 by 12 m) wide. The stairway was lit by the skylight above the light well, which was decorated in crimson and gold brick. The bottom of the grand staircase had a bronze newel that was sculpted in the figure of a girl. At intermediate landings, John La Farge designed nine stained-glass windows. Those on the first landing depicted the "fruits of commerce" that had made the Vanderbilts wealthy, while the second-story landing depicted hospitality and prosperity.

The rooms on the southern section's second floor were designed with varying fittings and decorations, and each member of the family had their own room, with Maria's being the most ornate. Mrs. Vanderbilt's room faced the corner of Fifth Avenue and 51st Street and contained wooden cabinetry from France, a wainscoted wall topped by satins and tapestries, and a ceiling mural by Jules Lefebvre. William Henry Vanderbilt's room, over the dining room, had polished brass and mahogany finishes. Cornelius's room was decorated in dark mahogany and consisted of a study and attached bedroom. Another room was decorated in rosewood inlaid with mother-of-pearl; it was meant for another of W.H. Vanderbilt's daughters, Eliza, who had gotten married before the house was finished.

The southern section's third floor had guest rooms that surrounded the light well. Each room was finished in cabinet wood and had frescoes in different styles, with carved dressers supporting large mirrors. Each dressing room on the third floor was connected to two bedrooms. A steep stairway, similar to a ladder, led from the third floor onto the roof. The northern section's upper floors generally had sitting, sewing, and dressing rooms, as well as chambers and nurseries. The double residence had a conservatory, measuring 15 by 40 feet (4.6 by 12.2 m), at its southwestern corner.

== History ==
The portion of Fifth Avenue in Midtown became an upscale residential area following the American Civil War. Among the residents that moved to the area was William Henry Vanderbilt, who in 1877 inherited $90 million (equivalent to $2.439 billion in 2024) upon the death of his father, railroad magnate Cornelius Vanderbilt. William Henry Vanderbilt wanted to build a large house for his wife, Maria Louisa Kissam, but this was delayed by a lengthy lawsuit over Cornelius's will. Vanderbilt's extensive art collections required space, leading his wife to insist they add a wing to their existing house at 459 Fifth Avenue for their paintings.

=== 19th century ===
==== Construction ====
In January 1879, Vanderbilt bought a land lot on the west side of Fifth Avenue between 51st and 52nd Streets. The lot, which stood diagonally across Fifth Avenue and 51st Street from the then-new St. Patrick's Cathedral, had once been owned by sheep farmer Isaiah Keyser. The site had cost $500,000 (equivalent to $13,973,000 in 2024); it had originally been marketed at $800,000 prior to the Panic of 1873. His elder sons Cornelius and William Kissam were simultaneously planning the Cornelius Vanderbilt II House five blocks north and the William K. Vanderbilt House one block north. By April 1879, existing tenants were being forced to leave. That December, William Henry Vanderbilt filed plans for a mansion between 51st and 52nd Streets, with a single unit and a double unit.

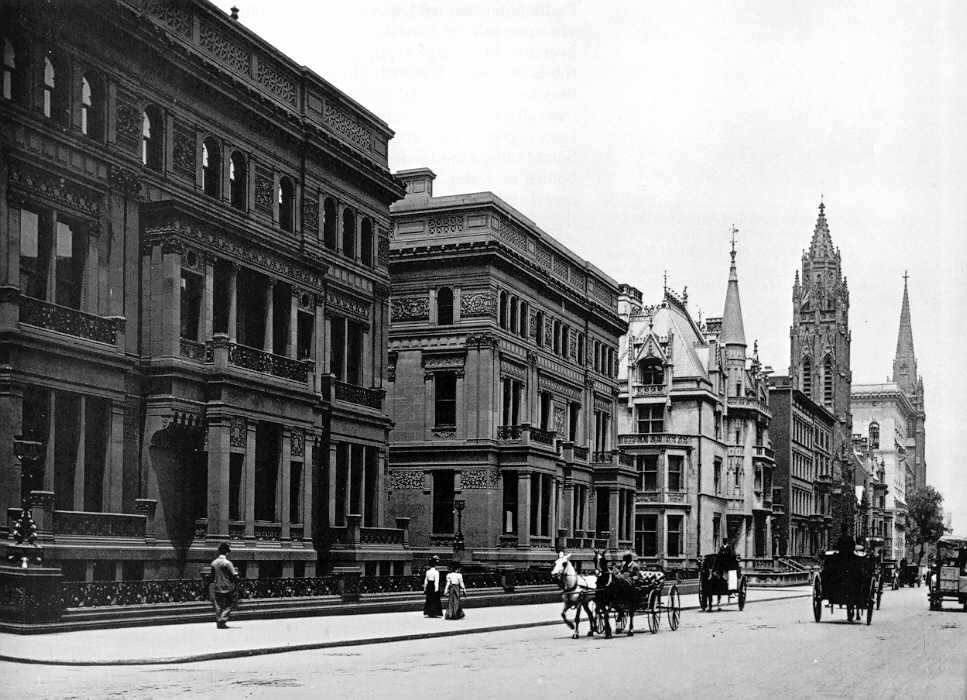
The Triple Palace as seen from Fifth Avenue circa 1885. W.H. Vanderbilt's residence (the single residence) is at left, while the double residence for two of his daughters is in the center. At right can be seen the William K. Vanderbilt House and St. Thomas Church.

Over the following one-and-a-half years, more than 600 workers constructed the building. In addition, 60 European sculptors were hired to sculpt the decorations on the facade and interior. The total number of workers was estimated at between 600 and 700, of which 250 were hired just for decorating the interior. William Henry was deeply involved in the mansion's construction, visiting the work site daily and observing the work ongoing at the Herter Brothers workrooms for hours at a time. This led William Baumgarten of the Herter Brothers to say in 1885, "We have rarely had a customer who took such a personal interest in the work during its progress." By the middle of 1881, the Fifth Avenue facade of the Triple Palace was being constructed, and nineteen large blocks of brownstone had been set in place. The work ultimately cost $2 million (equivalent to $55,893,000 in 2024), about two-thirds of which was spent on the interior of William Henry's residence.

==== 1880s and 1890s ====
William Henry, Maria, and George Vanderbilt were occupying the southern half of the mansion by January 1882. (Note: Though contemporary news sources give a date of 1882, Wayne Craven gives a date of January 1881.) His daughters moved into their own respective residences at that time. The Washington Post wrote at the time, "What would, it is said, in any European country have taken from five to ten years to accomplish has been done here in a little more than two years." They held a large reception at their portion of the mansion in March 1882. A subsequent New York Herald Tribune article said that the two decades following the mansion's opening comprised one of the two "great periods" of the house's existence.

The art collection grew quickly and, in March 1883, Snook filed plans for additions to Vanderbilt's gallery and the northern section's conservatory. Vanderbilt hosted a ball with 1,000 guests on December 11, 1883. He marked the opening of his new art gallery nine days later with a reception to which 3,000 people were invited. Vanderbilt intended his house and art collection to be more imposing than those of the late Alexander Turney Stewart. When the house was completed, the public could visit the art gallery in the southern portion on Thursdays between 11 a.m. and 4 p.m., though only by invitation. After some instances of visitor misbehavior, Vanderbilt stopped inviting people to see his art collection.

Less than five years after moving into the mansion, in December 1885, W.H. Vanderbilt suddenly died. As part of his will, Maria received a life interest in the property. His youngest son George, who did not yet have a grand mansion of his own, had a future interest, which meant he would obtain the Triple Palace upon Maria's death. His daughters were bequeathed the houses in which they resided. W.H. Vanderbilt's will stipulated that the mansion and collection pass to his son's sons, or another grandson, to stay in the family. Only Maria and George Vanderbilt continued to live in the southern portion of the house afterward, though they privately invited people to see the art collection. The residence still hosted events such as a dinner for the Architectural League of New York in 1889. Margaret and Elliott Shepard continued to live in the northern section of the mansion with their youngest children until Elliott died there in 1893. Some time afterward, Margaret sold her family's portion of the northern section to Emily.

In 1896, Maria Vanderbilt died and George received title to the southern section of the house. George already had a townhouse by then, and he did not wish to live in the mansion, which had unfashionable decor by this point. Furthermore, by the turn of the century, the surrounding section of Fifth Avenue was becoming a commercial area. George was in the midst of creating the Biltmore mansion in North Carolina, but he was unable to sell his father's house under the terms of his father's will. In part to slow the further commercial development of the avenue, George Vanderbilt developed the Marble Twins immediately across Fifth Avenue at the turn of the 20th century. One of the Marble Twins was occupied by his sister Emily and her family, who had moved from the northern section of the Triple Palace.

=== 20th century ===
In 1902, George lent 135 works from the mansion's 640-piece collection to the Metropolitan Museum of Art. The same year, George announced plans to renovate the southern section of the mansion. The plans entailed adding another story, removing some facade ornamentation, replacing an exterior iron fence with stone, installing a new Fifth Avenue doorway to replace the existing entrances, and adding a porte cochere in the rear. The southern and northern halves of the mansion would be completely disconnected from each other, as the entrance from the central portico would be destroyed. The firm of Hunt & Hunt was hired for the renovation. While city officials initially approved the porte cochere, they subsequently ordered it demolished, saying it projected too far onto the Fifth Avenue sidewalk. George Vanderbilt secured an injunction in June 1903 to prevent its demolition, but he was compelled to take it down that September.

==== Frick lease ====
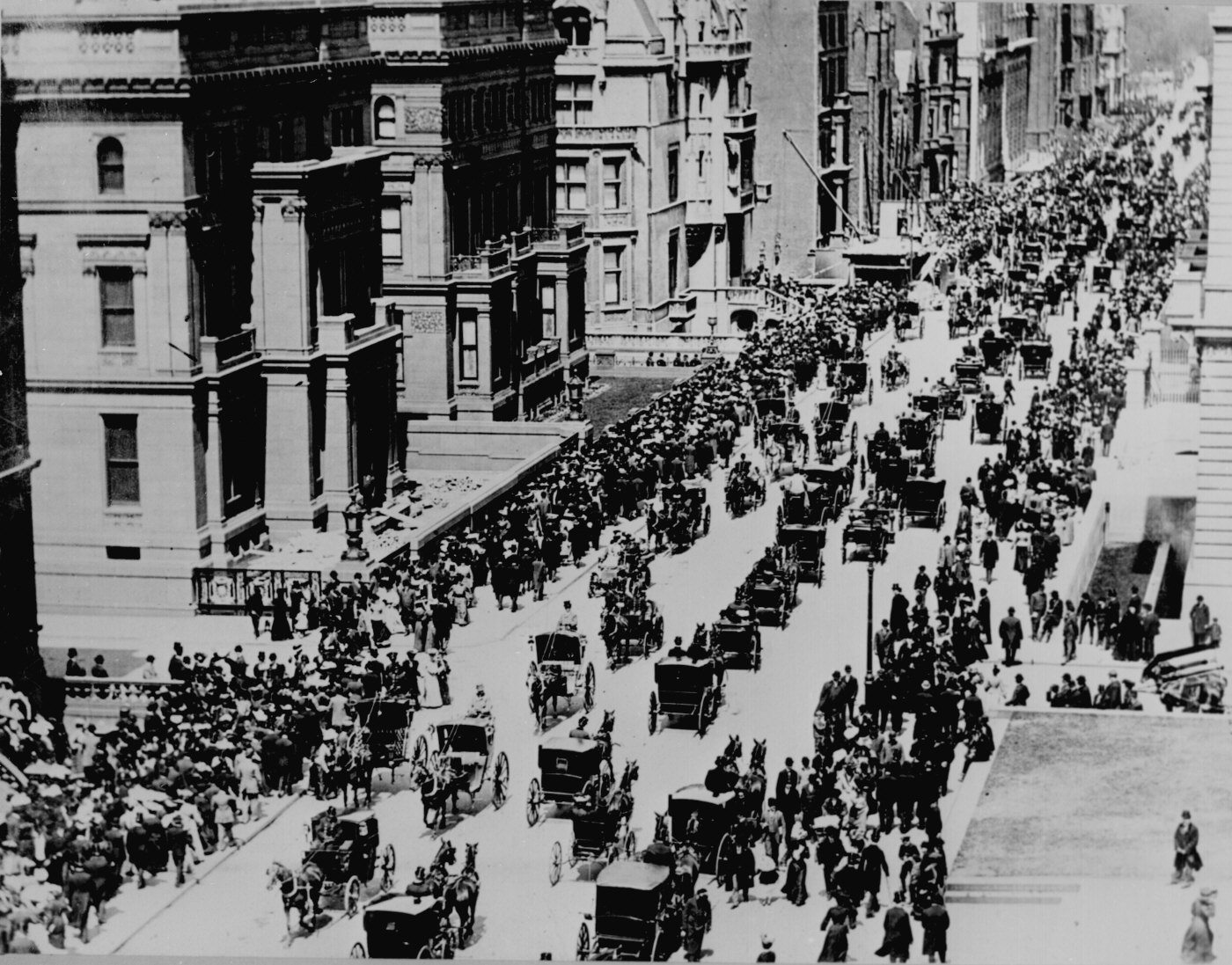
Seen at left in 1900

In January 1905, Douglas Robinson of Robinson, Brown, and Co. notified Henry Clay Frick that the southern half of the mansion was available for rent. By this point, Frick was becoming a prominent businessman and was the largest private stockholder in the railroad industry. Frick's early obsession with the house, as well as the idea of living in the residence of the former art collector and "railroad king" William H. Vanderbilt, were strong reasons for Frick's move to rent the space. In March 1905, the media reported that Frick had leased the southern residence. Frick acquired a ten-year lease on the southern residence and its furnishings, with George Vanderbilt receiving $50,000 in rent per year (equivalent to $1,349,000 in 2024).

Frick and his wife renovated the southern portion of the mansion at a cost of $100,000 (equivalent to $2,698,000 in 2024), with plans and construction oversight by Hunt & Hunt. The work added newer amenities, including electric lighting and modern bathrooms. Frick also installed a high brownstone wall on Fifth Avenue for privacy, and he built a driveway leading from the avenue. The family moved into the building in October 1905, following the completion of the work. Frick attempted to purchase the house within a few years, but W.H. Vanderbilt's will still did not allow for the sale of the building, so the point was not pursued further. Frick acquired land for his new house and museum on the Upper East Side in 1906, and construction of that house began in 1913.

Immediately east of the Triple Palace, Fifth Avenue was widened in 1911, and Frick's driveway was cut back. In addition, the flower plantings and stone railing in front of the Triple Palace's northern section were removed. Around that time, the neighborhood was growing increasingly commercial. When George Vanderbilt unexpectedly died in 1914, the house passed to Cornelius Vanderbilt III, the next grandson of W.H. Vanderbilt, as George had no male heirs. (Note: George Vanderbilt had willed the house to the eldest living son of his brother Cornelius II. Though Cornelius III was the eldest son, his father had disinherited him for marrying Grace Graham Wilson. The property would have passed to Alfred Gwynne Vanderbilt had he not died in 1915.) Cornelius III took possession of the house that April. He requested Frick vacate the property, giving him several months to move. The Fricks moved to the Henry Clay Frick House in June 1914, where they remained until their deaths.

==== Later years ====
After Frick moved out, Cornelius III spent $500,000 (equivalent to $11,184,000 in 2024) to renovate the southern portion of the mansion, including $240,000 on physical alterations. Horace Trumbauer designed the renovation, for which he filed plans in 1915. The work involved creating a new entrance on the north side of the southern residence. Cornelius III's ownership marked the second "great period" of the house's history, as the New York Herald Tribune would later describe it. In subsequent years, the mansion's visitors included numerous heads of state, such as U.S. presidents Theodore Roosevelt and Herbert Hoover and British prime minister Winston Churchill, as well as various other leaders and royal family members.

Nevertheless, by the 1920s, the section of Fifth Avenue in Midtown was quickly becoming a commercial area. Taxes were rising accordingly, making the continued presence of residences in the area unaffordable. Emily Vanderbilt Sloane, now married to Henry White, sold the northern residence to Benjamin Winter for about $3.5 million (equivalent to $50 million in 2024) in January 1926. Winter began destroying the northern part of the house in 1927 to make way for a thirty-story office building.

Cornelius III sold the southern part of the house to the William Waldorf Astor estate in May 1940. The sale occurred despite William Henry's wishes for it to stay in the Vanderbilt family. The Astors wished to redevelop the site, which by then was surrounded by commercial developments, such as Rockefeller Center to the south. After the sale, the Vanderbilts hosted their final large events at the house. The interior of the house was opened to the public in July 1941, with a $1 admission fee to raise money for the United Service Organizations, and a benefit for the American Red Cross took place at the house in February 1942, with over a thousand guests. With Cornelius III's death in March 1942, "its days of magnificence were ended", according to the Herald Tribune.

In 1944, the Astors filed plans for a commercial property to replace the southern section of the house. The following year, Cornelius III's widow Grace sold the Vanderbilt art collection. The works sold for $323,195 (equivalent to $4,451,647 in 2024), a loss from the cost of acquiring the collection after adjustments for inflation. Among the buyers for the furnishings were Paramount Pictures, which bought the rare woods for its own use, as well as the Metropolitan Museum of Art, which received the malachite urn from the entrance vestibule. Demolition of the southern section began in September 1947, and the house had been totally razed by March 1949, when the cornerstone for the new building on the site was laid. News at the time expressed dismay in the loss of the building, though the media said it had long been an outdated remnant of a past time. It was replaced by 640 and 650 Fifth Avenue. The William H. Vanderbilt Mansion was the last of seven major Vanderbilt residences in the midtown section of Fifth Avenue when it was demolished.

== Critical reception ==
The house's architecture was reviewed negatively, especially in comparison to the homes of W. H. Vanderbilt's children. The interior was seen as vast and dark, with unfashionable decor. In 1881, Montgomery Schuyler wrote of the Triple Palace: "If these Vanderbilt houses are the result of intrusting architectural design to decorators, it is to be hoped the experiment may not be repeated." Schuyler particularly criticized the character of the brownstone facade, wondering "how so much good work [...] can be so ineffective". The following year, Clarence Cook dubbed the mansion a "gigantic knee-hole table", calling the design "discreditable to the profession of architecture" in the United States. Mariana Griswold Van Rensselaer, meanwhile, likened the mansion to "brown-stone packing boxes". Two decades after the house's completion, Herbert Croly wrote that the exterior was "far from interesting" while the brownstone "indicates a blind ignorance of the drift of American architectural advance".

Where critics were uninterested in the design of the exterior, they felt the interior to be overwhelming. One critic wrote: "One longs to find out if there is not one single room where there might be found some repose." Barbara Weinberg, in a late-20th-century retrospective on La Farge's work, said the home's design had "a taste dependent for expression of extreme wealth", with the decorations being derived more from foreign inspirations than from domestic inspirations.

There was some praise for the Triple Palace. In 1881, the Nashville Daily American described the house as a "gem" to "those in love with the symmetrical outlines of the improved Greek school", even as the newspaper acknowledged the house's "somber" character. A Providence Journal article from 1888 described the house as "beyond any question, the most superb house in New York".

== See also ==
- List of demolished buildings and structures in New York City
- List of Gilded Age mansions
- Vanderbilt houses
