= Elliott Fitch Shepard =

American lawyer and newspaper editor (1833–1893)

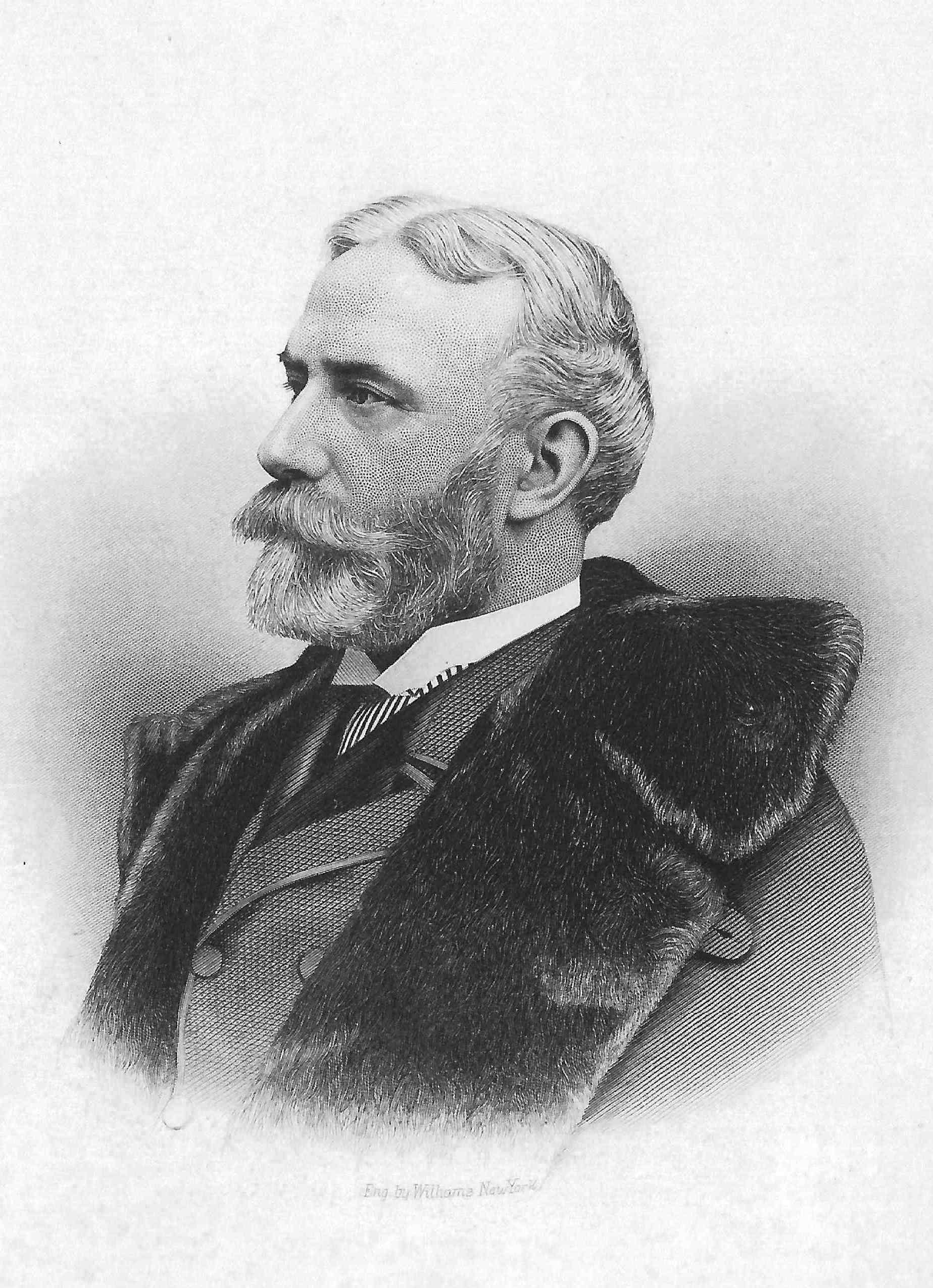
- Born: July 25, 1833; Jamestown, New York, US
- Died: March 24, 1893 (aged 59); New York City, US
- Burial place: Moravian Cemetery
- Education: University of the City of New York
- Occupations: lawyer, banker, newspaper owner
- Political party: Republican
- Spouse: Margaret Louisa Vanderbilt (m. 1868; w. 1893)
- Children: 6, including Alice, and Elliott Jr.

Elliott Fitch Shepard (Note: Other common spellings of his first name include "Eliot" and "Elliot"; "Shepherd" was sometimes used as his surname. Shepard was sometimes known as Elliott Fitch Shepard Sr., to distinguish him from his son.) (July 25, 1833 – March 24, 1893) was an American lawyer, banker, and owner of the Mail and Express newspaper, as well as a founder and president of the New York State Bar Association. Shepard was married to Margaret Louisa Vanderbilt, who was a member of the Vanderbilt family. Shepard's Briarcliff Manor residence Woodlea and the Scarborough Presbyterian Church, which he founded nearby, are contributing properties to the Scarborough Historic District.

Shepard was born in Jamestown, New York. He graduated from the University of the City of New York in 1855, and practiced law for about 25 years. During the American Civil War, Shepard was a Union Army recruiter and subsequently earned the rank of colonel. He was later a founder and benefactor of several institutions and banks. When Shepard moved to the Briarcliff Manor hamlet of Scarborough-on-Hudson, he founded the Scarborough Presbyterian Church and built Woodlea; the house and its land are now part of Sleepy Hollow Country Club.

== Early life ==
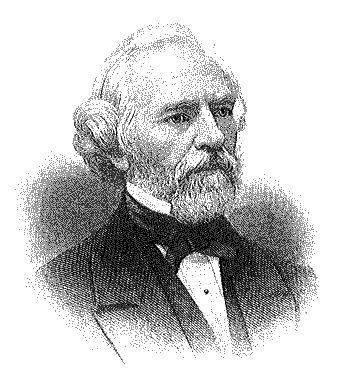
Fitch Shepard, father of Elliott Fitch Shepard

Shepard was born July 25, 1833, in Jamestown in Chautauqua County, New York. He was the second of three sons of Fitch Shepard and Delia Maria Dennis; the others were Burritt Hamilton and Augustus Dennis. Fitch Shepard was president of the National Bank Note Company (later consolidated with the American and Continental Note Companies), and Elliott's brother Augustus became president of the American Bank Note Company. Shepard's extended family lived in New England, with origins in Bedfordshire, England. Fitch, son of Noah Shepard, was a descendant of Thomas Shepard (a Puritan minister) and James Fitch (son-in-law of William Bradford). Delia Maria Dennis was a descendant of Robert Dennis, who emigrated from England in 1635. Elliott was described in 1897's Prominent Families of New York as "prominent by birth and ancestry, as well as for his personal qualities". He attended public schools in Jamestown, and moved with his father and brothers to New York City in 1845. He began attending the college-preparatory University Grammar School (then located in the University of the City of New York building), and graduated from the university in 1855. Shepard began reading law under Edwards Pierrepont, and was admitted to the bar in the city of Brooklyn in 1858.

== Military service ==
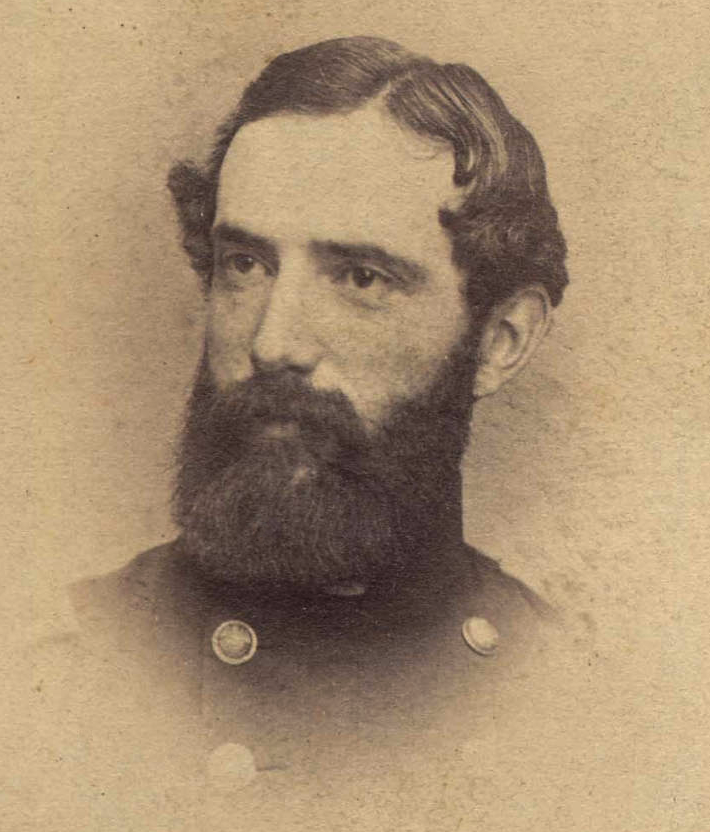
Shepard during the American Civil War, photographed by George G. Rockwood

From January 1861 through the outbreak of the American Civil War and until 1862 Shepard served as an aide-de-camp to Union Army General Edwin D. Morgan with the rank of colonel. During this time Shepard was placed in command of the department of volunteers in Elmira, and enlisted 47,000 men from the surrounding area. In 1862 he was appointed Assistant Inspector-General for half of New York state, reporting to New York's governor on troop organization, equipment, and discipline.

In 1862 he visited Jamestown to inspect, equip and provide uniforms for the Chautauqua regiment, his first return since infancy, and was welcomed by a group of prominent citizens. Shepard recruited and organized the 51st Regiment, New York Volunteers, which was named the Shepard Rifles in his honor. George W. Whitman, brother of the poet Walt Whitman and a member of the regiment, was notified by Shepard of a promotion; Shepard may have influenced his subsequent promotion to major in 1865. In addition, Shepard was involved in correspondence with Walt Whitman. Although President Abraham Lincoln offered him a promotion to brigadier general, Shepard declined in deference to officers who had seen field service; Shepard himself never entered the field. From 1866 to 1868 Shepard served as aide-de-camp to Reuben E. Fenton.

== Career ==
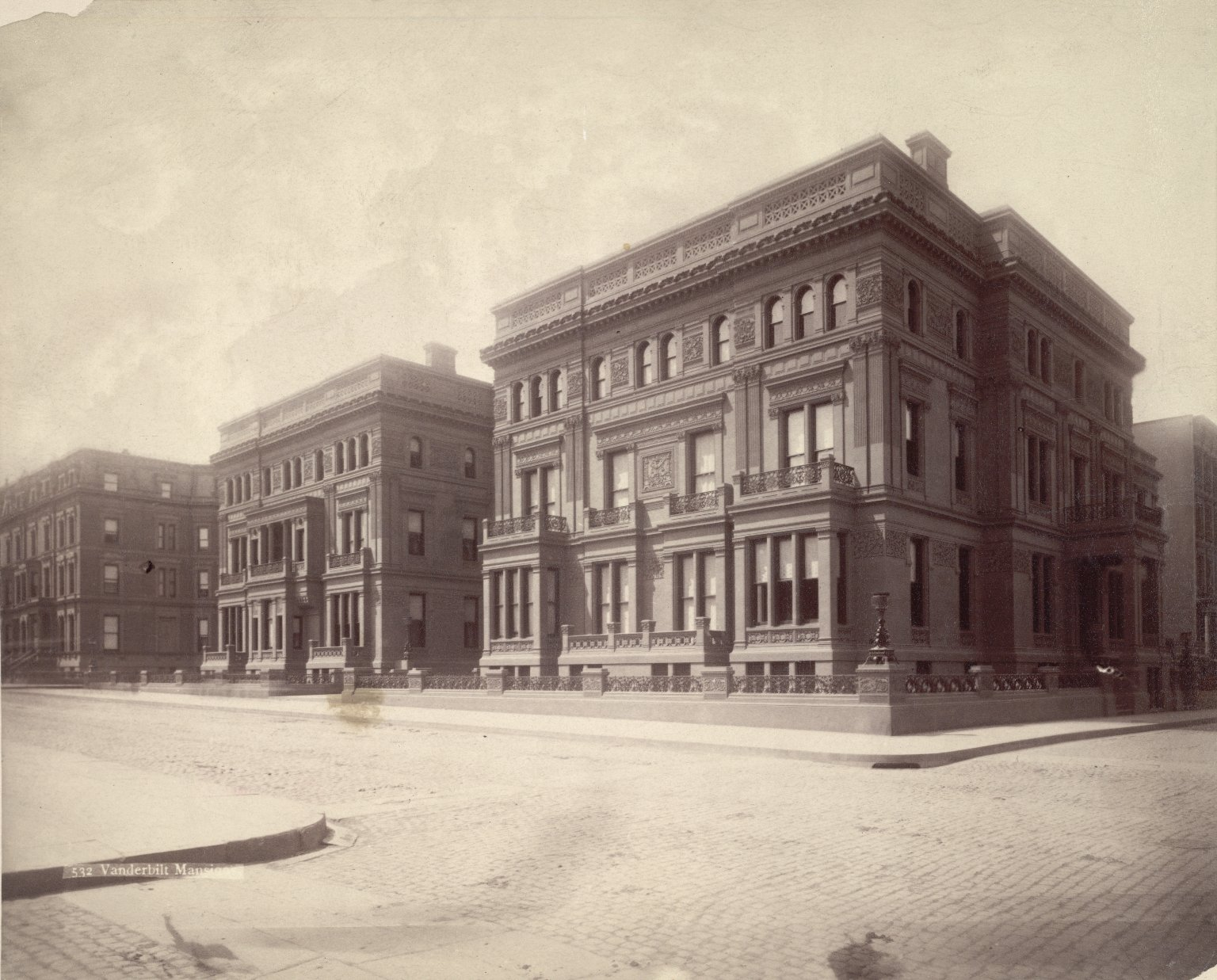
The Shepards' New York City townhouse (right), part of the Vanderbilt Triple Palace

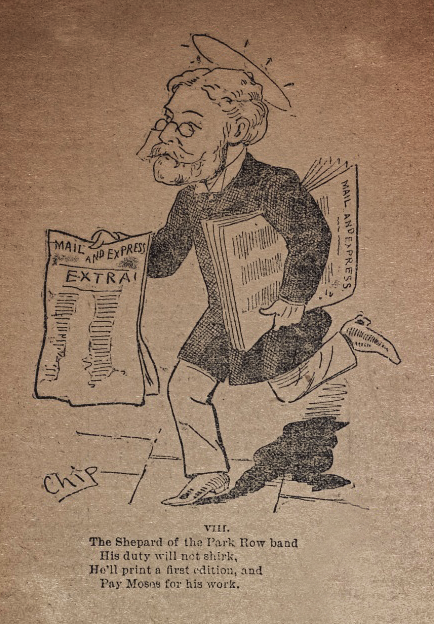
Political cartoon criticizing Shepard's Park Row newspaper

In 1864, Shepard was a member of the executive committee and chair of the Committee on Contributions from Without the City for the New York Metropolitan Fair. He chaired lawyers' committees for disaster relief, including those in Portland, Maine and Chicago after the 1866 Great Fire and the 1871 Great Chicago Fire respectively, and was a member of the municipal committee for victims of the 1889 Johnstown Flood.

In 1867 Shepard was presented to Margaret Louisa Vanderbilt at a reception given by Governor Morgan. Their difficult courtship was opposed by Margaret's father, William Henry Vanderbilt. A year later, on February 18, 1868, they were married in the Church of the Incarnation in New York City. After an 1868 trip to Tarsus, Mersin he helped found Tarsus American College, agreeing to donate $5,000 a year to the school and leave it an endowment of $100,000 ($3.58 million in 2025). He became one of the school's trustees and vice presidents.

In 1868, Shepard became a partner of Judge Theron R. Strong in Strong & Shepard, continuing the business after Strong's death. He continued to practice law for the next 25 years; he helped found the New York State Bar Association in 1876, and in 1884 was its fifth president. In 1875 Shepard drafted an amendment establishing an arbitration court for the New York Chamber of Commerce, serving on its five-member executive committee the following year. In 1880, the New York City Board of Aldermen appointed Shepard and Ebenezer B. Shafer to revise and codify the city's local ordinances to form the New-York Municipal Code; the last revision was in 1859.

During the 1880s he helped found three banks. At the Bank of the Metropolis, he was a founding board member. The others were the American Savings Bank and the Columbian National Bank, where he served as attorney. In 1881, US President Rutherford B. Hayes nominated him for United States Attorney for the Southern District of New York. In 1884, Shepard led the effort to create an arbitration court for the New York Chamber of Commerce. On March 20, 1888, Shepard purchased the Mail and Express newspaper (founded in 1836, with an estimated value in 1888 of $200,000 ($7.17 million in 2025) from Cyrus W. Field for $425,000 ($15.2 million in 2025). Deeply religious, Shepard placed a verse from the Bible at the head of each edition's editorial page. As president of the newspaper company until his death, he approved every important decision or policy. In the same year, Shepard became the controlling stockholder of the Fifth Avenue Transportation Company to force it to halt work on Sundays (the Christian Sabbath).

When Margaret's father died in 1885, she inherited $12 million ($430 million in 2025). The family lived at 2 West 52nd Street in Manhattan, one of three houses of the Vanderbilt Triple Palace which were built during the 1880s for William Henry Vanderbilt and his two daughters. After Elliott's death Margaret transferred the house to her sister's family, who combined their two houses into one. The houses were eventually demolished; the nine-story De Pinna Building was built there in 1928 and was demolished around 1969. 650 Fifth Avenue is the building currently on the site.

Shepard and his family toured the world in 1884, visiting Asia, Africa, and Europe. He documented his 1887 trip from New York to Alaska in The Riva.: New York and Alaska taken by himself, his wife and daughter, six other family members, their maid, a chef, butler, porter and conductor. According to Shepard, the family traveled 14,085 miles (22,668 km) on 26 railroads and stayed at 38 hotels in nearly five months. After the 1884 trip, aware of the opportunity for church work in the territory, he founded a mission and maintained it with his wife for about $20,000 ($716,700 in 2025) a year. For some time Shepard worshiped at the Fifth Avenue Presbyterian Church under John Hall, and was a vice president of the Presbyterian Union of New-York. Shepard was president of the American Sabbath Union for five years, and he also served as the chairman of the Special Committee on Sabbath Observance.

=== Briarcliff Manor developments ===
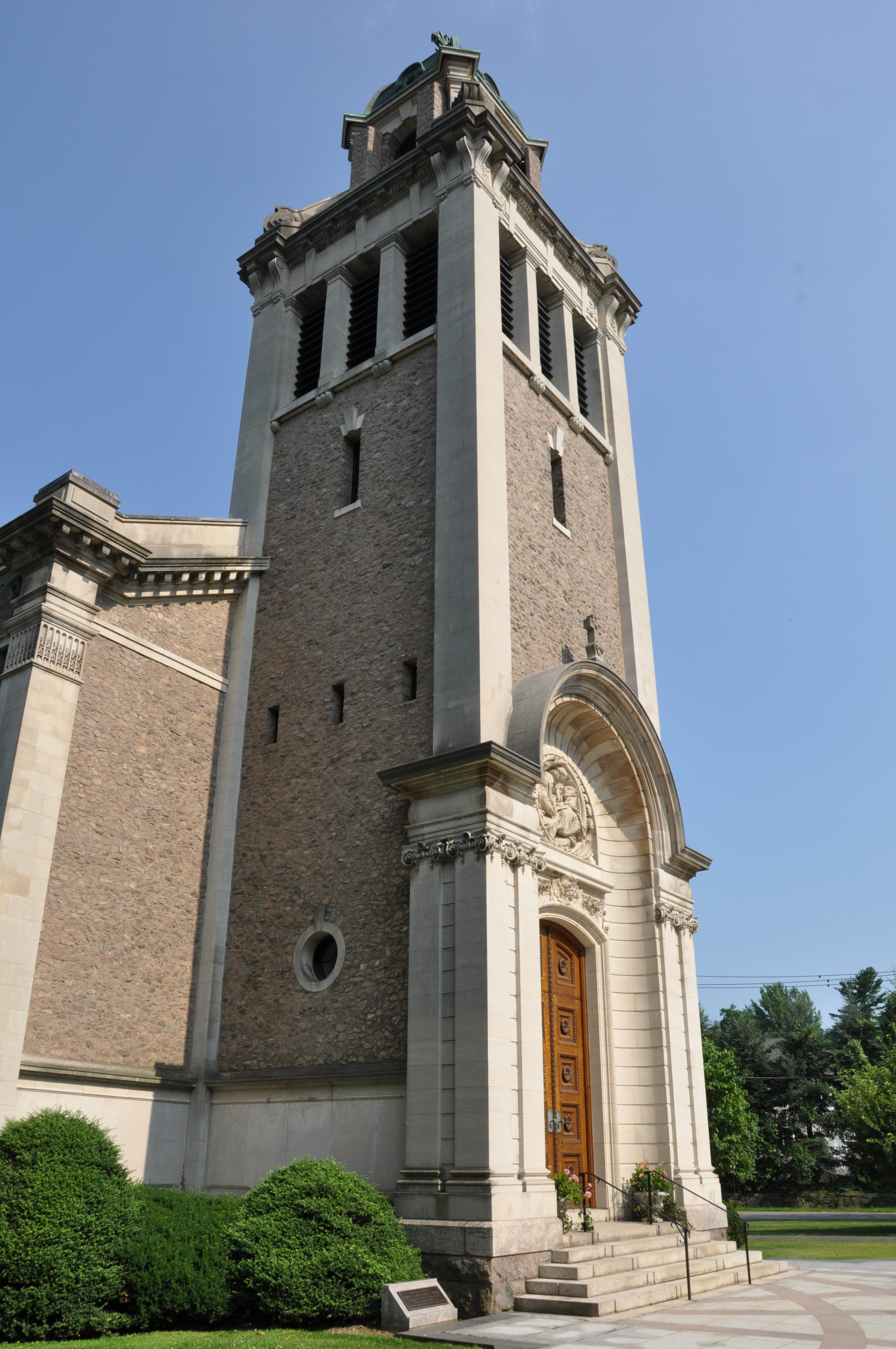
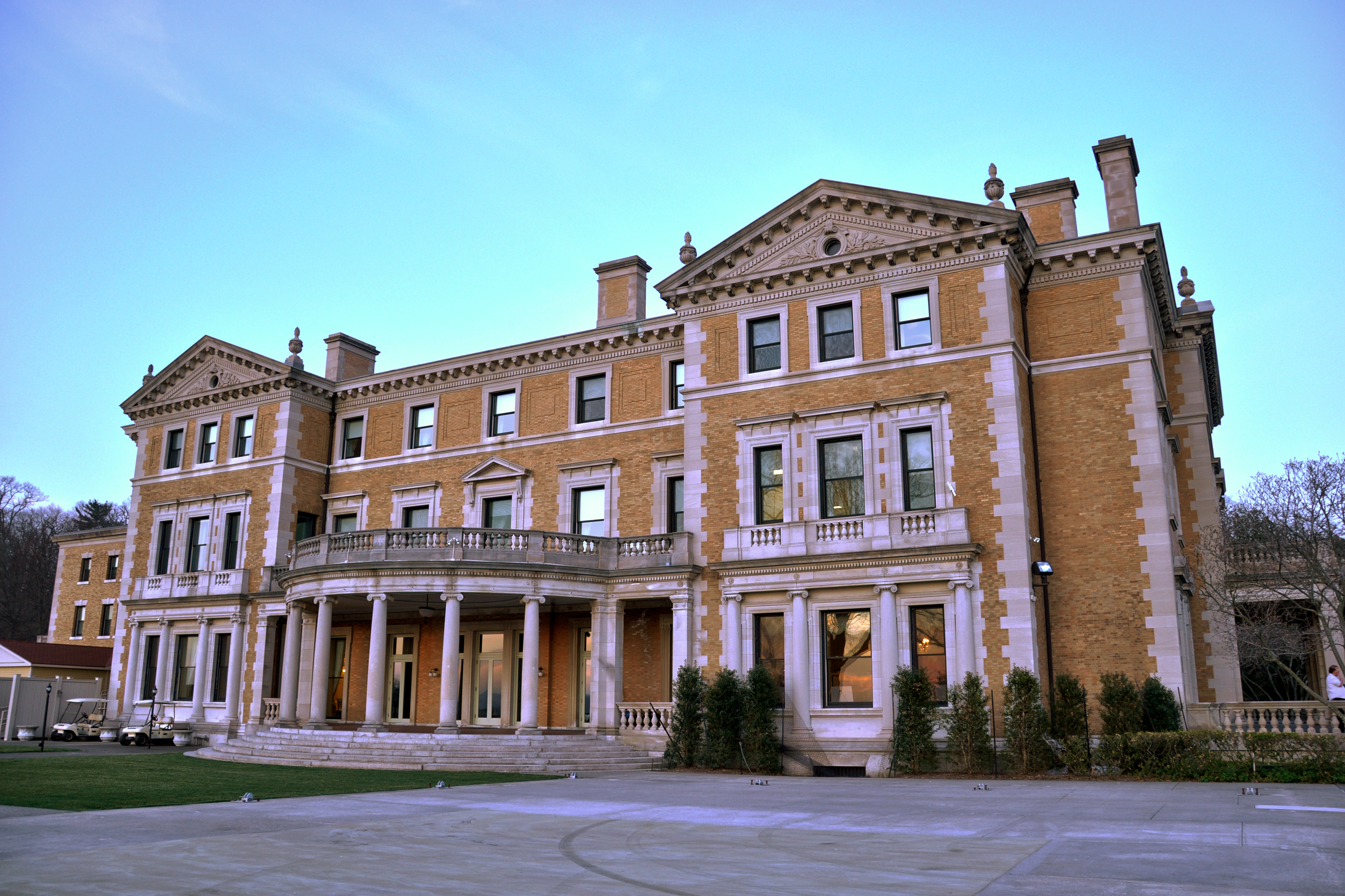
Shepard's Scarborough Presbyterian Church (left) and Woodlea, his Briarcliff Manor residence

During the early 1890s Shepard moved to Scarborough-on-Hudson in present-day Briarcliff Manor, purchasing a Victorian house from J. Butler Wright. He had a mansion (named Woodlea, after Wright's house) built south of the house, facing the Hudson River, and improved its grounds. Construction of the mansion began in 1892, and was completed three years later. Shepard died in 1893, leaving Margaret to oversee its completion. The finished house has between 65,000 and 70,000 square feet (6,000 and 6,500 m^{2}), making it one of the largest privately owned houses in the United States.

After Shepard's death Margaret lived there in the spring and fall, with her visits becoming less frequent. By 1900 she began selling property to Frank A. Vanderlip and William Rockefeller, selling them the house in 1910. Vanderlip and Rockefeller assembled a board of directors to create a country club; they first met at Vanderlip's National City Bank Building office at 55 Wall Street (Vanderlip was president of the bank at the time). Sleepy Hollow Country Club was founded, with Woodlea becoming its clubhouse and the J. Butler Wright house as its golf house.

Shepard established a small chapel on his Briarcliff Manor property, and founded the Scarborough Presbyterian Church in 1892. The church and its manse were donated by Margaret after his death. It was designed by Augustus Haydel (a nephew of Stanford White) and August D. Shepard Jr. (a nephew of Elliott Shepard and William Rutherford Mead). The church, dedicated on May 11, 1895, in Shepard's memory, was briefly known as Shepard Memorial Church.

== Family and personal life ==
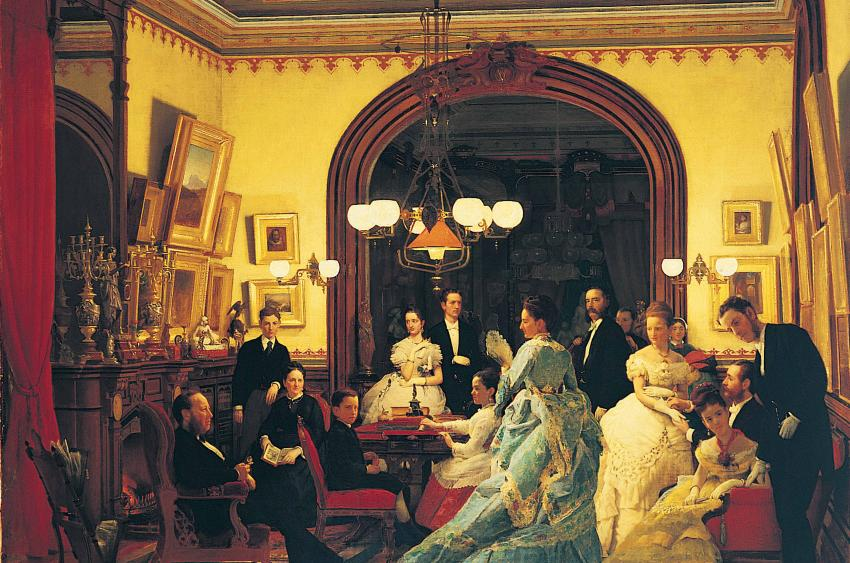
Going to the Opera (1874) by Seymour Joseph Guy, depicting the Vanderbilt family; Margaret is in blue, with Elliott on her right.

Shepard and Margaret had five daughters and one son: Florence (1869–1869), Maria Louise (1870–1948), Edith (1872–1954), Margaret (1873–1895), Alice (1874–1950) and Elliott Jr. (1876–1927). The children attended Sunday school and church, and were educated by private tutors and governesses. Shepard also employed a private chef for his family. Shepard was a strict father known to beat his son, who was described as being as wild as his father was rigid and moralizing.

Shepard was tall, with a pleasant expression and manner, and The New York Times called him the "perfect type of well-bred clubman". He had thick hair, manicured nails, a well-trimmed beard and an athletic figure. An opponent of antisemitism, he attended dinners publicizing the plight of Russian Jews and regularly addressed Jewish religious and social organizations avoided by others. He rented pews in many New York churches, supported about a dozen missionaries and was described as a generous donor to hospitals and charitable societies. Shepard was politically ambitious, and decided to build Woodlea as a symbol of power and influence. Shepard had horses and carriages which were ridden by the family in parks, and he prided himself on his equestrianism. Shepard was a long-time friend of US Senator Chauncey Depew.

Shepard was a supporter of the Republican Party, contributing $75,000 ($2.69 million in 2025) to the 1888 Presidential campaign fund and $10,000 ($358,300 in 2025) to the state committee for the Fassett campaign. He furnished Shepard Hall, at Sixth Avenue and 57th Street in New York City, offering it rent-free to the Republican Club.

Shepard belonged to a number of organizations: the Adirondack League, the American Museum of Natural History, the American Oriental Society, the Association of the Bar of the City of New York, the Century Association, the Congregational Club, the Lawyers' Club of New York, the Manhattan Athletic Club, the Metropolitan Museum of Art, the National Academy of Design, the New England Society of New York, the New York Athletic Club, the New York Press Club, the New York State Bar Association, the New York Yacht Club, the Presbyterian Union of New York, the Republican Club of the City of New York, the Riding Club, the Sons of the American Revolution, the Twilight Club, the Union League Club of New York, and the Union League of Brooklyn.

== Later life, death, and legacy ==
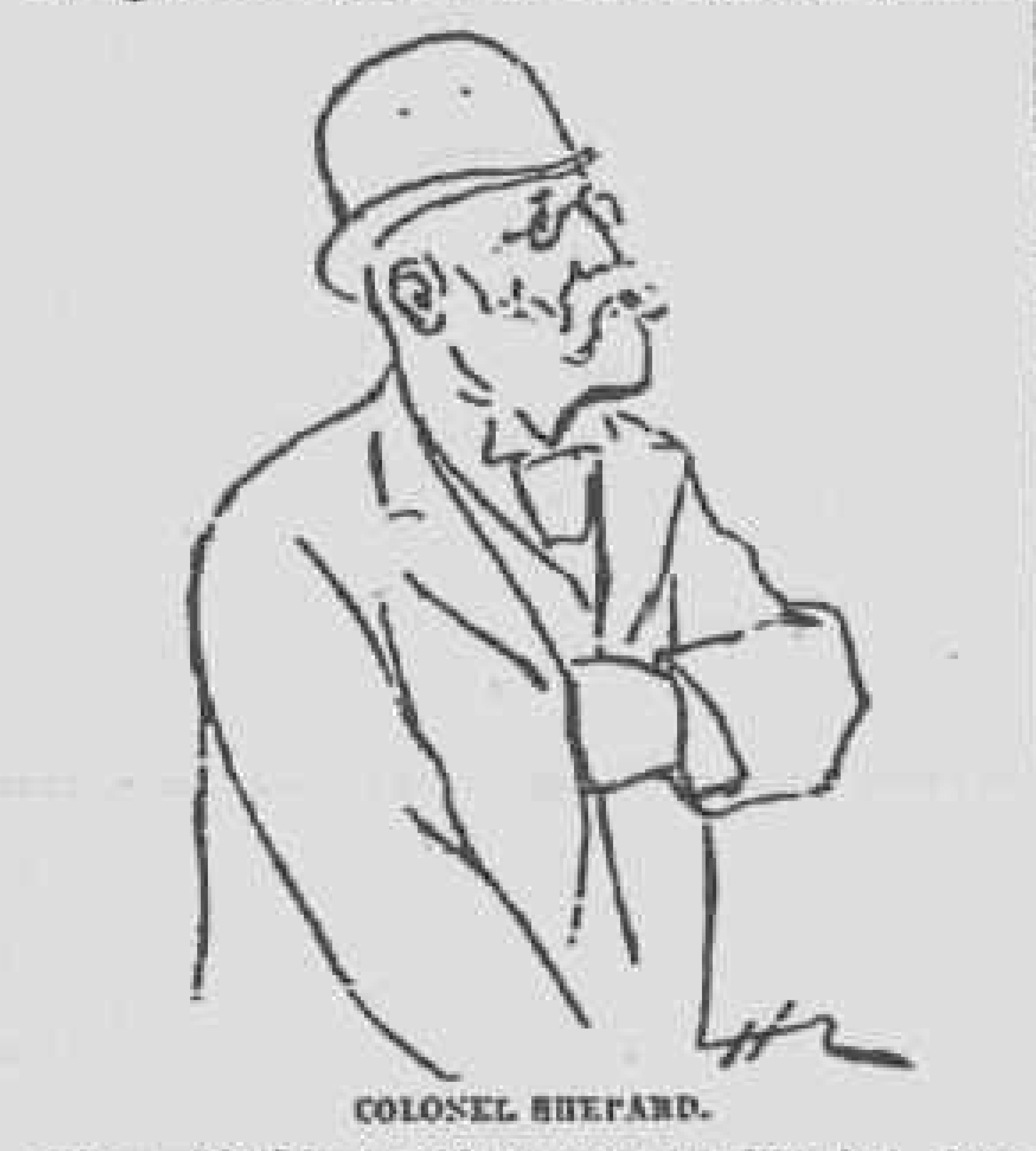
1892 sketch of Shepard

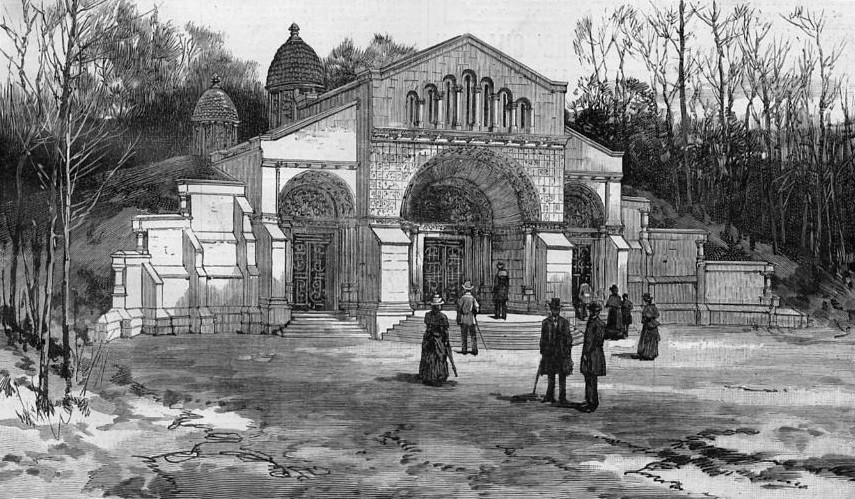
The Vanderbilt mausoleum, Shepard's initial resting place

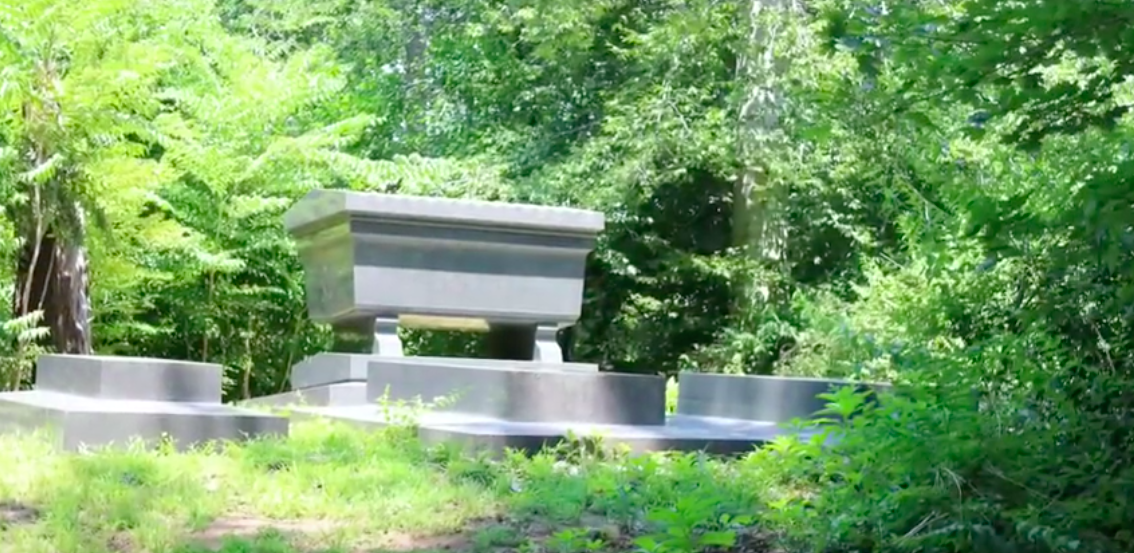
The Shepard family graves in the Vanderbilt family plot

In 1892, the City University of New York gave Shepard a Master of Laws degree and the University of Omaha gave him a Doctor of Laws degree. On January 11, 1893, Shepard addressed the House Committee on the Columbian Exposition in an effort to convince the committee not to open the exposition on a Sunday - the Sabbath. Shepard himself attended, having spent $25,000 ($895,833 in 2025) on September 7, 1891, in reserving sixteen rooms with board at the Auditorium Hotel for six months during the fair.

Shepard died unexpectedly during the afternoon of March 24, 1893, at his Manhattan residence. Two doctors were attempting to remove a bladder stone from him. They instructed him to eat lightly, only well before the operation. They gave him the anesthetic ether at 12:45 p.m. For a few minutes Shepard did not seem to react, though soon afterward his color started changing and his respiration and pulse dimmed, so administration of ether was stopped, however not enough ether was given to continue with the operation. His condition started to worsen again; the doctors suspected food or vomit was blocking his windpipe or bronchial tubes. The doctors then administered oxygen, which helped temporarily; however, at 4:00 p.m. his pulse became steadily more feeble, he fell unconscious, and died at 4:10 p.m. His cause of death was edema and congestion of the lungs, after the administration of ether, but due to an unknown cause.

Many doctors considered the case to be unusual and debated the cause of death. Some, including family members, accused them of criminal negligence; that Shepard was fed well before the operation, which could have allowed him to choke on vomit. No autopsy was made, but an inquest was made by the coroner. The two doctors to perform the operation made a statement on March 28, 1893, that after prior examinations no diseases were found and his heart and lungs seemed healthy. A Tribune reporter met doctor William J. Morton, son of possible ether discoverer William T. G. Morton who had first used it in 1846. Morton said it was most improbable Shepard died of ether, ensuring its safety when properly used, and that deaths were one in 25,000. He recommended an autopsy.

The first funeral service was a small gathering of pallbearers and close friends of the family at the house; then Shepard's body was moved to their church. From the Fifth Avenue Presbyterian Church, Shepard was moved to the Battery and then onto a ferry to Staten Island.

At the funeral, organizations that Shepard was part of sent representatives, including the Union League Club, the Republican County Committee, the Republican Club, the New York State Bar Association, the Presbyterian Union, the Chamber of Commerce, the American Sabbath Union, New York Sabbath Observance Committee, American Bible Society, St. Paul's Institute at Tarsus, the Union League of Brooklyn, the Republican Association of the 21st Assembly District, the Shepard Rifles, the New York Typothetae, the American Bank Note Company, the College of the City of New York, the Mail and Express, and the New-York Press Club. Those at the funeral included Albert Bierstadt, Noah Davis, Chauncey M. Depew, John S. Kennedy, John James McCook, Warner Miller, John Sloane, and John H. Starin. Notable family included his immediate family, as well as most of the living Vanderbilt family, including the majority of Margaret Louisa's siblings, their spouses, and Margaret Louisa's mother.

Shepard was first buried in the Vanderbilt mausoleum in Moravian Cemetery. On November 17, 1894, one of his daughters, his wife, and her brother George Vanderbilt oversaw the transfer of his remains and those of his daughter Florence to a new Shepard family tomb in the cemetery nearby.

Shepard's estate included the $100,000 Tarsus American College endowment, $850,000 in real estate and $500,000 in personal property for a total of $1.35 million ($48.4 million in 2025). His will distributed money and property to his wife and children, his brother Augustus, and religious organizations. Shepard funded a number of scholarships and prizes, including one at the City University of New York and New York University's annual Elliott F. Shepard Scholarship, and in 1888 he donated a large collection of books originally from lawyer Aaron J. Vanderpoel's library to the New York University School of Law. A year later, Shepard created an endowment for periodicals, necessitating the creation of the university's first reading room. In 1897, Shepard's wife donated his 1,390-volume collection of law books to the library.

When the wife of Chicago publisher Horace O'Donoghue read him the news of Shepard's death four days after the event, he picked up a razor and slit his throat. Although his suicide was first thought to be an impulsive reaction, it was later learned that the likely cause was O'Donoghue's large debts to Chicago publishing houses.

== Selected works ==
- Shepard, Elliott Fitch; Shafer, Ebenezer B. (1881). Ordinances of the Mayor, Aldermen and Commonalty of the City of New York: In Force January 1, 1881. New York: Martin B. Brown. OCLC 680539530.
- Shepard, Elliott Fitch (1886). Labor and Capital Are One. New York: American Bank Note Company. OCLC 43539083.
