= Elliott Shepard =

American racing driver (1876–1927)

Elliott Fitch Shepard Jr.
- Born: October 13, 1876; New York City, New York, U.S.
- Died: August 10, 1927 (aged 50); Miami, Florida, U.S.
- Education: Westminster School; Yale University
- Alma mater: Harvard University
- Spouses: Esther Potter (m. 1897; div. 1902) Eleanor Leigh Terradell (after 1902)
- Parent(s): Elliott Fitch Shepard; Margaret Louisa Vanderbilt
- Relatives: See Vanderbilt family

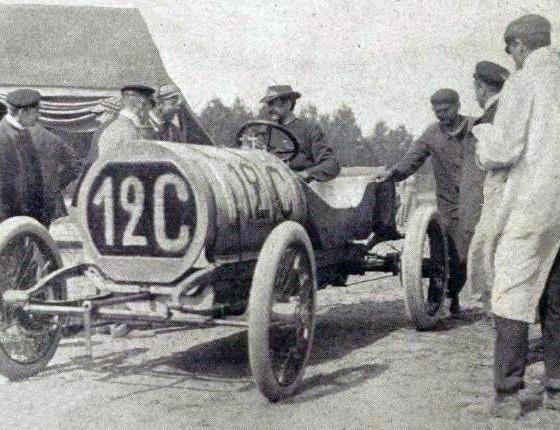
1906 ACF Grand Prix, Elliot Fitch Shepard Junior, American billionaire, starting on Hotchkiss HH.

Elliott Fitch Shepard Jr. (October 13, 1876 – April 10, 1927) was an American racing driver, who competed in several early motor races. In World War I, he volunteered to treat the wounded, and was awarded the Knight of the Legion de Honneur, the Croix de Guerre and the American Field Service Medal.

== Early life ==
Shepard was born in New York City on October 13, 1876. His parents were Elliott Fitch Shepard (1833–1893), a prominent lawyer and banker, and Margaret Louisa Vanderbilt Shepard (1845–1924), eldest daughter of William Henry Vanderbilt and Maria Louisa Kissam.

Shepard was educated at Westminster School in Simsbury, Connecticut, and started at Yale University in 1895. In 1896, he was almost expelled in his freshman year for bringing three drunk women to his dormitory. He stated that he didn't want to abandon the women, who became ill, and that they were allowed entrance to his dormitory based on that. He resigned from the school the following day. He later studied at Harvard University.

== Career ==
Following his divorce in 1902, Shepard again returned to Paris, living at 244 rue de Rivoli. He made several more attempts as opening businesses, all of which were again unsuccessful.

On April 27, 1905, Shepard knocked down and killed a 12-year-old girl, Madeline Marduel. A trial followed, and on October 26 the judge sentenced Shepard to three months imprisonment, a fine of US$120 (equivalent to $4,300 in 2025) and he was ordered to pay for damages of $4,000 (equivalent to $143,000 in 2025) to the girl's parents. Shepard appealed the decision, and the case was eventually settled in January 1907, with a reduced sentence of six weeks imprisonment. After nine days in Fresnes Prison, Shepard was pardoned after paying a further $2,000 (equivalent to $69,000 in 2025).

=== Racing ===
In the 1906 Vanderbilt Cup, a race started in 1904 by his cousin, William Kissam Vanderbilt II, Shepard lost control of his Hotchkiss HH car and hit two spectators who were killed in the incident.

In 1907, Shepard was injured when he drove into a river in Monte Chiarl after a tire on his car became detached and sent the car bouncing over the bridge railing moving a further five yards into the river. He broke his collarbone with other slight injuries to his body.

=== World War I ===
During World War I, Shepard worked in a hospital for American volunteers for the French army in Chantilly, France. His work helped him to receive the Knight of the Legion de Honneur, the Croix de Guerre and the American Field Service Medal. He gave up his estate in Chantilly for those sick or wounded in the American Field Service. He served as president of the organization and chairman of its Paris Branch.

== Personal life ==
On April 10, 1897, Shepard married Esther Potter, a 25-year-old widow, in a civic marriage. A religious ceremony followed at the insistence of Shepard's mother, after which the newlyweds left for Europe. Shepard went into business in Paris, but was unsuccessful. He briefly returned to the US with his wife, but they separated and in August 1902, she filed for absolute divorce.

Shepard later married Eleanor Leigh Terradell (1882–1962), daughter of Thomas Terradell. Her sister, Mercedes Terradell was married to Prof. Jean Labatut in 1929. During the War, they turned their home in Chantilly, France into a convalescence hospital.

Shepard died on April 10, 1927, at his Miami beach estate, after a long illness.
