= John Albert Morris =

American businessman (1836–1895)

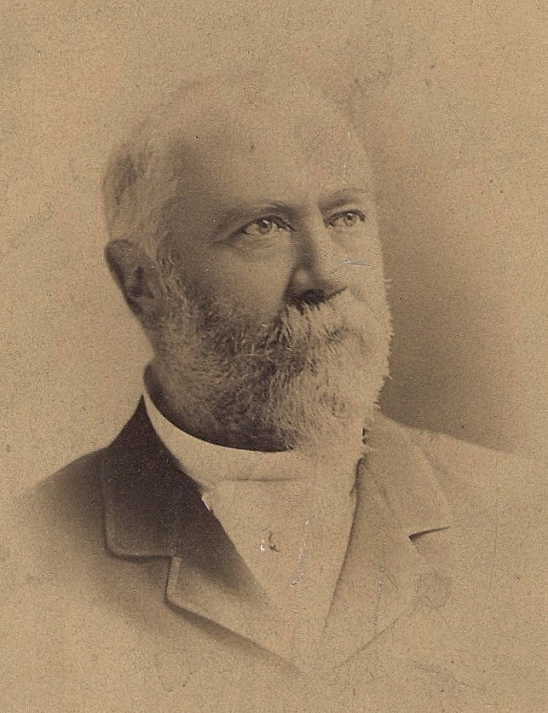
- Born: July 29, 1836; Jersey City, New Jersey, [U.S.
- Died: May 25, 1895 (aged 58); Kerrville, Texas, U.S.
- Resting place: Metairie Cemetery, New Orleans
- Occupations: Businessman, Lottery operator, Racetrack owner, Racehorse owner/breeder
- Board member of: Louisiana State Lottery Company, Morris Park Racecourse
- Spouse: Cora Hennen (m. 1857)
- Children: Francis Morris, Alfred Hennen, Dave Hennen, Isabel Morris-Ledyard
- Parent(s): Francis Morris; Mary Elizabeth Valentine
- Honors: Morris Park, Bronx; John A. Morris Handicap at Saratoga Race Course

John Albert Morris (July 29, 1836 – May 25, 1895) was an American businessman widely known as the "Lottery King" and a prominent figure in the sport of thoroughbred horse racing. A native of New Jersey, he benefited from a large inheritance and added substantially to his fortune through a majority interest in the Louisiana State Lottery Company.

== Early life ==
Morris was born in Jersey City, New Jersey, on July 29, 1836. He was the son of Francis Morris and Mary Elizabeth Valentine. As a boy, he traveled to England, under the charge of Richard Ten Broeck, when he put Prior and other horses on the English turf.

== Thoroughbred racing ==
His father was also involved in horse racing, and notably owned Ruthless, the winner of the 1867 Belmont and Travers Stakes. Morris inherited his father's 25,000-acre (100 km^{2}) ranch in Gillespie County, Texas, fourteen miles (23 km) from the town of Kerrville, where he established a horse breeding operation.

John Morris owned a large racing stable in the United States and another in Europe. With Leonard W. Jerome as his minority partner, in 1889 he opened Morris Park Racecourse in what was then Westchester County, New York. The racetrack hosted the Belmont Stakes from 1890 through 1904 as well as the Preakness Stakes in 1890. A few days before he died in May 1895, he leased the racecourse, with an option to purchase, to the Westchester Racing Association.

=== Properties ===
At one point in time, Morris owned nine "superbly equipped establishments in America and Europe," including in New Orleans, Louisiana, Throggs Neck, New York, three properties in Boston, Massachusetts, Bar Harbor, Maine, Gillespie County, Texas, and in Hanover, Germany. The Morris heirs later sold the property to real estate developers in 1905.

== Personal life ==
In 1857, he married Cora Hennen, the daughter of Alfred Hennen, a wealthy and prominent judge in New Orleans. The couple had four children:

- Francis Morris (c. 1864–1880)
- Alfred Hennen Morris (1864–1959), a vice-chairman and steward of The Jockey Club
- Dave Hennen Morris (1872–1944), lawyer, diplomat, Ambassador to Belgium, and co-founder of the International Auxiliary Language Association
- Frances Isabel Morris, who first married Thurlow Weed Barnes, brother of photographer Catharine Weed Barnes and grandson of publisher Thurlow Weed. After their divorce, she married Lewis Cass Ledyard (1851–1932), a grandson of Lewis Cass, governor of the Michigan Territory and a United States senator.

John Albert Morris suffered a stroke and died, at age 59, in 1895 while at his Texas Ranch. His remains were sent by train to New Orleans where he was interred in the Metairie Cemetery.

At the time of his death, his wealth was estimated at between $25,000,000 and $30,000,000.

=== Legacy ===
The neighborhood of Morris Park in the Bronx, New York, a large part of which covers the site of Morris Park Racecourse, is named in his memory.
