= New York Evening Mail =

Daily newspaper in New York City (1867–1924)

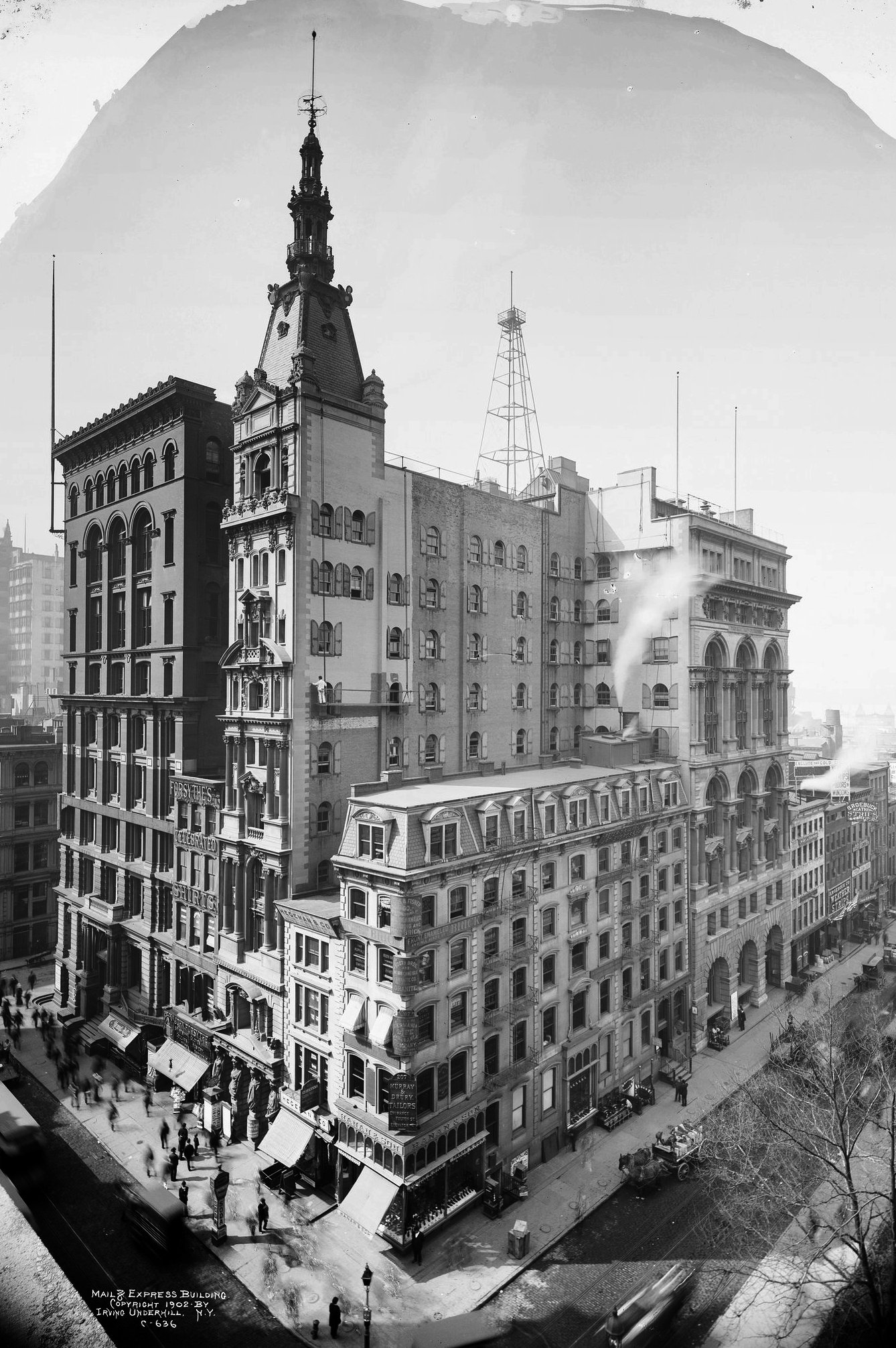
- The Mail and Express building (1892–1920, center, with spire)
- Type: Daily newspaper
- Owner: Charles H. Sweetser
- Publisher: Evening Mail Association (1869–1870)
- Editor: Charles H. Sweetser
- Founded: 1867
- Headquarters: New York City, U.S.

The New York Evening Mail (1867–1924) was an American daily newspaper published in New York City. For a time the paper was the only evening newspaper to have a franchise in the Associated Press.

== History ==
=== Names ===
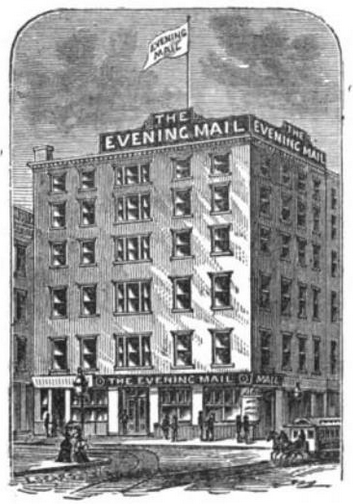
New York Evening Mail at 34 Park Row in 1872, the former site of Lovejoy's Hotel

The paper was founded as the New York Evening Mail in 1867 and published under that name through 1877. It then went through some minor name changes, becoming the New York Mail for about a year (November 1877 – November 1878), and then The Mail (through late 1879). It then became the Evening Mail from 1879 through December 1881, when owner Cyrus West Field (1819–1892) acquired the New York Evening Express (which had been founded by James (1810–1873) and Erastus Brooks (1815–1886) as a Whig paper in June 1836), and created The Mail and Express. It retained the Mail and Express moniker until 1904, when it eventually became the Evening Mail once again. In 1915 the newspaper was acquired by Edward Rumely with financing from a source in Germany. Rumely felt that most American newspapers were taking a pro-British side threatening neutrality.

In January 1924, the paper was merged with the Evening Telegram upon being acquired by Frank Munsey from Henry Luther Stoddard (1862–1947). This later became the New York World-Telegram in 1931.

=== Early history ===
On March 20, 1888, Elliott Fitch Shepard purchased the Mail and Express (with an estimated value of $200,000 ($7.17 million in 2025) from Cyrus West Field for $425,000 ($15.2 million in 2025). Deeply religious, Shepard placed a verse from the Bible at the head of each edition's editorial page. As president of the newspaper company until his death, he approved every important decision or policy. Shepard's brother Augustus Dennis Shepard (1836–1913), who was the vice president, became acting president of the Mail and Express Company on his brother's death.

=== Mail and Express building ===
In 1892, the newspaper's owner Elliott Fitch Shepard ordered a new headquarters built. Shepard owned the company from 1888 until his death in 1893. The building was on Broadway, between Fulton and Dey Streets. It was 66 by 25 by 211 feet, ten stories, and was built by Carrère & Hastings (architects of the New York Public Library). The building's dimensions were challenging based on the land purchased, and thus the Buffalo Morning Express wrote that it "looks for all the world like an upright lead pencil". The ground floor featured caryatids representing the newspaper's reach across all "four corners of the world". The building became an architectural landmark, such that after a fire in 1900, the Troy Daily Times wrote that it was "such an ornament to Broadway that its destruction would be a calamity". It was demolished in 1920, following AT&T's plans to expand its building at 195 Broadway to take over nearly the entire block.

In 1907, Rube Goldberg moved to New York, finding employment as a cartoonist with the New York Evening Mail. The New York Evening Mail was syndicated to the first newspaper syndicate, the McClure Newspaper Syndicate, giving Goldberg's cartoons a wider distribution, and by 1915 he was earning $25,000 per year and being billed by the paper as America's most popular cartoonist. Arthur Brisbane had offered Goldberg $2,600 per year in 1911 in an unsuccessful attempt to get him to move to William Randolph Hearst's newspaper chain, and in 1915 raised the offer to $50,000 per year. Rather than lose Goldberg to Hearst, the New York Evening Mail matched the salary offer and formed the Evening Mail Syndicate to syndicate Goldberg's cartoons nationally.

=== World War I controversy ===
The New York Times of July 9, 1918, reported that Edward Rumely, "... vice president, secretary and publisher of the New York Evening Mail, was arrested late yesterday afternoon by agents of the Government, charged with perjury. The charge grew out of a statement filed with A. Mitchell Palmer, the Alien Property Custodian, in which Rumely asserted that The Evening Mail was an American-owned newspaper. The Government is in possession of evidence which, it is held, shows that instead of being owned by Americans, the paper is in fact owned by the Imperial German Government, which on June 1, 1915, paid to Rumely, through Walter Lyon, of the former Wall Street house of Renskorf. Lyon & Co., the sum of $735,000, which transferred the control of the newspaper to the Kaiser."

In July 1918 Rumely was arrested and convicted of violation of the Trading with the Enemy Act. Rumely however denied the allegations, claiming, instead, he had received money to buy the paper from an American citizen in Germany. He had failed to report this when he received the money. He said the charge was baseless, and based on perjured testimony. President Coolidge granted him a presidential pardon in 1925.

== Staff ==
- Rheta Childe Dorr
- Rube Goldberg
- H.L. Mencken
- William Charles Morris (1874–1940), political cartoonist
- Roderic C. Penfield
- Harry J. Tuthill

== Publication and bibliographic history ==
The following table summarizes the newspaper's successive titles and publication runs as recorded in Library of Congress catalog records (LCCN).

LCCN	Date range	Publication name	Start (vol./no./date)	End (vol./no./date)
sn83030190.	1867–1877	The New York Evening Mail	Vol. 1, no. 1 (September 21, 1867)	Vol. 20, no. 3326 (November 23, 1877)
sn88073042.	1877–1878	The New York Mail	Vol. 1, no. 1 (November 24, 1877)	Vol. 20, no. 3356 (December 31, 1877)
sn83030191.	1878–1879	The Mail	Vol. 22, no. 3473 (July 3, 1878)	Vol. 24, no. 3862 (October 10, 1879)
sn88073043.	1879–1881	The Evening Mail	Vol. 24, no. 3863 (October 11, 1879)	Vol. 28, no. 4524 (December 3, 1881)
sn83030188.	1881–1904	The Mail and Express	Vol. 28, no. 4525 (December 5, 1881)	Vol. 68, no. 38 (February 13, 1904)
sn88073044.	1904	The Evening Mail and Express	Vol. 68, no. 39 (February 15, 1904)	Vol. 68, no. 80 (April 2, 1904)
sn83030192.	1904–1924	The Evening Mail	Vol. 68, no. 81 (April 4, 1904)	Vol. 88, no. 22 (January 26, 1924)
sn87073021.	1924–1925	New York Telegram and Evening Mail	No. 29487 (January 28, 1924)	No. 29897 (May 16, 1925)

== People ==
=== 1935 retrospective ===
A 1935 retrospective by sports editor W.S. "Bill" Farnsworth in the New York Evening Journal observed that "most of the defunct Evening Mail staff are doing well," noting that the paper had served as a training ground for an unusually large number of prominent journalists, editors, and cultural figures. Among its alumni were Broadway producer Brock Pemberton; drama critic Burns Mantle (1873–1948); cartoonist Rube Goldberg (1883–1970); celebrated sportswriter Grantland Rice (né Henry Grantland Rice; 1880–1954); and playwright George S. Kaufman (1889–1961). The paper's sports pages were shaped by figures such as Francis Peter Albertanti (1889–1958), Fred Wenck (né Frederick August Wenck; 1879–1946) — later New York Boxing Commissioner under the Frawley Law — and Jake Karpf (né Jacob Jerome Karpf; 1872–1943), another sports editor, now on the sports staff of The American Magazine; Jimmy Sinnott (né James Philip Sinnott; 1891–1955), who, at the Evening Mail, had a column, "In Mid-Channel with Skipper Sinnott," was, from 1931 to 1933, the Fourth Deputy NYPD Commissioner under Mayor Walker.

Other former staff went on to influential careers in journalism and public life, including columnist F. P. A., (né Franklin Pierce Adams; 1881–1960) now a columnist; city editor George T. Hughes (né George Thomas Hughes; 1871–1945), who wrote financial news for the Evening World; Jack Pulaski (né Isma Berringer Pulaski; 1883–1948) now on Variety. W. W. Mills (né William Wirt Mills; 1867–1946), assistant city editor, went on to become Tax Commissioner for the Staten Island under Mayors "Red Mike" Hylan (né John Francis Hylan; 1868–1936), Jimmy Walker (né James John Walker; 1881–1946), and later, Tax Commissioner for the City of New York under Mayor Fiorello LaGuardia (1882–1947).

The Evening Mail also counted among its ranks playwrights Bayard Veiller (1869–1943) and Edward Hope (pseudonym of Edward Hope Coffee, Jr.; 1896–1958), sportswriters Roy Moulton (né Roy Kenneth Moulton; 1876–1928) and Hughey Fullerton (né Hugh Stuart Fullerton III; 1873–1945), and future television personality Ed Sullivan; Roy Moulton (né Roy Kenneth Moulton; 1876–1928), Hughey Fullerton (né Hugh Stuart Fullerton III; 1873–1945), Ed Sullivan, Harry Schumacher (né Harry Frick Schumacher; 1886–1958), Ed Van Every (né Edward Moses Van Evera; 1879–1952), Berton Braley (1882–1966), W. W. Williams (né Willard Wells Williams; 1875–1948).

Even junior staff rose to prominence. Fred Winkelman (né Frederick Herman Winkelmann; 1895–1965), once a copy boy, became attached to the homicide squad of the New York Police Department, while another office boy, Henry H. Becker (1893–1964), later joined the financial staff of The American Magazine. Jack Anderson (né John Anderson; 1860–1940), formerly foreman of the composing room, still setting type, but for the Telegram.

The paper was edited and owned by Henry L. Stoddard (né Henry Luther Stoddard; 1862–1947), described in the 1935 article as "perhaps the closest newspaperman to Theodore Roosevelt."

There's also Jack Lawrence (né John Wheeler Lawrence; 1887–1962), (Note: Seabury Lawrence (1858–1922), was editor and publisher of the New York Daily Stockholder and for 25 years New York correspondent of Boston News Bureau, was the father of Seabury Lawrence, Jr. (1879–1928), of The New York Sun, and Jack Lawrence (né John Wheeler Lawrence; 1887–1962) of the New York Evening Mail and later, the New York Tribune. Jack's maternal grandfather, Andrew Carpenter Wheeler (1835–1903), was a newspaper writer and author. Jack was also a brother-in-law of the author, Francis William Sullivan (1887–1963). His step-grandmother was writer Jennie Pearl Mowbray Wheeler (1865–1952).) who "covered" ship news.

Those who have passed include Gym Bagley (pseudonym of James E. Bagley; c. 1858–1910; aka "Cross Right") and Tommy Tompkins (né Theodore LaBeaume Tompkins; 1861–1924).

== See also ==
Category: New York Evening Mail journalists

== Bibliography ==
=== References ===
- American Biographies – A Genealogical, Historical and Biographical Cyclopedia (3 Vols.). Compiled by the Editorial Press Bureau Incorporated. Washington, D.C. 1950. LCCN 51-372; OCLC 1192596 (all editions).
1. Vol 1: "Henry Luther Stoddard". pp. 234–236.
  1. Via HathiTrust (Ohio State).
- AMNH (June 2, 1874). Ceremonies at the Laying of the Corner Stone of the American Museum of Natural History. p. 20.
1. Via Wikimedia Commons (AMNH).
2. Via Internet Archive (AMNH).
- Editor & Publisher. Vol. 58, no. 31. James Wright Brown (1873–1959), publisher; Marlen Edwin Pew (1878–1936), ed. December 6, 1925. LCCN sf86-91701; ISSN 1943-7234 (online), ISSN 0013-094X (print); OCLC 9243796 (all editions).
1. "Death Suddenly Summons Frank Munsey at Height of Power and Success — Succumbs at 71 After 9-Day Battle with Appendicitis – Newspapers Temporarily in Charge of William T. Dewart – Wealth Estimated at $40,000,000". pp. 3–4.
2. "Frank Munsey Lives in Many Memories — Tributes from Government Officials and Publishers of the Nation Stress His Integrity, Self-Reliance, Sagacity, and Ambition". pp. 5–6, 48.
3. "Yankee Lad's Grim Climb up Golden Ladder". pp. 7–8.
4. "Editorial: Frank A. Munsey". p. 28.
  1. Via Wikimedia Commons. (download)'' (PDF). (read online).
  2. Via Internet Archive.
- Federal Reserve Bank of Minneapolis. "Consumer Price Index, 1800 – [present]". Historic data including estimates before the modern U.S. Consumer Price Index (CPI).
- Fourth Estate (The) (November 4, 1916). "Evening Mail in its New Home – Now Occupies Six Floors and Basement of the Lupton Building". No. 1184. Ernest Fitzyale Birmingham (1860–1936), publisher. p. 10 – via Google Books.
- Homans, James Edward, ed. (1918). The Cyclopædia of American Biography (Michigan). Vol. 8. The Press Association Compilers: D. Appleton & Company. pp. 299–300.
- Hudson, Frederic (1873). Journalism in the United States from 1690 to 1872. pp. 517–520.
1. Via Internet Archive (Robarts Library).
2. Via Google Books (UC Davis).
- Illustrated American (The) (April 8, 1893). "Col. Elliott F. Shepard". Vol. 13, no. 164. Chicago. p. 427 – via Google Books (Michigan).
- Library of Congress. The New York Mail (New York N.Y.) 1877–1878. LCCN sn88-73042.
- Marzio, Peter Cort (1943–2010) (1973). Rube Goldberg: His Life and Work. Harper and Row. LCCN 73-4108; ISBN 978-0-0601-2830-2, 0-0601-2830-5; OCLC 632345 (all editions).
1. Via Internet Archive (Hicksville Public Library).
- McCusker, John J. II. How Much Is That in Real Money? – A Historical Price Index for Use as a Deflator of Money Values in the Economy of the United States. Worcester, Massachusetts: American Antiquarian Society. Retrieved February 29, 2024.
1. 1992 ed. "Table A-2: Consumer Price Index, United States: 1700–1991" (2nd printing). pp. 323–332. ISBN 978-0-9440-2633-5, 0-9440-2633-8 (paperback); OCLC 26089551 (all editions).
  1. Via Internet Archive (University of Jamestown).
  2. Via American Antiquarian Society (PDF).
2. 1997 ed. "Table A-2, Revised": "Consumer Price Index, United States: 1634–1699". pp. 332–333. ISBN 978-0-9440-2678-6, 0-9440-2678-8 (paperback); OCLC 53347080 (all editions).
  1. Via American Antiquarian Society (PDF).
3. 2001 ed (2nd ed.). LCCN 2001-22075; ISBN 978-1-9295-4501-8, 1-9295-4501-0 (paperback).
  1. Via Internet Archive (St. Louis Community College, withdrawn).
- New York Court of Appeals (1900). "In the Matter of the Application of Alexander B. Larkin for a Writ of Mandamus". Albany. pp. 15, 27 – via Google Books.

See Writ of mandamus.

- New York Evening Journal.
1. Farnsworth, Wilton Simpson "Bill" (1885–1945) (February 16, 1935). "Sidewalks of New York" → "Most of the defunct Evening Mail staff are doing well ..." (No. 17380). p. 19.
  1. Via GenealogyBank.
- New York Times (The). LCCN sn00-61556; ISSN 0362-4331, ISSN 1553-8095 (online).
1. "Elliott F. Shepard Dead — He Expires at His Home After Taking Ether".
  "Had Given No Indication of Serious Illness".
  "But Evidently Had the Possibility of Death in Mind".
  "His Family at His Bedside".
  "A Peculiarly Eccentric Character".
  "Politician, Editor, and Religious Enthusiast".
  "Often Amusing, but Always in Earnest"
  . Vol. 42, no. 12975. March 25, 1893. p. 1 (column 7). Retrieved August 5, 2014.
  1. Via NYTimes blog.
  2. Via TimesMachine.
  3. Pdf via TimesMachine (PDF).
  4. Permalink via TimesMachine.
  5. Via ProQuest 95067214 (Historical Newspapers database).
  6. Newspapers.com.
2. Robert E. A. Dorr Dead — Was Editor and Publisher of the New York Mail and Express — Had Been Ill for Many Months, and the End Was Not Unexpected – His Probable Successor". Vol. 50, no. 15878. November 28, 1900. p. 9 (column 3). Retrieved July 14, 2025.
  1. Via NYTimes blog.
  2. Via TimesMachine.
  3. Pdf via TimesMachine (PDF).
  4. Permalink via TimesMachine.
  5. Via ProQuest 96022582 (Historical Newspapers database).
  6. Newspapers.com.
3. "Arrest Rumely; Say Germany Owns The Evening Mail – Government Charges Perjury in Statement That Paper Is Under American Control – $100,000 Bail Demanded – Kaiser's Government Alleged to Have Invested $1,361,000 in the Paper – Paid It Through Dr. Albert – Whose Memorandum Shows the Cost Was Charged to His and Bernstorff's Joint Bank Account". (1) "Bail of $100,000 Is Demanded". (2) "Say Germany Owns The Evening Mail". (3) "Explains Transfers of Money". (4) "Bought with War Bonds". (5) "Palmer Called for Report". (6) "Concealment of Transactions". (7) "Rumely Makes No Statement". Vol. 164, no. 56666. July 19, 1918. pp. 1 & 4. Retrieved September 21, 2012.
  1. Via NYTimes blog.
  2. Via TimesMachine.
  3. Pdf via TimesMachine (PDF).
  4. Permalink via TimesMachine.
  5. ProQuest 100208993 (Historical Newspapers database & ProQuest Digital Collections).
4. "F.A. Munsey Buys the Evening Mail – Will Consolidate It with the Evening Telegram Next Monday, He Announces – Reported Price $2,000,000 – New Owner, After Purchase of Nine Newspapers Here, Has Three Daily Publications". Vol. 73, 24107. January 25, 1924. p. 1. Retrieved July 18, 2012.
  1. Via NYTimes blog.
  2. Via TimesMachine.
  3. Pdf via TimesMachine (PDF).
  4. Permalink via TimesMachine.
  5. Via ProQuest 103312165 (Historical Newspapers database).
5. Gray, Christopher (October 26, 2014) [blog ed. October 24, 2014]. "Streetscapes": "Refined in an Era of Superlatives". Vol. 164, no. 56666. p. 9 (Real Estate section). Retrieved October 29, 2016.
6. "The Mail & Express Building, built in 1892, was not the tallest, biggest or first skyscraper, but it was certainly the lightest, the most refined".
  1. Via NYTimes blog.
  2. ProQuest 2212983794 (Oct 24, 3024 blog ed. → ProQuest Central database).
  3. ProQuest 1941455452 (Oct 26, 3024 print ed. → Historical Newspapers database).
  4. ProQuest 1616308658 (Oct 26, 3024 print ed. (duplicate) → Central database).
- New-York Tribune. LCCN sn83-30214, LCCN sn84-31846; ISSN 1941-0646; OCLC 9405688 (all editions).
1. "The Museum of Natural History". "Laying of the Corner-Stone To-Day by President Grant — Addresses Expected by R.L. Stewart, H.G. Stebbins, and Prof. Henry". Vol. 34, no. 10348. June 2, 1874. p. 5 (column 2, lower half).
  1. Via Library of Congress. Chronicling America.
2. Wikipedia links to subjects the article:
3. American Museum of Natural History
  President Grant (1822–1985)
  Col. Henry George Stebbins (1811–1881), President of the New York City Department of Parks
  Robert Leighton Stuart (1806–1882)
  Prof. Henry (né Henry Fairfield Osborn, Sr.; 1857–1935).
4. "His Career as an Editor – Colonel Shepard's Purchase of The Mail and Express". Vol. 52, no. 16932. March 25, 1893. p. 2 (columns 2–3) – via Fultonhistory.com.
  1. Pdf download via Fultonhistory.com (PDF).
5. "The Doctors' Statement – Everything Done for Col. Shepard – His Physicians Say He Died From Sudden Oedema and Congestion of the Lungs". Vol. 52, no. 16934. March 27, 1893. p. 1 (column 4, top).
  1. Pdf download via Fultonhistory.com (PDF).
- Tɪᴍᴇ (March 24, 1924). "The Press": "Rumely". Vol. 3, no. 12. pp. 25–26. LCCN 25-11669; ISSN 0040-781X; OCLC 1767509 (all editions).
1. Blog facsimile via WayBack Machine. Archived from the original on November 21, 2010.
2. Via The Vault.
- University of Oregon (2006). Edward A. Rumely Papers (Coll 122). Eugene – via Special Collections & University Archives. OCLC 19131104.
