= Interlingue literature =

Literature in a constructed language

Interlingue literature broadly encompasses the body of fiction and nonfiction work created or translated into Interlingue, a constructed language created by Edgar de Wahl. Although largely composed of original short stories and translations published in the central magazine of the language, Cosmoglotta, full length novels and poetry anthologies also exist, in particular those by authors such as Vicente Costalago, Jan Amos Kajš, and Jaroslav Podobský.

== History ==
=== Background ===
Interlingue, also known as Occidental, is an international auxiliary language created in 1922 by Estonian teacher Edgar de Wahl. It has a largely Western European vocabulary, based largely on the Romance languages, with heavy influence from English. Created in 1922, it was first published in the magazine Kosmoglott (later Cosmoglotta), where it built a following. Due to a lack of published grammars and standardisation, the earliest works in the language used non-standard orthography and grammatical structures.

=== Publications ===
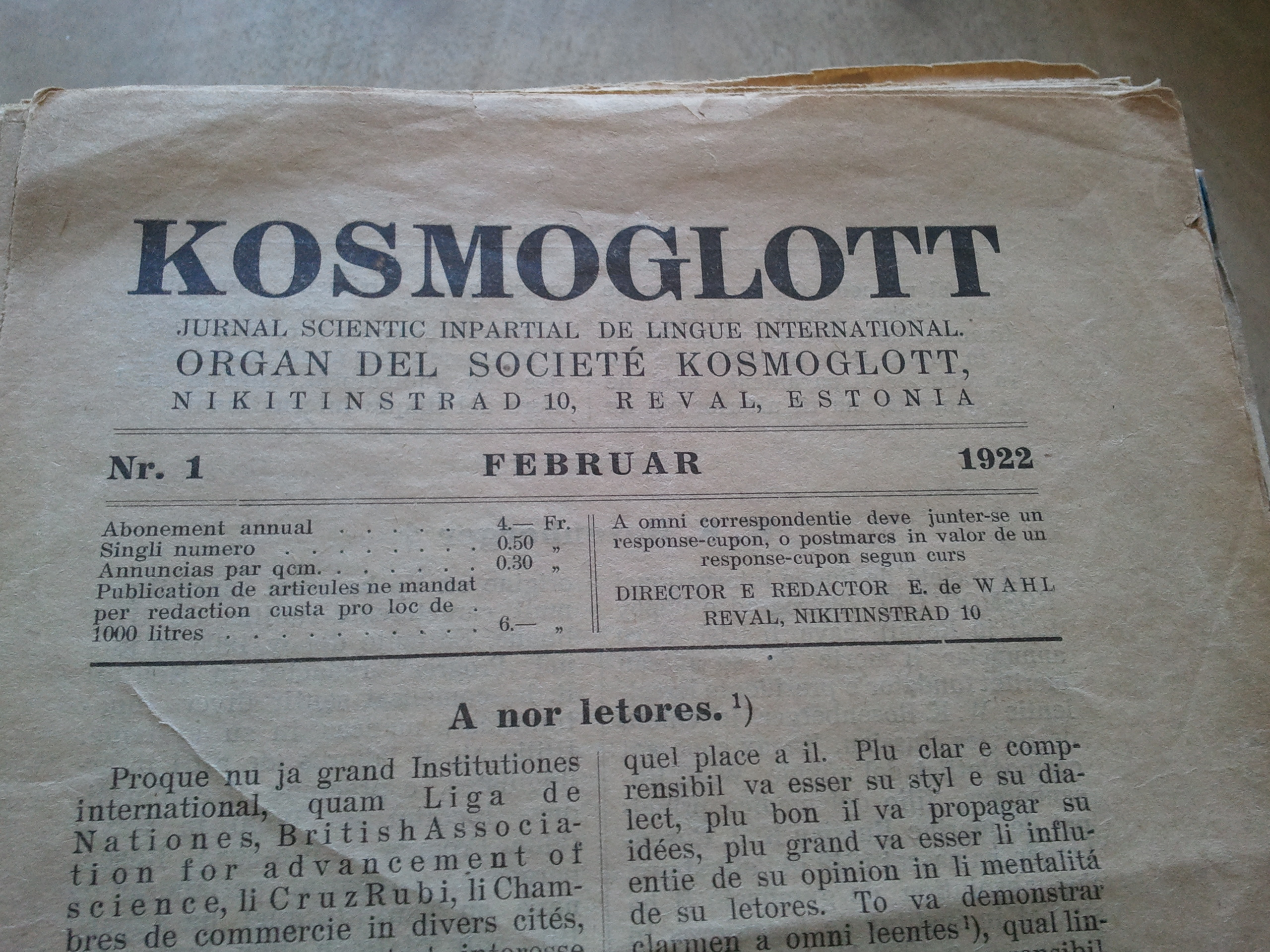
1925 first edition of Kosmoglott

The first known publication in Interlingue is the book Transcendent algebra, mathematical ideography, experiment of a philosophical language (Interlingue: Transcendent algebra, ideografie matematical, experiment de un lingue filosofic) by Estonian linguist Jakob Linzbach, a proposal for a pasigraphy. This was translated into Interlingue by de Wahl at Linzbach's request. This was published before de Wahl formalised the language in Kosmoglott, while the language was still in its development, as a proto-language named "Auli".

The first work of Interlingue literature as art was by Kaarle Julius Saarinen: a translation of the poem "Hymn" ("Hymne") by Finnish journalist and writer Kaarlo Hammar, appeared in the 1925 edition of Kosmoglott. Several other translations of foreign literature were also published by A. Toman around this time, such as the Wanderer's Nightsong poems by Goethe in the 1926 supplement to Kosmoglott, and a translation of "Nationalism in the West" by Rabindranath Tagore.

In Supplement al Cosmoglotta 7 (1927), a translation of work by Persian poet Saadi Shirazi was presented, alongside work by Hermann Keyserling in the following edition in 1928.

A series of translations were published in the 1930s, including Konstantin Balmont's Where is my home?, Manuel Menendez by Edmondo De Amicis, and A Descent into the Maelström by Edgar Allan Poe. Additionally, several original works were published, such as a poetry anthology, Li Astres del Verne (The Planets of Spring), by Podobský, Krasina, raconta del subterrania del Moravian carst by Kajš, and several works by A. E. Cortinas and P. Dimitriev. A short story collection, Historiettes in Occidental, was published in 1930 by Ric Berger.

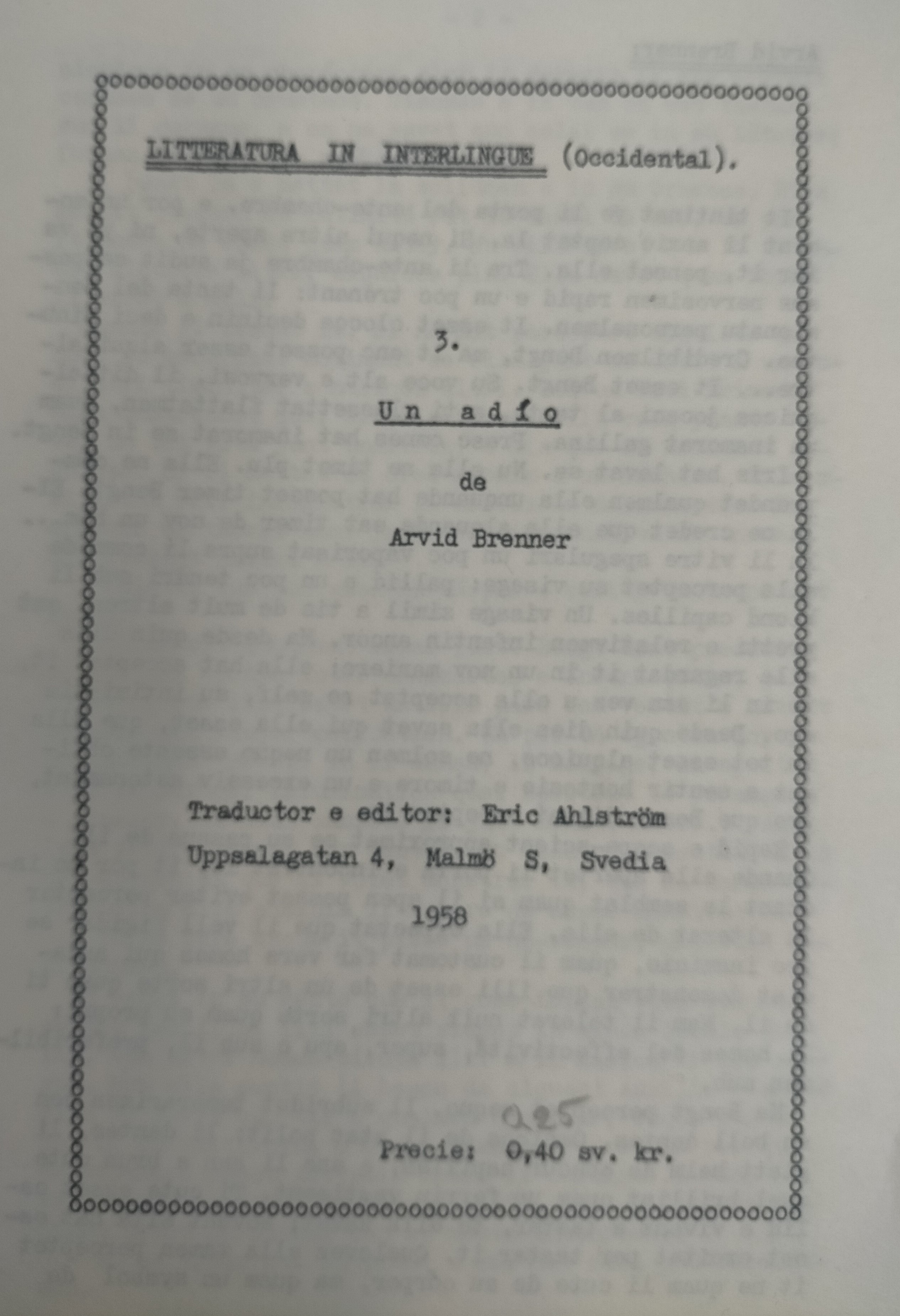
Un Adío (A Goodbye), by Arvid Brenner, translated in 1958 by Eric Ahlström.

In 1951, with the creation of Interlingua, many occidentalists, including Berger, one of the most important figures of the Interlingue movement, began to support this new IALA language. This led to a large destabilisation of the movement, and while Cosmoglotta continued to be published, it did so with diminishing frequency, ceasing publication in 1985. According to Esperantist author Don Harlow, the editor of Cosmoglotta in this period, Adrian Pilgrim stated that Interlingue could be described as a "dead language".

However, publications of new literature in Interlingue continued throughout the 1950s and the early 1960s, with translations including "A Mother Speaks" by Czech Jiří Marek in 1954, Multatuli's "The alocution to the bosses of Lebak", and "Wedding Shirt" by Karel Jaromír Erben, translated by Josef Křesina.

Other translated books included Arvid Brenner's Un Adío (A Farewell) and Bo Bergman's A Desertor by Eric Ahlström in 1958. In 1964, Francis R. Pope published Poemas (Poems), an anthology consisting of poems translated from German, French, and English.

The revival of Interlingue began in 1999 with the creation of a Yahoo! group for the language, after a decade of decay in the 1980s and 1990s. In the early 2000s, Interlingue Wikipedia was created, which had over 5000 articles in 2020.

Many original Interlingue texts as well as translations have been published since 2000, with the first being Stendhal's The Charterhouse of Parma (Li Cartusie de Parma), translated by Robert Winter in 2011. In 2012, Thomas Schmidt published Li Munde de Sandra in an online magazine, Posta Mundi, which contains material published in constructed languages. This was followed with a translation of The Little Prince in 2014 and another one of Li Romance de Photogen e Nycteris in 2019.

Between 2021 and 2024 Vicente Costalago published several original and translated texts in Interlingue. Among the first are Li sercha in li castelle Dewahl e altri racontas, Li tresor de Fluvglant, Subuqti e Verses escapat de mi mente. Among the latter we can find Antologie hispan, Fabules, racontas e mites, and Antologie de poesie europan.

Another important writer is Dorlota Burdon, who has published several original stories in the magazine Posta Mundi. She has also translated The Lunatic, by Khalil Gibran.

== Notable authors ==
- Jan Amos Kajš
- Jaroslav Podobský
- Engelbert Pigal
- Abram Kofman
- A.E. Cortinas
- Ilmari Federn
- Thomas Schmidt
- Dorlota Burdon
- Vicente Costalago

== See also ==
- Esperanto literature
