= History of Interlingue =

History of a constructed language

Interlingue, originally known as Occidental, is a constructed international auxiliary language developed by the Estonian naval officer and linguist Edgar de Wahl in 1922. Designed to combine grammatical regularity with a naturalistic vocabulary, Interlingue draws primarily from Romance and Germanic languages, aiming for immediate intelligibility among speakers of Western European tongues. Its derivational system, notably featuring de Wahl's Rule, facilitates the creation of related word forms, enhancing both consistency and ease of learning.

The language gained prominence in the interwar period, particularly through its official publication, Cosmoglotta, and maintained a dedicated following despite the disruptions of World War II. In 1949, to emphasize its neutrality and foster potential collaboration with the emerging Interlingua community, Occidental was renamed Interlingue. Although the introduction of Interlingua in 1951 led to a decline in Interlingue's usage, the advent of the internet in the late 20th century sparked a revival, with renewed interest and activity among language enthusiasts.

== Background ==
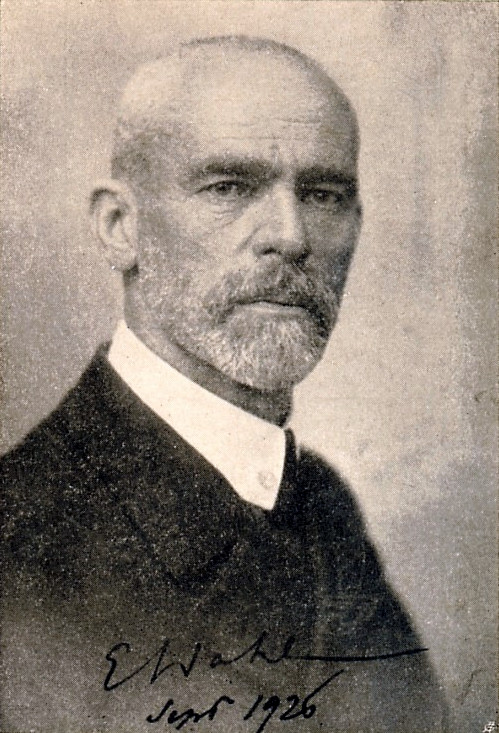
Edgar de Wahl photographed in 1926.

De Wahl was first introduced to planned languages through Volapük, an international auxiliary language released in 1879. De Wahl ended up becoming one of the earliest users of Esperanto, which he encountered for the first time in 1888 during his period as a Volapükist and for which he was in the process of composing a dictionary of marine terms. He quickly became a fervent supporter of Esperanto for a number of years in which he collaborated with Zamenhof on some parts of the language's design and translated one of the first works into Esperanto: "Princidino Mary", published in 1889 originally under the name Princino Mary. He remained an Esperantist until 1894 when the vote to reform Esperanto failed; he was one of just two that voted neither for Esperanto unchanged, nor for the reform proposed by Zamenhof, but for a completely new reform. Occidental would not be announced for a full 28 years after de Wahl had abandoned Esperanto, a period in which he spent working with other language creators trying to develop a system that combined naturalism and regularity, a combination that became a frequently referenced selling point in the promotion of Occidental.

De Wahl spent the years after abandoning Esperanto in collaboration with linguists such as Waldemar Rosenberger (Idiom Neutral), Julius Lott (Mundolingue), and Antoni Grabowski (Modern Latin for a time, before returning to Esperanto). The method sought after by these "partisans of naturalism" was the distillation of existing words into their parts to obtain the international roots within them (such as naturalisation to nat-ur-al-is-ation), then used in other words to keep root words to a minimum while maintaining a natural appearance. In de Wahl's opinion, it was always preferable to opt for a productive suffix than to be forced to coin new words from completely new radicals later on. In addition to this, de Wahl's rule developed later allowed for regular derivation from double-stem Latin verbs.

The Delegation for the Adoption of an International Auxiliary Language, a body of academics formed to study the problem of an international language and which recommended Esperanto with reforms (leading to the language known as Ido), occurred in 1907 before Occidental was announced. De Wahl thus chose to send a memorandum of principles on which to base an international language, a memorandum which arrived after the committee had already adjourned. The memorandum was only noted in passing by Louis Couturat, who was already familiar with de Wahl and his collaborators.

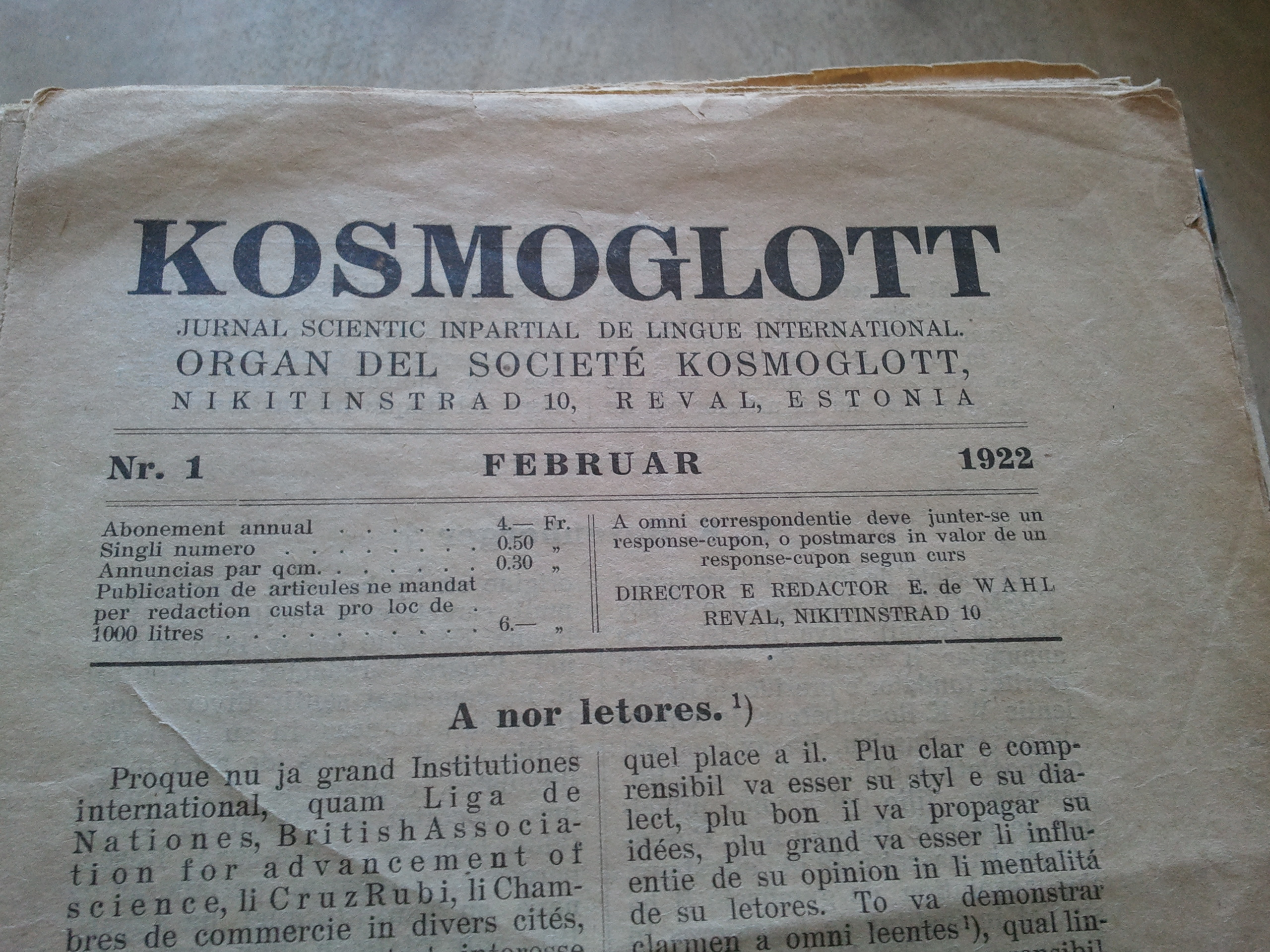
The first issue of Kosmoglott (later Cosmoglotta), published in haste after the announcement that the League of Nations was studying the problem of an international language.

== Beginnings ==
Edgar de Wahl announced the creation of Occidental in 1922 with the first issue of the magazine Cosmoglotta, published in Tallinn, Estonia under the name Kosmoglott. Occidental was a product of years of personal experimentation under the name Auli (auxiliary language), which he used from 1906 to 1921 and which later on gained the nickname proto-Occidental. De Wahl, originally a proponent of Volapük and then Esperanto, began creating Occidental after the failed vote to reform Esperanto in 1894. During the development of the language de Wahl explained his approach in a letter to an acquaintance the Baron d'Orczy written in Auli:

"My direction in the creation of a universal language seems quite regressive to you [...] I understand that quite well, because I am starting it right from the other end. I do not begin with the alphabet and the grammar and then have to adopt the vocabulary to it, but just the other way around: I take all international material of words, suffixes, endings, grammatical forms etc., and then I work to organize that material, put it in order, compile, interpolate, extrapolate and sift through it."

De Wahl also corresponded with Italian mathematician Giuseppe Peano, creator of Latino sine flexione, gaining an appreciation for its selection of international vocabulary. "I believe the "Vocabulario commune" book by Professor Peano to already be a more valuable and scientific work than the entire scholastic literature of Ido on imaginary things evoked by the "fundamento" of Zamenhof", he wrote.

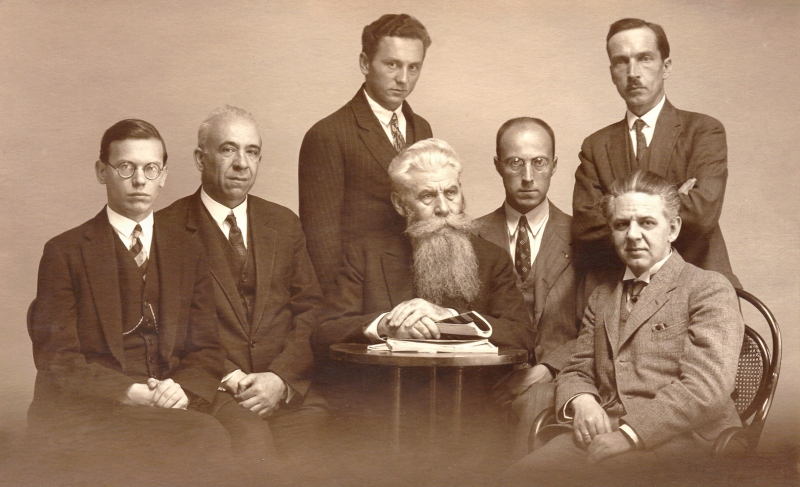
Participants at an Occidental gathering in Vienna, 1928: Engelbert Pigal, Karl Janotta, A. Deminger, Hanns Hörbiger, Eugen Moess, Franz Houdek, Johann Robert Hörbiger

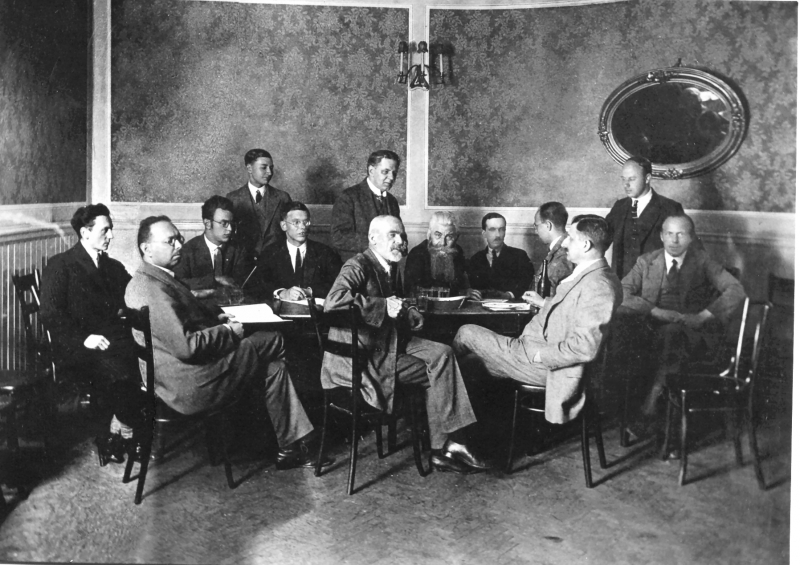
Meeting of Occidental (Interlingue) language users in Vienna in 1927.

Upon its announcement in 1922, Occidental was nearly complete. De Wahl had not intended to announce the language for a few years; after hearing that the League of Nations (LON) had begun an inquiry into the question of an international language he decided to accelerate its release and after receiving a favorable reply the year before from Under-Secretary General Nitobe Inazō of the LON which had adopted a resolution on the subject in 1921. The first known publication in Occidental, a booklet entitled Transcendent Algebra by Jacob Linzbach, appeared shortly before Kosmoglott debuted.

Occidental began gathering followers due to its readability, despite a complete lack of grammars and dictionaries. Two years later in 1924, de Wahl wrote that he was corresponding with about 30 people "in good Occidental" despite the lack of learning material. Two Ido societies joined Occidental in the same year, one in Vienna (Austria) called IdoSocieto Progreso (renamed as Societé Cosmoglott Progress) and the Societo Progreso in Brno (Czechoslovakia), which changed its name to Federali (Federation del amicos del lingue international). The first dictionary, the Radicarium Directiv, a collection of Occidental root words and their equivalents in eight languages, was published the following year.

Kosmoglott was also a forum for various other planned languages, while still mainly written in Occidental. Until 1924 the magazine was also affiliated with the Academia pro Interlingua, which promoted Peano's Latino sine flexione. The name was changed to Cosmoglotta in 1927 as it began to officially promote Occidental in lieu of other languages, and that January the magazine's editorial and administrative office was moved to the Vienna neighborhood of Mauer, now part of Liesing. Much of the early success for Occidental in this period came from the office's new central location, along with the efforts of Engelbert Pigal, also from Austria, whose article Li Ovre de Edgar de Wahl (The Work of Edgar de Wahl) led to interest in Occidental from users of Ido. Use in France began in 1928, and by the beginning of the next decade the Occidental community was established in Germany, Austria, Sweden, Czechoslovakia and Switzerland.

== Vienna period and World War II ==
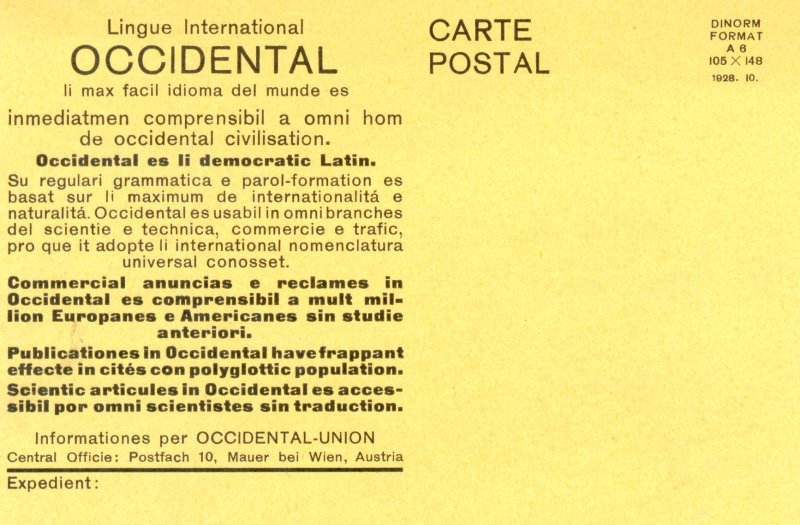
PR postcard with Occidental text created in 1928 in Vienna

The Vienna period was also marked by financial stability. With the help of two major backers, Hanns Hörbiger, also from Vienna, and G.A. Moore from London, "Cosmoglotta thrived despite the economic crisis. After the two died in 1931, Cosmoglotta was again forced to rely on revenue from subscriptions and republications.

The growing movement began campaigning more assertively for Occidental in the early 1930s, leveraging its at-sight readability by contacting organizations such as companies, embassies, printing houses and the LON with letters entirely in Occidental that were often understood and answered. Those letters often included the footer Scrit in lingue international "Occidental" ("Written in the international language Occidental"). A large number of numbered "documents" were produced at this time as well to introduce the concept of an international language and advocate for Occidental as the answer to Europe's "tower of Babel". Recordings of spoken Occidental on gramophone records for distribution were first made in this period.

The years from 1935 to 1939 were particularly active for Cosmoglotta and a second edition of the journal was published. Originally entitled Cosmoglotta-Informationes, it was soon renamed Cosmoglotta B, focusing on items of more internal interest such as linguistic issues, reports of Occidental in the news, and financial updates. In early 1936, not counting the 110 issues of Cosmoglotta and other journals and bulletins, a total of 80 publications existed in and about Occidental.

But the years before World War II posed difficulties for Occidental and other planned languages. They were banned in Germany, Austria and Czechoslovakia, forced to disband, kept under surveillance by the Gestapo, which also destroyed instructional materials. The prohibition of auxiliary languages in Germany was particularly damaging as this was where most Occidentalists lived at the time. The inability to accept payment for subscriptions was a financial blow that continued after the war along with Germany's division into zones of influence, not all of which allowed payments.

De Wahl, in Tallinn, was unable to communicate with the Occidental Union in Switzerland from 1939 to October 1947, first due to the war and thereafter the interception of mail between Switzerland and the Soviet Union. Unaware of this, de Wahl was bewildered at the lack of response to his continued letters; even a large collection of poetry translated into Occidental was never delivered. The only letter of his received in Switzerland came in 1947, asking the Occidental Union why it had not answered any of his. Meanwhile, de Wahl's house and his entire library had been destroyed during the bombardment of Tallinn. De Wahl himself was incarcerated for a time after refusing to leave Estonia for Germany, and later took refuge in a psychiatric hospital where he lived out his life.

The outbreak of war in 1939 put a halt to publications of both Cosmoglottas through 1940, but in 1941 Cosmoglotta B began publication once again and continued until 1950. An edition of either Cosmoglotta A or B was published every month between January 1937 and September 1939, and then (after the initial shock of the war) every month from September 1941 to June 1951. During the war, only those in neutral Switzerland and Sweden were able to fully devote themselves to the language, carrying on activities semi-officially.

During the war, Occidentalists noticed that the language was often permitted to be sent by telegram within and outside of Switzerland (especially to and from Sweden) even without official recognition, surmising that censors were able to understand it and may have thought them to be written in Spanish or Romansch, a minor yet official language in Switzerland that at the time lacked a standardized orthography. This allowed some communication to take place between the Occidentalists in Switzerland and Sweden. The other centers of Occidental activity in Europe did not fare as well, with the stocks of study materials in Vienna and Tallinn having been destroyed in bombings and numerous Occidentalists sent to concentration camps in Germany and Czechoslovakia.

Contacts were reestablished shortly after the war by those who remained, with letters from countries such as France, Czechoslovakia, Finland and Great Britain reaching Cosmoglotta. Writers said they were ready to begin activities anew for the language. Cosmoglotta had subscribers in 58 cities in Switzerland a few months before the end of World War II in Europe, and Cosmoglotta A began publication again in 1946.

== Language standardization ==
During the war many Occidentalists took to standardizing the language. De Wahl had created Occidental with a number of unchangeable features, but believed that its following of the "laws of life" gave it a firm enough base that it could follow a "natural evolution". Its flexibility would "allow time and practice to take care of modifications that would prove to be necessary". As a result, some words had more than one permissible form, which could not be resolved by decree alone, thus leaving the ultimate decision to the community by including both possible forms in the first Occidental dictionaries.

One example concerned the verb scrir (to write) and a possible other form scripter, as both created internationally recognizable derivations: scritura and scritor from scrir, or scriptura and scriptor from scripter. De Wahl expressed a preference for scrir, finding scripter to be somewhat heavy, but commented that the latter was certainly permissible and that Occidental might take on a similar evolution to natural languages in which both forms come into common use, with the longer form having a heavier and formal character and the shorter form a lighter and more everyday tone (such as English story vs. history).

Orthography was another area in which several possibilities existed, namely etymologic orthography (adtractiv, obpression), historic orthography (attractiv, oppression), or simplified orthography (atractiv, opression). The first option was hardly if ever used, and simplified orthography eventually became the standard by 1939. Much of the standardization of the language took place in this way through community preference (e.g. both ac and anc were proposed for the word "also" but the community quickly settled on anc), but not all. With questions still remaining about the official form of some words and a lack of general material destined for the general public, much time during World War II was spent on language standardization and course creation, and due to the continuing war, in August 1943 the decision was made to create an interim academy to officialize this process.

This process had just about begun not long before the war, and the Swiss Occidentalists, finding themselves isolated from the rest of the continent, opted to concentrate on instructional materials to have ready by the end of the war. While doing so, they frequently found themselves confronted with the decision between two "theoretically equally good" forms that had remained in popular usage, but whose presence could be confusing to a new learner of the language. The academy maintained that standardization efforts were based on actual usage, stating that:

...the standardization of the language has natural limits. 'Standardizing' the language does not mean arbitrarily officializing one of the possible solutions and rejecting the others as indesirable and irritating. One only standardizes solutions that have already been sanctioned through practice."

== IALA, Interlingua, and name change to Interlingue ==
The International Auxiliary Language Association (IALA), founded in 1924 to study and determine the best planned language for international communication, was at first viewed with suspicion by the Occidental community. Its co-founder Alice Vanderbilt Morris was an Esperantist, as were many of its staff, and many Occidentalists including de Wahl himself believed that its leadership under Esperantist William Edward Collinson (known among readers of Cosmoglotta for an article of his entitled "Some weak points of Occidental") meant that it had been set up with a staff of professional linguists under a neutral and scientific pretext to bolster a final recommendation for Esperanto. Relations soon improved, however, as it became clear that the IALA intended to be as impartial as possible by familiarizing itself with all existing planned languages. Ric Berger, a prominent Occidentalist who later joined Interlingua in the 1950s, detailed one such visit he made in 1935 to Morris that vastly improved his opinion of the organization:

My personal opinion was not so pessimistic, for, finding myself in Brussels in 1935, I sought out Mrs. Morris and soon obtained an audience with her where my charming host invited me to speak in Occidental. She asked her husband, the American ambassador, to come hear me to confirm what seemed to very much interest them: a language in which all words can be understood without having learned it! [...] Mrs. Morris could have used her fortune to simply support Esperanto, which was her right as a convicted Esperantist. But instead of that she [...] decided to donate her money to a neutral linguistic tribunal to solve the problem scientifically, even if the judgement goes against her convictions.

In 1945, the IALA announced that it planned to create its own language and showed four possible versions under consideration, all of which were naturalistic as opposed to schematic. Occidentalists were by and large pleased that the IALA had decided to create a language so similar in nature to Occidental, seeing it as a credible association that gave weight to their argument that an auxiliary language should proceed from study of natural languages instead of attempting to fit them into an artificial system. Ric Berger was particularly positive in describing the language the IALA was creating as a victory for the natural school ("Li naturalitá esset victoriosi!") and "almost the same language" in 1948, But he still had reservations, doubting whether a project with such a similar aspect and structure would be able to "suddenly cause prejudices [against planned languages] to fall and create unity among the partisans of international languages". He also feared that it might simply "disperse the partisans of the natural language with nothing to show for it" after Occidental had created "unity in the naturalistic school" for so long.

Interlingua and Occidental were similar; although while the two languages had a 90% identical vocabulary without orthographic differences taken into account (e.g. with filosofie and philosophia considered the same word), structurally and derivationally they were very different. De Wahl's Rule in Occidental had mostly done away with Latin double stem verbs (verbs such as act: ager, act- or send: mitter, miss-), while Interlingua simply accepted them as part and parcel of a naturalistic system. The control languages (Italian, Spanish and/or Portuguese, French, English) used by Interlingua to form its vocabulary for the most part require an eligible word to be found in three source languages (the "rule of three"), which would conflict with Occidental's Germanic substrate and various other words which would be by definition ineligible in a unified language that retained Interlingua's methodology. Accepting Occidental words such as mann, strax, old and sestra (Interlingua: viro, immediatemente, vetere, soror) into Interlingua could only be done by doing away with the control languages, the very core of Interlingua's methodology for determining its vocabulary. Interlingua also allowed optional irregular verbal conjugations such as so, son and sia as the first-person singular, third-person plural and subjunctive form of esser, the verb 'to be'.

Occidental was also still recovering from the war. Cosmoglotta continued to report into 1946 on who had survived the war, who among them were ready to participate again and those who were still out of touch. The magazine was financially strained by inflated postwar printing costs and its inability to collect payments from certain countries, a marked contrast to the well-funded New York-based IALA.

International politics was another difficulty for Occidentalists after the war. The beginning of the Cold War created a particularly uncomfortable situation for the Occidental-Union, whose name coincided with that of an anti-Russian political league; the Swiss Occidentalists believed that was why all of de Wahl's letters from Tallinn were intercepted. De Wahl remained unaware of developments in the language and the proposal for the rest of his life. In early 1948 the Czechoslovak Occidentalists had begun requesting a new name that would allow them to continue their linguistic activities without suspicion, proposing the name Interal (International auxiliari lingue), to which the union responded that the term Interlingue would be more appropriate and that they were free to introduce the language as "Interlingue (Occidental)", or even remove the mention of Occidental in parentheses if they wanted. Ric Berger began advocating for a change of name from Occidental to Interlingue in 1948 which he also hoped would aid in a fusion between the two languages. The official vote on the name change to Interlingue took place at the plenum of the Occidental Union in 1949 and was passed with 91 per cent support, making the official name Interlingue, with Interlingue (Occidental) also permitted, starting September 1949.

The 1951 debut of Interlingua weakened Interlingue-Occidental, which until then had been unchallenged in the field of naturalistic planned auxiliary languages. Vĕra Barandovská-Frank's perception of the situation at the time was as follows (translated from Esperanto):

In the field of naturalistic planned languages Occidental-Interlingue was until then unchallenged (especially after the death of Otto Jespersen, author of Novial), as all new projects were nearly imitations of it. This applied to Interlingua as well, but it carried with it a dictionary of 27 000 words put together by professional linguists that brought great respect, despite in principle only confirming the path that de Wahl had started. The Senate of the Interlingue-Union and the Interlingue-Academie took up the proposals that (1) the Interlingue-Union become a collective member of the IALA and (2) the Interlingue-Union remain favourable to the future activity of the IALA and morally support it. The first proposition was not accepted, but the second was, giving a practical collaboration and support to Interlingua.

André Martinet, the second-last director of the IALA, made similar observations to those of Matejka. He confessed that his preferred variant of Interlingua was the one closer to Interlingue than the one officialized by Gode. In these circumstances the efforts by Ric Berger to move all users of Interlingue en masse to Interlingua de IALA was a shock. His heresy caused doubt and interruptions in Interlingue circles, especially after he became involved in the publication of "Revista de Interlingua". The former idea of a natural fusion of both languages was shown to be unrealistic, with the new language becoming a rival.

Don Harlow similarly summarizes the year 1951 for Occidental:

Interlingua had a ready-made constituency. Almost thirty years had passed since the creation of Occidental, whose strength in the "naturalistic" world had prevented other "naturalistic" projects from developing their own movements. But Occidental's star had waned since the war. Now, like a bolt from the blue, came this heaven-sent gift: a new constructed language even more "naturalistic" than Occidental. In spite of attempts by diehard supporters of Occidental to stave off the inevitable — for instance, by such tactics as renaming their language Interlingue — most remaining Occidentalists made the short pilgrimage to the shrine of Interlingua.

== Stagnation and revival ==
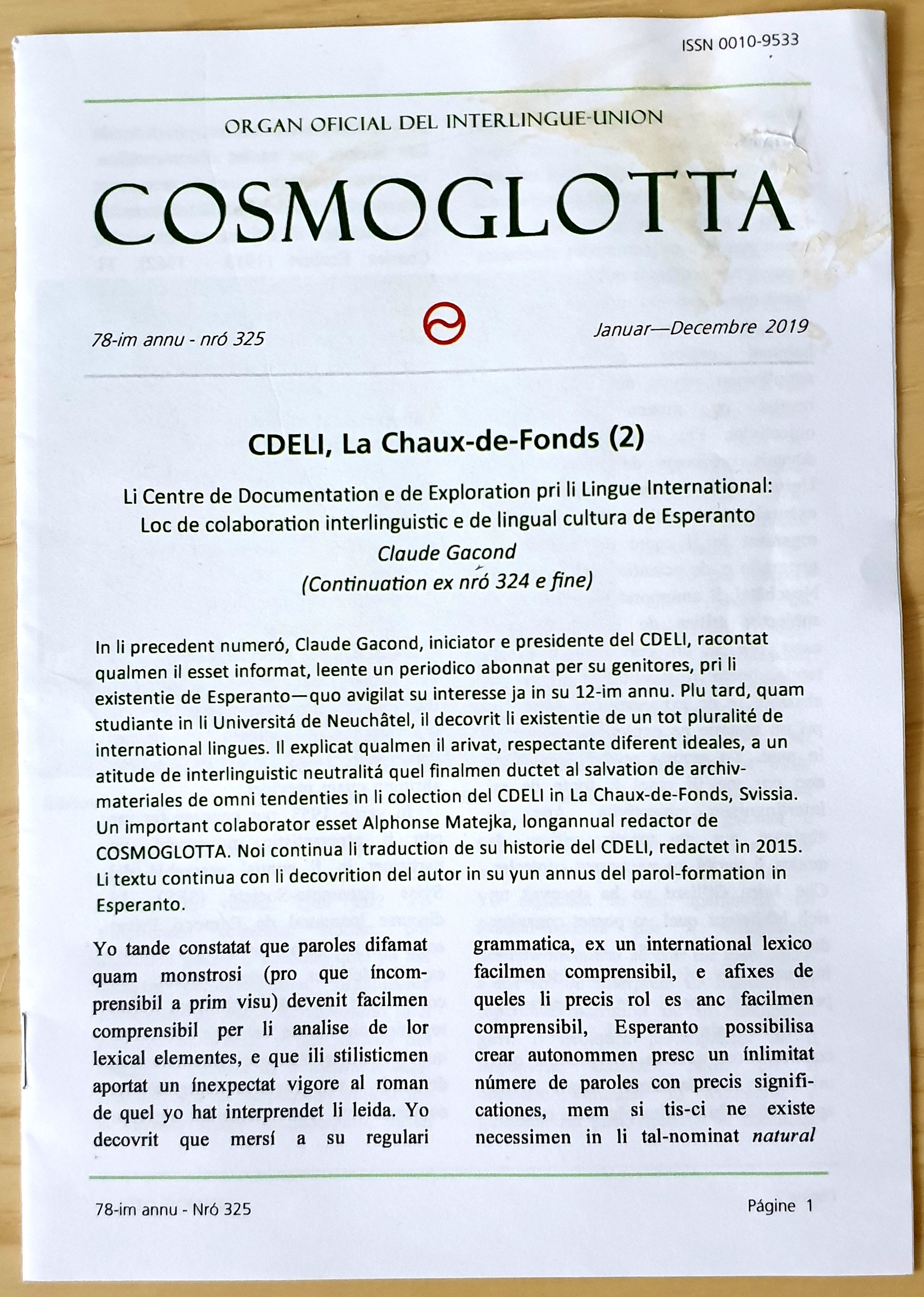
Issue 325 of Cosmoglotta for the period January to December 2019.

While the migration of so many users to Interlingua had severely weakened Interlingue, the ensuing drop in activity was gradual and took place over decades. Cosmoglotta B ceased publication after 1950, and the frequency of Cosmoglotta A began to gradually drop: once every second month from 1952, and then once per quarter from 1963. Other bulletins in Interlingue continued to appear during this time such as Cive del Munde (Switzerland), Voce de Praha (Czechoslovakia), Sved Interlinguist (Sweden), International Memorandum (United Kingdom), Interlinguistic Novas (France), Jurnale Scolari International (France), Buletine Pedagogic International (France), Super li Frontieras (France), Interlingue-Postillon (1958, Germany), Novas de Oriente (1958, Japan), Amicitie european (1959, Switzerland), Teorie e practica (Switzerland-Czechoslovakia, 1967), and Novas in Interlingue (Czechoslovakia, 1971). Barandovská-Frank believed that the ebb in interest in Occidental-Interlingue occurred in concert with the aging of the generation that was first drawn to it from other planned languages (translated from Esperanto):

Most of those interested in Interlingue belonged to the generation that became acquainted in turn with Volapük, Esperanto and Ido, later on finding the most aesthetic (essentially naturalistic) solution in Occidental-Interlingue. Many subsequently moved to IALA's Interlingua, which however did not prove to be much more successful despite the impression its scientific origin made, and those who remained loyal to Occidental-Interlingue did not succeed in imparting their enthusiasm to a new generation.

Activity in Interlingue reached a low during the 1980s and early 1990s, when Cosmoglotta publication ceased for a few years. While issue 269 was published in 1972 after publishing once per season between 1963, issue 289 was not reached until summer 2000 for an average of less than one issue per year. According to Harlow, "in 1985 Occidental's last periodical, Cosmoglotta, ceased publication, and its editor, Mr. Adrian Pilgrim, is quoted as having described Occidental as a 'dead language.'" A decade later, a documentary film in 1994 by Steve Hawley and Steyger on planned languages introduced Interlingue speaker Donald Gasper as "one of the last remaining speakers of the language Occidental".

As was the case for other planned languages, the arrival of the Internet spurred Interlingue's revival. In the year 1999 the first Yahoo! Group in Occidental was founded, Cosmoglotta had begun publishing intermittently again, and the language became a subject of discussion in literature on auxiliary languages. One example is The Esperanto Book released in 1995 by Harlow, who wrote that Occidental had an intentional emphasis on European forms and that some of its leading followers espoused a Eurocentric philosophy, which may have hindered its spread. Still, the opposite view was also common in the community and Occidental gained adherents in many nations including Asian nations. An Interlingue Wikipedia was approved in 2004. In recent years official meetings of Interlingue speakers have resumed: one in Ulm in 2013, another in Munich in 2014 with three participants, and a third in Ulm the next year with five.

== Timeline ==
	Events	Written works
1894	Vote to reform Esperanto fails; Edgar de Wahl leaves the movement.	
1921	First appearance of the language Occidental in the booklet Transcendent Algebra by Estonian linguist Jacob Linzbach.	
1922	February: First edition of Kosmoglott published, announcing the language Occidental.	
1927	January: Kosmoglott changes to Cosmoglotta and begins promoting the language Occidental exclusively.	
1929		November: Engelbert Pigal publishes Pro principie, Un parábol, in Cosmoglotta A 066.
1937	May: Alphonse Matejka leaves Ido and joins Occidental. A long-time adversary of Ric Berger for a decade, Matejka would end up staying with the language up to his death in 1999.	
1949	Vote to change the name of the language from Occidental to Interlingue passes, with the new name coming into effect on the 1st of September.	
1994	A documentary film by Steve Hawley and Steyger on planned languages introduced Interlingue speaker Donald Gasper as "one of the last remaining speakers of the language Occidental".	
2004	August: Wikipedia in Interlingue established.	
2012		December: Thomas Schmidt publishes Li Munde de Sandra in the e-journal Posta Mundi.
2014		Li Litt Prince, a translation by Thomas Schmidt of The Little Prince by Antoine de Saint-Exupéry.
2021		December: Li sercha in li castelle Dewahl e altri racontas, a book by Vicente Costalago that contains three original texts.
2022		May: Republication of Grammatica de Interlingue, written by F. Haas in 1956.
