= Comparison between Interlingue and Interlingua =

Comparison of related international auxiliary languages

Interlingue and Interlingua are constructed international auxiliary languages.

== Nomenclature ==
Interlingu- applies to three international auxiliary languages:

- Interlingua de Peano, published by the Italian mathematician Giuseppe Peano in 1903 and known most commonly as Latino sine flexione (Latin without inflections).
- Interlingue, published by Edgar de Wahl in 1922 and officially known as Occidental until 1949.
- Interlingua de IALA, published by the International Auxiliary Language Association (IALA) in 1951.

To avoid confusion, this article refers to Interlingue as Occidental until the name change in 1949 and Occidental-Interlingue afterwards, Interlingua de IALA as Interlingua, and any references to Interlingua de Peano as Latino sine flexione.

== History ==
Approximately 30 years older than Interlingua, the beginnings of Occidental-Interlingue reach back to 1894 when its founder Edgar de Wahl, until then an active Esperantist and one of its pioneers, chose to leave the language and begin creating his own after the vote in 1894 to reform the language failed. De Wahl spent the years in between collaborating with other auxiliary language creators and working on his own language, which appeared for the first time in the book Transcendental Algebra by Estonian linguist Jakob Linzbach in 1921, followed by its announcement in the magazine Kosmoglott in February the following year.

The beginnings of Interlingua reach back to 1924 and the foundation of the IALA by Alice Vanderbilt Morris and her husband Dave Hennen Morris. While the IALA originally did not intend to create its own language, it began showing an interest in the possibility in the years after 1934 when it rejected the idea of a completely schematic auxiliary language, leaning towards a naturalistic language; at this time it began creating models for languages based on schematic languages like Ido and naturalistic languages like Occidental to aid it in deciding on which language model to adopt.

== Vocabulary and linguistic character ==
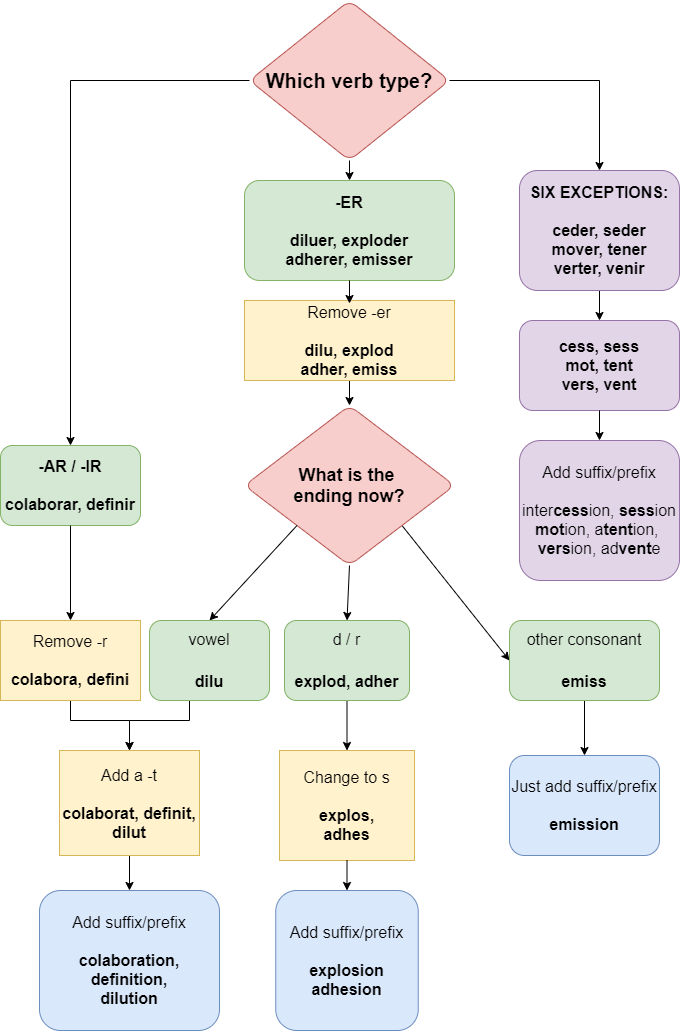
Flow chart on how nouns are derived from verbs in Occidental-Interlingue using De Wahl's Rule

Both Occidental-Interlingue and Interlingua are naturalistic constructed languages based on common Western European vocabulary, and share approximately 90% the same vocabulary when orthographic differences and final vowels (filisofie vs. philosophia for example) are not taken into account. Despite this, prominent supporters of both Occidental-Interlingue and Interlingua saw the similar vocabulary as superficial, and unrelated to the inherent character of their languages. Alexander Gode, one of the creators of Interlingua, believed that its grouping with Peano's Latino sine Flexione and Occidental-Interlingue as naturalistic planned languages was done "according to exclusively superficial and external similarities", and that it was the "idealism" of de Wahl that "prevented him from freeing himself from traditional Esperantism", an idealism that he defined as "subordinating the observed facts to the preconceived idea and ideal of what an auxiliary language should be."

Derivation from verbs in Occidental-Interlingue is regularized as much as possible using De Wahl's rule, while in Interlingua such a rule does not exist and so-called Latin double stem verbs (e.g. scriber to script-) are brought in without changes.

== Orthography ==
Interlingua uses traditional Greco-Roman orthography with digraphs such as ph and th, the vocalic y and doubled consonants (e.g. tyranno, emphatic and Christo instead of tirano, emfatic and Cristo). A so-called collateral orthography exists for those who prefer a simplified spelling.

== Grammar ==
Both Occidental-Interlingue and Interlingua are promoted as languages with an international vocabulary and minimal grammar, and a form of "modern Latin".

A comparison of the basic grammar between the two languages (cited from the Grammatica de Interlingue in Interlingue by Dr. F. Haas and A Grammar of Interlingua by Alexander Gode and Hugh Blair) is as follows:

Comparative verb forms
	Occidental-Interlingue	Interlingua
Verbs end in:	-ar, -er, -ir	
**Present tense**	**Remove the infinitival -r.** Exception: es for esser (to be)	
**Present tense**		Additional exceptions: ha for haber (to have), va for vader (to go)
**Past tense**	**Replace the infinitival -r with -t.**	**Replace the final -r with -va.** Optional irregular forms: era instead of esseva for esser
**Past participle**	**Replace the infinitival -r with -t.**	**Replace the infinitival -r with -te.** Note: -er verbs change their -e- to -i- (e.g. vider becomes vidite)

=== Correlatives ===
The correlatives for both languages tend to follow a q-, t-, and al- distinction in which Occidental-Interlingue "tries to retain regularity as well", while in some parts Interlingua is more regular than Occidental (the universal series with omne), while in others not (e.g., the temporal series). Correlatives considered regular by Federico Gobbo in the source are indicated in bold.

Correlatives in Occidental-Interlingue, Interlingua and English equivalents
	?	→	∃	∀	∄
Quantum	**qu**ant **qu**anto (how much)	**t**ant **t**anto (so much)	**al**quant **ali**quanto (somewhat)	totmen **omne** quanto (every quantity)	**ne**quant nulle (none)
Modus	**qu**almen como (how)	**t**almen **t**anto (so)	in **al**cun maniere de **ali**cun maniera (somehow)	in omni maniere in **omne** maniera (in every way)	**ne**qualmen nullemente (in no way)
Tempus	**qu**ande **qu**ando (when)	**t**ande **t**unc (then)	**al**quande **ali**quando (sometime)	sempre semper (always)	**ne**quande nunquam (never)
Locus	u ubi (where)	**t**a ibi (there)	**al**cú **ali**ubi (somewhere)	partú ubique / in **omne**s partes (everywhere)	**n**ecú nusquam/in nulle parte (nowhere)

== Mutual influence ==
A certain amount of influence has taken place between the two languages.

=== Influence of Interlingua on Occidental-Interlingue ===
After the standardization of Occidental in 1947 and the renaming to Interlingue there was a push towards more naturalistic forms, particularly by Ric Berger, who advocated replacing the optional -i adjectival ending with -e. After advocating for the change in April 1949 he began implementing it the following month in his own writing and most of the content in Cosmoglotta, in addition to other changes such as nostre (our) and vostre (your) instead of nor and vor. The following April he defended the changes, denying that they were a "concession to the IALA" but instead a simple "concession to the general tendency towards greater naturalism found today in the interlinguistic movement", calling critics of the changes victims of "long-lasting habits" and an "optical illusion". Berger left his position as editor of Cosmoglotta soon after and eventually joined Interlingua in 1956.

=== Influence of Occidental-Interlingue on Interlingua ===
The Interlingua dictionary notes that some words from earlier planned languages such as Occidental do not contradict the methodology of Interlingua and were therefore introduced into it. They are marked in the IED with square brackets. Examples:

- “yo”
- “esque”
- “anque”
- “ci”
- “pois”
- “depois”.

In a later period, some words were borrowed from Occidental. They do not appear in the original dictionary but are used and can be found in other dictionaries. These words include “besonio,” “besoniar,” and “micre.”

== Samples ==
=== Lord's Prayer ===
Occidental-Interlingue	Interlingua	English (traditional)
Patre nor, qui es in li cieles, mey tui nómine esser sanctificat, mey tui regnia venir, mey tui vole esser fat, qualmen in li cieles talmen anc sur li terre. Da nos hodie nor pan omnidial, e pardona nor débites, qualmen anc noi pardona nor debitores. E ne inducte nos in tentation, ma libera nos de lu mal. Amen.	Patre nostre, qui es in le celos, que tu nomine sia sanctificate; que tu regno veni; que tu voluntate sia facite como in le celo, etiam super le terra. Da nos hodie nostre pan quotidian, e pardona a nos nostre debitas como etiam nos los pardona a nostre debitores. E non induce nos in tentation, sed libera nos del mal. Amen.	Our father, who art in heaven, hallowed be thy name; thy kingdom come, thy will be done. on earth, as it is in heaven. Give us this day our daily bread; and forgive us our debts as we have forgiven our debtors. And lead us not into temptation, but deliver us from evil. Amen.

=== Sample text by Dr. F. Haas in 1957 ===
Occidental-Interlingue	Interlingua
Estimat seniores,	Estimate seniores,
Noi ha recivet vor lettre del 12.4.57 e invia vos ci-junt li factura e li conossement del cargament de buttre quel vu benevolet comendar nos.	Nos ha recipite vostre epistola del 12.4.57 e manda vos hic juncte le factura e le cognoscimento del cargamento de butyro que vos nos ha facite le placer de ordinar.
Ples misser nos li summa de $1250.- in un chec sur New York, in conformitá con li conditiones de nor contrate de compra.	Manda nos, si il vos place, le summa de $1250.- in un cheque super Nove York, in conformitate con le conditiones de nostre contracto de emption.
Noi ha efortiat nos selecter li maxim bon qualitá de buttre obtenibil, pro que noi bon conosse li besones de vor mercate e save quant exigent es vor clientela in Svissia.	Nos nos ha effortiate de seliger le plus bon qualitate de butyro obtenibile quia nos ben cognosce le requirimentos de vostre mercato e sape quante exigente es vostre clientela in Switza.
Concernent li duesim demí de vor comenda, noi regretabilmen ancor ne posse indicar vos li exact date de expedition, ma noi espera que it ne va esser tro tard, si noi successa far li imbarcament intra tri semanes.	Concernente le secunde medietate de vostre ordine, nos infelicemente nondum pote indicar vos le data exacte de expedition, sed nos spera que il non essera nimis tarde si nos succede de facer le imbarcamento intra tres septimanas.
Si vu desira comprar un nov partie de merces, noi peti vos scrir nos per retorn de posta. In response a un recent inqueste quel noi havet li ocasion far inter li productores, noi recivet in facte li information que ili besona hodie un termin de liveration de adminim quin mensus por executer li comendas.	Si vos desira emer un nove lot de merces, nos vos pete scriber nos per retorno de posta. In responsa a un recente inquesta que nos habeva le opportunitate facer inter le productores, nos recipeva in facto le information que illes require hodie un termino de livration de al minus cinque menses pro exequer le ordines.
Esperante que vu va esser plenmen satisfat de nor servicie, noi saluta vos sincermen, X.Y.	Sperante que vos essera plenmente satisfacte de nostre servicio, nos vos saluta sincermente, X.Y.
