= Interlingue =

International auxiliary language created 1922

- Occidental
- Interlingue
- Created by: Edgar de Wahl
- Date: 1922
- Setting and usage: International auxiliary language
- Purpose: Constructed language based on Indo-European languages
- Early form: Auli
- Writing system: Latin script

Language codes
- ISO 639-1: ie
- ISO 639-2: ile
- ISO 639-3: ile
- Glottolog: inte1260

From the Lord's Prayer (in Interlingue)

Patre nor, qui es in li cieles, mey tui nómine esser sanctificat...

Interlingue ([interˈliŋɡwe]), originally Occidental ([oktsidenˈtaːl]), is an international auxiliary language created in 1922 and renamed in 1949. Its creator, Edgar de Wahl, sought to achieve maximal grammatical regularity and natural character. The vocabulary is based on pre-existing words from various languages and a derivational system which uses recognized prefixes and suffixes.

Many of Interlingue's derived word forms reflect those common to certain Western European languages, primarily the Romance languages, along with some Germanic vocabulary. Many of its words are formed using de Wahl's rule, a set of rules for regular conversion of all but six verb infinitives into derived words including from Latin double-stem verbs (e.g. vider to see and its derivative vision). The result is a naturalistic and regular language that is easy to understand at first sight for individuals acquainted with certain Western European languages. Readability and simplified grammar, along with the regular appearance of the magazine Cosmoglotta, made Occidental popular in Europe during the years before World War II despite efforts by the Nazis to suppress international auxiliary languages.

Occidental survived the war, but the community had been out of touch with the language's creator since 1939. A Baltic German naval officer and teacher from Estonia, de Wahl refused to leave his Tallinn home for Germany, even after his house was destroyed in the 1943 air raids on the city forcing him to take refuge in a psychiatric hospital. Since most of his mail had been intercepted, he died in 1948 largely unaware of developments in the language. The name change to Interlingue took place the following year for two reasons: (1) to demonstrate to the Soviet Union the language's neutrality, and (2) the expectation of a possible union or closer collaboration with the community around Interlingua, a competing naturalistic project under development. Many users were lost following the latter's appearance in 1951, beginning a period of decline until the advent of the Internet.

== History and activity ==
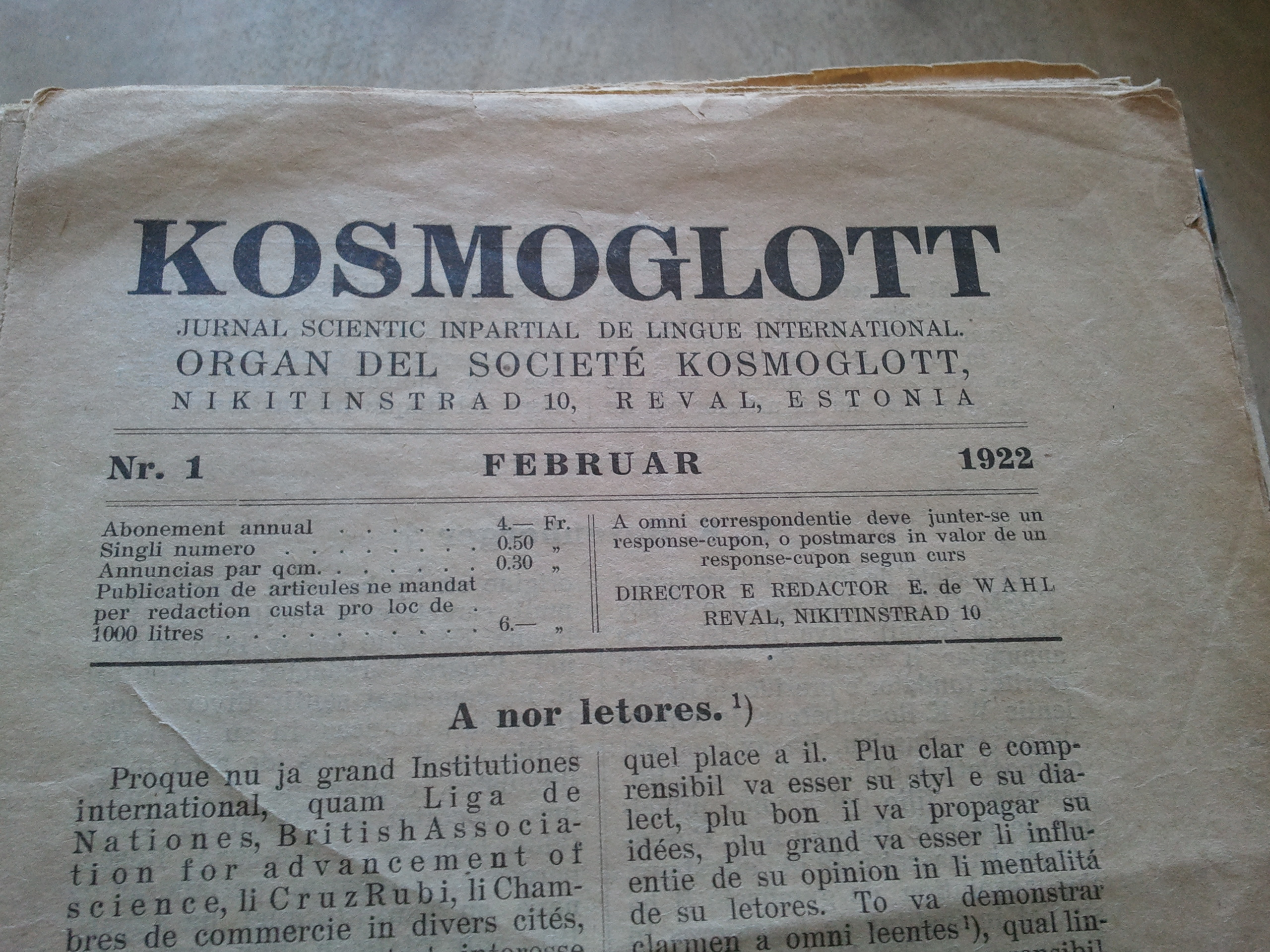
The first issue of Kosmoglott (later Cosmoglotta), published in haste after the announcement that the League of Nations was studying the problem of an international language.

=== Beginnings ===
Edgar de Wahl announced the creation of Occidental in 1922 with the first issue of the magazine Cosmoglotta, published in Tallinn, Estonia under the name Kosmoglott. Occidental was a product of years of personal experimentation under the name Auli (auxiliary language), which he used from 1906 to 1921 and which later on gained the nickname proto-Occidental. De Wahl, originally a proponent of Volapük and then Esperanto, began creating Occidental after the failed vote to reform Esperanto in 1894.

De Wahl corresponded with other language creators, among them the Italian mathematician Giuseppe Peano (creator of Latino sine flexione), from whom he gained an appreciation for its selection of international vocabulary, and Waldemar Rosenberger, the creator of Idiom Neutral.

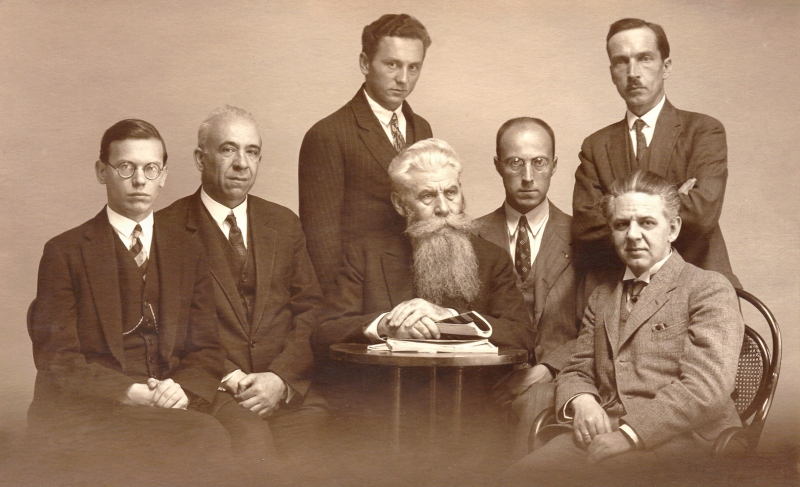
Participants at an Occidental gathering in Vienna, 1928: Engelbert Pigal, Karl Janotta, A. Deminger, Hanns Hörbiger, Eugen Moess, Franz Houdek, Johann Robert Hörbiger

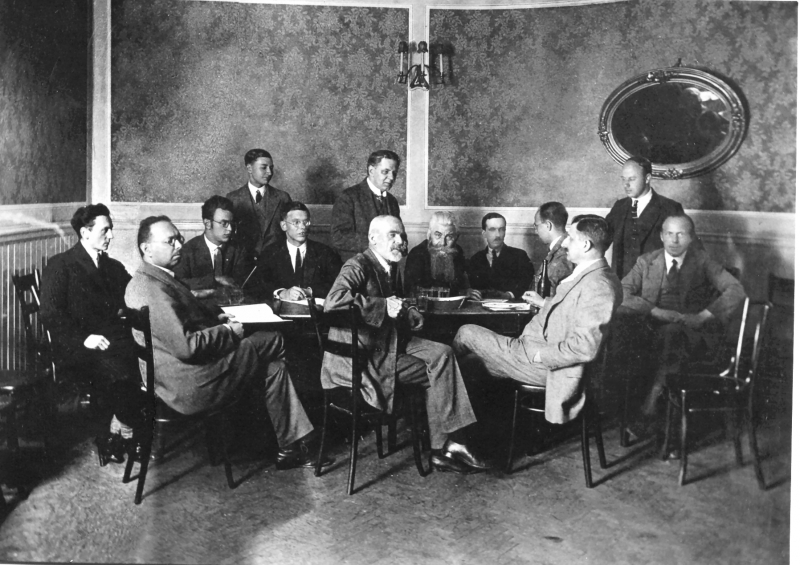
Meeting of Occidental (Interlingue) language users in Vienna in 1927.

Upon its announcement in 1922, Occidental was nearly complete. De Wahl had not intended to announce the language for a few years, but decided to accelerate its release after hearing that the League of Nations (LON) had begun an inquiry into the question of an international language. The first known publication in Occidental, a booklet entitled Transcendent Algebra by Jacob Linzbach, appeared shortly before Kosmoglott debuted.

Occidental began gathering followers due to its readability, despite a complete lack of grammars and dictionaries. Two years later in 1924, de Wahl wrote that he was corresponding with about 30 people "in good Occidental" despite the lack of learning material, and users of other languages began to join Occidental. The first dictionary, the Radicarium Directiv, a collection of Occidental root words and their equivalents in eight languages, was published the following year.

Kosmoglott was also a forum for various other planned languages, while still mainly written in Occidental. The name was changed to Cosmoglotta in 1927 as it began to officially promote Occidental in lieu of other languages, and that January the magazine's editorial and administrative office was moved to the Vienna neighborhood of Mauer, now part of Liesing. Much of the early success for Occidental in this period came from the office's new central location, along with the efforts of Engelbert Pigal, also from Austria, whose article Li Ovre de Edgar de Wahl (The Work of Edgar de Wahl) led to interest in Occidental from users of Ido. Use in France began in 1928, and by the beginning of the next decade the Occidental community was established in Germany, Austria, Sweden, Czechoslovakia and Switzerland.

=== Vienna period and World War II ===
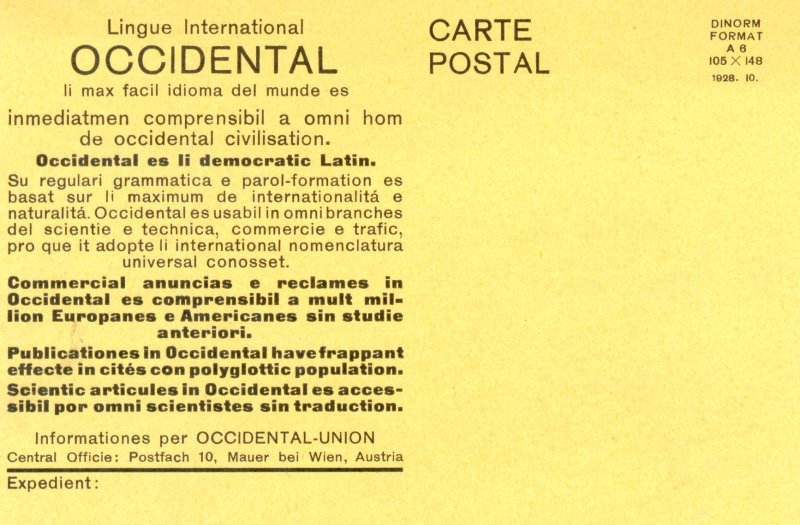
PR postcard with Occidental text created in 1928 in Vienna

The Vienna period was also marked by financial stability. With the help of two major backers, Hanns Hörbiger, also from Vienna, and G.A. Moore from London, Cosmoglotta thrived despite the economic crisis. After the two died in 1931, Cosmoglotta was again forced to rely on revenue from subscriptions and republications.

The growing movement began campaigning more assertively for Occidental in the early 1930s, leveraging its at-sight readability by contacting organizations such as companies, embassies, printing houses and the LON with letters entirely in Occidental that were often understood and answered. Recordings of spoken Occidental on gramophone records for distribution were first made in this period.

The years from 1935 to 1939 were particularly active for Cosmoglotta and a second edition of the journal was published. Originally entitled Cosmoglotta-Informationes, it was soon renamed Cosmoglotta B, focusing on items of more internal interest such as linguistic issues, reports of Occidental in the news, and financial updates. In early 1936, not counting the 110 issues of Cosmoglotta and other journals and bulletins, a total of 80 publications existed in and about Occidental.

But the years before World War II posed difficulties for Occidental and other planned languages. They were banned in Germany, Austria and Czechoslovakia, forced to disband, and kept under surveillance by the Gestapo, which also destroyed instructional materials. The prohibition of auxiliary languages in Germany was particularly damaging as this was where most Occidentalists lived at the time. The inability to accept payment for subscriptions was a financial blow that continued after the war along with Germany's division into zones of influence, not all of which allowed payments.

De Wahl, in Tallinn, was unable to communicate with the Occidental Union in Switzerland from 1939 to October 1947, first due to the war and thereafter the interception of mail between Switzerland and the Soviet Union. Unaware of this, de Wahl was bewildered at the lack of response to his continued letters; even a large collection of poetry translated into Occidental was never delivered. The only letter of his received in Switzerland came in 1947, asking the Occidental Union why it had not answered any of his. Meanwhile, de Wahl's house and his entire library had been destroyed during the bombardment of Tallinn. De Wahl himself was incarcerated for a time after refusing to leave Estonia for Germany, and later took refuge in a psychiatric hospital where he lived out his life.

The outbreak of war in 1939 put a halt to publications of both Cosmoglottas through 1940, but in 1941 Cosmoglotta B began publication once again and continued until 1950. An edition of either Cosmoglotta A or B was published every month between January 1937 and September 1939, and then (after the initial shock of the war) every month from September 1941 to June 1951. During the war, only those in neutral Switzerland and Sweden were able to fully devote themselves to the language, carrying on activities semi-officially.

During the war, Occidentalists noticed that the language was often permitted to be sent by telegram within and outside of Switzerland (especially to and from Sweden) even without official recognition, surmising that censors were able to understand it and may have thought them to be written in Spanish or Romansch (a small yet official Romance language in Switzerland). This allowed some communication to take place between the Occidentalists in Switzerland and Sweden. The other centres of Occidental activity in Europe did not fare as well, with the stocks of study materials in Vienna and Tallinn having been destroyed in bombings and numerous Occidentalists sent to concentration camps in Germany and Czechoslovakia.

Contacts were reestablished shortly after the war by those who remained, with letters from countries such as France, Czechoslovakia, Finland and Great Britain reaching Cosmoglotta. Writers said they were ready to begin activities anew for the language. Cosmoglotta had subscribers in 58 cities in Switzerland a few months before the end of World War II in Europe, and Cosmoglotta A began publication again in 1946.

=== Language standardization ===
During the war many Occidentalists took to standardizing the language. De Wahl had created Occidental with a number of unchangeable features, but believed that its following of the "laws of life" gave it a firm enough base that it could follow a "natural evolution" with a flexibility that would "allow time and practice to take care of modifications that would prove to be necessary". As a result, some words had more than one permissible form, which could not be resolved by decree alone, thus leaving the ultimate decision to the community by including both possible forms in the first Occidental dictionaries. One example concerned the verb scrir (to write) and a possible other form scripter, as both created internationally recognizable derivations: scritura and scritor from scrir, or scriptura and scriptor from scripter. De Wahl expressed a preference for scrir, finding scripter to be somewhat heavy, but commented that the latter was certainly permissible and that Occidental might take on a similar evolution to natural languages in which both forms come into common use, with the longer form having a heavier and formal character and the shorter form a lighter and more everyday tone (such as English story vs. history).

Orthography was another area in which several possibilities existed, namely etymologic orthography (adtractiv, obpression), historic orthography (attractiv, oppression), or simplified orthography (atractiv, opression). The simplified orthography eventually became the standard by 1939. With questions still remaining about the official form of some words and a lack of general material destined for the general public, much time during World War II was spent on language standardization and course creation, and due to the continuing war, in August 1943 the decision was made to create an interim academy to officialize this process.

This process had just about begun not long before the war, and the Swiss Occidentalists, finding themselves isolated from the rest of the continent, opted to concentrate on instructional materials to have ready by the end of the war.

=== IALA, Interlingua, and name change to Interlingue ===
The International Auxiliary Language Association (IALA), founded in 1924 to study and determine the best planned language for international communication, was at first viewed with suspicion by the Occidental community. Its co-founder Alice Vanderbilt Morris was an Esperantist, as were many of its staff, and many Occidentalists including de Wahl himself believed that its leadership under Esperantist William Edward Collinson meant that it had been set up with a staff of professional linguists under a neutral and scientific pretext to bolster a final recommendation for Esperanto. Relations soon improved, however, as it became clear that the IALA intended to be as impartial as possible by familiarizing itself with all existing planned languages. Ric Berger, a prominent Occidentalist who later joined Interlingua in the 1950s, made a personal visit to Morris in 1935 in which she and her husband showed a curiosity for Occidental and invited him to speak in the language, vastly improving Berger's opinion of the organization.

In 1945, the IALA announced that it planned to create its own language and showed four possible versions under consideration, all of which were naturalistic as opposed to schematic. Occidentalists were by and large pleased that the IALA had decided to create a language so similar in nature to Occidental, seeing it as a credible association that gave weight to their argument that an auxiliary language should proceed from study of natural languages instead of attempting to fit them into an artificial system. Ric Berger was particularly positive in describing the upcoming language as a victory for the natural school and "almost the same language" in 1948. Berger still had reservations, however, doubting whether a project with such a similar aspect and structure would be able to "suddenly cause prejudices [against planned languages] to fall and create unity among the partisans of international languages". Berger also feared that it might simply "disperse the partisans of the natural language with nothing to show for it" after Occidental had created "unity in the naturalistic school" for so long.

While the two languages had a 90 per cent identical vocabulary without orthographic differences taken into account (e.g. with filosofie and philosophia considered the same word), structurally and derivationally they were very different. De Wahl's Rule in Occidental had mostly done away with Latin double stem verbs (verbs such as act: ager, act- or send: mitter, miss-), while Interlingua simply accepted them as part and parcel of a naturalistic system. The control languages (Italian, Spanish and/or Portuguese, French, English) used by Interlingua to form its vocabulary for the most part require an eligible word to be found in three source languages (the "rule of three"), which would conflict with Occidental's Germanic substrate and various other words which would be by definition ineligible in a unified language that retained Interlingua's methodology. Interlingua also allowed optional irregular verbal conjugations such as so, son and sia as the first-person singular, third-person plural and subjunctive form of esser, the verb 'to be'.

Occidental was also still recovering from the war. Cosmoglotta continued to report into 1946 on who had survived the war, who among them were ready to participate again and those who were still out of touch. The magazine was financially strained by inflated postwar printing costs and its inability to collect payments from certain countries, a marked contrast to the well-funded New York-based IALA.

International politics was another difficulty for Occidentalists after the war. The beginning of the Cold War created an uncomfortable situation for the Occidental-Union, whose name unfortunately coincided with that of an anti-Russian political league; the Swiss Occidentalists believed that was why all of de Wahl's letters from Tallinn were intercepted. De Wahl remained unaware of developments in the language and the proposal for the rest of his life. In early 1948 the Czechoslovak Occidentalists had begun requesting a new name that would allow them to continue their linguistic activities without suspicion, proposing the name Interal (International auxiliari lingue), to which the union responded that the term Interlingue would be more appropriate and that they were free to introduce the language as "Interlingue (Occidental)", or even remove the mention of Occidental in parentheses if they wanted. Ric Berger began advocating for a change of name from Occidental to Interlingue in 1948 which he also hoped would aid in a fusion between the two languages. The official vote on the name change to Interlingue took place in 1949 and was passed with 91 per cent support, making the official name Interlingue, with Interlingue (Occidental) also permitted, starting September 1949.

The 1951 debut of Interlingua weakened Interlingue-Occidental, which until then had been unchallenged in the field of naturalistic planned auxiliary languages. Vĕra Barandovská-Frank's perception of the situation at the time was as follows (translated from Esperanto):

In the field of naturalistic planned languages Occidental-Interlingue was until then unchallenged (especially after the death of Otto Jespersen, author of Novial), as all new projects were nearly imitations of it. This applied to Interlingua as well, but it carried with it a dictionary of 27 000 words put together by professional linguists that brought great respect, despite in principle only confirming the path that de Wahl had started. [...] In these circumstances the efforts by Ric Berger to move all users of Interlingue en masse to Interlingua de IALA was a shock. His heresy caused doubt and interruptions in Interlingue circles, especially after he became involved in the publication of Revista de Interlingua. The former idea of a natural fusion of both languages was shown to be unrealistic, with the new language becoming a rival.

Don Harlow similarly summarizes the year 1951 for Occidental:

Interlingua had a ready-made constituency. Almost thirty years had passed since the creation of Occidental, whose strength in the "naturalistic" world had prevented other "naturalistic" projects from developing their own movements. But Occidental's star had waned since the war. Now, like a bolt from the blue, came this heaven-sent gift: a new constructed language even more "naturalistic" than Occidental. In spite of attempts by diehard supporters of Occidental to stave off the inevitable — for instance, by such tactics as renaming their language Interlingue — most remaining Occidentalists made the short pilgrimage to the shrine of Interlingua.

=== Stagnation and revival ===
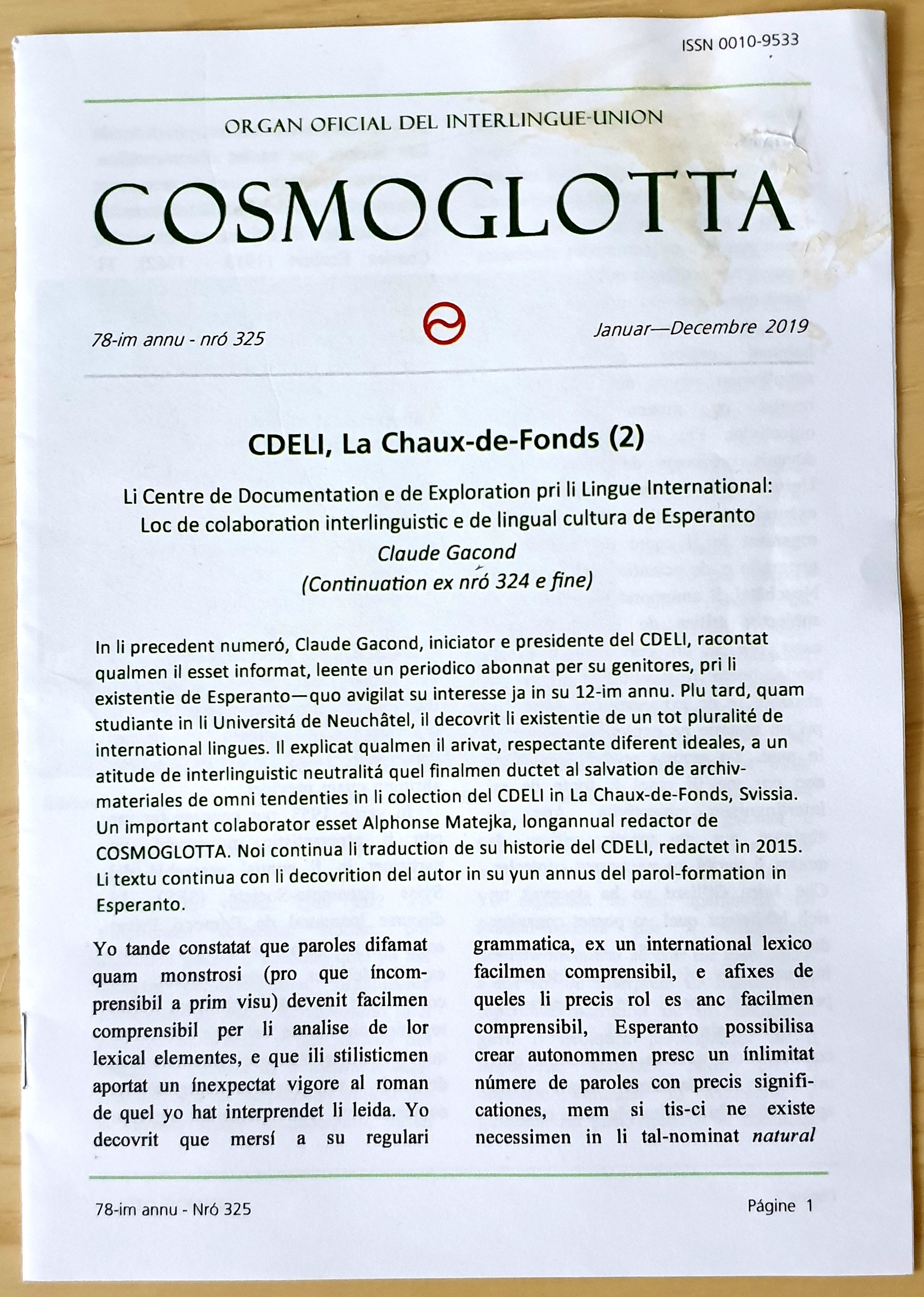
Issue 325 of Cosmoglotta for the period January to December 2019.

While the migration of so many users to Interlingua had severely weakened Interlingue, the ensuing drop in activity was gradual and took place over decades. Cosmoglotta B ceased publication after 1950, and the frequency of Cosmoglotta A began to gradually drop: once every second month from 1952, and then once per quarter from 1963. Other bulletins in Interlingue continued to appear during this time such as Cive del Munde (Switzerland), Voce de Praha (Czechoslovakia), Sved Interlinguist (Sweden), International Memorandum (United Kingdom), Interlinguistic Novas (France), Jurnale Scolari International (France), Buletine Pedagogic International (France), Super li Frontieras (France), Interlingue-Postillon (1958, Germany), Novas de Oriente (1958, Japan), Amicitie european (1959, Switzerland), Teorie e practica (Switzerland-Czechoslovakia, 1967), and Novas in Interlingue (Czechoslovakia, 1971). Barandovská-Frank believed that the ebb in interest in Occidental-Interlingue occurred in concert with the aging of the generation that was first drawn to it from other planned languages:

Most of those interested in Interlingue belonged to the generation that became acquainted in turn with Volapük, Esperanto and Ido, later on finding the most aesthetic (essentially naturalistic) solution in Occidental-Interlingue. Many subsequently moved to IALA's Interlingua, which however did not prove to be much more successful despite the impression its scientific origin made, and those who remained loyal to Occidental-Interlingue did not succeed in imparting their enthusiasm to a new generation.

Activity in Interlingue reached a low during the 1980s and early 1990s, when Cosmoglotta publication ceased for a few years. While issue 269 was published in 1972 after publishing once per season between 1963, issue 289 was not reached until summer 2000 for an average of less than one issue per year. According to Harlow, "in 1985 Occidental's last periodical, Cosmoglotta, ceased publication, and its editor, Mr. Adrian Pilgrim, is quoted as having described Occidental as a 'dead language.'" A decade later, a documentary film in 1994 by Steve Hawley and Steyger on planned languages introduced Interlingue speaker Donald Gasper as "one of the last remaining speakers of the language Occidental".

As was the case for other planned languages, the arrival of the Internet spurred Interlingue's revival. In the year 1999 the first Yahoo! Group in Occidental was founded, Cosmoglotta had begun publishing intermittently again, and the language became a subject of discussion in literature on auxiliary languages. One example is The Esperanto Book released in 1995 by Harlow, who wrote that Occidental had an intentional emphasis on European forms and that some of its leading followers espoused a Eurocentric philosophy, which may have hindered its spread. Still, the opposite view was also common in the community and Occidental gained adherents in many nations including Asian nations. An Interlingue Wikipedia was approved in 2004. In recent years official meetings of Interlingue speakers have resumed: one in Ulm in 2013, another in Munich in 2014 with three participants, and a third in Ulm the next year with five.

The most recent edition of Cosmoglotta is volume 333, for the period from January to June 2024.

Recent years have shown new books published in Interlingue such as The Little Prince, the Gospel of Mark, Salute, Jonathan!, and works including Li sercha in li castelle Dewahl e altri racontas, Antologie hispan, and Fabules, racontas e mites.

== Language philosophy ==
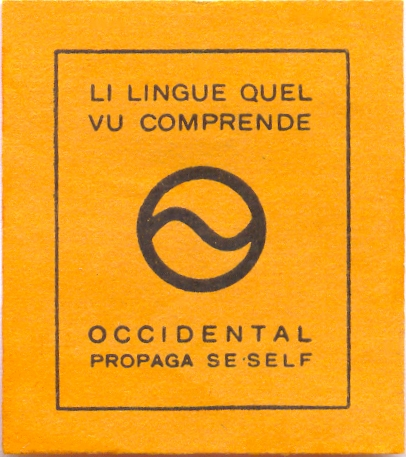
Sticker from 1930 created to emphasize readability at first sight: Li lingue quel vu comprende (The language you understand) and Occidental propaga se self (Occidental promotes itself)

De Wahl was first introduced to planned languages through Volapük, an international auxiliary language released in 1879. De Wahl later became one of the earliest users of Esperanto (la lingvo internacia), which he encountered for the first time in 1888 during his period as a Volapükist and for which he was in the process of composing a dictionary of marine terms. He quickly became a fervent supporter of Esperanto for a number of years in which he collaborated with Zamenhof on some parts of the language's design and translated one of the first works into Esperanto: "Princidino Mary", published in 1889 originally under the name Princino Mary. He remained an Esperantist until 1894 when the vote to reform Esperanto failed; he was one of just two that voted neither for Esperanto unchanged, nor for the reform proposed by Zamenhof, but for a completely new reform. Occidental would not be announced for a full 28 years after de Wahl had abandoned Esperanto, a period in which he spent working with other language creators trying to develop a system that combined naturalism and regularity, a combination that became a frequently referenced selling point in the promotion of Occidental.

Among those de Wahl worked with while developing Occidental were Waldemar Rosenberger (Idiom Neutral), Julius Lott (Mundolingue), and Antoni Grabowski (Modern Latin for a time, before returning to Esperanto). The method sought after by these "partisans of naturalism" was the distillation of existing words into their parts to obtain the international roots within them (such as naturalisation to nat-ur-al-is-ation), then used in other words to keep root words to a minimum while maintaining a natural appearance. This decomposition of existing words gave rise to a large number of affixes. For example, just those used to form nouns referring to a type of person are as follows: -er- (molinero – miller), -or- (redactor – editor), -ari- (millionario – millionaire), -on- (spion, spy), -ard (mentard, liar), -astr- (poetastro, lousy poet), -es (franceso, Frenchman), -essa (reyessa, queen). In de Wahl's opinion it was always preferable to opt for a productive suffix than to be forced to coin new words from completely new radicals later on. In addition to this, de Wahl's rule developed later allowed for regular derivation from double-stem Latin verbs.

The Delegation for the Adoption of an International Auxiliary Language, a body of academics formed to study the problem of an international language and which recommended Esperanto with reforms (leading to the language known as Ido), occurred in 1907 before Occidental was announced. De Wahl thus chose to send a memorandum of principles on which to base an international language, a memorandum which arrived after the committee had already adjourned. It was only noted in passing by Louis Couturat, who was already familiar with de Wahl and his collaborators. The principles stated in the memorandum are listed in a request for the committee to declare:

1. that none of the existing systems are satisfactory;

2. that the international language to construct should be based on international material;

3. that it should have a precise system of formation of words which, by its own rules, obtains words which are truly international;

4. that it should have a natural grammar that produces no unnatural forms;

5. that it should have an international orthography.

De Wahl published in 1922 a modification of Otto Jespersen's principle that "That international language is best which in every point offers the greatest facility to the greatest number", stating that the international language should be easiest for the majority of those "who must apply it", or in other words those that need it in international relations. De Wahl believed that the number of speakers did not always need to be taken into account, particularly in specialized areas such as botany where for example the term Oenethera biennis (a type of plant) should be implemented unchanged in an international language even if the entire world population of botanists, those most often familiar with and likely to use the word, did not exceed 10,000.

This also implied that words belonging to particular cultures should be imported without modifications, which De Wahl believed brought new ideas of value to European culture that had become "sick" after World War I. He cited the terms karma, ko-tau (kowtow), geisha, and mahdí in 1924 as examples of those that should not be put in a "vocalic corset" through obligatory endings (e.g. karmo, koŭtoŭo, gejŝo, madho in Esperanto) when imported into the international language:

Such words, still not large in number, have seen a large increase in the past century, and in the future will grow in exorbitant proportion when, through international communication, the ideas of stable Oriental cultures will inundate and influence the sick Europe, which is now losing its equilibrium. And the more mutilated the words are, the more mutilated will be the ideas that they represent.

In an article on the future development of language, de Wahl wrote in 1927 that due to European dominance in the sciences and other areas Occidental required a form and derivation recognizable to Europeans, but that it should also be fitted with a grammatical structure capable of taking on more analytical, non-derived forms in the future (such as the equivalents of "bake man" for baker or "wise way" for wisdom) if worldwide linguistic trends began to show a preference for them.

De Wahl believed that there was a fine balance to be maintained between schematic regularity versus naturalism in an international language, where too much of the former may be convenient for the early learner but abhorrent for a speaker, and vice versa:

Exceptions are not made to make study more difficult for foreigners, but to make speaking shorter and more fluid [...] It is clear that in this language as the most impersonal, abstract and businesslike one of all, regularity will be greater and more expanded than in all other national and tribal languages and idioms. But it will never be able to attain a total schematism [...] Also here the real solution will be a harmonization of the two contrary principles. It requires the sensitive penetration of the real necessity in the instinct of the international superpopulation."

While primarily Romance in vocabulary, de Wahl opted for a large Germanic substrate which he felt was more expressive for technical and material vocabulary (self, ost (east), svimmar (to swim), moss, etc.), with Romance and Greek vocabulary more appropriate in the derivation of international words (fémina for woman to form feminin, can for dog to form canin (canine), etc.) as well as mental, corporal and natural conceptions. Minor Romance languages such as Ladin, Provençal (Occitan) and Catalan along with creoles were important in the development of Occidental for de Wahl, who wrote as early as 1912 that his language under development was more similar to Provençal than Italian or Spanish. The Swiss magazine Der Landbote made a similar comment while reviewing the language in 1945, commenting humorously that "reading through the few examples of Occidental gives us the impression of a half-learned Catalan by a foreigner who doesn't much understand the grammar."

De Wahl stressed that Occidental's natural appearance did not imply wholesale importation of national expressions and usage, and warned that doing so would lead to chaos. One of his articles on this subject was directed toward English and French users who he believed incorrectly saw Occidental as a mix of the two: "(Occidental's chaotic appearance) is not the fault of Occidental itself, but rather that of its users and especially the French and English, or those that think that the international language should be a mixture of those two languages [...] that is a fundamental error, especially if these forms present exceptions and irregularities in Occidental's system." Alphonse Matejka wrote in Cosmoglotta that de Wahl "always claimed a minimum of autonomy for his language and bitterly fought against all propositions that intended to augment the naturalism of the language only by blindly imitating the Romance languages, or as de Wahl said crudely in one of his letters to me, 'by aping French or English'".

Occidental's erring on the side of regularity led to vocabulary that was still recognizable but different from the international norm, such as ínpossibil in place of impossibil (ín + poss + ibil), scientic (scientific, from scient-ie + -ic), and descrition (description, from descri-r + -tion). This is one of the greatest differences between it and Interlingua, which has a vocabulary taken from so-called 'prototypes' (the most recent common ancestor to its source languages) while Interlingue/Occidental focused on active, spontaneous derivation. Vocabulary was deemed technically permissible even if it did not match forms in other living languages, with these derived words described as "forms that living languages would have been able to produce using their own means".

=== Vocabulary ===
Though seemingly favourable to the Romance language family, de Wahl did not see Occidental as a Romance language and did not tolerate any nationalism or chauvinism in the choice of words for the language. His opinion on justice in the choice of vocabulary was that: "However many special, new, significant words each «culture» has respectively added to the common human culture, that much they receive." In an article entitled "International o Romanic" (International or Romance) in 1929, he gave examples from a number of categories in which particular languages had a particularly large influence. Those included Greek for science and philosophy (teorema, teosofie, astronomie), Latin for politics and law (social, republica, commission), Scandinavian, Dutch and English for navigation (log, fregatte, mast, brigg, bote), and various other international vocabulary originating in other languages (sabat, alcohol, sultan, divan, nirvana, orang-utan, bushido, té, dalai-lama, cigar, jazz, zebra, bumerang, etc.).

=== Symbol ===
The symbol of Occidental and its dimensions were chosen in 1936 after some deliberation and many other proposed symbols that included stylized letters, a star (as in Esperanto and Ido), a setting sun to represent the sun in the west (the Occident), a globe, and more. The tilde, already used by the Occidental-Union, was eventually selected based on five criteria: symbolic character, simplicity, originality, unlikeliness to be confused with another symbol, and for being bichromatic (having two colours) as opposed to polychromatic. Beyond the five criteria, the Occidentalists at the time referenced the advantages of the lack of a fixed meaning for the tilde in the public sphere, and its similarity to a waveform, implying speech.

== Linguistic features ==
=== Orthography ===
Interlingue is written with 26 Latin letters: a, b, c, d, e, f, g, h, i, j, k, l, m, n, o, p, q, r, s, t, u, v, w, x, y, and z. The names of the letters are a, be, ce, de, e, ef, ge, ha, i, jot, ka, el, em, en, o, pe, qu, er, es, te, u, ve, duplic ve, ix, ypsilon, and zet. Accents are written on the five vowels to indicate irregular stress, with the acute accent (á é í ó ú) preferred, but others (è, ê, etc.) permitted.

=== Phonology ===
==== Vowels ====
Sources on the pronunciations of the vowels are contradictory. Some say that the vowels have their Continental values (that is, [a e i o u]), others that they have different qualities when long and short; they also differ on the number of diphthongs (e.g. au eu ay ey). Earlier texts on Occidental described seven vowels (the five continental vowels plus y like [y], namely French u or German ü, and eu as German ö), but by the 1940s the official recommendation was that vocalic y be pronounced like i and eu as a diphthong instead of ö. Rough English equivalents for the vowels are as follows:

- a as in French, German, Spanish or Italian, or English father.
- e open or closed, as German, Spanish or Italian, or English bed and yes.
- i as French, German, Spanish and Italian, or English machine.
- o open or closed as in French, German, Spanish and Italian, or English door.
- u as in German, Spanish and Italian, or English rule, pull. U after q is a short, almost consonantal (w).
- y is a consonant after a vowel or beginning a word before a vowel, otherwise is pronounced as i.

Interlingue has non-obligatory vowel length. Rough English equivalents of the sounds are as follows:

- short a is /æ/ as in "pat"
- short e is /ɛ/ as in "pet"
- short i is /ɪ/ as in "pit"
- short o is /ɒ/ as in "pot"
- short u is /ʊ/ as in "put"

Vowels are short in the following cases:

1. Vowels are short in unstressed syllables (Accented vowels tend to be long: e in idé, o in sonori, a in dramatic)
2. Vowels are short when followed by two consonants (unless the second consonant is r or l, a preceding stressed vowel is long)
3. Vowels before a final c, ch or x
4. Vowels in short grammatical particles tend to be short

Examples of long vowels: pur, robe, blu, fibre, table.

Examples of short vowels: calm, old, potte, flagga, mann, fox, storc, in, it.

==== Consonants ====
| | | Labial | Alveolar | | Post-alveolar | Palatal | Velar | Glottal |
| | | Labial | plain | sib. | Post-alveolar | Palatal | Velar | Glottal |
|---|---|---|---|---|---|---|---|---|
| Nasal | | m | n | | | | ŋ | |
| Plosive/ affricate | fortis | p | t | t͡s | | | k | |
| Plosive/ affricate | lenis | b | d | d͡z | | | ɡ | |
| Fricative | fortis | f | | s | ʃ | | | h |
| Fricative | lenis | v | | z | ʒ | | | h |
| Approximant | | | l | | r | j | w | |

The consonants are pronounced as in English, with the following exceptions:

- c when before e and i = [ts]: cive, helice, and otherwise as [k]
- g when before e and i = [ʒ], French j, or English s in pleasure: plage, giraffe; but elsewhere c and g are hard as in can, go
- ss = [s] as in pass
- s between vowels = [z]: rose, positiv
- z = [dz]
- zz = [ts]
- ch = [ʃ], English sh: chambre
- j = [ʒ], French j, or English s in pleasure
- t as [t], except when followed by ia, io, iu, or ie and not preceded by an s. Thus the t in nation is pronounced [ts] but in bastion as [t].

Other doubled consonants are pronounced as a single consonant, unless when separated they would be pronounced differently. Ex. grammatica is pronounced as if written gramatica, but acceptar and suggestion are pronounced as if written as ac followed by ceptar, and sug followed by gestion.

=== Stress ===
Words are generally stressed on the vowel before the final consonant: intercalar, parol, forme. Pluralizing a noun does not change the stress: paroles, formes. The endings -bil, -ic, -im, -ul and -um do not change the stress (even when more than one is present in a single word), nor does the adverbial ending -men: rapidmen, duplic, bonissim, singul, possibil, maximum, statisticas. Two vowels together are diphthongized and do not count as two syllables for the purpose of stress: familie, potentie, unless the word is a single consonant or consonant cluster followed by two vowels: die, deo. Compound words are stressed based on the last word in the compound: hodie, substrae. In cases where the accent is irregular, it is indicated by an accent: café, ínpossibil, numeró, númere, felicitá. The accent mark may also be used for emphasis as needed: Yó ea con la (ne tú).

=== Grammar ===
==== Articles ====
Like English, Interlingue has definite and an indefinite articles. The definite article (the) is li, and the indefinite (a, an) is un. Plural of a noun is made by adding -s after a vowel, or -es after most consonants. To avoid pronunciation and stress changes, words ending in -c, -g, and -m only add an -s: un libre, du libres, li tric, li trics, li plug, li plugs, li album, pluri albums.

The ending of the definite article can be modified to lo (masculine), la (feminine), lu (neuter), lis (plural), los (masculine plural), e las (feminine plural). The article itself can also be pluralized before words that are difficult to pluralize on their own: lis s (the s's).

==== Personal pronouns ====
Interlingue has two forms for the personal pronouns: one for the subject form (nominative), and one for the object form (accusative or dative, i.e. the oblique form):

| | | Subject | | Object | | Possessive | |
| | | Singular | Plural | Singular | Plural | Singular | Plural |
|---|---|---|---|---|---|---|---|
| 1st | | yo | noi | me | nos | mi | nor |
| 2nd | | tu | vu | te | vos | tui | vor |
| 3d | masculine | il | illos | le | los | su | lor |
| 3d | feminine | ella | ellas | la | las | su | lor |
| 3d | neutral | it | ili | it | les | su | lor |

The formal second person is vu, which is also the second person plural. The indefinite personal pronoun "one" is on. One can also specify the gender of third person plural by using illos (masculine) or ellas (feminine).

==== Grammatical endings ====
Only a few parts of speech in Interlingue (such as verbs in the infinitive) have entirely obligatory endings, while many other endings are optional though sometimes recommended. Some grammatical endings are:

- ar, er, ir: verb infinitive. far (to do), posser (be able), scrir (to write)
- e: the general substantival (noun) ending. Used obligatorily to differentiate nouns from other parts or speech, for reasons of pronunciation, or optionally for euphony.
- i: the general adjectival ending, similar to -e in usage.
- a: nouns that end in e formed from an -ar verb are often written with the -a ending if one wishes to emphasize the verbal (active) aspect. The a ending also makes nouns feminine: anglese (English person), angleso (Englishman), anglesa (English woman). This does not apply to nouns that on their own indicate the gender (patre, matre).
- o: indicates the masculine gender in the same way a indicates the feminine.

==== Correlatives ====
While correlatives were not made to match a pre-determined scheme (such as the correlatives in Esperanto), the majority match the prefixes and suffixes in the chart below.

| | QU- (interrogative/relative) | T- (demonstrative) | ALQU- (undefined) | NEQU- (negative) | -CUNC (indeterminate) | Ø (collective) |
|---|---|---|---|---|---|---|
| -I (persons, standard demonstrative) | qui (who) | ti (this/that) | alqui (someone) | nequi (nobody) | quicunc (whoever) | omni (every) |
| -O (things) | quo (what) | to (that) | alquo (something) | nequo (nothing) | quocunc (whatever) | omno (all) |
| -EL (both persons and things) | quel (which) | tel (such) | alquel (any) | nequel | quelcunc (whichever) | chascun (each) |
| -AL (quality) | qual (which, what a) | tal (that) | alqual (any kind) | nequal | qualcunc | |
| -AM (way, mode) | quam (as) | tam (so) | alquam (anyhow) | nequam | quamcunc (however) | |
| -ANT (quantity) | quant (how many) | tant (so much) | alquant (somewhat) | nequant | quantcunc | |
| -ANDE (time) | quande (when) | tande (then) | alquande | nequande (never) | quandecunc | sempre (always) |
| -U (place) | u (where) | ci / ta (here / there) | alcu (somewhere) | necu (nowhere) | ucunc (anywhere) | partú (everywhere) |

Notes on the correlatives:

Alcun (some) and necun (no, none) are respectively the adjectives of alquel and nequel.

The -al series is adverbialized with the -men ending: qualmen (how) talmen (that way).

Correlatives can take the plural ending: queles, quales, tis, omnis, etc.

Ci (here) and ta (there) can be affixed to ti and to to indicate proximity or distance: ti libre (this book), ti-ci libre (this book here), ti-ta libre (that book there), tis (these), tis-ci (these here), tis-ta (those there), to-ci (this here), to-ta (that there).

Many derivatives are formed from the correlatives: qualitá from qual + -itá, quantitá from quant + -itá, omnipotent from omni + potent.

==== Verbs ====
Verbs in Interlingue have three endings: -ar, -er, and -ir. Conjugation is performed with a combination of endings and auxiliary verbs. The verb esser (to be) is exceptional in being written es in the present tense, while the esse form is the imperative.

Simple Verb Tenses
| | Form | Interlingue | English | Notes |
|---|---|---|---|---|
| Infinitive | -ar / -er / -ir | amar / decider / scrir | to love / to decide / to write | |
| Present | -a / -e / -i | yo ama / decide / scri | I love / decide / write | |
| Past | -t | yo amat / decidet / scrit | I loved / decided / wrote | stress thus falls on the last syllable: yo amat |
| Future | va + INF | yo va amar / decider / scrir | I will love / decide / write | va on its own is not a verb (to go = ear or vader) |
| Conditional | vell + INF | yo vell amar / decider / scrir | I would love / decide / write | Also used for hearsay: Un acusation secun quel il vell... transl. An accusation alleging him to have... lit. 'an accusation according to which he would have...' |
| Imperative | -a! / -e! / -i! | ama! / decide! / scri! | love! / decide! / write! | Imperative of esser is esse. |

Compound Verb Tenses
| | Form | Interlingue | English | Notes |
|---|---|---|---|---|
| Perfect | ha + -t | yo ha amat | I have loved | ha on its own is not a verb (to have = haver) |
| Pluperfect | hat + -t | yo hat amat | I had loved | |
| Future perfect | va har + -t | yo va har amat | I will have loved | |
| Perfect conditional | vell har + -t | yo vell har amat | I would have loved | |
| Future in the past | vat + INF | yo vat amar | I was going to love | |
| Precative | ples + INF | ples amar! | please love! | |
| Hortative | lass + INF | lass nos amar! | let us love! | |
| Optative | mey + INF | yo mey amar | may I love | Same as English may in the optative mood (as in May the Force be with you). |
| Present participle | -nt | amant | loving | -ir verbs become -ient |
| Gerund (adverbial participle) | -nte | amante | (while) loving | -ir verbs become -iente |

The present participle is used to qualify nouns: un cat ama (transl. a cat loves), un amant cat (transl. a loving cat) and is often seen in adjectives such as fatigant (tiring, from fatigar, to tire). The gerund is used to indicate another action or state of being going on at the same time: scriente un missage, yo videt que... (transl. writing a message, I saw that...).

==== Adverbs ====
Interlingue has primary adverbs and derived adverbs. Primary adverbs are not generated from other parts of speech and are thus not formed using any special endings: tre (very), sempre (always), etc.

Derived adverbs are formed by adding the suffix -men to an adjective (rapid = quick, rapidmen = quickly) Adjectives may be used as adverbs when the sense is clear:

Il ha bon laborat = He has worked well ("He has worked good")

Noi serchat long = We looked for a long time ("We searched long")

==== Derivation ====
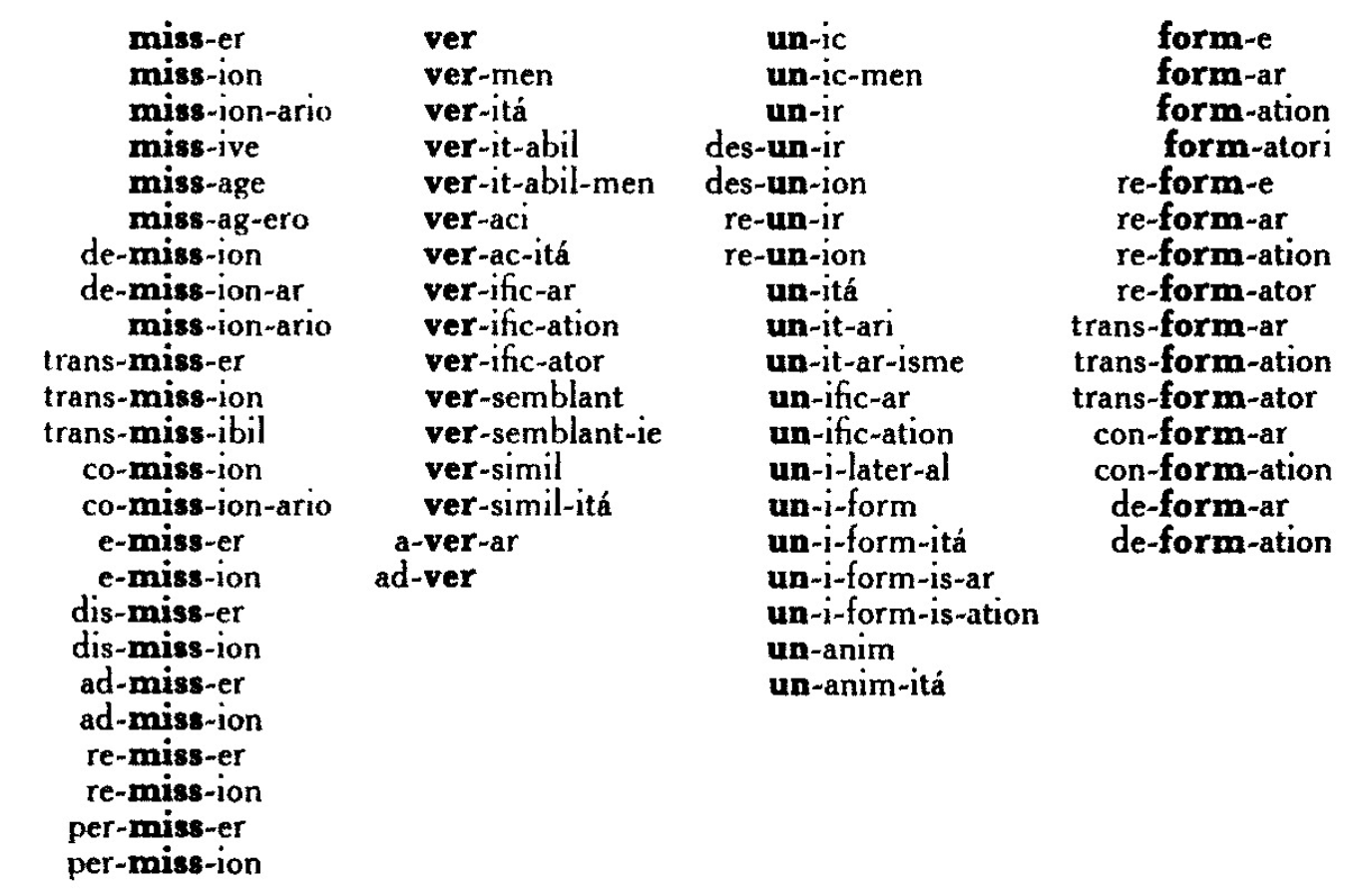
An example of derivation from the magazine Cosmoglotta.

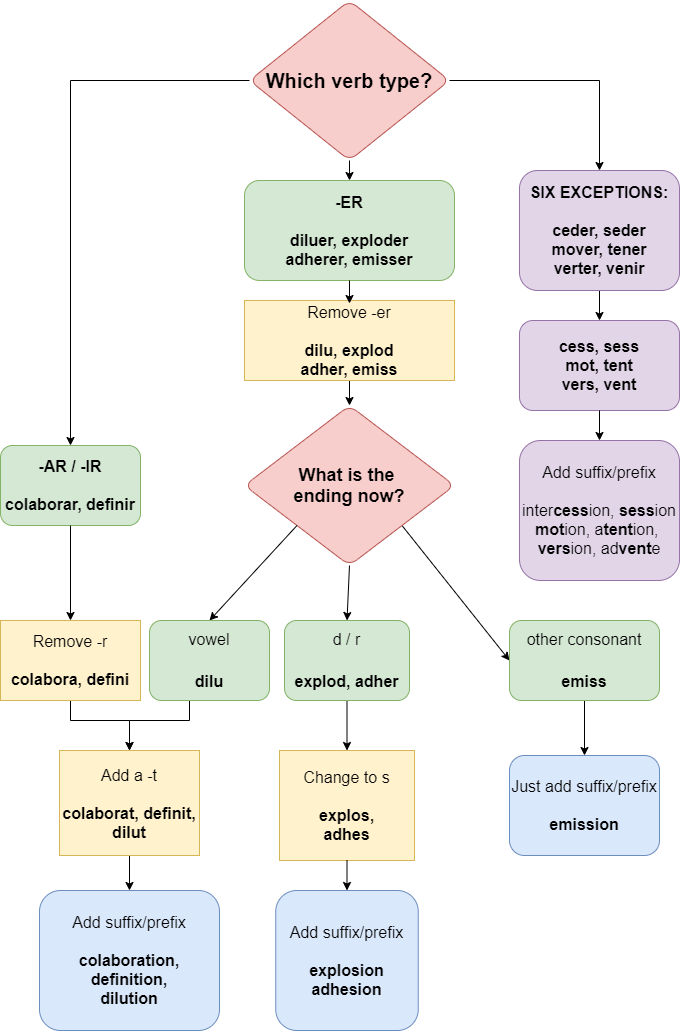
Flowchart demonstrating derivation of nouns from verbs using de Wahl's rule.

The application of de Wahl's rule to verbs, and the usage of numerous suffixes and prefixes, was created to resolve irregularities that had plagued creators of language projects before Occidental, who were forced to make the choice between regularity and unnatural forms, or irregularity and natural forms. The prevailing view before its application was that natural forms needed to be sacrificed for the sake of regularity, while those that opted for naturalism were forced to admit numerous irregularities when doing so (Idiom Neutral for example had a list of 81 verbs with special radicals used when forming derivatives), a paradox summed up by Louis Couturat in 1903 as follows:

In short, one finds oneself confronted by the antinomy that the words that are international are not regular, and the words that are regular are not international; the prevailing opinion [of naturalists such as Julius Lott and de Wahl] was that regularity should be sacrificed for internationality in the formation of words.

The rules created by de Wahl to resolve this were first described in 1909 in the Discussiones of Peano's Academia pro Interlingua and are as follows:

1. If, after the removal of -r or -er of the infinitive, the root ends in a vowel, the final -t is added. Crear (to create), crea/t-, crea/t/or, crea/t/ion, crea/t/iv, crea/t/ura.
2. If the root ends in consonants d or r, they are changed into s: decid/er (to decide), deci/s-, deci/s/ion deci/s/iv. Adherer (to adhere), adhe/s-, adhe/s/ion
3. In all other cases, with six exceptions, the removal of the ending gives the exact root: duct/er, duct-, duct/ion.

Once these rules were applied, Occidental was left with six exceptions. They are:

1. ced/er, cess- (concession)
2. sed/er, sess- (session)
3. mov/er, mot- (motion)
4. ten/er, tent- (temptation)
5. vert/er, vers- (version)
6. veni/r, vent- (advent)

Suffixes are added either to the verbal root or the present theme of the verb (the infinitive minus -r). An example of the latter is the suffix -ment: move/r, move/ment (not movetment), experi/r, experi/ment (not experitment), and -ntie (English -nce): tolera/r (tolerate), tolera/ntie, existe/r (exist), existe/ntie.

==== Affixes ====
The major prefixes and suffixes used in word derivation in Interlingue are added to either the present theme (infinitive minus -r), verbal root (infinitive minus two preceding vowels), or perfect theme (present theme + t or +s for verbs finishing with -d or -r) of verbs, as well as other types of speech. Some of the affixes used are:

| affix | meaning | before affix | after affix |
|---|---|---|---|
| -abil/-ibil | able | posser (to be able) | possibil (possible) |
| -ada/-ida | -ade | promenar (to stroll) | promenada (a walk, a promenade) |
| -ar | general verb | sicc (dry) | siccar (to dry) |
| bel- | kinship by marriage | fratre (brother) | belfratre (brother-in-law) |
| des- | cessation | infectar (infect) | desinfectar (disinfect) |
| dis- | separation, dispersion | membre (member) | dismembrar (dismember) |
| -er- | doer of verb | lavar (wash) | lavere / lavera / lavero (washer) |
| -ette | diminutive | dom (house) | domette (cottage) |
| ex- | ex- | presidente (president) | ex-presidente (ex-president) |
| ho- | this | semane (week) | ho-semane (this week) |
| ín- | in-, un-, etc. | credibil (believable) | íncredibil (unbelievable) |
| -ion | -ion | crear (create) | creation (creation) |
| -iv | -ive | exploder (explode) | explosiv (explosive) |
| -ment | -ment | experir (to experience) | experiment (experiment) |
| mi- | half | fratre (brother) | mifratre (half-brother) |
| mis- | false (mis-) | comprender (understand) | miscomprender (misunderstand) |
| non- | non- | fumator (smoker) | nonfumator (non-smoker) |
| -ntie | -nce | tolerar (tolerate) | tolerantie (tolerance) |
| -or | -er, -or | distribuer (distribute) | distributor (distributor) |
| -ori | -ory | currer (run) | cursori (cursory) |
| per- | through, all the way | forar (pierce) | perforar (perforate) |
| pre- | before | historie (history) | prehistorie (prehistory) |
| pro- | to the front | ducter (lead) | producter (produce) |
| re- | re- | venir (come) | revenir (return) |
| step- | step- | matre (mother) | stepmatre (stepmother) |
| -ura | -ure | scrir (write) | scritura (scripture) |

== Ease of learning ==
As an international auxiliary language, ease of learning through regular derivation and recognizable vocabulary was a key principle in Occidental's creation. Cosmoglotta often featured letters from new users and former users of other international languages (primarily Esperanto and Ido) attesting to the language's simplicity. New users demonstrated their quick command of the language, and experienced auxiliary language users shared their experiences. Because many users of the language had encountered it after first learning Esperanto, data on learnability of the language for those without experience in other international auxiliary languages is scarce. One experiment to ascertain learning time was carried out in the years 1956 to 1957 in a Swiss Catholic high school (gymnasium) in Disentis on the time required to learn the language. The experiment showed that the students participating in the study, who had previous experience with French, Latin, and Greek, mastered both written and spoken Interlingue after 30 hours of study.

== Interlingue literature ==
Some original texts published as separate books are:

- Krasina, raconta del subterrania del Moravian carst, published in 1938 by Jan Amos Kajš.
- Li astres del Verne, a collection of original poetry by Jaroslav Podobský, published both in 1935 and 1947.

== Example texts ==
Li material civilisation, li scientie, e mem li arte unifica se plu e plu. Li cultivat europano senti se quasi in hem in omni landes queles have europan civilisation, it es, plu e plu, in li tot munde. Hodie presc omni states guerrea per li sam armes. Sin cessa li medies de intercomunication ameliora se, e in consequentie de to li terra sembla diminuer se. Un Parisano es nu plu proxim a un angleso o a un germano quam il esset ante cent annus a un paisano frances.

Possible pronunciation: [li mateˈrjaːl tsivilizaˈtsjoːn li ˈstsjentsje e ˈmeːm li ˈarte uˈniːfika se ˈpluː e ˈpluː li kultiˈvaːt ewroˈpaːno ˈsenti se ˈkwaːzi in ˈheːm in ˈomni ˈlandes ˌkweːles ˈhaːve ewroˈpaːn tsivilizaˈtsjoːn it ˈes ˈpluː e ˈpluː in li ˈtoːt ˈmunde hoˈdiːe ˈprɛsk ˈomni ˈstaːtes ˈgwɛrea per li ˈsaːm ˈarmes sin ˈtsɛsa li ˈmeːdjes de interkomunikaˈtsjoːn ameˈljoːra se e in konseˈkwentsje de ˈtoː li ˈtɛra ˈsembla dimiˈnweːr se un pariˈzaːno es ˈnuː plu ˈprɔksim a un aŋˈgleːzo o a un ʒerˈmaːno kwam il eˈseːt ˌante ˈtsent ˈanus a un pa.iˈzaːno franˈtseːs]

Translation: "Material civilization, science, and even art unify themselves more and more. The educated European feels himself almost at home in all lands that have European civilization, that is, more and more, in the entire world. Today almost all states war with the same armaments. Without pause the modes of intercommunication improve, and in consequence from that the world seems to decrease. A Parisian is now closer to an Englishman or a German than he was a hundred years before to a French peasant."

1942 New Year's greeting printed in Cosmoglotta B (Switzerland)
| Interlingue | English |
|---|---|
| Si noi vell viver ancor in li felici témpor quel precedet li guerre universal, tande anc li present articul vell reflecter li serenitá per quel noi acustomat salutar li comensa de un nov annu. Ma hodie, li pie desir quel noi ordinarimen expresse per un cordial 'Felici nov annu' ha transformat se in sanguant ironie. Noi plu ne posse pronunciar ti paroles sin sentir lor terribil banalitá e absolut vacuitá de sens. Li future es obscurissim e it promesse nos plu mult sufrenties quam radies de espera. Li pace va sequer li guerre quam li die seque li nocte e quam li calma succede al tempeste. Un nov munde va nascer ex li caos e in ti nov munde anc noi interlinguistes va ti-ci vez luder un rol decisiv. | If we were to still be living in the happy time that preceded the world war, then this article would also reflect the serenity by which we used to greet the beginning of a new year. But today, the pious desire that we ordinarily express with a cordial 'Happy new year' has been transformed into bloody irony. We can no longer pronounce these words without feeling their terrible banality and absolute lack of meaning. The future is beyond dark and it promises us more suffering than rays of hope. Peace will follow war, just as the day follows the night and the calm comes after the storm. A new world will be born out of the chaos, and in this new world this time we interlinguists will also play a decisive role. |

== See also ==
- Interlinguistics (theoretical framework)
- List of interlingue-ists and Occidentalists
- List of journals and bulletins in Occidental
- Comparison between Interlingue and Interlingua
- Li Europan lingues
