= Li Europan lingues =

Placeholder text in Interlingue

Li Europan lingues ([li ewroˈpaːn ˈliŋgwes]) is a quotation in Occidental (Interlingue), an international auxiliary language devised by Edgar von Wahl in 1922. It is used in some HTML templates as a fill-in or placeholder text.

== Text ==
When used as placeholder text, Li Europan lingues is usually one or two paragraphs and reads as follows:

Li Europan lingues es membres del sam familie. Lor separat existentie es un myth. Por scientie, musica, sport etc, litot Europa usa li sam vocabular. Li lingues differe solmen in li grammatica, li pronunciation e li plu commun vocabules. Omnicos directe al desirabilite de un nov lingua franca: On refusa continuar payar custosi traductores.

At solmen va esser necessi far uniform grammatica, pronunciation e plu commun paroles. Ma quande lingues coalesce, li grammatica del resultant lingue es plu simplic e regulari quam ti del coalescent lingues. Li nov lingua franca va esser plu simplic e regulari quam li existent Europan lingues. It va esser tam simplic quam Occidental in fact, it va esser Occidental. A un Angleso it va semblar un simplificat Angles, quam un skeptic Cambridge amico dit me que Occidental es.

English translation

The European languages are members of the same family. Their separate existence is a myth. For science, music, sport, etc, Europe uses the same vocabulary. The languages only differ in their grammar, their pronunciation and their most common words. Everyone realizes why a new common language would be desirable: one could refuse to pay expensive translators.

To achieve this, it would be necessary to have uniform grammar, pronunciation and more common words. If several languages coalesce, the grammar of the resulting language is more simple and regular than that of the individual languages. The new common language will be more simple and regular than the existing European languages. It will be as simple as Occidental; in fact, it will be Occidental. To an English person, it will seem like simplified English, as a skeptical Cambridge friend of mine told me that Occidental is.

== History and discovery of Li Europan lingues text ==
The original text of Li Europan lingues comes from an article written in 1933 for the journal Cosmoglotta entitled Occidental es inevitabil (Occidental is inevitable), in which S.W. Beer from the universities of London and Cambridge wrote a letter explaining that he supported the language for practical reasons because he believed it would inevitably become Europe's lingua franca.

The text of Li Europan lingues is found in many HTML templates and through copying and uploading of templates this phrase seems to have found its use in many websites.

Don Harlow posted a message to the Auxlang List on 5 August 2006, mentioning its appearance in the "CSS Cookbook" from O'Reilly by Christopher Schmitt, and in templates of webpages which implement CSS.

== See also ==
- Lorem ipsum
- The quick brown fox jumps over the lazy dog
