= Kõmmaste =

Village in Estonia

Coordinates: 59°13′N 24°03′E

- Village
- Interactive map of Kõmmaste
- Country: Estonia
- County: Harju County
- Parish: Lääne-Harju Parish
- Time zone: UTC+2 (EET)
  - Summer (DST): UTC+3 (EEST)

Kõmmaste is a village in Lääne-Harju Parish, Harju County in northern Estonia.
