= Pasigraphy =

Writing system wherein each symbol represents a concept

Basic Blissymbols.

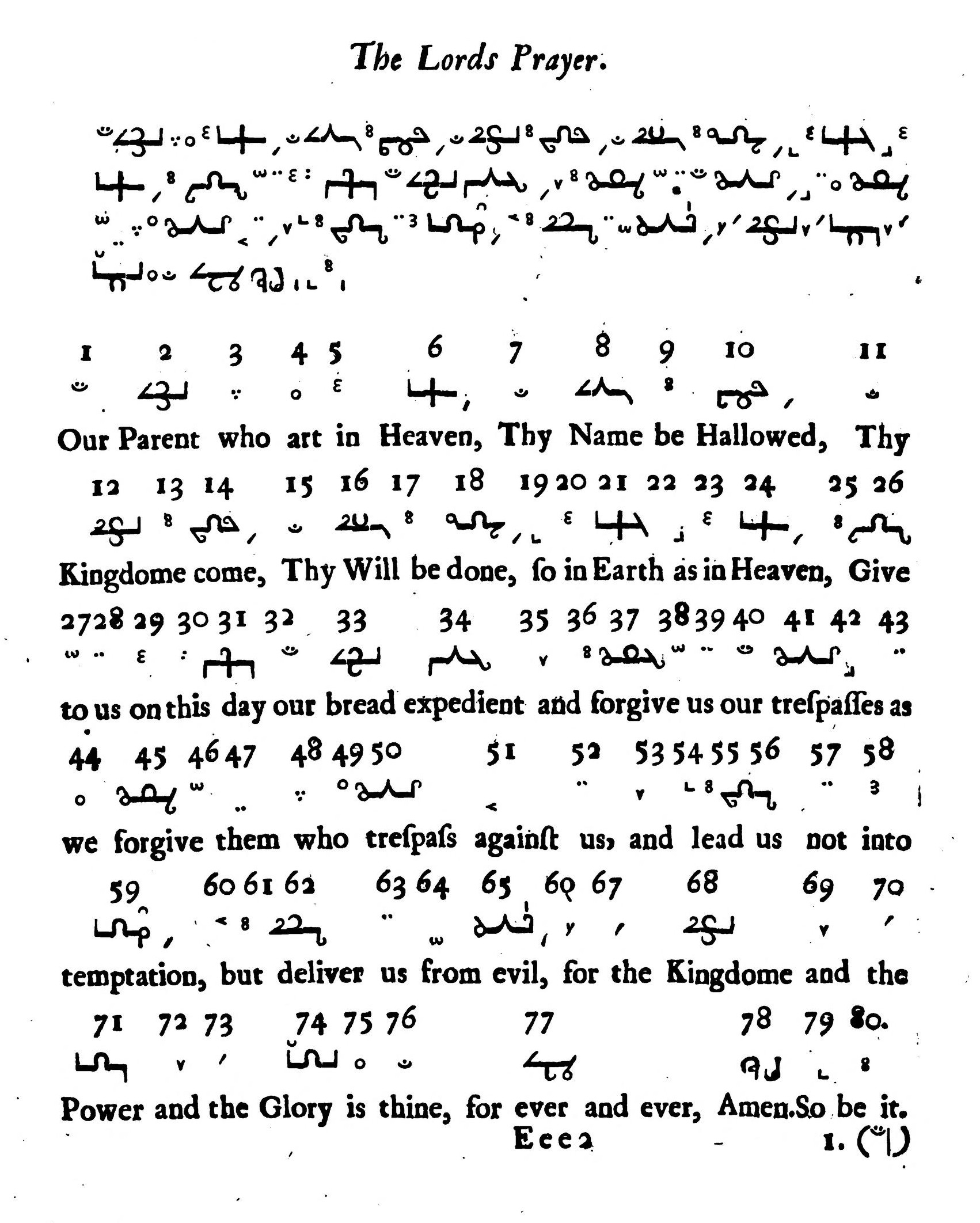
The Lord's Prayer in John Wilkins's Real Character.

A pasigraphy (from Greek πᾶσι pasi "to all" and γράφω grapho "to write") is a writing system where each written symbol represents a concept (rather than or not just a word or sound or series of sounds in a spoken language).

The aim is to be intelligible to persons of all languages. The term was first applied to a system proposed in 1796, though a number of pasigraphies had been devised prior to that; Leopold Einstein reviews 60 attempts at creating an international auxiliary language, the majority of the 17th–18th century projects being pasigraphies of one kind or another, and several pasigraphies and auxiliary languages, including some sample texts, are also reviewed in Arika Okrent's book on constructed languages. Leibniz wrote about the alphabet of human thought and Alexander von Humboldt corresponded with Peter Stephen Du Ponceau who proposed a universal phonetic alphabet.

Examples of pasigraphies include Blissymbols, Real Character, IConji and Yerkish.

== See also ==
- Cave Beck
- Constructed language
- Emoji
- Engineered language
- Ideogram
- Jacob Linzbach
- Joseph de Maimieux
- Philosophical language
