= De Wahl's rule =

Rules for inflection

De Wahl's rule is a rule of word formation, developed by Baltic German naval officer and teacher Edgar de Wahl and applied in the constructed language Interlingue, which was also his creation.

The rule served for the formation of certain changed grammatical forms, like adjectives and nouns, from verb infinitive.

Edgar de Wahl observed existing patterns of sound changes that occurred in natural languages (d or r to s, etc.). The purpose of his rule was to distill these patterns into a regular and logical system that is reproducible yet also natural in appearance.

== Rule ==
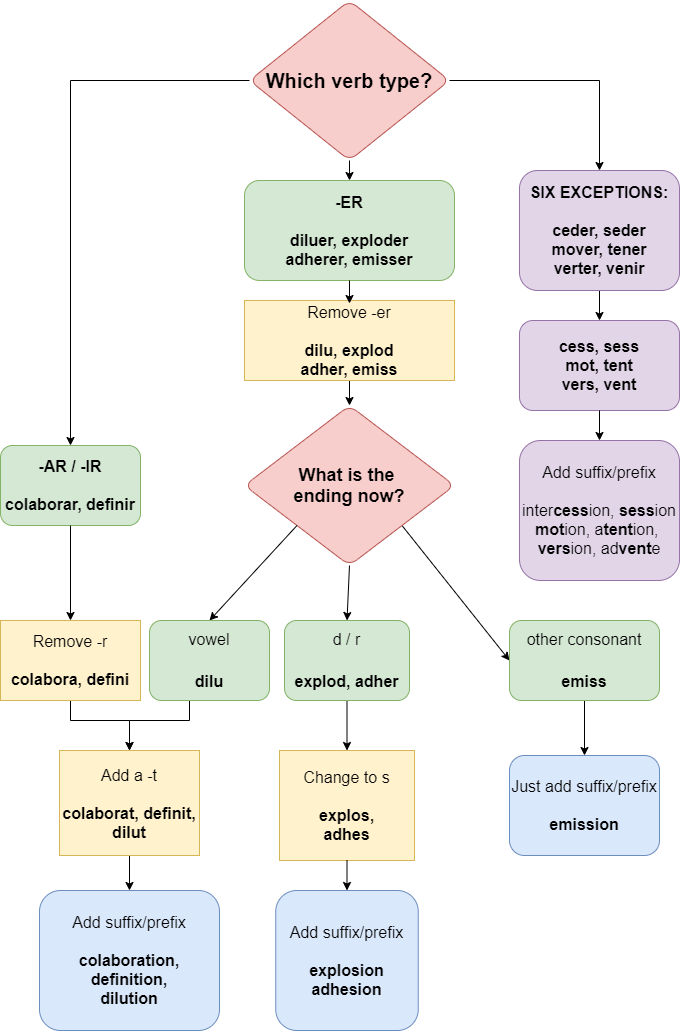

Verb infinitives in Interlingue end in -ar, -ir or -er. The root is obtained by the following way:

1. If, after the removal of -r or -er of the infinitive, the root ends in a vowel, the final -t is added: crea/r, crea/t-, crea/t/or; peti/r, peti/t-, peti/t/ion.
2. If the root ends in consonants d or r, they are changed into s: decid/er, deci/s-, deci/s/ion; adher/er, adhe/s, adhe/sion; elid/er, eli/s-, eli/s/ion.
3. In all other cases, with six exceptions, the removal of the ending gives the exact root: duct/er, duct-, duct/ion; emiss/er, emiss-, emiss/ion.

These six exceptions are

1. ced/er, cess-
2. sed/er, sess-
3. mov/er, mot-
4. ten/er, tent-
5. vert/er, vers-
6. veni/r, vent-

and the verbs formed out of them using prefixes.

Because the rule is actually made of three parts, it also known as the "three rules of de Wahl".

The nouns and adjectives are created by removing the ending and thus obtaining the root. After adding -r or -er, one obtains the infinitive in the majority of cases: decora/t/ion, decora/t-, decora/r.

== Application ==
This rule is used in the constructed languages Interlingue and Sambahsa.

== History ==
De Wahl devised the rule during development of his auxiliary language called Auli (shorthand for Auxiliar Lingue International), which was an early version of Occidental. In 1909 in the magazine of Peano's Acamedia pro Interlingua, Discussiones de Academia, de Wahl classified verbs into static and dynamic with different derivation.

In 1911 in Lingua International de Wahl kept his division of verbs into two classes, but also presented actually modern rule of derivation:

In 1911 (Lingua Intern. No.1, p.19-20) Mr de W. again takes the division of verbs into static and dynamic and continues:

The static verbs form abstract verbal nouns from present participle by addition of the general abstract suffix -ie e.g.: essentie, consistentie, restantie, perseverantie, provenientie, etc.

The dynamic verbs create their derivatives from a separate form called supine. To find the supine of verbs one removes the final -er or -r (if they end with -ar or -ir).

1) If the remaining part ends with a vowel, one adds t: e.g. ama-r, amat; fini-r, finit; secu-er, secut, statu-er, statut; extra-er; extrat; mo-er, mot.

2) If the final consonant of remaining part is d or r, the whole termination is changed into s: e.g. vid-er - vis; erod-er - eros; evad-er - evas; curr-er - curs;

3) In all other cases, the remaining part is the supine; e.g.: corrupt-er - corrupt; act-er - act; fluct-er - fluct; etc.

— A. Creux; R. Berger, "De Auli ad Occidental", Origines de Occidental (1933)

The rule did not comprehend any exceptions.

In later time de Wahl yet modified his rule slightly several times, but the modern formulation is essentially the one from 1911.

== History of proposed alternatives ==
=== Creux's Rule ===
The de Wahl's rule in its classic version is very restrictive. It does not allow the formation of words such as facte (= fact), factor, from far (= to do); scriptura, inscription from scrir (= to write), or actor, action from *ager (= to act). For this reason, numerous proposals have been made to generalize it. As early as 1922, Abbé Creux proposed a version that in many cases much better reflected the actual phonological processes. In his version, after subtracting -er or -r:

1. c, g, h were changed to ct,
2. ig, ic were replaced with ect,
3. b was changed to pt,
4. m was replaced with mpt,
5. t remained unchanged,
6. t was added after the remaining letters.

Creux's rule was in many respects a significant improvement over de Wahl's rule. It allowed for much more natural word formation. For example:

- ager → actor, action,
- scriber → scriptura, inscription,
- facer → facte, factor,
- consumer → consumption,
- deducer → deduction,
- diriger → direction,
- eliger → election.

Despite this, de Wahl did not approve of the rule. He criticized it as complicated and not very useful:

I think that the ingenious rule of the esteemed Mr. Creux is too difficult for an international language intended not only for educated people but also for those of lower education. And the rule given by Mr. C. is very complicated, and its result is not as valuable as Mr. C. thinks, because the infinitives of the current Occidental are only less Latin, but no less natural.

— Edgar de Wahl, Kosmoglott

The rule generally had no exceptions and therefore produced many unnatural forms. In his response, de Wahl drew attention to forms such as:

- immerger → immerction instead of immersion,
- mulger → emulction instead of emulsion,
- disponer → dispontion instead of disposition,
- opiner → opintion instead of opinion,
- comprimer → comprimption instead of compression.

=== Homolka's Rule ===
In 1958, several years after the publication of Interlingua, Cosmoglotta No. 203 published an article entitled "The Problem of de Wahl's Rule" (Li problema del regul de Wahl), presenting a modification of de Wahl's rule by an author using the pseudonym Interlinguisticus . According to Andreas Künzli, author of the book Universalaj lingvoj en Svislando, this was the pseudonym of Hans Homolka, an Austrian Occidentalist. In the article, Homolka proposed a set of rules for acquiring the second verb root that significantly approximated Occidental to Interlingua. The proposed rule was very complex. It consisted of seven parts (items a to g) describing many of individual types of alternations occurring in Interlingua, along with exceptions.

According to Homolka's rule:

a) If after removing -er or -r the root ends in a vowel, we add t.

b) If it ends with c or g, we change it to ct.

c) If the root ends with d or r, we change it to s.

d) The fourth rule described changes to the root in a few cases where it ended in m or n:

- primer → press,
- sumer, imer, contemner → sumpt, empt, contempt,
- tener, venir → tent, vent,
- poner → posit.

e) The fifth rule described cases in which the stem ends with v or rb:

- recever, scriver → prescription, script,
- sorber → sorbent,
- solver, volver → -ut-
- mover → mot.

f) Rule six described further exceptions:

- mitter → miss, peller → puls.
- flecter, necter → flex, nex.
- verter, sentir → vers, sens.
- merger, rumper, avrir → mers, rupt, apert.

g) In other cases, removing the ending gives the desired root.

Points a) - c) had many exceptions such as:

- leer → lect,
- struer → struct,
- liger → lect,
- rediger → redact,
- cognoscer → cognit,
- miscer → mixt,
- attender → attendant,
- intender → intent.

=== Reeve's Rule ===
The Cosmoglotta's article from issue 203 mentions a rule proposed by Reeve:

The latest manifestation of this new interest is the article "De Wahl's Reformed Rule", published by our colleague W. Reeve in International Language Review No. 3. It is more complete than Creux's proposal, and its explanation shows that it is the fruit of serious study. It is true that it does not exhaust all the possibilities of "naturalization", but its author deliberately renounced this, fully aware that absolutely complete regularization would overcomplicate the structure of the language for only small real benefits.

— The Redaction of Cosmoglotta, Cosmoglotta no 203

According to the article, Reeve's rule was very similar to Homolka's rule, but it did not contain exceptions and restored roots from Latin that do not occur in modern Western European languages.

=== Present day ===
Contemporary attempts are also being made to generalize de Wahl's rule. One of these is Stief's rule. According to it:

1. You need to remove -er or -r from the infinitive.
2. If the remaining core ends in...
  1. -s , -t , -x - nothing changes.
  2. -d - we replace -d with s.
  3. In other cases we add -t . -b /-g becomes devoiced to -p /-c.

There are 13 exceptions to the rule:

1. ceder → cess
2. currer → curs
3. graver → grav
4. herer → hes
5. morir → mort
6. mover → mot
7. nocer → noc
8. opiner → opin
9. rebel → rebel
10. seder → sess
11. sentir → sens
12. venir → vent
13. verter → vers

This rule is very similar to Creux's rule. It allows for much more natural word formation than de Wahl's rule. Examples:

- facer → facte, factor,
- scriber → inscription, scriptura,
- ager → actor, action,
- leger → lection.
- proteger → protection.
