= Engelbert Pigal =

Austrian engineer and interlinguist

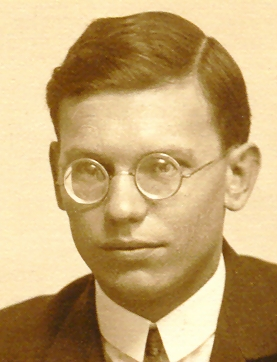
- Born: 1899?
- Died: 24 April 1978
- Citizenship: Austria
- Known for: Interlingue, Interlingua

Engelbert Pigal (1899? – 24 April 1978) was an Austrian engineer. A speaker of Interlingua and two other auxiliary languages, he wrote two cosmological monographs in Interlingua.

== Life ==
As a youth, Pigal learned the auxiliary language Ido. In 1921, he joined the preparatory committee for the first Ido congress in Vienna. At the 1926 Ido conference in Cassel, he startled many listeners by delivering a presentation on the naturalistic auxiliary language Occidental. The next year, he and Karl Janotta began to work for Occidental in Austria. Pigal was editor and co-author of Occidental, die Weltsprache ("Occidental, the World Language"), the principal work on this language. In a later work, Ab Occidental verso Interlingua ("From Occidental towards Interlingua"), he showed why he considered Interlingua to be the better alternative.

Between 1931 and 1938, Pigal served as Scientific Director of the Hoerbiger Institute in Vienna. In this position, he examined Hans Hoerbiger's theory of glacial cosmology. He published two monographs on cosmology in Interlingua, Problematica del cosmologia moderne and Astro-Geologia. In the second work, he endeavored to solve fundamental problems of geology, such as the origins of mountains and oceans, using the exact method of physics and his own theory of planetary interference.

Later, Pigal persuaded professor Eugen Wüster, also of Austria, to use Interlingua in his work to standardize international scientific terminology. This work led to the founding of the powerful International Organization for Standardization (ISO). To his death at the age of 80 (?), Pigal was a member of the Council of the Union Mundial pro Interlingua and was the national Interlingua representative in Austria.
