= Ric Berger =

Swiss professor and IAL proponent

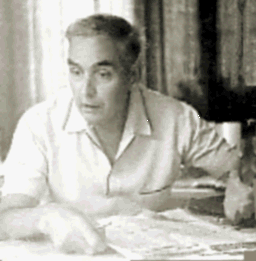
- Born: 16 August 1894; Yens
- Died: 4 August 1984 (aged 89); Morges

Richard "Ric" Berger (1894–1984) was a Swiss professor of design, decoration, and art history. He is best known for his numerous newspaper articles about historical monuments, mainly in the French-speaking part of Switzerland, including his own drawings of the buildings. Through these articles, he contributed to an increased interest in historical monuments and settings among many hitherto uninformed people, and probably also contributed indirectly to a wider interest in preserving and saving historical monuments from destruction.

Around the early 1970s, he published samples of his newspaper writings in books that were, and still are, prized by amateur historians and archeologists. He is read with more caution in university circles, being known as a "vulgarizer" and reflecting essentially the state of knowledge at the period of his publications, chiefly the 1950s. Being an active teacher as well, he wrote papers on heraldry, on the history of the alphabet and on the drawing habits of children.

== International auxiliary language activities ==
Ric Berger spent the majority of his life involved with international auxiliary languages, supporting four over the course of his life. Berger was an extremely active proponent of whichever language he supported at the time, while tending to heavily criticize others, including languages he had previously supported.

=== Esperanto ===
In 1912, at the age of 18, he became interested in universal languages as an Esperantist.

=== Ido ===
Berger began to support Ido in 1918 after six years with Esperanto.

=== Occidental (later Interlingue) ===
Berger's activities with Occidental began in 1928, when he became the editor of the magazine Svissia (known as Helvetia from 1929) which continued publication until 1933. Immediately after leaving Ido he began a fierce campaign to promote Occidental and criticize Ido in its stead, often writing multiple articles for Cosmoglotta and often devoting nearly entire issues to criticisms of Ido.

He was co-editor of the Occidental magazine "Cosmoglotta" from 1934 to 1950. In 1945 he began considering changing the name of the language, proposing the possible names Auli and Wahl. He eventually succeeded in changing the name of the language to Interlingue in 1949.

=== Interlingua ===
Ric Berger became interested in Interlingua in 1956, the last auxiliary language he worked for. From January 1959 to December 1963, Berger was secretary general of the Union Mundial pro Interlingua (UMI) and editor of the Interlingua magazine Currero. He authored more than 20 books about art and historic monuments in Switzerland and a large number of thematic notebooks in Interlingua, especially on the history of international auxiliary languages. He edited the Revista de Interlingua, which ceased with his death, from 1966 to 1983. This magazine grew to more than 6,000 pages sent to 60 countries. As head of his own publishing firm, Editiones Interlingua, he published Interlingua manuals in several languages, ensuring that manuals in the "minor languages" were included.

Europe is divided by the walls of 30 languages. Happily, among these national languages, about 10,000 words of Greek and Latin origin are common. This precious linguistic treasure should be used to the utmost without mutilating a single word or inventing others.

Revista de Interlingua no 48, 1970
