= Jakob Linzbach =

Estonian linguist

Jakob Linzbach (21 June 1874 – 30 April 1953) was an Estonian linguist.

Jakob Linzbach was born in Kõmmaste, in the Governorate of Estonia of the Russian Empire (present-day Estonia) and died in Tallinn. The claim has been made for his (1916) Principles of Philosophical Language that it independently advanced some of the claims of Ferdinand de Saussure's Course in General Linguistics, in particular anticipating phonological ideas.

Linzbach - unlike Saussure - also set himself to construct a universal writing system, which he called transcendental algebra. Linzbach's system provided a problem topic for the inaugural International Linguistics Olympiad in 2003.

== Works ==
- Линцбах, Я. Принципы философского языка. Опыт точного языкознания. Петроград [The Principles of Philosophical Language: An Attempt at Exact Linguistics], St Petersburg, 1916. Republished, 2009.
- Transcendent algebra : ideografie matematical : experiment de un lingue filosofic, Reval (Estonia) : Edition de autor, 1921.
- Die transcendente Analysis : Differential- und Integralrechnung im Denken und Vorstellen, Reval, 1922.
- La Géométrie et l'analyse géométrique de l'espace à n dimensions, idiographie mathématique. Abridged translation by G. von Kolovrat from the Russian.
- Idéologie mathématique : Etude du langage philosophique Algèbre figurée. I. Interprétation idéographique de l'équation du 1er degré à une inconnue..., Paris: privately published, 1931.
