= Object–verb–subject word order =

Rare permutation of word order

In linguistic typology, object–verb–subject (OVS) or object–verb–agent (OVA) is a rare permutation of word order. OVS denotes the sequence object–verb–subject in unmarked expressions: Apples ate Sam, Thorns have roses. The passive voice in English may appear to be in the OVS order, but that is not an accurate description. In an active voice sentence like Sam ate the apples, the grammatical subject, Sam, is the agent and is acting on the patient, the apples, which are the object of the verb, ate. In the passive voice, The apples were eaten by Sam, the order is reversed and so that patient is followed by the verb and then the agent. However, the apples become the subject of the verb, were eaten, which is modified by the prepositional phrase, by Sam, which expresses the agent, and so the usual subject–verb–(object) order is maintained.

OVS sentences in English may be parsed if relating an adjective to a noun ("cold is Alaska") although cold is a predicative adjective, not an object. Rare examples of valid if idiomatic English use of OVS typology are the poetic hyperbaton "Answer gave he none" and "What say you?" Those examples are, however, highly unusual and not typical of modern spoken English.

== Examples ==
OVS languages include Äiwoo, Guarijio, Hixkaryana, Urarina, the constructed language Klingon, and to some extent Tapirapé.

== Syntax sequence uses ==
Although not dominant, OVS may be used when the object is stressed in languages that have a relatively free word order because of case marking such as Romanian, Croatian, Basque, Esperanto, Hungarian, Finnish, Russian, and to some extent German and Dutch. Some languages like Swedish and Norwegian normally lack extensive case marking but allow such structures when pronouns, which are marked for case, are involved or when the roles are clear from context. In those languages, OVS is fairly often used when the object is already marked as the topic of a discourse, and new information is added about the object. It is frequent also if there has been a discussion or question about the nature or identity of the object and that question is answered.

Here are Norwegian examples of using OVS to emphasize the object: Det tror jeg ikke (lit. "That believe I not" – I do not believe that); Tom så jeg i går (lit. "Tom saw I yesterday" – I saw Tom yesterday); Fisk liker katten (lit. "Fish likes the cat" – The cat likes fish). In the last example, it is highly unlikely that fish is the subject and so that word order can be used.

In some languages, auxiliary rules of word order can provide enough disambiguation for an emphatic use of OVS. For example, declarative statements in Danish are ordinarily SVnO, with "n" being is the position of negating or modal adverbs. However, OVSn may be used to emphasize the object if there is no ambiguity. Thus, Susanne elsker ikke Omar (Susanne does not love Omar) and Omar elsker Susanne ikke (Omar is someone whom Susanne does not love) have neither Omar nor Susanne marked for case but mean the same except for emphasis.

The flexibility of word order in Russian also allows for OVS sentences, generally to emphasize the subject: Я закончил задание (lit. "I finished mission") versus Задание закончил я (lit. "Mission finished I" – It was I who finished the mission).

In Turkish, OVS may be used to emphasize the verb. For example, Bardağı kırdı John (lit. "the glass broke John": John broke the glass) is a better answer to the question "What happened to the glass?" than the regular SOV sentence John bardağı kırdı (lit. "John the glass broke").

== Absolutive–verb–ergative ==
At least five languages have been documented (Makushi, Arekuna, Päri, Mangarayi, and Selkʼnam) that use OVS order in transitive clauses but SV order in intransitive clauses. Since all of those languages have ergative–absolutive alignment, their word order is not object–verb–subject in the traditional sense but might be more accurately described as absolutive–verb–ergative (AVE) (see also syntactic ergativity). At least three of those languages (Makushi, Arekuna, and Päri) mark absolutive agreement on a verb with a prefix and ergative agreement with a suffix, which indicates an AVE-like structure on a deeper syntactic level.

== In constructed languages ==
The object–verb–subject sequence also occurs in Interlingua although the Interlingua Grammar makes no mention of it accepting passive voice. Thomas Breinstrup, the editor-in-chief of Panorama in Interlingua, sometimes uses the sequence in articles written for Panorama.

This sequence was chosen for the constructed language Klingon, a language spoken by the extraterrestrial Klingon race in the fictional universe of the Star Trek series, to make the language sound deliberately alien and counterintuitive.

That sequence, like the other five, is acceptable in Esperanto.

== Theoretical analysis ==
Desmond C. Derbyshire and Geoffrey K. Pullum note that some SOV languages (such as Wichita) allow rightward movement of the subject noun phrase in certain sentences, producing OVS as a marked word order. Derbyshire and Pullum propose that languages with default OVS word order could have evolved from an earlier SOV stage, in which OVS was reanalyzed as the unmarked word order and SOV as marked.

== See also ==
- Subject–object–verb
- Subject–verb–object
- Object–subject–verb
- Verb–object–subject
- Verb–subject–object
- Category:Object–verb–subject languages
