= Interlingua a Prime Vista =

Interlingua a Prime Vista (Interlingua at First Sight; first published 1954) is a manual developed by Alexander Gode as a basic introduction to Interlingua. Gode had collaborated with Ezra Clark Stillman on a manual Spanish at Sight. Published in 1943, this book utilized a procedure for learning a language using only text in that language, accompanied by illustrations. Gode had continued the series with Portuguese at Sight, published later that year, and French at Sight, published the following year. He used the same procedure for Interlingua a Prime Vista.

The four manuals were part of the research program of the International Auxiliary Language Association, which developed Interlingua. In theory, the language would be understandable at first sight or hearing to the speakers of the Western languages. Gode and Stillman's at-sight procedure coincided with this concept.
