= Herbert N. Shenton =

Herbert Newhard Shenton (1884 – 1937) was a professor of Sociology at Columbia University and later at Syracuse University in New York. He was executive secretary of the International Auxiliary Language Association (IALA) from 1924 until his death in 1937. The interlinguistic work of IALA culminated in the publication of the Interlingua–English Dictionary and Interlingua Grammar in 1951. Through these historic works, IALA first presented Interlingua to the general public.

In 1931, Shenton wrote the essay "A Social Problem" in International Communication: A Symposium on the Language Problem, published by IALA and the Orthological Institute. This small volume also included works by eminent linguist Edward Sapir and professor of English Otto Jespersen. Shenton organized an extensive research project on the use of auxiliary languages at international conferences. The results were published under the rubric Cosmopolitan Conversation by Columbia University Press in 1933.
