= Interlingua Division of Science Service =

The Science Service founded an Interlingua Division in 1953. It was run by Alexander Gode as the directory, with Hugh E. Blair as his assistant. The division focused on translating abstracts, as well as several larger scientific works, into Interlingua. The Interlingua Division also made publications of the International Auxiliary Language Association (IALA) available to the public at no cost.
