= Wilhelm Bladin =

Wilhelm Bladin (November 24, 1884 – September 16, 1968) was a noted progressive teacher and author born in Gävle, Sweden. He compiled grammars, manuals, and dictionaries in English, German, French, and Interlingua. He was the second Secretary General of the Union Mundial pro Interlingua for Sweden.

He became a fil.cand. in English, German, and French in 1905, a fil.lic. in 1908, a fil.dr. in English in 1911, and later a fil.lic. in French. He was a lector in Härnösand beginning in 1912 and in Malmö beginning in 1916. He taught the first French course on Swedish radio from 1928 to 1933, at a time when radio was a recent invention. He was founder of a secondary superior school, Privata Elementarläroverket, which now, under the name Bladins Skola, comprises a fundamental school and a gymnasium. The school, which began at the end of the 19th century, is one of the oldest in Sweden. Bladin remained its Rector until the 1950s.

Bladin was initially a proponent of Latino sine Flexione. He later became the Swedish representative for Interlingua. He joined John Nordin (1887–1983) and fil.mag. Erik Berggren in compiling a 14,000-word Swedish-Interlingua dictionary, published in 1964. Bladin also published the books "Svensk-engelsk grammatisk ordbok" in 1914, "Nyckel till student- och realskoleskrivningar i tyska och engelska" and "Student- och realskoleskrivningar i tyska och engelska" in 1916, "Tysk läsebok" con Axel Wahlgren in 1922, "Lärobok i engelska" and "Privatlektioner i engelska" also in 1922, and "Rätt grund i engelska" in 1951.

== See also ==
- Interlingua dictionaries
