= Interlingua dictionaries =

Interlingua dictionaries are bilingual dictionaries intended to aid learners and speakers of the auxiliary language Interlingua. Some of the larger dictionaries are presented here.

The first Interlingua dictionary, titled Interlingua–English: A Dictionary of the International language, is often referred to as the Interlingua–English Dictionary (IED). First published in 1951, the IED still serves as an authoritative reference work, partly because its entries display the etymological connections between words which are often obscured in other languages. The IED was compiled by Alexander Gode and his research staff.

The 27,000 words of the IED are supplemented by the 25,000-word Supplementary List. While not a full dictionary, the list is a useful adjunct to the IED because many Interlingua words are identical, or nearly identical, to their counterparts in English. Thus, readers who speak English immediately recognize the Interlingua words and have no need for translations. Author Piet Cleij collects the entries during his work on Interlingua dictionaries.

Some other dictionaries include:

- Wörterbuch Deutsch–Interlingua (WDI), a 263-page dictionary with 45,000 to 50,000 entries. It was compiled by André Schild. Schild, the first Secretary General of the Union Mundial pro Interlingua, held this post from 1955 to 1958. A new edition of the WDI was published in 2006.
- Concise English–Interlingua Dictionary, a 382-page work by F. P. Gopsill and Brian C. Sexton
- Dictionario Francese–Interlingua, a 55,000-entry work by Piet Cleij
- Dicionário Português–Interlíngua, by Euclides Bordignon, with 330 pages and about 30,000 entries
- Svensk–Interlingua Ordbok, a Swedish–Interlingua dictionary with 90,000 entries. Written by Pian Boalt, it appears in paper and in electronic formats at Softbear and Babylon
- Woordenboek Interlingua–Nederlands, an Interlingua–Dutch dictionary by Piet Cleij with 50,000 entries, in paper and in electronic format at Softbear
  - Woordenboek Nederlands–Interlingua, a Dutch–Interlingua dictionary by Piet Cleij with more than 140,000 entries

Many Interlingua dictionaries are available online at the Babylon lingual website. In 2001, Panorama in Interlingua reported that Babylon was distributing the Interlingua–English Dictionary, by download or subscription, at an average rate of 846 issues a day.
