= Stanley Mulaik =

Stanley Mulaik may refer to:

- Stanley A. Mulaik (born 1935), psychologist and Interlingua proponent
- Stanley B. Mulaik (1902–1995), zoologist
