= Deanna Hammond =

Canadian-American translator and linguist

Deanna L. Hammond (1942–1997) was a Canadian-American translator and linguist. She led the Linguistic Services section of the US Library of Congress. During the 1990s, she taught Spanish translation at George Mason University and at American University. She was president of the American Translators Association from 1989 to 1991. In 1992, she received the association's highest award, the Alexander Gode medal. She headed the US delegation to the Statutory Congress of the International Translation Federation in 1990. She was president of the Interlingua Institute from 1993 until her death.

Her mother was Canadian, and her father was from the US. After graduating from Washington State University, Hammond received a Master's degree in Linguistics from Ohio University and a Doctorate in Spanish Linguistics from Georgetown University. She lived in Colombia from 1964 to 1967, first as a member of the Peace Corps and later as an English instructor at the Industrial University of Santander. She also taught at the superior school in Pullman, Washington.

She became a volunteer for Senator Henry M. Jackson in 1974, and she taught English as a Second Language for Northern Virginia Community College from 1974 to 1977. She organized conferences for the Association for Machine Translation in the Americas and wrote articles for publications such as the Congressional Record, the Modern Language Journal, the Annals of Political Science, and the Chronicle of the American Translators Association.

She died of pancreatic cancer at the age of 55. Leland B. Yeager, the Vice President of the Interlingua Institute, assumed her post temporarily until Henry Fischbach was reappointed President in January 1998.
