= Maulik =

Maulik is a popular Indian and Bangladeshi name. Also seen as Moulik, Maulick and Moulick.

Notable people with the name include:

As surname:

- Samarendra Maulik (1881–1950), Indian entomologist
- Ujjwal Maulik, Indian computer scientist

As given name:

- Maulik Pancholy (born 1974), American actor

== See also ==
- Malik (disambiguation)
- Mulaik, a surname
