= Interlingua grammar =

This article is an informal outline of the grammar of Interlingua, an international auxiliary language first publicized by IALA. It follows the usage of the original grammar text (Gode & Blair, 1951), which is accepted today but regarded as conservative.

The grammar of Interlingua is based largely on that of the Romance languages, but simplified, primarily under the influence of English. However, all of the control languages, including German and Russian, were consulted in developing the grammar. Grammatical features absent from any of the primary control languages (English, French, Italian, Spanish and Portuguese) were dropped. For example, there is neither adjectival agreement (Spanish/Portuguese gatos negros 'black cats'), since this feature is absent in English, nor continuous verb tenses (English I am reading), since they are absent in French. Conversely, Interlingua has articles, unlike Russian, as Russian is a secondary control language.

There is no systemic marking for parts of speech. For example, nouns do not have to end in any particular letter. Typically, however, adjectives end in -e or a consonant, adverbs end in -mente or -o, while nouns end in -a, -e, -o or a consonant. Finite verbs virtually always end in -a, -e, or -i, while infinitives add -r: scribe, 'write', 'writes'; scriber, 'to write'.

== Articles ==
The definite article is le, the indefinite article is un, and neither article shows any agreement in form with nouns. The prepositions a ("to") and de ("of") fuse with a following le into al and del respectively.

The definite article is, on the whole, used as in English, with the exception that it should not be omitted with titles preceding proper names nor with abstract nouns representing an entire class, species, etc.

== Nouns ==
=== Plural ===
Nouns inflect for number only. Plural nouns take -s after a vowel, -es after a consonant other than c and -hes after -c. -hes serves to preserve the hard [k] sound of c. Examples:

catto 'cat' → cattos 'cats'
can 'dog' → canes 'dogs'
roc 'rook' [chess] → roches 'rooks'

Borrowings from other languages create plural in irregular way:

film -> films,
club -> clubs,
chef -> chefs.

=== Gender ===
Interlingua has no grammatical gender. Animate nouns are sex-neutral, unless they refer specifically to a male or a female. Thus, jornalista 'journalist' and scientista 'scientist' are sex-neutral, while rege 'king' and regina 'queen' are sex-specific. Explicit feminine forms can be created by substituting final -a for a final -o or -e or by adding the suffix -essa.

puero 'boy' → puera 'girl',
tigre 'tiger' → tigressa 'female tiger',
duce 'duke' -> duchessa 'duchess'.

These colour the regular forms as masculine when they appear in the same context.

Feminine nouns can be also directly derived from verbs by suffixes -atrice and -itrice:

imperar -> imperatrice,
consumer -> consumitrice.

Sometimes this happens in iregular way:

ager (= to act) -> actrice (= actress).

=== Apposition ===
Unlike in English, nouns cannot take adjectival forms, such as 'winter weather', 'research laboratory', 'fall coat', etc. Such constructions instead require the use of a preposition or a corresponding adjective, respectively tempore hibernal, laboratoria de recerca, and mantello pro autumno. This is however excepted by proper nouns which can be used adjectivally as in English: contator Geiger 'Geiger counter', motor Diesel 'Diesel engine', radios Röntgen 'Roentgen rays', etc.

Despite the above restrictions, Interlingua permits use of apposition, where the two nouns refer to the same thing.

arbore nano 'dwarf tree'
nave domo 'house boat'

Male and female forms should match.

== Adjectives ==
Adjectives may precede or follow the noun they modify. As a matter of style, short adjectives tend to precede, long adjectives tend to follow. Numerals always precede the noun.

belle oculos or oculos belle 'beautiful eyes'
un bon idea, un idea ingeniose 'a good idea, an ingenious idea'

An adjective never has to agree with the noun it modifies, but adjectives may be pluralized when there is no explicit noun to modify.

le parve infantes 'the little children'; but le parves 'the little ones'

Comparative degree is expressed by plus or minus preceding the adjective and superlative degree by le plus or le minus.

un plus feroce leon 'a fiercer lion'
un traino minus rapide 'a less speedy train'
le plus alte arbore 'the tallest tree'
le solution le minus costose 'the least costly solution'.

The suffix -issime may be used to express the absolute superlative degree.

un aventura excellentissime 'a most excellent adventure'

The adjectives bon 'good', mal 'bad', magne 'great', and parve 'small' have optional irregular forms for the comparative and superlative.

| bon → plus bon → le plus bon | or | bon → melior → optime |
| mal → plus mal → le plus mal | or | mal → pejor → pessime |
| magne → plus magne → le plus magne | or | magne → major → maxime |
| parve → plus parve → le plus parve | or | parve → minor → minime |

Theoretically, every adjective may serve as a pronoun referring to something expressed in a previous passage.

The Interlingua-English Dictionary (IED) lacks a lot of adjectives associated with nouns such as communista, populista, optimista etc. Then nouns ending with -a and -o are used as adjectives for instance

- Partito communista = communist party,
- Politico populista = populist politician,
- Persona optimista = optimist person,
- Flor bronzo = bronze flower.

Admittedly the Interlingua Grammar (IG) forbids to use nouns as adjectives, but both IED and IG seem to allow such case, because contain phrases such as papiro moneta (= paper money) and arbore nano (= dwarf tree).

== Adverbs ==
There are two types of adverbs, primary and secondary. Primary adverbs are a closed class of grammatical operators, such as quasi, 'almost'; jam, 'already'; and totevia, 'anyway'. Secondary adverbs are an open class derived from corresponding adjectives by adding the suffix -mente (-amente after final -c).

felice 'happy' → felicemente 'happily'
magic 'magical' → magicamente 'magically'

A few common adverbs have optional short forms in -o.

sol 'alone' → solo or solmente 'only'

Like adjectives, adverbs use plus and minus to express the comparative and le plus and le minus to express the superlative.

Illa canta plus bellemente que illa parla. 'She sings more beautifully than she speaks.'
Le gepardo curre le plus rapide de omne animales. 'The cheetah runs the fastest of all animals.'

The adverbs equivalent to bon, 'good' and mal, 'bad' have optional irregular forms.

| bonmente → plus bonmente → le plus bonmente | or | ben → plus ben → le plus ben | or | ben → melio → optimo |
| malmente → plus malmente→ le plus malmente | or | mal → plus mal → le plus mal | or | mal → pejo → pessimo |

== Pronouns ==
=== Introduction ===
Personal pronouns are presented in the following table.

Personal pronouns - singular
| Person | Gender | Subject (Nominative) | Object (Oblique) | After a preposition (con me, sin te etc.) | Possessive |
| 1st | | io | me | me | mi(e) |
| 2d | | tu | te | te | tu(e) |
| 3rd | Masc. | ille | le | ille | su(e) |
| 3rd | Fem. | illa | la | illa | su(e) |
| 3rd | Neut. | illo | lo | illo | su(e) |
Personal pronouns - plural
| Person | Gender | Subject | Object | After a preposition | Possessive |
| 1st | | nos | nos | nos | nostre |
| 2d | | vos | vos | vos | vostre |
| 3rd | Masc. | illes | les | illes | lor(e) |
| 3rd | Fem. | illas | las | illas | lor(e) |
| 3rd | Neut. | illos | los | illos | lor(e) |
Pronouns il and on
| | | Subject | Object | After a preposition | Possessive |
| Impersonal pronoun | | il | - | - | - |
| Indefinite pronoun | | on | uno | uno | su(e) |

Other than that there are other, less popular or unused pronouns, such as:

- yo = io,
- ego = io,
- il = ille,
- illi = illes,
- uno = on.

Ego is present in words like egoismo, egoista, yo, il and illi are likely borrowings from occidental.

Personal pronouns inflect for number, case, and (in the third person) gender. Subject pronouns serve as the subject of a verb. Examples:

- "Qui es ibi?" "Io." "Who's there?" "Me."
- Tu arrestava le chef de policia. 'You have arrested the chief of police.'

Object pronouns are used for direct objects, and may also be used for indirect objects. (Alternatively, indirect objects are expressed through a, 'to' plus a pronoun.) Examples:

- Le caffe es excellente: proba lo! 'The coffee is excellent: try it!'
- Dice me le conto; dice me lo (or Dice le conto a me...) 'Tell me the story; tell it to me.'

One could also assert the existence of a separate prepositional case, since third-person pronouns use the longer forms ille, illes etc. after a preposition in place of the expected le, les etc.

Da le can a illes. 'Give them the dog.'

Many users follow the European custom of using the plural forms vos etc. rather than tu etc. in formal situations.

Esque vos passava un viage placente, Seniora Chan? 'Did you have a pleasant trip, Mrs. Chan?'
Aperi vostre valise, Senior. 'Open your suitcase, Sir.'

Illes can be used as a sex-neutral pronoun, like English 'they'. Illas may be used for entirely female groups.

=== Possessive pronouns ===
Shorter possessive pronouns (mi, tu etc.) are used before nouns when they are not preceded by the article. Examples:

- Mi amico.
- Mi casa.
- Tu auto.

In all other cases the longer forms (mie, tue etc.) are used. Examples:

- Le mie casa.
- Le auto es le mie = the car is mine,
- Deo mie!
- Mi auto es plus rapide que le tue.
- alicun amicos mie = some friends of mine
- Matre mie! Es un picante bolla de carne! = Mamma mia, that's a spicy meatball!

=== Pronouns il and on ===
Il is an impersonal nominative pronoun used in impersonal constructions such as il pluve, 'it's raining'. It can also serve as a placeholder when the true subject is a clause occurring later in the sentence. It may be omitted where the sense is clear.

Il deveni tarde. 'It's getting late.'
Il es ver que nos expende multe moneta. 'It's true that we're spending a lot of money.'
Es bon que vos veni ora. 'It's good that you come now.'

On is a nominative pronoun used when the identity of the subject is vague. The English translation is often 'one', 'you', or 'they'. It is sometimes equivalent to an English passive voice construction. The oblique form is uno.

On non vide tal cosas actualmente. 'One doesn't see such things these days.'
On sape nunquam lo que evenira. 'You never know what will happen.'
On construe un nove linea de metro al centro urban. 'They're building a new subway line to downtown.'
On collige le recyclabiles omne venerdi. 'Recyclables are picked up every Friday.'
Tal pensatas afflige uno in le profundo del depression. 'Such thoughts afflict one in the depths of depression.'

=== Reflexive pronouns ===
Reflexive pronouns are used when the subject of a verb is identical with the direct or indirect object. As in the Romance languages, reflexive constructions are often used where English would employ an intransitive verb or the passive voice.

Deo adjuta les, qui se adjuta. 'God helps those who help themselves'.
Io me sibila un melodia. 'I whistle a tune to myself.'
Tu te rasava? 'Have you shaved?'
Francese se parla in Francia. 'French is spoken in France.'

=== Demonstratives ===
Demonstratives
| Role | Number | Gender | Proximate | Remote |
| Adjective | – | – | iste | ille |
| Pronoun | Sing. | masc. | iste | (ille) |
| Pronoun | Sing. | fem. | ista | (illa) |
| Pronoun | Sing. | neut. | isto | (illo) |
| Pronoun | Plur. | masc. | istes | (illes) |
| Pronoun | Plur. | fem. | istas | (illas) |
| Pronoun | Plur. | neut. | istos | (illos) |

The main demonstratives are the adjective iste, 'this' and the corresponding pronouns iste (masculine), ista (feminine), and isto (neuter), which may be pluralized. They are used more widely than English 'this/these', often encroaching on the territory of English 'that/those'. Where the subject of a sentence has two plausible antecedents, iste (or one of its derivatives) refers to the second one.

Iste vino es pessime. 'This wine is terrible.'
Isto es un bon idea. 'That's a good idea.'
Janet accompaniava su soror al galleria... 'Janet accompanied her sister to the gallery...'

(a) Illa es un artista notabile. 'She [Janet] is a well-known artist.'
(b) Ista es un artista notabile. 'She [Janet's sister] is a well-known artist.'

The demonstrative of remoteness is ille 'that'. The corresponding pronouns ille, illa, illo and their plurals are identical with the third-person personal pronouns, though they are normally accentuated in speech.

Io cognosce ille viro; ille se appella Smith. 'I know that man; his name is Smith.'
Illo es un obra magnific. 'That is a magnificent work.'

=== Relative and interrogative pronouns ===
The relative pronouns for animates are qui (nominative case and after prepositions) and que (oblique case).

Nos vole un contabile qui sape contar. 'We want an accountant who knows how to count.'
Nos vole un contabile super qui nos pote contar. We want an accountant who we can count on.' (an accountant on whom we can count)
Nos vole un contabile que le policia non perseque. 'We want an accountant whom the police are not pursuing.'

For inanimates, que covers both the nominative and oblique cases.

Il ha duo sortas de inventiones: illos que on discoperi e illos que discoperi uno. 'There are two types of inventions: those that you discover and those that discover you.'

Cuje 'whose' is the genitive case for both animates and inanimates.

un autor cuje libros se vende in milliones 'an author whose books sell in the millions'
un insula cuje mysterios resta irresolvite 'an island whose mysteries remain unsolved'

All the above may be replaced by the relative adjective forms le qual (singular) and le quales (plural).

Mi scriptorio esseva in disordine – le qual, nota ben, es su stato normal. 'My desk was in a mess – which, mind you, is its usual state.'
Duo cosinos remote, del quales io sape nihil, veni visitar. 'Two distant cousins, of whom I know nothing, are coming to visit.'

The relative pronouns also serve as interrogative pronouns (see Questions).

== Verbs ==
Main verb forms
| Tense | Ending | -ar verbs | -er verbs | -ir verbs |
| Infinitive | -r | parlar | vider | audir |
| Present | – | parla | vide | audi |
| Past* | -va | parlava | videva | audiva |
| Future* | -ra | parlara | videra | audira |
| Conditional* | -rea | parlarea | viderea | audirea |
| Present participle | -(e)nte | parlante | vidente | audiente |
| Past participle | -te | parlate | vidite | audite |
*For alternative, compound forms, see Compound tenses.

The verb system is a simplified version of the systems found in English and the Romance languages. There is no imperfective aspect, as in Romance, no perfect as in English, and no continuous aspect, as in English and some Romance languages. Except (optionally) for esser 'to be', there are no personal inflections, and the indicative also covers the subjunctive and imperative moods. Three common verbs (esse, habe and vade) usually take short forms in the present tense (es, ha and va respectively), and a few optional irregular verbs are available.

For convenience' sake, this section often uses the term tense to also cover mood and aspect, though this is not strict grammatical terminology.

The table at the right shows the main verb forms, with examples for -ar, -er and -ir verbs (based on parlar 'to speak', vider 'to see', and audir 'to hear').

The simple past, future, and conditional tenses correspond to semantically identical compound tenses (composed of auxiliary verbs plus infinitives or past participles). These in turn furnish patterns for building more-complex tenses such as the future perfect.

=== Infinitives ===
Infinitive verbs always end in -ar, -er, or -ir. They cover the functions of both the infinitive and the gerund in English and can be pluralized where it makes sense.

Cognoscer nos es amar nos. 'To know us is to love us.'
Il es difficile determinar su strategia. 'It's hard to figure out his strategy.'
Illes time le venir del locustas. 'They fear the coming of the locusts.'
Le faceres de illa evocava un admiration general. 'Her doings evoked a widespread admiration.'

Infinitives are also used in some compound tenses (see below).

=== Simple tenses ===
There are four simple tenses: the present, past, future, and conditional.

- The present tense can be formed from the infinitive by removing the final -r. It covers the simple and continuous present tenses in English. The verbs esser 'to be', haber 'to have', and vader 'to go' normally take the short forms es, ha, and va rather than esse, habe, and vade.

Io ama mangos; io mangia un justo ora. 'I love mangoes; I'm eating one right now.'
Mi auto es vetere e ha multe defectos: naturalmente illo va mal! 'My car is old and has lots of things wrong with it: of course it runs poorly!'

- The simple past tense can be formed by adding -va to the present tense form. It covers the English simple past and past perfect, along with their continuous equivalents.

Io vos diceva repetitemente: le hospites jam comenciava partir quando le casa se incendiava. 'I've told you again and again: the guests were already starting to leave when the house burst into flames.'

- The simple future can be formed by adding -ra to the present tense form. Future tense forms are stressed on the suffix (retornara 'will return'). It covers the English simple and continuous future tenses.

Nos volara de hic venerdi vespere, e sabbato postmeridie nos prendera le sol al plagia in Santorini. 'We'll fly out Friday evening, and by Saturday afternoon we'll be sunbathing on the beach in Santorini.'

- The simple conditional consists of the present tense form plus -rea. Like the future tense, it is stressed on the suffix (preferea 'would prefer). In function it resembles the English conditional.

Si ille faceva un melior reclamo, ille venderea le duple. 'If he did better advertising, he would sell twice as much.'

=== Participles ===
The present participle is effectively the present tense form plus -nte. Verbs in -ir take -iente rather than *-inte (nutrir 'to feed' → nutriente 'feeding'). It functions as an adjective or as the verb in a participial phrase.

un corvo parlante 'a talking crow'
Approximante le station, io sentiva un apprehension terribile. 'Approaching the station, I felt a sense of dread.'

The past participle can be constructed by adding -te to the present tense form, except that -er verbs go to -ite rather than *-ete (eder 'to edit' → edite 'edited'). It is used as an adjective and to form various compound tenses.

un conto ben contate 'a well told story'

=== Compound tenses ===
Three compound tenses – the compound past, future, and conditional – are semantically identical with the corresponding simple tenses.

- The compound past tense consists of ha (the present tense of haber 'to have') plus the past participle.

Le imperio ha cadite. = Le imperio cadeva. 'The empire fell.'

- The compound future tense is constructed from va (the present tense of vader 'to go') plus the infinitive.

Io va retornar. = Io retornara. 'I shall return.'

- The rarely used compound conditional tense uses the auxiliary velle plus the infinitive.

Io velle preferer facer lo sol. = Io prefererea facer lo sol. 'I'd prefer to do it alone.'

Other than that the verb va along with present participle creates present quasi-tense, for instance:

Le climate de Alaska va deveniente plus benigne. 'The climate of Alaska keeps getting milder.'

The Interlingua Grammar doesn't elaborate on its use. It's illustrated only by one example.

The fourth basic compound tense is the passive, formed from es (the present tense of esser 'to be') plus the past participle.

Iste salsicias es fabricate per experte salsicieros. 'These sausages are made by expert sausage-makers.'

A wide variety of complex tenses can be created following the above patterns, by replacing ha, va, and es with other forms of haber, vader, and esser. Examples:

- The future perfect, using habera 'will have' plus the past participle

Ante Natal, tu habera finite tu cursos. 'By Christmas you will have finished your courses.'

- The past imperfect, using vadeva 'were going' plus the infinitive

Plus tarde illa vadeva scriber un romance premiate. 'Later she would write a prize-winning novel.'

- The passive-voice past perfect, using habeva essite 'had been' plus the past participle

Nostre planeta habeva essite surveliate durante multe annos. 'Our planet had been watched for many years.'

=== Other tenses ===
There are no distinct forms for the imperative and subjunctive moods, except in the case of esser 'to be'. Present-tense forms normally serve both functions. For clarity's sake, a nominative pronoun may be added after the verb.

Face lo ora! 'Do it now!'

Le imperatrice desira que ille attende su mandato. 'The empress desires that he await her command.'

Va tu retro al campo; resta vos alteros hic. 'You, go back to the camp; you others, stay here.'

The infinitive can serve as another, stylistically more impersonal, imperative form.

Cliccar hic. 'Click here.'

A less urgent version of imperative, the cohortative, employs a present-tense verb within a "that" ("que") clause and may be used with the first and third person as well as the second. The alternative vamos 'let's' (or 'let's go') is available for the second-person plural, but deprecated by some authorities.

Que tu va via! 'I wish you'd go away!'

Que illes mangia le brioche. 'Let them eat cake.'

Que nos resta hic ancora un die. or Vamos restar hic ancora un die. 'Let's stay here one more day.'

Sia is the imperative and subjunctive form of esser 'to be'. The regular form esse may also be used.

Sia caute! 'Be careful!'

Sia ille vive o sia ille morte... 'Be he alive or be he dead...'

Que lor vita insimul sia felice! 'May their life together be happy!'

== Irregular verbs ==
=== esser, haber, vader ===
Irregular forms of vader
| | Person | Singular | Plural |
| Present | 1. pers. | va | vamos |
| Present | 2-3. pers. | va | van |

Irregular forms of esser

Person
Singular
Plural
Present
1. pers.
so
somos
2-3. pers.
es
son
Past
era
Future
sera
Conditional
serea
Imperative,

subjunctive

sia

The only irregular verb forms employed by most users are es, ha, and va – the shortened present-tense forms of esser 'to be', haber 'to have' and vader 'to go' – plus sia, the imperative/subjunctive of esser.

Other irregular forms are available, but official Interlingua publications (and the majority of users) have always favoured the regular forms. These optional irregular forms are known as collaterals.

A significant minority of users employ certain collateral forms of esser 'to be': son (present plural), era (past), sera (future), and serea (conditional), instead of es, esseva, essera, and esserea.

- Nos vancouveritas son un banda pictoresc. = Nos vancouveritas es un banda pictoresc. 'We Vancouverites are a colourful lot.'
- Le timor era incognoscite. = Le timor esseva incognoscite. 'Fear was unknown.'
- Que sera, sera. = Que essera, essera. 'What will be, will be.'
- Il serea melio si nos non veniva. = Il esserea melio si nos non veniva. 'It would be better if we hadn't come.'

The forms io so 'I am', nos somos 'we are', nos vamos 'we go' and vos/illes van 'you/they go' also exist but are rarely used.

=== Verbs with irregular present participle ===
Some verbs ending with -er have preferred irregular present participle ending with -iente instead of -ente. Those are caper (= to grasp, seize), facer (= to do, make), saper (= to know), their compounds and all verbs ending in -ciper, -ficer, -jicer and -spicer. The regular forms are facente, sapente, etc., but the "preferred forms", according to the original grammar, are faciente, sapiente, etc. Examples are:

un homine sapiente = un homine sapente 'a knowledgeable person'
Recipiente le littera, ille grimassava. = Recipente le littera, ille grimassava. 'Receiving the letter, he grimaced.'

Today, most users employ the regular forms in spontaneous usage. Forms like sufficiente are often used as adjectives, under the influence of similar forms in the source languages.

== Double-stem verbs ==
The Neo-Latin vocabulary that underlies Interlingua includes a group of verbs whose stems mutate when attached to certain suffixes. For example, agente, agentia, actrice, activista, reagente, reaction are all derivatives of ager 'to act', but some use the primary stem ag-, while others use the secondary stem act-. There are hundreds of such verbs, especially in international scientific vocabulary.

sentir 'to feel' (second stem: sens-) → sentimento, sensor
repeller 'to push away' (second stem: repuls-) → repellente, repulsive

This raises a logical issue. Adding -e to one of these secondary stems produces an adjective that is structurally and semantically equivalent to the past participle of the same verb. Experte, for example, is related to experir 'to experience', which has the past participle experite. Yet, semantically, there is little difference between un experte carpentero 'an expert carpenter' and un experite carpentero 'an experienced carpenter'. Effectively, experte = experite. Furthermore, one can form a word like le experito 'the experienced one' as a quasi-synonym of le experto 'the expert'.

This process can be reversed. That is, can one substitute experte for experite in compound tenses (and other second-stem adjectives for other past participles).

Io ha experte tal cosas antea. = Io ha experite tal cosas antea. 'I've experienced such things before.'
Illa ha scripte con un pluma. = Illa ha scribite con un pluma. 'She wrote with a quill.'

The original Interlingua grammar (Gode & Blair, 1951) permitted this usage, and illustrated it in one experimental text. A minority of Interlinguists employ the irregular roots, at least occasionally, more often with recognizable forms like scripte (for scribite 'written') than opaque ones like fisse (for findite 'split'). The practice is controversial. Deprecators suggest that they complicate the active use of Interlingua and may confuse beginners. Proponents argue that by using the irregular participles, students of Interlingua become more aware of the connections between words like agente and actor, consequentia and consecutive, and so on. A compromise position holds that the irregular forms may be useful in some educational contexts (e.g., when using Interlingua to teach international scientific vocabulary or as an intermediate step in the study of Romance languages), but not in general communication.

== Numerals ==
Cardinal numbers are formed by addition and multiplication of predetermined root numerals. Smaller values before larger ones corresponds to multiplication, while larger values before smaller ones corresponds to addition. Numerals below one hundred consist of a root numeral for the tens and a root numeral for the ones, concatenated with a hyphen, i.e. 42 quaranta-duo 'forty-two'.

For example, the number 2345 would be duo milles tres centos quaranta-cinque 'two thousand three hundred (and) forty-five', which corresponds to the expression 2 × 1000 + 3 × 100 + 40 + 5. The number 9 876 000 would be nove milliones octo centos septanta-sex milles 'nine million eight hundred (and) seventy-six thousand', which corresponds to the expression 9 × 1 000 000 + (8 × 100 + 70 + 6) × 1000. The conjunction e 'and' can always be inserted arbitrarily between any two roots in a number, even replacing the hyphen between tens and ones.

The cardinal numbers below 100 are all constructed regularly from nineteen roots. (Note that among the tens, fifty and onwards are constructed regularly from the corresponding ones and the ending -anta.)

| 0 | zero |
| 1 | un | 10 | dece |
| 2 | duo | 20 | vinti |
| 3 | tres | 30 | trenta |
| 4 | quatro | 40 | quaranta |
| 5 | cinque | 50 | cinquanta |
| 6 | sex | 60 | sexanta |
| 7 | septe | 70 | septanta |
| 8 | octo | 80 | octanta |
| 9 | novem, nove | 90 | novanta |

The number 100 is cento 'hundred' and the number 1000 is mille 'thousand'. All further larger numbers follow the long scale.

| 100 | cento |
| 1 000 | mille |
| 1 000 000^{1} | million |
| 1 000 × 1 000 000^{1} | milliardo |
| 1 000 000^{2} | billion |
| 1 000 × 1 000 000^{2} | billiardo |
| 1 000 000^{3} | trillion |
| 1 000 × 1 000 000^{3} | trilliardo |
| 1 000 000^{4} | quatrillion |
| 1 000 × 1 000 000^{4} | quatrilliardo |
| 1 000 000^{5} | quintillion |
| 1 000 × 1 000 000^{5} | quintilliardo |
| ... | ... |

The ordinal numbers have their own root numerals for the ones (and ten).

| 1st | prime |
| 2nd | secunde |
| 3rd | tertie |
| 4th | quarte |
| 5th | quinte |
| 6th | sexte |
| 7th | septime |
| 8th | octave |
| 9th | none |
| 10th | decime |
| last | ultime |

All other ordinal numbers are formed by the cardinal number followed by the suffix -esime. In compound ordinals, only the last root numeral is modified.

| 11th | dece-prime 'eleventh' |
| 102nd | cento secunde 'hundred (and) second' |
| 99th | novanta-none 'ninety-ninth' |
| 300th | tres centesime 'three hundredth' |

=== Fractional, multiplicative, collective and adverbial numbers ===
With the exception of medie 'half', all fractional numerals are formed by a cardinal number representing the numerator followed by an ordinal number representing the denominator.

| 1/2 | medie 'half' |
| 1/4 | un quarte 'one quarter' |
| 22/7 | vinti-duo septime 'twenty-two seventh(s)' |

Multiplicative numerals consist of either 14 basic multiplicative numeral roots or 14 basic prefixes which can in principle be compounded to any word.

| | Multiplicative numeral | Multiplicative prefix |
|---|---|---|
| 1 | simple or simplice 'simple' | uni- or mono- |
| 2 | duple or duplice 'double' | bi- or di- |
| 3 | triple or triplice 'triple' | tri- |
| 4 | quadruple 'quadruple' | quadri- or tetra- |
| 5 | quintuple 'quintuple' | penta- |
| 6 | sextuple 'sixfold' | hexa- |
| 7 | septuple 'sevenfold' | hepta- |
| 8 | octuple 'eightfold' | octa- |
| 9 | nonuple 'ninefold' | ennea- |
| 10 | decuple 'tenfold' | deca- |
| 100 | centuple 'hundredfold' | hecto- |

Continuing the series, all of the metric prefixes are valid productive prefixes in Interlingua. Beside these, there are also the irregular prefixes sesqui- 'one-and-a-half-', semi- 'half-', hemi- 'half-' and myria- 'ten-thousand-'.

All of the collective numerals are modelled after dozena 'dozen', and are formed by suffixing -ena to any cardinal numeral.

=== Numeric conventions ===
Decimals should always be written with commas by default, as per ISO recommendations. I.e. 3,1415 and not '3.1415' as in English. Since this would clash with the familiar usage of the comma as the thousands separator in English, this function is switched with the period in Interlingua, or alternatively empty spaces.

Ordinals and adverbials expressed in Arabic numerals are written as follows:

1me '1st', 2nde '2nd', 3tie '3rd', 4te '4th', 5te '5th', 6te '6th', 7me '7th', 8ve '8th', 9ne '9th', 10me '10th', 20me '20th', 100me '100th', etc.

with the adverbials being identical except for ending in -o instead of -e. Alternatively, it is extremely common to simply use the suffixes -e or -o on their own for simplicity.

== Syntax ==
The normal word order in Interlingua is subject–verb–object, though this may be relaxed where the sense is clear.

Ille reface horologios. 'He fixes clocks.'
Amandolos ama io tanto, io comprava un amandoliera. 'I love almonds so much, I bought an almond orchard.'

Pronouns, however, tend to follow the Romance pattern subject–object–verb, except for infinitives and imperatives, where the object follows the verb.

Ille los reface. 'He fixes them.'
Nos vole obtener lo. 'We want to get it.'
Jecta lo via! 'Throw it away!'

When two pronouns, one a direct and one an indirect object, occur with the same verb, the indirect object comes first.

Io les lo inviava per avion. 'I sent it to them by air.'
Io la los inviava per nave. 'I sent them to her by ship.'

The position of adverbs and adverbial phrases is similar to English.

=== Questions ===
Questions can be created in several ways, familiar to French speakers.

- By reversing the position of the subject and verb.

Ha ille arrivate? 'Has he arrived?'
Cognosce tu ben Barcelona? 'Do you know Barcelona well?'
Te place le filmes de Quentin Tarantino? 'Do you like the films of Quentin Tarantino?'

- By replacing the subject with an interrogative word.

Qui ha dicite isto? 'Who said this?'
"Que cadeva super te?" "Un incude." '"What fell on you?" "An anvil."'

- For questions that can be answered with 'yes' or 'no', by adding the particle esque (or rarer an) to the start of the sentence.

Esque illa vermente lassava su fortuna a su catto? (or An illa...) 'Did she really leave her fortune to her cat?'

- By changing the intonation or adding a question mark, while keeping the normal word order.

Tu jam ha finite tu labores? 'You finished your work yet?'

== Irregularities and exceptions ==
These oddities are a part of the standard grammar. These special cases have crept into the language as a result of the effort to keep it naturalistic. Most of these irregularities also exist in Interlingua's source languages; English, French, Italian, Spanish, Portuguese, and to a lesser extent German and Russian. This feature of the language makes Interlingua more familiar to the speakers of source languages. And at the same time, it makes the language more difficult for others.

The speakers of the source languages do not perceive all deviations as irregular. For instance, Interlingua has three different words for English "am" (so), "is" (es) and "are" (son). While most English speakers will not find any thing abnormal about it, speakers of a few other languages may find the use of three words to express the concept of 'simple present' as unnecessary.

Interlingua is notable in the sense that unlike most auxiliary languages, that seek to minimise or eliminate any irregular aspects, Interlingua takes a flexible approach. It is mandatory to use certain exceptions in Interlingua while others have been kept optional.

=== Pronunciation ===
Interlingua does not have a 'one letter one sound' orthography. As in English, several letters can be pronounced in different ways; depending on where they are in a word. For instance, the letter C can be pronounced as either /k/ (canto) or /ts/ (cento). Here is a list of other mandatory exceptions in pronunciation:

| Letter / Digraph | Possible Pronunciations | Rules | Examples |
|---|---|---|---|
| c | /k/ /ts/ (or /s/) | /k/ when c is followed by a, o, u or any consonant' /ts/ (or /s/) when e, i or y come after c | camera, crear acido, Cinderella |
| ch | /k/ /tʃ/ /ʃ/ | like /k/ in words of Greek origin /tʃ/ only in a few words (very rare) /ʃ/ in some words, especially of French origin | cholera, machina Chile, checo chef, brochure, China |
| h | /h/ silent | silent after r and t | horologio rhetorico |
| rh | /r/ | pronounced as the "r" in Spanish caro | rhetorica, rheumatic |
| sh | /ʃ/ | pronounced as "sh" in English | Shakespeare |
| th | /t/ | always pronounced like /t/ | theatro |
| ph | /f/ | always pronounced like /f/ | photographia, photosynthese |
| t | /t/ /ts/ | pronounced as /t/ except when followed by an i and a second vowel in an unstressed syllable, in which case it is realized as /ts/ | tourista creation |
| u | /u/ /w/ | /u/ except when unstressed before a vowel, in which case it can be realized as /w/ | luna, plural persuader, superflue |
| y | /j/ /i/ | /j/ when unstressed before vowels other like /i/ | Yugoslavia, yoga tyranno, typo |

Besides, there are also unassimilated loan words that retain their original pronunciation and spelling.

Diacritics are permitted when they do not influence the pronunciation of the word borrowed into Interlingua. Common examples of such words are radios Röntgen (X rays) and kümmel.

=== Contractions ===
Just as in English, where I am is usually contracted to I'm and he is to he's, such contractions are also found in Interlingua and these two are compulsory to observe:

| Words | Contraction | Example |
|---|---|---|
| de (of) + le (the) | del | del matre (of the mother) |
| a (to) + le (the) | al | al luna (to the moon) |

=== Plurals ===
Plurals can be formed in three different ways depending on the ending of a noun.

| Ending | Add | Example |
|---|---|---|
| ends in a consonant other than c | -es | conversation - conversationes pais - paises |
| ends in c | -hes | roc - roches choc - choches |
| ends in a vowel | -s | radio - radios academia - academias |

There are also irregular plurals that occur in loan words. The common ones are tests (from 'test'), addenda (from 'addendum') and lieder (from 'lied').

=== Numbers ===
Some numbers in Interlingua have irregular construction and/or variants:

| Numbers | Hypothetical logical name | Name used |
|---|---|---|
| 10 | *unanta | dece |
| 20 | *duoanta | vinti |
| 30 | *tresanta | trenta |
| 40 | *quatranta | quaranta |
| 13 | *tresdece | tredece |
| 14 | *quatrodece | quattuordece |
| 15 | *cinquedece | quindece |
| 16 | *sexdece | sedece |

=== Parts of speech ===
- Not all adverbs are derived from adjectives.
- If an adjective ends with -c, an adverb derived from it takes -amente (instead of -mente).
- Sia is the imperative form of esser ('to be'): Sia contente! 'Be content!'

=== Optional ===
==== Pronunciation ====
- if s is between vowels, it can be pronounced [z], like in "these" (instead of the [s] of "stay")
- if x is between vowels, it can be spoken like the [ɡz] in "exact" (instead of like the [ks] in "fox")

==== Optional short form verbs ====
- ha for habe, 'has', 'have'
- va for vade, 'goes', 'go'
- es for esse, 'is', 'am', 'are'

==== Alternative forms of esser ====
Note. These forms are rarely used.

- so for (io) es
- son for (nos/vos/illes/-as/-os) es
- era for esseva
- sera for essera
- serea for esserea

==== Comparative and superlative adjectives ====
- (le) minor instead of (le) plus parve
- (le) major instead of (le) plus magne
- (le) melior instead of (le) plus bon
- (le) pejor instead of (le) plus mal
- minime instead of le plus parve or le minor
- maxime instead of "le plus magne" or "le major"
- optime instead of le plus bon or le melior
- pessime instead of le plus mal or le pejor

== Notes ==
=== Bibliography ===
- Gode, Alexander, and Hugh E. Blair. Interlingua: a grammar of the international language. Storm Publishers, New York, 1951.
- Wilgenhof, Karel. Grammatica de Interlingua. Union Mundial pro Interlingua, 2012.
