= William Collinson =

William Collinson may refer to:

- William Edward Collinson, British linguist
- William Robert Collinson (1912–1995), American federal judge
