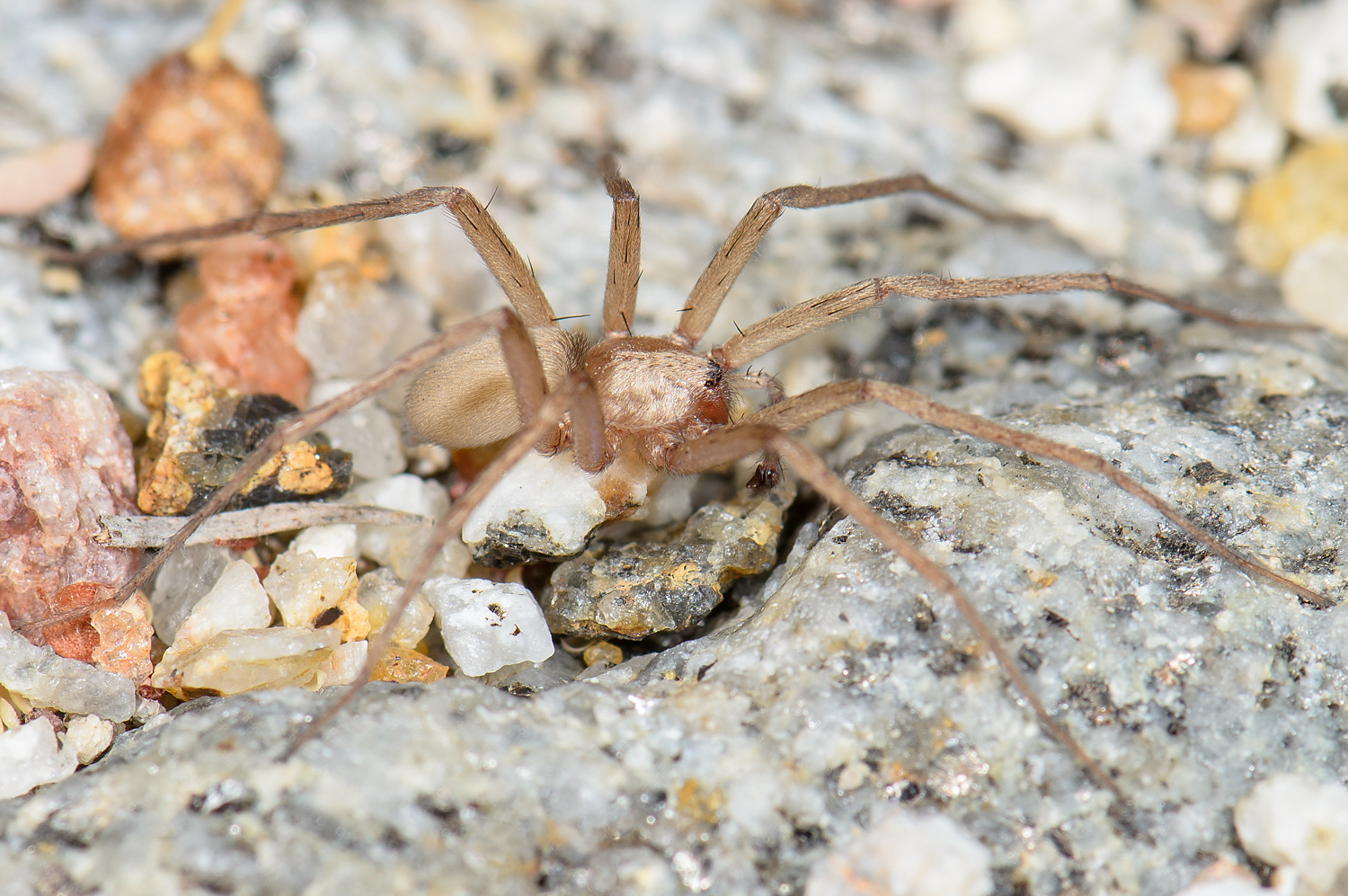
- Neoanagraphis chamberlini

Scientific classification
- Domain: Eukaryota
- Kingdom: Animalia
- Phylum: Arthropoda
- Subphylum: Chelicerata
- Class: Arachnida
- Order: Araneae
- Infraorder: Araneomorphae
- Family: Liocranidae
- Genus: Neoanagraphis; Mulaik

Species
- Neoanagraphis chamberlini Gertsch & Mulaik, 1936; Neoanagraphis pearcei Gertsch, 1941

= Neoanagraphis =

Genus of spiders

Neoanagraphis is a genus of spiders in the family Liocranidae. It was first described in 1936 by Gertsch and Mulaik. As of 2016, it contains two species: N. chamberlini and N. pearcei.
