= Leland B. Yeager =

American economist (1924–2018)

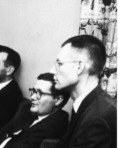
- Tullock and Yeager
- Born: October 4, 1924; Oak Park, Illinois, U.S.
- Died: April 23, 2018 (aged 93); Auburn, Alabama, U.S.

Academic background
- Education: Oberlin College (AB); Columbia University (MA, PhD)
- Doctoral advisors: James W. Angell, Ragnar Nurkse
- Influences: Ludwig von Mises, Murray Rothbard, Friedrich Hayek

Academic work
- Discipline: Monetary policy, international trade
- School or tradition: Virginia School; Austrian School

Leland Bennett Yeager (/ˈjeɪɡər/; October 4, 1924 – April 23, 2018) was an American economist dealing with monetary policy and international trade.

== Biography ==
Yeager graduated from Oberlin College in 1948 with an A.B. and was granted an M.A. from Columbia University in 1949 and a Ph.D. from there in 1952. He had previously served in the United States Army in World War II, translating Japanese codes. He temporarily served as the Vice President of the Interlingua Institute from 1997 to 1998 after Deanna Hammond died. He was a regular contributor to Liberty magazine and an occasional contributor to the "Mises Daily".

He was a professor emeritus at both Auburn University and the University of Virginia. His monetary writings have strongly opposed Keynesian orthodoxy and have emphasized the crucial role of money in business cycles. His 1956 essay, "A Cash-Balance Interpretation of Depression" maintained that depression was caused by "an excess demand for money, in the sense that people want to hold more money than exists." In this, he was a member of the monetarist school exemplified by Milton Friedman.

His subsequent writings tilted towards a laissez-faire approach to monetary reform. In his 1989 paper "Can Monetary Disequilibrium Be Eliminated", he advocated that government "be banished from any role in the monetary system other than that of defining a unit of account or numeraire." Yeager argued in favor of constitutional monarchy.

The month before his death Yeager wrote about the "destructive and ignorant" trade policy of United States President Donald Trump. Yeager died in April 2018 at the age of 93.

=== Interlingua and interlinguistics ===
Outside economics, Yeager was a prominent supporter of Interlingua, the international auxiliary language developed by the International Auxiliary Language Association (IALA). His interest in planned languages began during his high-school years after reading about Esperanto, and he became active in the Interlingua movement shortly after the language's introduction in 1951.

Yeager held several leadership positions within the Interlingua community. He served as a director of the Interlingua Institute from 1984 and was its president from 1989 to 1993. He subsequently served as president of the Union Mundial pro Interlingua (UMI), the principal international organization promoting Interlingua, from 1993 to 1999.

A frequent lecturer at international Interlingua conferences, Yeager advocated the use of Interlingua as a practical medium for discussing academic and professional subjects rather than merely as a topic of linguistic interest. His presentations addressed subjects including economics, interlinguistics, and East Asian linguistics. Together with Ingvar Stenström, he co-edited Tema: Interlinguistica e Interlingua – Discursos Public (1991), a collection of lectures on Interlingua and the theory of international auxiliary languages.

Throughout his life, Yeager published numerous articles and essays concerning Interlingua and language planning, and he was regarded as one of the movement's most prominent intellectual advocates.

== Bibliography ==
- Foreign Trade and U.S. Policy: The Case for Free International Trade (1976) ISBN 0-275-56270-0
- International Monetary Relations: Theory, History and Policy (1976) ISBN 0-06-047323-1
- Proposals for government credit allocation: Evaluative studies in economic policy (1977) ISBN 0-8447-3281-8
- Experiences With Stopping Inflation (1981) ISBN 0-8447-3439-X
- The Fluttering Veil: Essays on Monetary Disequilibrium (1997) ISBN 0-86597-146-3
- Ethics As Social Science: The Moral Philosophy of Social Cooperation (2001) ISBN 1-84064-521-0
- Is the Market a Test of Truth and Beauty? Essays in Political Economy (Full Text). (2012) ISBN 1279974303

== See also ==
- Journal of Libertarian Studies
