= Mulaik =

Mulaik is a surname. Notable people with the surname include:

- Stanley A. Mulaik (born 1935), psychologist and Interlingua proponent
- Stanley B. Mulaik (1902–1995), zoologist and educator
