= Stanley A. Mulaik =

American professor (born 1935)

Stanley Allen Mulaik (born April 9, 1935, in Edinburg, Texas) is Professor Emeritus (retired) at the School of Psychology at the Georgia Institute of Technology, as well as the head of the Societate American pro Interlingua. Although born in Edinburg, Mulaik lived in Salt Lake City, Utah from 1939 to 1966. For the last 42 years, he has lived in or around the Atlanta, Georgia area. He has two sons who live with their families in the Atlanta area.

== Biography ==
Mulaik began his education in 1940 at the kindergarten at the Stewart School, the training school for teachers at the University of Utah. He proceeded through the elementary grades to "graduate" from the 9th grade in 1950. That fall he began high school at East High School in Salt Lake City. At the end of his junior year he applied and was accepted to be a Ford Scholar in a special program at the University of Utah financed by the Ford Foundation that took exceptional students at the end of their junior year in high school and admitted them to the University of Utah as freshman to see if they could handle university level courses. Students in this program performed exceptionally and a major portion of Mulaik's class of Ford Scholars later obtained Ph.D.s in various subjects. Mulaik also entered the Reserve Officers Training Corps at the university and at graduation received a commission of 2nd lieutenant in the Army. He received training in artillery at Fort Bliss, Texas and served in a field artillery battalion in the United States Army Reserve until 1963, and then joined a research and development unit with assignments to The Pentagon until 1970, when he went inactive as a captain.

== Education ==
Mulaik obtained his B.S. (biology and secondary education, 1956), M.A. (psychology, 1962) and Ph.D. (clinical psychology, 1963) from the University of Utah.

== Academic career ==
From 1964 to 1966 he was a research associate with Dr. Calvin W. Taylor (his dissertation chairman) and his wife to be Jane Stacy on a grant titled Measurement and Prediction of Nursing Performance. Working on this project he learned FORTRAN programming and wrote a factor analysis program to conduct analysis of the project's data. He married the co-principal investigator, Jane Stacy, in 1963, and they had two sons, Stephen and Robert. In 1966 he obtained a post doctoral fellowship in quantitative psychology at the L. L. Thurstone Psychometric Laboratory at the University of North Carolina at Chapel Hill. Between 1967 and 1970, he was an assistant professor and taught courses on personality and factor analysis in the Department of Psychology at UNC. In 1970 he took a position as an associate professor in the School of Psychology at the Georgia Institute of Technology and rose to full professor in 1981. He taught courses in introductory statistics, psychometric theory, factor analysis, multivariate statistics, structural equation modelling, personality theory, and introduction to psychology during his career. In 1972 he published the well-received advanced text The Foundations of Factor Analysis.

In 1982 he was second author with Lawrence James and Jean M. Brett of Causal Analysis: Models, Assumptions and Data. In the interim he published journal articles and book chapters on factor analysis, factor indeterminacy in factor analysis, factor rotation, confirmatory factor analysis, psychometric theory, structural equation modeling, and goodness of fit indices. The work on the book on Causal Analysis with James and Brett led him to a deep interest in the philosophy of causality, objectivity and philosophy in general. He struggled through Wittgenstein and Kant to a passable understanding of each, being strongly influenced by Kant's concepts of analysis and synthesis in thought, and saw their role in metaphors of objectivity, causality, and the self. He published several articles in the journal Philosophy of Science on the history of exploratory statistics in empiricism; metaphoric origins of objectivity, subjectivity and consciousness; a synthesis of deterministic and probabilistic causality with the functional relation concept; and the curve-fitting problem and degrees of freedom. He was strongly influenced by the works of George Lakoff on metaphor and abstract thought and their origin in embodied perception and action. As a result, Mulaik has argued that science is based on the metaphor that "science is knowledge of objects". In 1997 he was co-editor with L. Harlow and J. H. Steiger of the book What If There Were No Significance Tests? in which he was the principal author of a chapter with N Raju and R. Harshman defending significance tests in appropriate contexts. In 2009 he published the text Linear Causal Modeling with Structural Equations and in 2010 a revision of the earlier Foundations of Factor Analysis.

== Work with Interlingua ==
His interest in Interlingua came as an undergraduate at the University of Utah in 1953 when he discovered a column in Science News Letter of science abstracts in Interlingua. He wrote an article on Interlingua for the student literary magazine which came to the attention of Alexander Gode, then the leader of the Interlingua Division of Science Service, who asked for and got permission to print the Mulaik's article in official publications. Mulaik then produced a periodical newsletter Le Foro from 1961 to 1963. After marriage and two sons, and assuming an assistant professorship at the University of North Carolina, he set aside interest in Interlingua until about 1994 when he rediscovered Interlingua in a listserv on linguistics in the internet. He turned to an interest in the problem of the grammatical particles in Interlingua which he had in 1961 when he realized that the Latin grammatical particles in Interlingua were not sanctioned by the prototype principle at the base of Interlingua's vocabulary. They were a provisional solution for the particles when an early study in 1939 by Dr. Gode at the International Auxiliary Language Association yielded only 73 particles, an insufficient number. Mulaik determined that the flaw in Gode's study was that he used only 4 source languages, of which English, with Germanic particles, made little contribution to the particles. That left only three romance languages from which to draw particles by the common prototype principle, and if there were less than three of these with a common prototype for a particle, no solution was produced. Mulaik decided that what was needed was to search other minor romance languages for candidates that had a common historical prototype with those in the major romance languages of French, Italian and Spanish/Portuguese. Mulaik chose Catalan/Occitan and Romanian as "supplementary languages" to search in these cases. In 2003 Mulaik completed a study of the particle question with 183 particles sanctioned by the prototype principle or other techniques of Interlingua. In 2012 he published a book Interlingua Grammar and Method for The Use of the International Vocabulary As an International Auxiliary Language, which is available from Amazon.com and other vendors. The book is a detailed development of the grammar and sows his personal methods to determine the vocabulary, with several chapters on texts in Interlingua. The book also has 3248-word glossaries between English and Interlingua and Interlingua and English.

He was the president of the Societate American pro Interlingua, and the editor of its quarterly journal, Confluentes. He was also the editor of the psychological journal Multivariate Behavioral Research for eight years.
