= Earle B. Babcock =

American linguist

Earle B. Babcock was an American linguist. He was a professor in Romance languages and literature and dean in the Graduate School, New York University.

Babcock participated in a series of conferences that took place in 1923 in New York that lead to the foundation of the International Auxiliary Language Association and became its first president. He held the office in years 1924-1935.

== Bibliography ==
- Alexander Gode (1951). Interlingua English Dictionary.
- "Historia de interlingua. Biographias. Earle B. Babcock" (in Interlingua).
- Henry Stanley Schwarz (1924). "Introductory Note". An outline history of French literature.
