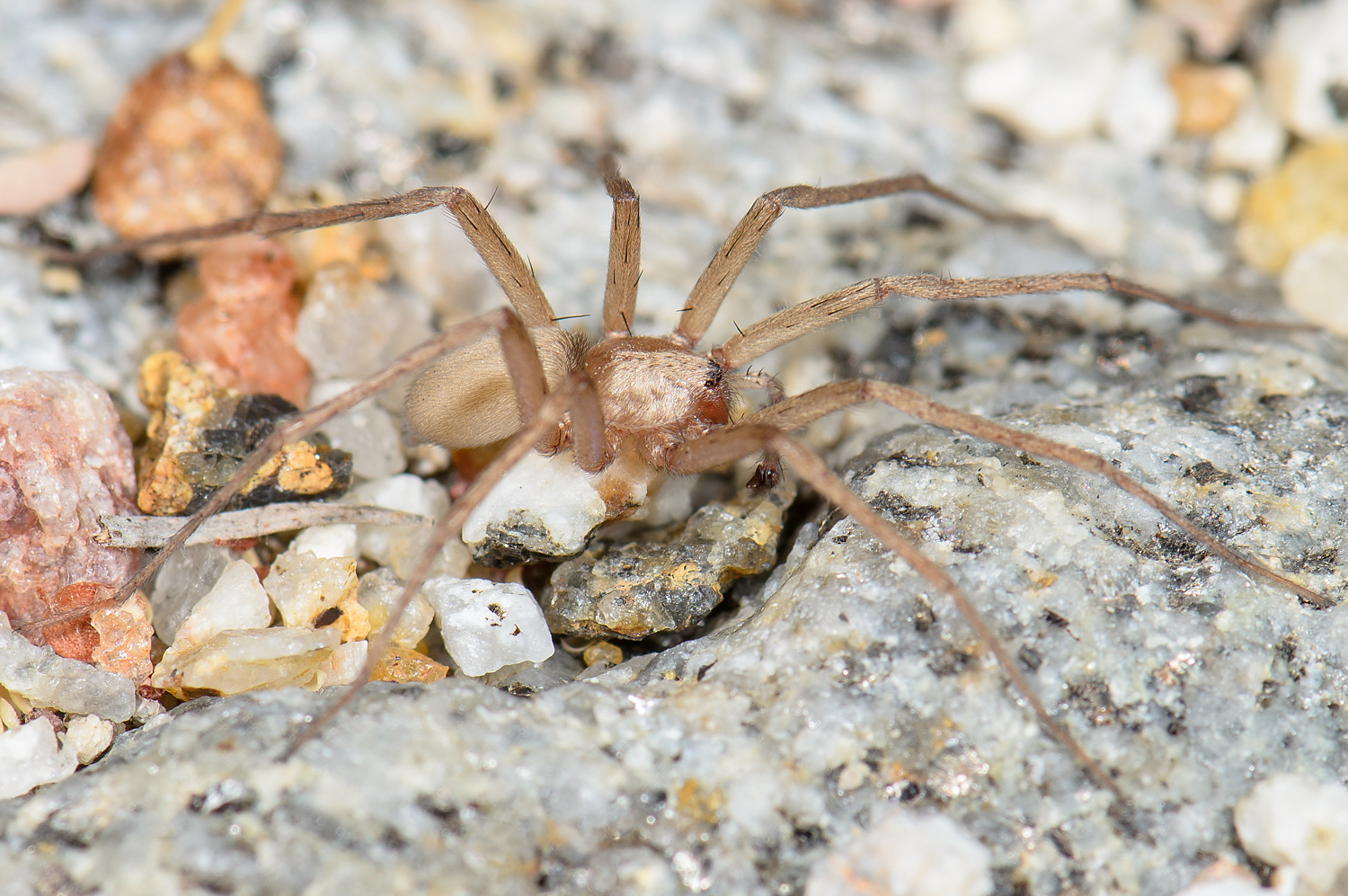

Scientific classification
- Domain: Eukaryota
- Kingdom: Animalia
- Phylum: Arthropoda
- Subphylum: Chelicerata
- Class: Arachnida
- Order: Araneae
- Infraorder: Araneomorphae
- Family: Liocranidae
- Genus: Neoanagraphis
- Species: N. chamberlini

Binomial name
- Neoanagraphis chamberlini Gertsch & Mulaik, 1936

= Neoanagraphis chamberlini =

Species of spider

Neoanagraphis chamberlini is a species of liocranid sac spider in the family Liocranidae. It is found in the United States and Mexico.
