= Interlingua, Instrumento Moderne de Communication International =

Interlingua, Instrumento Moderne de Communication International by Ingvar Stenström is an Interlingua course. As of 2006, it has been translated into Bulgarian, Danish, French, German, Hungarian, Portuguese, Romanian, Russian, and Swedish; translations into Norwegian and Lithuanian are in final preparation, and five additional languages are expected to follow.

Stenström, Secretary of the Swedish Society for Interlingua, wrote the manual to provide uniform material for Interlingua instruction throughout the world. The manual was first published in Swedish by the editorial house Esselte Studium. The Norwegian version was written by Asmund Knutson, President of the Union Norwegian pro Interlingua, in collaboration with Morten Swendsen. The Lithuanian version was written by Vladas Kazlauskas with the typographic assistance of Arne Pedersen.

All versions of the manual are available from the Servicio de Libros of the Union Mundial pro Interlingua.
