= Monetary-disequilibrium theory =

Theory of macroeconomic fluctuations

Monetary disequilibrium theory is a product of the monetarist school and is mainly represented in the works of Leland Yeager and Austrian macroeconomics. The basic concepts of monetary equilibrium and disequilibrium were, however, defined in terms of an individual's demand for cash balance by Mises (1912) in his Theory of Money and Credit.

Monetary disequilibrium is one of three theories of macroeconomic fluctuations which accord an important role to money, the others being the Austrian theory of the business cycle and one based on rational expectations.

== History of the concept ==
Leland Yeager's (1968) understanding of the monetary disequilibrium theory begins with fundamental properties of money.

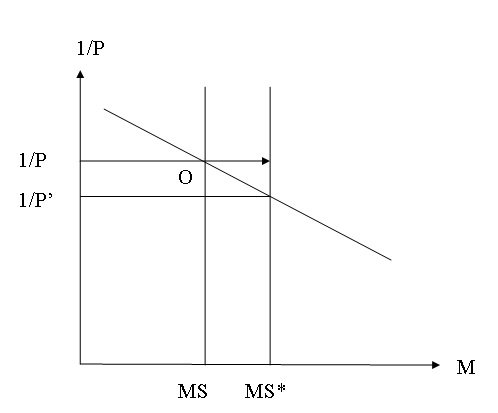
Inflationary monetary-disequilibrium.

The role of money as the generally accepted medium of exchange is one of the most important properties. The other two properties that Yeager emphasized are that the demand for money is a demand to hold real money balances and that the acquisition of money has a "routinenss" to it that distinguishes it from other goods. He actually made effective use of the cash balance approach to the demand for money. When we combine these two properties, we get a distinction between actual and desired money balances. The differences between individuals' actual and desired holdings of money are the proximal causes of them affecting the level of spending in the macroeconomy. These differences between actual and desired money balances appear economy-wide when we have inflation or deflation.

It presents an alternative to the real business cycle model and the quantity theory of money considered only a long-run theory of the price level. While it is widely agreed in economics that monetary policy can influence real activity in the economy, real business cycle theory ignores these effects. The theory also addresses the effects of monetary policy on real sectors of the economy, that is, on the quantity and composition of output.

Monetary-disequilibrium theory states that output, not (or not only) prices and wages, fluctuate with a change in the money supply. To that degree, prices are represented as sticky. It is this "monetary disequilibrium," that, the theory contends, affects the economy in real terms. Thus, changes in the money supply will result first in a change of output in the same direction, as distinct from merely a change in prices. Consequently, an increase in the money supply will induce workers and businesses to supply more, without being fooled into doing so. In a situation where the money supply contracts, businesses will respond by laying off workers. In this way, the theory accounts for involuntary unemployment. The disequilibrium between the supply and demand for money exists as long as nominal supply does not automatically adjust to meet the nominal demand. Monetary-disequilibrium is a short-run phenomenon as it contains within itself the process by which a new equilibrium is established i.e. through changes in the price level. If the demand for real balances changes, either the nominal money supply or price level can adjust to monetary equilibrium in the long run as seen from the figure. From the definition of monetary-disequilibrium movements in the demand for money are responded to the changes in the real money supply through adjustments in the nominal money supply as seen from the movement from point O to A in the figure and not the price level (movement from O to A' in the figure).

The demand for money means demand to hold real cash balances. If the money supply is increased to an amount beyond which the public desires to hold (from MS to MS'), this is interpreted as a movement from O to A, as illustrated in our figure. With the increase in supply of money, people find themselves with larger money balances than they wish to hold and thus reside temporarily at point A. If we assume that there has been no change in the demand for money, these excesses will be spent on goods, services or financial assets thereby increasing their prices, leading to a movement from point A to new equilibrium point B. The increase in the aggregate price level (P* < P') is associated with excess supplies of money which reflects these individual increases. The price level continues to rise with the increase in spending of the excess money balances and eventually reaches point B where the higher nominal supply of money is held at higher price (1/P', where P' > P*). In the long run any supply of money is an equilibrium supply. The long-run movement from equilibrium O to B is shown in the figure.

== Early monetary-equilibrium theory ==
Swedish economist Knut Wicksell (1898) was one of the main propagators of the theory. He was primarily concerned with the behavior of the general price level, as influenced by interest rates. As described by Gunnar Myrdal in 1939, the definition given by Wicksell was based on the existence of three conditions.

First, among them is the equivalence of the "natural" rate of interest and the money rate of interest. The second condition of monetary equilibrium is equilibrium in the capital market. That is the equivalence between the supply of and demand for savings. Finally, the third condition of monetary-equilibrium concerns equilibrium in the commodity market defined as stable price level.

Myrdal however has a different stand all together on this. He does admit the possibility that an increase in savings might decrease the money interest rate thereby increasing the investment but does think this to be a very strong factor and therefore misses the equilibrating function of the interest rates in the capital market.

Two important points regarding monetary-equilibrium needs to be stated. First, there is no necessary relationship between monetary and general equilibrium. It is totally compatible with disequilibria in various markets for goods and services. Second, monetary-equilibrium can be seen as a desirable policy goal by monetary regimes.

== Monetary-equilibrium in the Austrian school ==
The concept of monetary-equilibrium is basically a European one. Much of the work on this doctrine has been done by Swedish, British and Austrian economists. The whole approach begins with the work of Knut Wicksell in the development of the concepts of natural and market rates of interest. Wicksell believed that if the two rates are equal then the price level will be constant and any difference in the two rates will manifest themselves as changes in the value of money. Wicksell's work had a clear Austrian connection as he relied on Eugen Ritter von Böhm-Bawerk's theory of capital in developing the concepts. The representative of the British monetary-equilibrium approach was mainly Dennis Robertson.

Mises relationship to the theory is ambiguous. According to Ludwig von Mises, monetary equilibrium happens first at the individual level. Each actor wants to keep a cash balance on hand for future transactions, say, both planned and contingent. This desired money balance of the individual constitutes his money demand and is based on his subjective valuation of holding money compared to their valuation of obtaining more goods and services. The amount of the money that the individual possess is his supply of money. Individuals will try to equate their desired and actual cash holdings through their spending behavior.

== Synthesis of the Yeager and Austrian theory ==
Monetary disequilibrium theory has always been a part of the Austrian monetary theory. Significant features of the monetary-disequilibrium theory except the inclusion of the stable price level have been present in the Austrian theory for a long time. Mostly modern Austrian economists emphasize the effects of inflation more than the harm caused by rapid deflation. This is mainly because inflation is a more immediate problem in the current system and deflation is a result of prior inflation.

== Monetary-equilibrium, loanable funds and interest rates ==
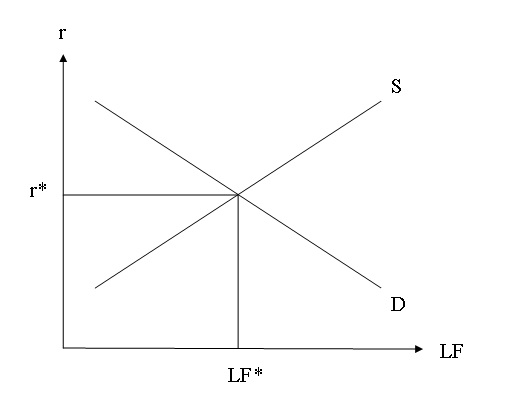
The loanable funds market.

In case of loanable funds market, we need to discuss to concepts ex-ante and ex-post. Ex-ante is what people desire, and ex-post is what happens in the market process. In case of market equilibrium what demanders wish to do is exactly equal to what suppliers wish to do. This has been shown in the figure. The equilibrium here is ex-ante. However, it does not guarantee that ex-post will match it especially if entrepreneurs are prevented from finding the price that will bring equilibrium in the market. Let us take the case of price ceiling. At that price quantity demanded will exceed the quantity supplied resulting in an ex-ante disequilibrium.

If the market process proceeds in this scenario, we will see that the amount bought equals the amount sold and there is an ex-post equality. This happens because demanders are unable to make their demands effective due to the price ceiling.

In loanable funds market equilibrium ex-ante plans of savers and investors match precisely. The monetary equilibrium has implications for the rate of interest as there is a distinction between market rate of interest and natural rate of interest. The market rate of interest is the rate that the banks are actually charging in the loanable funds market while natural rate of interest corresponds to the time preferences of savers and borrowers as expressed in demand-supply presentation for loanable funds (r* in the figure).

The monetary system is not a source of disturbance when there is monetary equilibrium but at the time of monetary disequilibrium the system becomes a source of disequilibrium by distorting the sources generated during the process of turning time-preferences into the demand and supply for loanable funds. For ex-ante and ex-post quantities to be equal someone has to lose out. In addition, the adjustment process entails significant social costs. Now, let us suppose there is an excess supply in the market. Banks will create more loanable funds than people's real willingness to save as determined by their time preferences. This will result in a fall in the market rate of interest as banks will try to lure new borrowers with their excess money supply, but the natural rate remains the same as no additional supply of loanable funds have come from the public.

== Monetary equilibrium, classics and Keynes ==
The monetary-equilibrium framework is in some ways not at all different from the classical model. The three central theories of the classical school are Say's law, quantity theory of money and the role of interest rates.

Say's law (supply creates its own demand) implies that aggregate supply would always be equal to aggregate demand. The argument was that the sales of goods in the market produces the necessary income to buy that supply. This view was a part of the belief in laissez-faire that government intervention is not required to prevent general shortages. Say's law finds its most accurate expression in monetary equilibrium. In monetary-equilibrium, production is truly the source of demand but if there is an excess demand for money this does not happen as some potential productivity has not been translated into effective demand. If there is an excess supply of money then demand comes not only from previous production but also from the possession of the excess supply.

The quantity theory of money explained the general price level whereas other microeconomic factors explained relative prices. With relative prices being explained by resources and tastes, the possibilities of shortages excluded by Say's law and quantity theory of money being explained by the price level, the only missing factor was the intertemporal exchange.

=== Example ===
In the simplest model, income Y is made up of either Consumption (C) or Saving (S) while expenditure (Yi) were either on consumption or investment goods. Here, we ignore government and foreign trade. This can be seen from equation 1. Now, if the preferences of the income earners shift towards the future resulting in a fall in C and increase in S as shown in equation 2. In the simple classical model increase in savings cause a fall in the interest rates thereby inducing additional investment expenditure. This increase in Investment (I) implies a fall in (C) on the expenditure side as shown in equation 3. As given Ci= Ce, the increase in investment is equal to the increase in savings and a shift in intertemporal preferences does not disrupt the equality between income and expenditure and also there is no change in income. (Equation4)

1. Yi = Ci + S = Ye= Ce+ I.
2. Yi = C↓+S↑
3. Ye = Ce↓+I↑
4. If S = I then Yi = Ye.

Thus, we can see that monetary-equilibrium shares a lot with the classical model.

== Problems with monetary-disequilibrium theory ==
1. According to Yeager, monetary-disequilibrium is a part of the monetarist tradition which states that "money matters the most" which cannot be true as in terms of economic analysis actors matter most.
2. The static definition of equilibrium at the heart of monetary-disequilibrium theory is flawed as he uses a very neoclassical definition on the macro-economic level i.e. he talks about constant price level.
3. Yeager does not take into consideration that business cycles start not just with monetary-disequilibrium but happen when that disequilibrium enters the market for loanable funds and produces disequilibrium there, such that the supply of lonable funds exceeds real savings.
4. As the name suggests the monetary-disequilibrium theory is a strictly monetary explanation of a set of economic phenomenon. It does not take into account the real economic factors like real savings or market processes that influence business cycles.
