= William Edward Collinson =

British linguist (1889–1969)

William Edward Collinson (4 January 1889 – 4 May 1969) was a British linguist and, from 1914 to 1954, Chair of German at the University of Liverpool. Like Edward Sapir and Otto Jespersen, he collaborated with Alice Vanderbilt Morris to develop the research program of the International Auxiliary Language Association (IALA). From 1936 to 1939, he was Research Director of IALA. Under Collinson's guidance, methods of compiling international word material were tested at Liverpool. In 1939 IALA moved from Liverpool to New York and E. Clark Stillman succeeded Collinson as Research Director. Alexander Gode, editor of the first English-Interlingua dictionary published in 1951, remained in contact with Collinson which had collected much of linguistic material in the University of Liverpool.

Collinson wrote a popularization book in Esperanto about linguistics : La Homa Lingvo ("The Human Language") in 1927. He was also a collaborator of Centro por Esploro kaj Dokumentado and Internacia Scienca Universitato where he gave 7 lectures. He was chairman of Internacia Scienca Asocio Esperantista 1959-1965 and a longtime member of the Akademio de Esperanto.

He was the joint author of The German Language (with R. Priebsch) first published in 1934; fifth edition Faber & Faber, 1962.

== Literature ==
Falk, Julia S. "Words without grammar: Linguists and the international language movement in the United States," Language and Communication, 15(3): pp. 241–259. Pergamon, 1995.
