= E. Clark Stillman =

Ezra Clark Stillman
- Born: 1907
- Died: 1995 (aged 87–88); New York City
- Occupation: Linguist

Ezra Clark Stillman (1907–1995) laid out the criteria for extracting and standardizing the vocabulary of Interlingua. In 1937, Stillman replaced William Edward Collinson as director of research at the International Auxiliary Language Association (IALA), which presented Interlingua to the public in 1951.

Stillman, who favored a naturalistic approach to interlinguistics, rekindled trust in the impartiality of IALA's work. When World War II forced the Association to relocate to New York, Stillman established a new international staff there and led its intensive linguistic research until he obtained a position with the State Department in 1942. He was succeeded at IALA by Alexander Gode.

Outside of his involvement in the IALA, he worked for the Belgian American Educational Foundation and collected rare books. He was also a partner in the rare book dealing company Lathrop C. Harper Inc. and his personal book collection was displayed in the Pierpoint Morgan Library.

Stillman died in New York City after a long struggle with cancer.
