= Interlingua: A Grammar of the International Language =

1951 book on Interlingua grammar by the International Auxiliary Language Association

Interlingua: A Grammar of the International Language, sometimes called the Interlingua Grammar, is the first grammar of Interlingua. Released in 1951 by the International Auxiliary Language Association (IALA), it remains an authoritative reference work for Interlingua speakers and students of linguistics.

Its subtitle, referring to a grammar of the international language, reflects a position of authors Alexander Gode and Hugh Edward Blair that Interlingua is a pre-existing reality, but that differing portrayals of that reality are possible. The idea of Interlingua as pre-existing within national languages gains support from naturalistic experiments in which speakers of several languages, most notably Romance languages and English, understand written or spoken Interlingua without prior study.

The IALA crafted Interlingua: A Grammar of the International Language as a companion to the 1951 Interlingua-English Dictionary, the first major presentation of Interlingua to the general public.
