= Interlingua–English Dictionary =

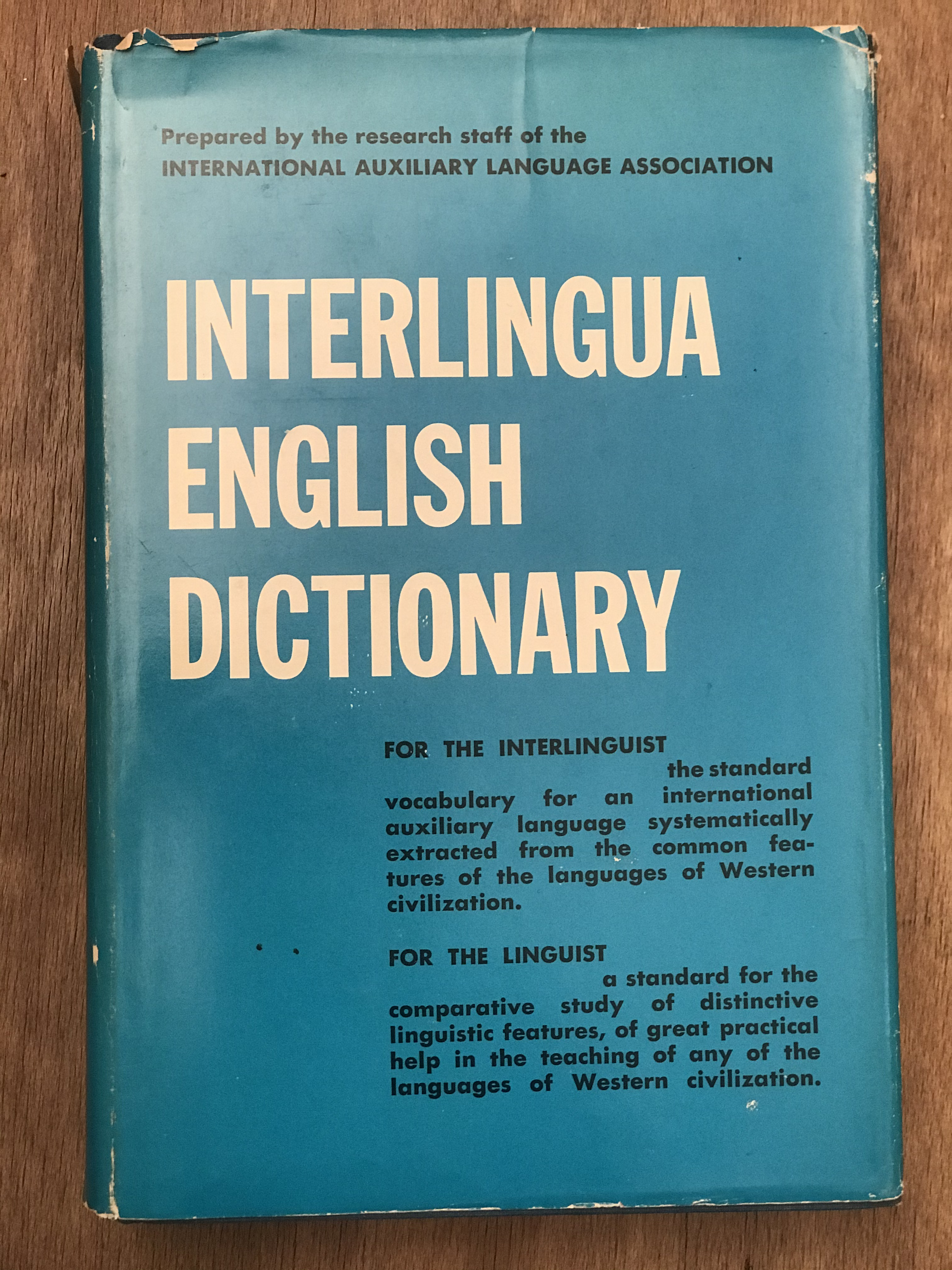

The Interlingua–English Dictionary (IED), developed by the International Auxiliary Language Association (IALA) under the direction of Alexander Gode and published by Storm Publishers in 1951, is the world's first Interlingua dictionary. Its full title is Interlingua: A Dictionary of the International Language.

The IED includes about 27,000 words drawn from about 10,000 roots, but the bulk is given by about 600 classical Latin roots, being an Anglo-Latin dictionary with English as the primary control language of the biggest Romance languages (Italian, Latin, French, Spanish, excluding Portuguese and Romanian).

For each etymological family the dictionary highlights the word in simple form followed by very many cognate words. This method of condensing in a framework the etymological derivation has been taken up by the best multilingual and etymological modern dictionaries.

The IED also presents 125 affixes that facilitate to understand the neolatin linguistic word-formation.

The foreword, written by Mary Connell Bray, briefly recounts the history of interlinguistics and IALA. The Introduction, written by Gode, explains the theory and principles of Interlingua and explores in depth the derivation procedures used to obtain a widely international vocabulary.

Dictionary entries bring out the connections among words in the same word family, showing the Anglo-Latin prefixed words, making the IED a useful resource for linguists, interlinguists, and others interested in language and linguistics.
