= Panorama in Interlingua =

Panorama in Interlingua is the primary periodical for the language Interlingua, published bimonthly. It was first issued in January 1988. The magazine is based in Odense, Denmark, and is written completely in Interlingua and the activities of the Union Mundial pro Interlingua (UMI) appear in each issue, but the content is not necessarily about the language itself. Thomas Breinstrup, the editor in chief, is considered a leader of Interlingua style.

The stated aim of the publication is to carry:

- news of Interlingua
- journalism
- news reports
- book reviews
- travel news and articles
- chronicles
