= Stanley B. Mulaik =

- Born: September 30, 1902
- Died: March 17, 1995 (aged 92)
- Scientific career
- Fields: Arachnology
- Institutions: University of Utah

Stanley B. Mulaik (September 30, 1902 – March 17, 1995) was an American zoologist and educator. He was born in Pittsburgh, Pennsylvania to Lithuanian parents. He received a bachelor's degree in science education and worked as a school teacher for several years until commencing his PhD studies at the University of Utah in 1939. His dissertation presented several new species and genera of isopods and demonstrated that isopods were native to the Americas, rather than introduced from the Old World as previously thought.

He was appointed as an assistant (and later associate) professor at the University of Utah, where he taught courses in nature study, conservation, the teaching of biology, museum techniques, and arthropod anatomy. He was elected a fellow of the American Association for the Advancement of Science, and was a Director of the Conservation Education Association from 1954 to 1957.

He was jointly or separately involved in describing over 200 new species of spiders, isopods, scorpions and mites. For his taxonomic work he often collaborated with his wife Dorothea D. Mulaik (1900-1996). The Mulaiks are commemorated in the names of several organisms, including nine spider species from Texas.
