= Interlingua =

Constructed language

- interlingua
- Interlingua flag
- Pronunciation: [inteɾˈliŋɡwa]
- Created by: International Auxiliary Language Association
- Date: 1951
- Setting and usage: Scientific registration of international vocabulary; international auxiliary language
- Users: A few hundred (2007)
- Purpose: International auxiliary language: Interlingua
- Writing system: Latin script
- Sources: Source languages: English, French, Italian, Portuguese, and Spanish.

Official status
- Regulated by: No regulating body

Language codes
- ISO 639-1: ia
- ISO 639-2: ina
- ISO 639-3: ina
- Glottolog: inte1239

Interlingua (/ɪntərˈlɪŋɡwə/, Interlingua: [inteɾˈliŋɡwa]) is an international auxiliary language (IAL) developed between 1937 and 1951 by the American International Auxiliary Language Association (IALA). It is a constructed language of the "naturalistic" variety, whose vocabulary, grammar, and other characteristics are derived from natural languages. Interlingua proponents maintain that (written) Interlingua is comprehensible to the over 900 million native speakers of Romance languages, though it is actively spoken by only a few hundred.

Interlingua was developed to combine a simple, mostly regular grammar with a vocabulary common to a wide range of western European languages, making it easy to learn for those whose native languages were sources of Interlingua's vocabulary and grammar.

The name Interlingua comes from the Latin words inter, meaning 'between', and lingua, meaning 'tongue' or 'language'. These morphemes are the same in Interlingua; thus, Interlingua means 'between language'.

== Overview ==
Interlingua focuses on common vocabulary shared by Western European languages, which are often descended from or heavily influenced by Latin (such as the Romance languages) and Greek. Interlingua organizers have four "primary control languages" where, by default, a word (or variant thereof) is expected to appear in at least three of them to qualify for inclusion in Interlingua: English; French; Italian; and a combination of Spanish and Portuguese, which are treated as a single "mega-language" for Interlingua purposes. Additionally, German and Russian have been dubbed "secondary control languages". While the result is often akin to Neo-Latin as the most frequent source of commonality, Interlingua words can have origins in any language, as long as they have drifted into the primary control languages as loanwords. For example, the Japanese words geisha and samurai and the Finnish word sauna are used in most Western European languages, and therefore in Interlingua as well; similarly, the Guugu Yimithirr word gangurru is used in latinized form (Interlingua: kanguru, English: kangaroo).

The maintainers of Interlingua attempt to keep the grammar simple and word formation regular, and use only a small number of roots and affixes. This is intended to make the language quicker to learn.

== History ==
The American heiress Alice Vanderbilt Morris (1874–1950) became interested in linguistics and the international auxiliary language movement in the early 1920s. In 1924, Morris and her husband, Dave Hennen Morris, established the non-profit International Auxiliary Language Association (IALA) in New York City. Their aim was to place the study of IALs on a more complex and scientific basis. Morris developed the research programme of IALA in consultation with Edward Sapir, William Edward Collinson, and Otto Jespersen.

Investigations of the auxiliary language problem were in progress at the International Research Council, the American Council on Education, the American Council of Learned Societies, the British, French, Italian, and American Associations for the advancement of science, and other groups of specialists. Morris created IALA as a continuation of this work.

=== International Auxiliary Language Association ===
The IALA became a major supporter of mainstream American linguistics. Numerous studies by Sapir, Collinson, and Morris Swadesh in the 1930s and 1940s, for example, were funded by IALA. Alice Morris edited several of these studies and provided much of IALA's financial support. For example, Morris herself edited Sapir and Morris Swadesh's 1932 cross-linguistic study of ending-point phenomena, and Collinson's 1937 study of indication. IALA also received support from groups such as the Carnegie Corporation, the Ford Foundation, the Research Corporation, and the Rockefeller Foundation.

In its early years, IALA concerned itself with three tasks: finding other organizations around the world with similar goals; building a library of books about languages and interlinguistics; and comparing extant IALs, including Esperanto, Esperanto II, Ido, Peano's Interlingua (Latino sine flexione), Novial, and Interlingue (Occidental). In pursuit of the last goal, it conducted parallel studies of these languages, with comparative studies of national languages.

At the Second International Interlanguage Congress, held in Geneva in 1931, IALA began to break new ground; 27 recognized linguists signed a testimonial of support for IALA's research programme. An additional eight added their signatures at the third congress, convened in Rome in 1933. That same year, Herbert N. Shenton and Edward Thorndike became influential in IALA's work by authoring studies in the interlinguistic field.

The first steps towards the finalization of Interlingua were taken in 1937, when a committee of 24 linguists from 19 universities published Some Criteria for an International Language and Commentary. However, the outbreak of World War II in 1939 cut short the intended biannual meetings of the committee.

=== Development of a new language ===
Originally, the association had not intended to create its own language. Its goal was to identify which auxiliary language already available was best suited for international communication, and how to promote it more effectively. However, after ten years of research, many members of IALA concluded that none of the existing interlanguages were up to the task. By 1937, the members had made the decision to create a new language, to the surprise of the world's interlanguage community.

To that point, much of the debate had been equivocal on the decision to use naturalistic (e.g., Peano's Interlingua, Novial and Occidental) or systematic (e.g., Esperanto and Ido) words. During the war years, proponents of a naturalistic interlanguage won out. The first support was Thorndike's paper; the second was a concession by proponents of the systematic languages that thousands of words were already present in many, or even a majority, of the European languages. Their argument was that systematic derivation of words was a Procrustean bed, forcing the learner to unlearn and re-memorize a new derivation scheme when a usable vocabulary was already available. IALA from that point assumed the position that a naturalistic language would be best.

IALA's research activities were based in Liverpool, before relocating to New York due to the outbreak of World War II, where E. Clark Stillman established a new research staff. Stillman, with the assistance of Alexander Gode, constructed the methodology for selecting Interlingua vocabulary based on a comparison of control languages.

In 1943 Stillman left for war work and Gode became Acting Director of Research. IALA began to develop models of the proposed language, the first of which were presented in Morris's General Report in 1945.

=== The four models ===
From 1946 to 1948, French linguist André Martinet was Director of Research. During this period IALA continued to develop models and conducted polling to determine the optimal form of the final language. In 1946, IALA sent an extensive survey to more than 3,000 language teachers and related professionals on three continents.

Model P was unchanged from 1945; Model M was relatively modern in comparison to more classical P. Model K was slightly modified in the direction of Ido. The resulting four models that were canvassed were:

Model P	highly naturalistic, with word forms unchanged from the prototypes; similar to Latin
Model M	moderately naturalistic, similar to variant C
Model C	slightly schematic, similar to Occidental
Model K	moderately schematic, similar to Ido or Esperanto but without their perceived flaws.

An example sentence:

Model P	highly naturalistic	Jo habe nascite, o dea cum le oculos azure, de parentes barbare, inter le bone et virtuose Cimmerios
Model M	moderately naturalistic	Io have nascit, o dea con le ocules azur, de parentes barbar, inter le bon e virtuos Cimmerios
Model C	slightly schematic	Yo ha nascet, o deessa con le ocules azur, de parentes barbar, inter le bon e virtuose Cimerios
Model K	moderately schematic	Yo naskeba, o dea kon le okuli azure, de parenti barbare, inter le bone e virtuose Kimerii
(modern Interlingua)		Io ha nascite, o dea con le oculos azur, de parentes barbare, inter le bon e virtuose Cimmerios
(English)		'I was born, O goddess with the blue eyes, of barbarian relations, among the good and virtuous Cimmerians'

The vote total ended up as follows: P 26.6%, M 37.5%, C 20%, and K 15%. The two more schematic models, C and K, were rejected. Of the two naturalistic models, M attracted somewhat more support than P. Taking national biases into account (for example, the French who were polled disproportionately favoured Model M), IALA decided on a compromise between models M and P, with certain elements of C.

=== Finalization ===
The German-American Gode and the French Martinet did not get along. Martinet resigned and took up a position at Columbia University in 1948, and Gode took on the last phase of Interlingua's development. His task was to combine elements of Model M and Model P; take the flaws seen in both by the polled community and repair them with elements of Model C as needed; and develop a vocabulary. Alice Vanderbilt Morris died in 1950, and the funding that had sustained IALA ceased, but sufficient funds remained to publish a dictionary and grammar. The vocabulary and grammar of Interlingua were first presented in 1951, when IALA published the finalized Interlingua Grammar and the Interlingua–English Dictionary (IED). In 1954, IALA published an introductory manual entitled Interlingua a Prime Vista ("Interlingua at First Sight").

Interlingua as presented by the IALA is very close to Peano's Interlingua (Latino sine flexione), both in its grammar and especially in its vocabulary. A distinct abbreviation was adopted: IA instead of IL.

=== Interlingua's first decades ===
An early practical application of Interlingua was the scientific newsletter Spectroscopia Molecular, published from 1952 to 1980. In 1954, the Second World Cardiological Congress in Washington, D.C. released summaries of its talks in both English and Interlingua. Within a few years, it found similar use at nine further medical congresses. Between the mid-1950s and the late 1970s, some thirty scientific and medical journals provided article summaries in Interlingua. Gode wrote a monthly column in Interlingua in the Science Newsletter published by the Science Service from the early 1950s until his death in 1970.

IALA closed its doors in 1953 but was not formally dissolved until 1956 or later. Its role in promoting Interlingua was largely taken on by Science Service, which hired Gode as head of its newly formed Interlingua Division. Hugh E. Blair, Gode's close friend and colleague, became his assistant. A successor organization, the Interlingua Institute, was founded in 1970 to promote Interlingua in the US and Canada. The new institute supported the work of other linguistic organizations, made considerable scholarly contributions and produced Interlingua summaries for scholarly and medical publications. One of its largest achievements was two immense volumes on phytopathology produced by the American Phytopathological Society in 1976 and 1977.

Beginning in the 1980s, UMI has held international conferences every two years (typical attendance at the earlier meetings was 50 to 100) and launched a publishing programme that eventually produced over 100 volumes. Several Scandinavian schools undertook projects that used Interlingua as a means of teaching the international scientific and intellectual vocabulary.

In 2000, the Interlingua Institute was dissolved amid funding disputes with the UMI; the American Interlingua Society, established the following year, succeeded the institute.

=== Interlingua today ===
Examples of literature in Interlingua.

The original goal of an interlanguage meant for global events has faced competition from English as a lingua franca and International English in the 21st century. The scientific community frequently uses English in international conferences and publications, for example, rather than Interlingua. However, the rise of the Internet has made it easier for the general public with an interest in constructed languages to learn Interlingua. Interlingua is promoted internationally by the Union Mundial pro Interlingua. Periodicals and books are produced by national organizations, such as the Societate American pro Interlingua, the Svenska Sällskapet för Interlingua, and the Union Brazilian pro Interlingua.

Panorama in Interlingua is the most prominent of several Interlingua periodicals. It is a 28-page magazine published bimonthly that covers current events, science, editorials, and Interlingua.

== Community ==
It is not certain how many people have an active knowledge of Interlingua. Most constructed languages other than Esperanto have very few speakers. The Hungarian census of 2001, which collected information about languages spoken, found just two people in the entire country who claimed to speak Interlingua.

Advocates say that Interlingua's greatest advantage is that it is the most widely understood international auxiliary language besides Interlingua (IL) de A.p.I. by virtue of its naturalistic (as opposed to schematic) grammar and vocabulary, allowing those familiar with a Romance language, and educated speakers of English, to read and understand it without prior study.

Interlingua web pages include editions of Wikipedia and Wiktionary, and a number of periodicals, including Panorama in Interlingua from the Union Mundial pro Interlingua (UMI).

Every two years, the UMI organizes an international conference in a different country. In the year between, the Scandinavian Interlingua societies co-organize a conference in Sweden, as a number of Interlingua speakers are in Scandinavia. National organizations such as the Union Brazilian pro Interlingua also organize regular conferences.

Interlingua is taught in some high schools and universities, sometimes as a means of teaching other languages quickly, presenting interlinguistics, or introducing an international vocabulary. A two-week course was taught at the University of Granada in Spain in 2007, for example.

== Orthography ==
Interlingua has a largely phonemic orthography.

=== Interlingua alphabet ===
Interlingua uses the 26 letters of the ISO basic Latin alphabet with no diacritics. The alphabet, pronunciation in IPA and letter names in Interlingua are:

Interlingua alphabet
Number	1	2	3	4	5	6	7	8	9	10	11	12	13	14	15	16	17	18	19	20	21	22	23	24	25	26
Letters (upper case)	A	B	C	D	E	F	G	H	I	J	K	L	M	N	O	P	Q	R	S	T	U	V	W	X	Y	Z
Letters (lower case)	a	b	c	d	e	f	g	h	i	j	k	l	m	n	o	p	q	r	s	t	u	v	w	x	y	z
IPA	a	b	k, t͡s~t͡ʃ (Note: c is pronounced [t͡s] (or optionally [s]) before e, i, y.) (Note: ch is pronounced /ʃ/ in words of French origin e.g. chef = /ʃef/ meaning 'chief' or 'chef', /k/ in words of Greek and Italian origin e.g. choro = /koro/ meaning 'chorus' and more rarely /t͡ʃ/ in words of English or Spanish origin as in Chile /t͡ʃile/ (the country Chile). Ch may be pronounced either /t͡ʃ/ or /ʃ/ depending on the speaker in many cases e.g. chocolate may be pronounced either /t͡ʃokolate/ or /ʃokolate/.) (Note: There is no consensus on how to pronounce sc before e, i, y, as in scientia 'science', though [st͡s] is common.)	d	e	f	ɡ (Note: Unlike any of the Romance languages, g is /g/ even before e, i, y, but in -age it is /(d)ʒ/ (i.e. like j), as it is in several words of French origin such as orange /oranʒe/ and mangiar /manʒar/)	h~∅	i	ʒ	k	l	m	n	o	p	k (Note: q only appears in the digraph qu, which is pronounced [kw] (but [k] in the conjunction and pronoun que and pronoun qui and in terms derived from them such as anque and proque).)	r	s~z (Note: a single s between vowels is often pronounced like z, but pronunciation is irregular.)	t (Note: t is generally [t], but ti followed by a vowel, unless stressed or preceded by s, is pronounced the same as c (that is, [t͡sj] or [sj]).)	u	v	w~v	ks	i	z
Names	a	be	ce	de	e	ef	ge	ha	i	jota	ka	el	em	en	o	pe	cu	er	es	te	u	ve	duple ve	ix	ypsilon	zeta

=== Collateral orthography ===
The book Grammar of Interlingua defines in §15 a "collateral orthography" that defines how a word is spelt in Interlingua once assimilated regardless of etymology.

== Phonology ==
Spoken Interlingua

Interlingua is primarily a written language, and the pronunciation is not entirely settled. The sounds in parentheses are not used by all speakers.

	Labial		Alveolar		Post- alveolar		Palatal	Velar		Glottal
Nasal	m		n							
Plosive	p	b	t	d				k	ɡ	
Affricate			(ts ~ tʃ)			(d)ʒ				
Fricative	f	v	s	z	ʃ	(d)ʒ				(h)
Approximant			l				j	w		
Rhotic			r							

	Front	Back
Close	i	u
Close-mid	e	o
Open	a	

=== Pronunciation ===
For the most part, consonants are pronounced as in English, while the vowels are like Spanish. Written double consonants may be geminated as in Italian for extra clarity or pronounced as single as in English or French. Interlingua has five falling diphthongs, /ai/, /au/, /ei/, /eu/, and /oi/, although /ei/ and /oi/ are rare.

=== Stress ===
The general rule is that stress falls on the vowel before the last consonant (e.g., lingua, 'language', esser, 'to be', requirimento, 'requirement') ignoring the final plural -(e)s (e.g. linguas, the plural of lingua, still has the same stress as the singular), and where that is not possible, on the first vowel (via, 'way', io crea, 'I create'). There are a few exceptions, and the following rules account for most of them:

- Adjectives and nouns ending in a vowel followed by -le, -ne, or -re are stressed on the third-last syllable (fragile, margine, altere 'other', but illa impone 'she imposes').
- Words ending in -ica/-ico, -ide/-ido and -ula/-ulo, are stressed on the third-last syllable (politica, scientifico, rapide, stupido, capitula, seculo 'century').
- Words ending in -ic are stressed on the second-last syllable (cubic).

Speakers may pronounce all words according to the general rule mentioned above. For example, kilometro is acceptable, although kilometro is more common.

=== Phonotactics ===
Interlingua has no explicitly defined phonotactics. However, the prototyping procedure for determining Interlingua words, which strives for internationality, should in general lead naturally to words that are easy for most learners to pronounce. In the process of forming new words, an ending cannot always be added without a modification of some kind in between. A good example is the plural -s, which is always preceded by a vowel to prevent the occurrence of a hard-to-pronounce consonant cluster at the end. If the singular does not end in a vowel, the final -s becomes -es.

=== Loanwords ===
Unassimilated foreign loanwords, or borrowed words, are spelled as in their language of origin. Their spelling may contain diacritics, or accent marks. If the diacritics do not affect pronunciation, they are removed.

== Vocabulary ==
The maintainers of Interlingua select words for it based on their presence and commonality in languages dubbed 'control' languages. These are Spanish, Portuguese, Italian, French, and English, with German and Russian dubbed as secondary controls. An Interlingua word's origin can be from any language so long as it has spread to the control languages. Spanish and Portuguese, both West Iberian languages, are treated as one unit. The largest number of Interlingua words are of Latin origin, with the Greek and Germanic languages providing the second and third largest number. The remainder of the vocabulary originates in Slavic languages and non-Indo-European languages.

=== Eligibility ===
A word, that is a form with meaning, is eligible for the Interlingua vocabulary if it is verified by at least three of the four primary control languages. Either secondary control language can substitute for a primary language. Any word of Indo-European origin found in a control language can contribute to the eligibility of an international word. In some cases, the archaic or potential presence of a word can contribute to its eligibility.

A word can be potentially present in a language when a derivative is present, but the word itself is not. English proximity, for example, gives support to Interlingua proxime, meaning 'near, close'. This counts as long as one or more control languages actually have this basic root word, which the Romance languages all do. Potentiality also occurs when a concept is represented as a compound or derivative in a control language, the morphemes that make it up are themselves international, and the combination adequately conveys the meaning of the larger word. An example is Italian fiammifero (lit. 'flamebearer'), meaning 'match, lucifer', which leads to Interlingua flammifero, or 'match'. This word is thus said to be potentially present in the other languages although they may represent the meaning with a single morpheme.

Words do not enter the Interlingua vocabulary solely because cognates exist in a sufficient number of languages. If their meanings have become different over time, they are considered different words for the purpose of Interlingua eligibility. If they still have one or more meanings in common, however, the word can enter Interlingua with this smaller set of meanings.

If this procedure did not produce an international word, the word for a concept was originally taken from Latin (see below). This only occurred with a few grammatical particles.

=== Form ===
The form of an Interlingua word is considered an international prototype with respect to the other words. On the one hand, it should be neutral, free from characteristics peculiar to one language. On the other hand, it should maximally capture the characteristics common to all contributing languages. As a result, it can be transformed into any of the contributing variants using only these language-specific characteristics. If the word has any derivatives that occur in the source languages with appropriate parallel meanings, then their morphological connection must remain intact; for example, the Interlingua word for 'time' is spelled tempore and not *tempus or *tempo in order to match it with its derived adjectives, such as temporal.

The language-specific characteristics are closely related to the sound laws of the individual languages; the resulting words are often close or even identical to the most recent form common to the contributing words. This sometimes corresponds with that of Vulgar Latin. At other times, it is much more recent or even contemporary. It is never older than the classical period.

=== An illustration ===
The French œil, Italian occhio, Spanish ojo, and Portuguese olho appear quite different, but they descend from a historical form oculus. German Auge, Dutch oog and English eye (cf. Czech and Polish oko, Russian and Ukrainian око (óko)) are related to this form in that all three descend from Proto-Indo-European *okʷ. In addition, international derivatives like ocular and oculista occur in all of Interlingua's control languages. Each of these forms contributes to the eligibility of the Interlingua word. German and English base words do not influence the form of the Interlingua word, because their Indo-European connection is considered too remote. Instead, the remaining base words and especially the derivatives determine the form oculo found in Interlingua.

=== Free word-building ===
Words can also be included in Interlingua by deriving them using Interlingua words and affixes; a method called free word-building. Thus, in the Interlingua–English Dictionary (IED), Alexander Gode followed the principle that every word listed is accompanied by all of its clear compounds and derivatives, along with the word or words it is derived from. A reader skimming through the IED notices many entries followed by large groups of derived and compound words. A good example is the Interlingua word nation, which is followed by national, nationalismo, nationalista, nationalitate, nationalisar, international, internationalitate, and many other words.

Other words in the IED do not have derivatives listed. Gode saw these words as potential word families. Although all derived words in the IED are found in at least one control language, speakers may make free use of Interlingua roots and affixes. For example, jada ('jade') can be used to form jadificar, ('to jadify, make into jade, make look like jade'), jadification, and so on. These word forms would be impermissible in English but would be good Interlingua.

==== Word-building by analogy ====
Gode and Hugh E. Blair explained in the Interlingua Grammar that the basic principle of practical word-building is analogical. If a pattern can be found in the existing international vocabulary, new words can be formed according to that pattern. A meaning of the suffix -ista is 'person who practices the art or science of....' This suffix allows the derivation of biologista from biologia, physicista from physica, and so on. An Interlingua speaker can freely form saxophonista from saxophone and radiographista from radiographia by following the same pattern.

==== Usefulness and clarity ====
As noted above, the only limits to free word-building in Interlingua are clarity and usefulness. These concepts are touched upon here:

Any number of words could be formed by stringing roots and affixes together, but some would be more useful than others. For example, the English word rainer means 'a person who rains', but most people would be surprised that it is included in English dictionaries. The corresponding Interlingua word pluviator is unlikely to appear in a dictionary because of its lack of utility. Interlingua, like any traditional language, could build up large numbers of these words, but this would be undesirable.

Gode stressed the principle of clarity in free word-building. As Gode noted, the noun marinero ('mariner') can be formed from the adjective marin, because its meaning is clear. The noun marina meaning 'navy' cannot be formed, because its meaning would not be clear from the adjective and suffix that gave rise to it.

== Grammar ==
Interlingua has been developed to omit any grammatical feature that is absent from any one primary control language. Thus, Interlingua has no noun–adjective agreement by gender, case, or number (cf. Spanish and Portuguese gatas negras or Italian gatte nere, 'black female cats'), because this is absent from English, and it has no progressive verb tenses (English I am reading), because they are absent from French. Conversely, Interlingua distinguishes singular nouns from plural nouns because all the control languages do. With respect to the secondary control languages, Interlingua has articles, unlike Russian.

The definite article le is invariable, as in English ("the"). Nouns have no grammatical gender. Plurals are formed by adding -s, or -es after a final consonant. Personal pronouns take one form for the subject and one for the direct object and reflexive. In the third person, the reflexive is always se. Most adverbs are derived regularly from adjectives by adding -mente, or -amente after a -c. An adverb can be formed from any adjective in this way.

Verbs take the same form for all persons (io vive, tu vive, illa vive, 'I live', 'you live', 'she lives'). The indicative (pare, 'appear', 'appears') is the same as the imperative (pare! 'appear!'), and there is no subjunctive. Three common verbs usually take short forms in the present tense: es for 'is', 'am', 'are;' ha for 'has', 'have;' and va for 'go', 'goes'. A few irregular verb forms are available, but rarely used.

There are four simple tenses (present, past, future, and conditional), three compound tenses (past, future, and conditional), and the passive voice. The compound structures employ an auxiliary plus the infinitive or the past participle (e.g., Ille ha arrivate, 'He has arrived'). Simple and compound tenses can be combined in various ways to express more complex tenses (e.g., Nos haberea morite, 'We would have died').

Word order is subject–verb–object, except that a direct object pronoun or reflexive pronoun comes before the verb (io les vide, 'I see them'). Adjectives may precede or follow the nouns they modify, but they most often follow it. The position of adverbs is flexible, though constrained by common sense.

The grammar of Interlingua has been described as similar to that of the Romance languages, but simplified, primarily under the influence of English. A 1991 paper argued that Interlingua's grammar was similar to the simple grammars of Japanese and particularly Chinese.

F. P. Gopsill has written that Interlingua has no irregularities, although Gode's Interlingua Grammar suggests that Interlingua has a small number of irregularities.

== Samples ==
From an essay by Alexander Gode:

Interlingua se ha distacate ab le movimento pro le disveloppamento e le introduction de un lingua universal pro tote le humanitate. Si on non crede que un lingua pro tote le humanitate es possibile, si on non crede que le interlingua va devenir un tal lingua, es totalmente indifferente ab le puncto de vista de interlingua mesme. Le sol facto que importa (ab le puncto de vista del interlingua ipse) es que le interlingua, gratias a su ambition de reflecter le homogeneitate cultural e ergo linguistic del occidente, es capace de render servicios tangibile a iste precise momento del historia del mundo. Il es per su contributiones actual e non per le promissas de su adherentes que le interlingua vole esser judicate.

Interlingua has detached itself from the movement for the development and introduction of a universal language for all humanity. Whether or not one believes that a language for all humanity is possible, whether or not one believes that Interlingua will become such a language is totally irrelevant from the point of view of Interlingua itself. The only fact that matters (from the point of view of Interlingua itself) is that Interlingua, thanks to its ambition of reflecting the cultural and thus linguistic homogeneity of the West, is capable of rendering tangible services at this precise moment in the history of the world. It is by its present contributions and not by the promises of its adherents that Interlingua wishes to be judged.

The Lord's Prayer (compared)
Latin	Latino sine flexione	Interlingua	Esperanto	English (traditional)
Pater noster, qui es in caelis, sanctificetur nomen tuum. Adveniat regnum tuum. Fiat voluntas tua, sicut in caelo, et in terra.	Patre nostro, qui es in celos, que tuo nomine fi sanctificato; que tuo regno adveni; que tuo voluntate es facto sicut in celo et in terra.	Patre nostre, qui es in le celos, que tu nomine sia sanctificate; que tu regno veni; que tu voluntate sia facite como in le celo, etiam super le terra.	Patro nia, Kiu estas en la ĉielo, sanktigata estu Via nomo. Venu Via regno, fariĝu Via volo, kiel en la ĉielo tiel ankaŭ sur la tero.	Our Father, who art in heaven, hallowed be thy name; thy kingdom come, thy will be done, on earth, as it is in heaven.
Panem nostrum quotidianum da nobis hodie, et dimitte nobis debita nostra, sicut et nos dimittimus debitoribus nostris. Et ne nos inducas in tentationem, sed libera nos a malo. Amen.	Da hodie ad nos nostro pane quotidiano, et remitte ad nos nostro debitos, sicut et nos remitte ad nostro debitores. Et non induce nos in tentatione, sed libera nos ab malo. Amen.	Da nos hodie nostre pan quotidian, e pardona a nos nostre debitas como etiam nos los pardona a nostre debitores. E non induce nos in tentation, sed libera nos del mal. Amen.	Nian panon ĉiutagan donu al ni hodiaŭ kaj pardonu al ni niajn ŝuldojn, kiel ankaŭ ni pardonas al niaj ŝuldantoj. Kaj ne konduku nin en tenton, sed liberigu nin de la malbono. Amen.	Give us this day our daily bread; and forgive us our trespasses as we have forgiven those who trespass against us. And lead us not into temptation, but deliver us from evil. Amen.

== Flags and symbols ==
As with Esperanto, there have been proposals for a flag of Interlingua; the proposal by Czech translator Karel Podrazil is recognized by multilingual sites. It consists of a white four-pointed star extending to the edges of the flag and dividing it into an upper blue and lower red half. The star is symbolic of the four cardinal directions, and the two halves symbolize Romance and non-Romance speakers of Interlingua who understand each other.

Another symbol of Interlingua is the Blue Marble surrounded by twelve stars on a black or blue background, echoing the twelve stars of the Flag of Europe (because the source languages of Interlingua are purely European).

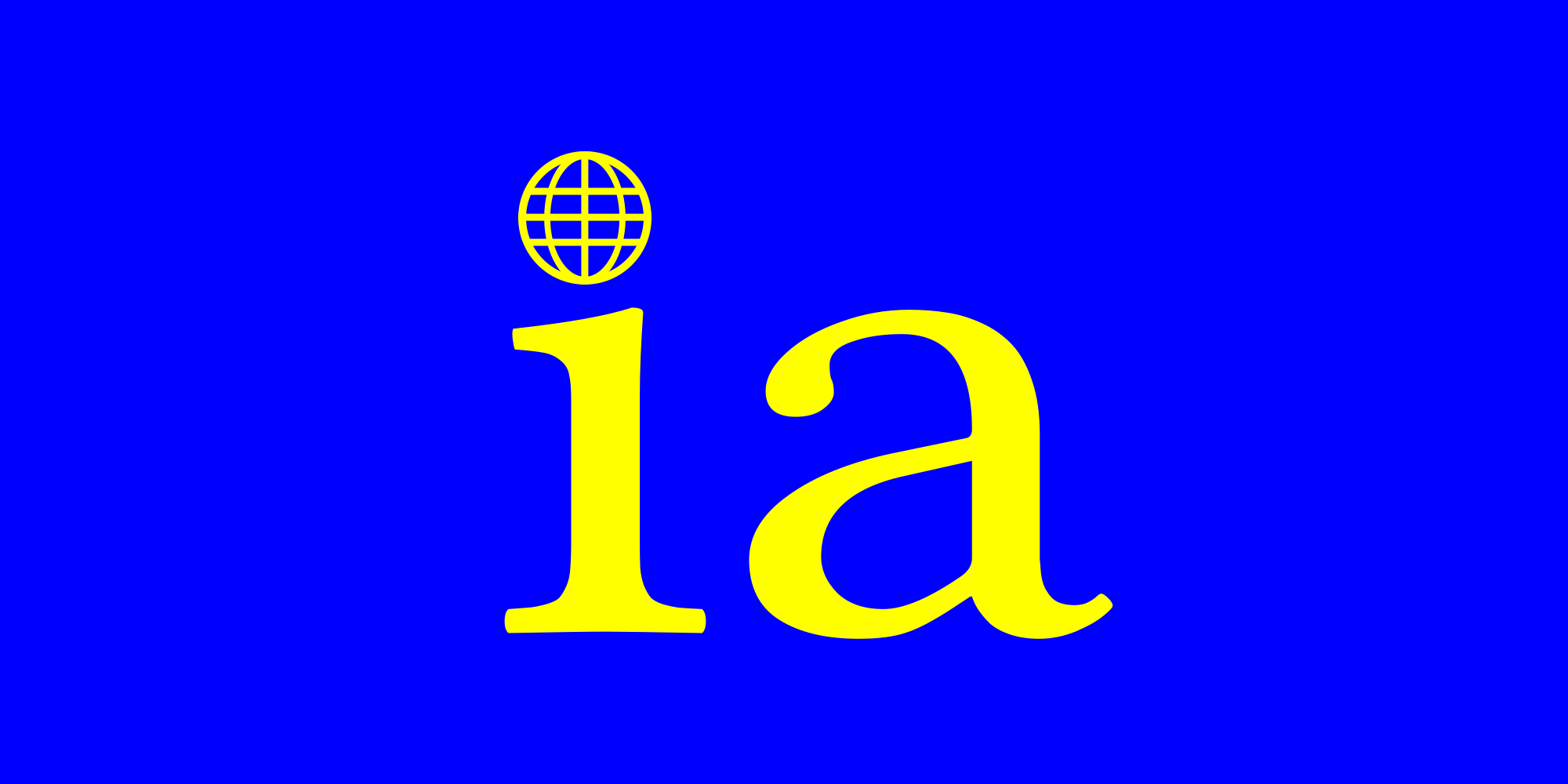
Unofficial flag often appearing in the Interlingua-speaking community

Unofficial flag of Interlingua proposed by Karel Podrazil

Flag of Interlingua officially adopted at 75th Anniversary celebration

=== Specification ===
A construction sheet for the flag of Interlingua.

The flag of Interlingua is a rectangle with a 2:3 ratio, the longer side being horizontal. The flag has two colours: azure (blue) and gold (yellow). These colours are defined by the following values:

	Azure	Gold
Pantone	Reflex Blue	Yellow
RGB	#003399	#FFCC00
CMYK	100.80.0.0	0.21.100.0

The flag consists of an azure background with a centred eight-sided polygon forming a four-pointed star in solid gold. If the flag is represented with a horizontal length of 18 and a vertical length of 12, the polygon is defined by the following coordinates: [ ⟨0,6⟩ ⟨8,7⟩ ⟨9,12⟩ ⟨10,7⟩ ⟨18,6⟩ ⟨10,5⟩ ⟨9,0⟩ ⟨8,5⟩ ⟨0,6⟩ ].

== See also ==
Theoretical framework

- Interlinguistics

Comparisons with other languages

- Comparison between Ido and Interlingua
- Comparison between Interlingue and Interlingua

Other languages

- Esperanto
- Interslavic
- Ido
- Interlingue
- Novial

Publications

- Grammatica de Interlingua
- Interlingua, Instrumento Moderne de Communication International (course manual)
- Interlingua dictionaries

Vocabulary

- Classical compound
- Hybrid word
- Internationalism (linguistics)
- List of Greek and Latin roots in English
- Irregularities and exceptions in Interlingua

== Bibliography ==
- Blandino, Giovanni (1989). "Le problema del linguas international auxiliari". Philosophia del Cognoscentia e del Scientia (in Interlingua). Rome, Italy: Pontificia Universitas Lateranensis, Pontificia università urbaniana.
- Brauers, Karl (1975). Grammatica synoptic de Interlingua. Morges, Switzerland: Editiones Interlingua.
- Bray, Mary Connell (1971) [1951]. ""Foreword" and "Acknowledgements"". In Alexander Gode (ed.). Interlingua-English; A dictionary of the international language (Second ed.). New York: Frederick Ungar Publishing. ISBN 0-8044-0188-8. OCLC 162319. Archived from the original on 17 October 2007.
- Breinstrup, Thomas (2006a). Interlingua course for beginners (PDF). Bilthoven, Netherlands: Union Mundial pro Interlingua.
- Breinstrup, Thomas (2006b). "Un revolution in le mundo scientific" [A revolution in the scientific world]. Historia de interlingua (in Interlingua). Archived from the original on 27 April 2019.
- Breinstrup, Thomas (2006c) [2001]. "Interlingua: Forte, Fructuose, Futur". Historia de interlingua (in Interlingua).
- Breinstrup, Thomas (2006d) [2001]. Breinstrup, Th.; Stenström, Ingvar; Olsson, Jesper (eds.). "Biographias: Hugh Edward Blair". Interlingua (in Interlingua). Archived from the original on 28 April 2019.
- Breinstrup, Th.; Stenström, Ingvar; Olsson, Jesper, eds. (2007) [2001]. "Biographias: Ingvar Stenström". Interlingua (in Interlingua). Archived from the original on 26 April 2019.
- Breinstrup, Th.; Stenström, Ingvar; Olsson, Jesper, eds. (2009) [2001]. "Portrait del organisationes de interlingua". Interlingua (in Interlingua). Archived from the original on 16 October 2006.
- Breinstrup, Th.; Stenström, Ingvar; Olsson, Jesper, eds. (2012) [2001]. "Biographias: Alexander Gottfried Friedrich Gode-von Aesch". Interlingua (in Interlingua). Archived from the original on 14 May 2011.
- Falk, Julia S. (1995). "Words without grammar: Linguists and the international language movement in the United States". Language and Communication. 15 (3). Pergamon: 241–259. doi:10.1016/0271-5309(95)00010-N.
- Falk, Julia S. (1999). Women, Language and Linguistics: Three American stories from the first half of the twentieth century. London & New York: Routledge.
- Fiedler, Sabine (2007). "Phraseology in planned languages". In Burger, Harald; Dobrovol'Skij, Dmitrij; Kühn, Peter; Norrick, Neal R. (eds.). Phraseology: Ein internationales Handbuch der zeitgenössischen Forschung. Vol. 2. De Gruyter Mouton. pp. 779–788. doi:10.1515/9783110190762.779. ISBN 978-3-11-019831-7.
- Gode, Alexander; Blair, Hugh E. (1955) [1951]. Interlingua; a grammar of the international language (Second ed.). New York: Frederick Ungar Publishing. ISBN 0-8044-0186-1. OCLC 147452.
- Gopsill, Frank Peter (1990). International languages: a matter for Interlingua. Sheffield, England: British Interlingua Society. ISBN 0-9511695-6-4. OCLC 27813762.
- Gopsill, Frank Peter (1994). Interlingua today: A course for beginners. Sheffield, England: British Interlingua Society. ISBN 9781898017011.
- Gopsill, Frank Peter. "Le historia antenatal de Interlingua | 1951-1991" (in Interlingua). Archived from the original on 27 October 2009.
- Gopsill, Frank Peter; Sexton, Brian (2006a) [2001]. "Le historia antenatal de Interlingua". Historia de interlingua (in Interlingua). Archived from the original on 14 May 2011.
- Gopsill, Frank Peter; Sexton, Brian (2006b) [2001]. "Profunde recerca duce a un lingua". Historia de interlingua (in Interlingua). Archived from the original on 10 December 2022.
- Gopsill, Frank Peter; Sexton, Brian (2006c) [2001]. "Le natura, si – un schema, no". Historia de interlingua (in Interlingua). Archived from the original on 12 April 2022.
- International Auxiliary Language Association (IALA) (1971) [1951]. Alexander Gode (ed.). Interlingua-English; A dictionary of the international language (Second ed.). New York: Frederick Ungar Publishing. ISBN 0-8044-0188-8. OCLC 162319. Archived from the original on 27 December 2007.
- Morris, Alice Vanderbilt (1945). International Auxiliary Language Association General Report 1945. New York: International Auxiliary Language Association (IALA). Archived from the original on 2 July 2004.
- Pei, Mario (1958). One Language for the World and How To Achieve It. New York: Devin-Adair.
- Sexton, Brian C.; Wilgenhoff, Karel; Gopsill, F. Peter (1991). Supplementary Interlingua-English Dictionary. Sheffield: British Interlingua Society. ISBN 0-95116-959-9.
- Stenström, Ingvar (1991a). "The Interlingua of IALA: From "the linguists' project" of 1951 to the working "tool of international scientific communication" of 1981". Interlinguistica e Interlingua: Discursos public per Ingvar Stenström e Leland B. Yeager. Beekbergen, Netherlands: Servicio de Libros UMI.
- Stenström, Ingvar (1991b). "Utilisation de Interlingua in le inseniamento de linguas" [Utilization of Interlingua in the teaching of languages]. Interlinguistica e Interlingua: Discursos public per Ingvar Stenström e Leland B. Yeager. Beekbergen, Netherlands: Servicio de Libros UMI.
- Stillman, E. Clark; Gode von Aesch, Alexander (1943). "Le tres principios principal del standardization international in interlingua". Interlinguistic standardization (in Interlingua). Translated by Mulaik, Stanley A. New York: International Auxiliary Language Association. pp. Articles 82–100. Archived from the original on 15 May 2008.
- Union Mundial pro Interlingua (UMI). "Interlingua 2001: communication sin frontieras durante 50 annos" (in Interlingua). Archived from the original on 22 April 2015.
- Wilgenhof, Karel (1995). Grammatica de Interlingua. Beekbergen, Netherlands: Union Mundial pro Interlingua.
- Yeager, Leland B. (1991a). "Le linguistica como reclamo pro Interlingua" [Linguistics as an advertisement for Interlingua]. Interlinguistica e Interlingua: Discursos public (in Interlingua). Beekbergen, Netherlands: Servicio de Libros UMI.
- Yeager, Leland B. (1991b). "Artificialitate, ethnocentrismo, e le linguas oriental: Le caso de Interlingua" [Artificiality, ethnocentrism, and the Oriental languages: The case of Interlingua]. Interlinguistica e Interlingua: Discursos public per Ingvar Stenström e Leland B. Yeager. Beekbergen, Netherlands: Servicio de Libros UMI.
