= Alexander Gode =

American linguist

- Born: October 30, 1906; Bremen, Imperial Germany
- Died: August 10, 1970 (aged 63); Mount Kisco, New York, United States
- Citizenship: American
- Education: Columbia University
- Scientific career
- Fields: Language
- Workplaces: University of Chicago; Columbia University

Alexander Gottfried Friedrich Gode-von Aesch (October 30, 1906 – August 10, 1970) was a German-born American linguist, translator and the driving force behind the creation of the auxiliary language Interlingua.

== Biography ==
Born to a German father and a Swiss mother, Gode studied at the University of Vienna and the University of Paris before leaving for the U.S. and becoming a citizen in 1927. He was an instructor at the University of Chicago as well as Columbia University, where he received his Ph.D. in Germanic Studies in 1939.

Alexander Gode died of cancer in hospital. He was preceded in death by his first wife, Johanna. Gode was survived by two daughters from his first marriage, his second wife Alison, and their two children.

== Interlingua ==
Gode was involved with the International Auxiliary Language Association (IALA) from 1933 on, sporadically at first. In 1936 the IALA began development of a new international auxiliary language and in 1939 Gode was hired to assist in this work.

After André Martinet was brought in to head the research in 1946, the two men's views came into conflict as Gode thought that Martinet was trying to schematize the new language too much, conflating it with Occidental. Gode saw no need to invent a language, as a product of some a-priori design. Instead, he and the former director of research, Ezra Clark Stillman, wanted to record the international vocabulary that, in their view, already existed. This would be done — and was being done before Martinet — by systematically extracting and modifying words from the existing control languages in such a way that they could be seen as dialects of a common language, with their own specific peculiarities. When Martinet resigned in 1948 over a salary dispute, Gode took up leadership and got full reign in implementing this vision. The result was Interlingua, the dictionary and grammar of which were published in 1951.

In 1953, the role of IALA was assumed by the Interlingua Division of Science Service, and Gode became the division director. He continued his involvement with Interlingua until his death by translating scientific and medical texts into it. He won awards for this from the American Medical Writers Association and the International Federation of Translators.

== American Translators Association ==
Gode was one of the founders and first president of the American Translators Association (1960–1963). In his honor, this organization awards the Alexander Gode Medal "for outstanding service to the translation and interpreting professions".

== Selected publications ==
=== Scholarly works ===
- Gode, Alexander (1941). Natural Science in German Romanticism. Columbia University Press.
- Gode, Alexander (1943). Portuguese at Sight. Thomas Y. Crowell Co.
- Gode, Alexander (1951). Interlingua English Dictionary. Storm Publishers.
- Gode, Alexander (1951). A Brief Grammar of Interlingua for Readers. Storm Publishers.
- Gode, Alexander (1954). Interlingua a Prime Vista. Storm Publishers.
- Gode, Alexander; Blair (1955). Interlingua: A Grammar of the International Language. Storm Publishers.
- Gode, Alexander (1962). French at Sight. Ungar Pub Co. ISBN 978-0-8044-6181-8.
- Gode, Alexander (1972). Anthology of German Poetry Through the 19th Century. Ungar Pub Co. ISBN 978-0-8044-6241-9.
- Gode, Alexander (1975). Un Dozena de Breve Contos. Beekbergen.
- Gode, Alexander (1980). Discussiones de Interlingua. Beekbergen.
- Gode, Alexander (1983). Dece Contos. Beekbergen.
- Gode, Alexander; Kraus, Wright (2000). Last Days of Mankind. Ungar Pub. Co. ISBN 978-0-8044-6366-9.

=== Translations ===
- Frankl, Oscar Benjamin (1949). Theodor Herzl, the Jew and the Man: A Portrait. Gode. Storm.
- Giedion-Welcker, Carola; Herder (1952). Paul Klee. Gode. Viking Press.
- Nettl, Paul (1952). National Anthems. Gode. Storm.
- Szczesny, Gerhard (1969). The Case Against Bertold Brecht. Gode. Ungar Pub. Co. ISBN 0-8044-2847-6.
- Petersen, Caron (1969). Albert Camus. Gode. F. Ungar.
- Daim, Wilfried (1970). The Vatican and Eastern Europe. Gode. Frederick Ungar. ISBN 978-0-8044-5272-4.

== See also ==
- Language education
