= International Auxiliary Language Association =

1924–1956 American organisation for promoting an international auxiliary language

The International Auxiliary Language Association, Inc. (IALA) was an American organisation founded in 1924 to "promote widespread study, discussion and publicity of all questions involved in the establishment of an auxiliary language, together with research and experiment that may hasten such establishment in an intelligent manner and on stable foundations." Although it was created to determine which auxiliary language of a wide field of contenders was best suited for international communication, it eventually determined that none of them was up to the task and developed its own language, Interlingua.

The IALA continued to publish materials in and about Interlingua until 1953, when its activities were taken up by the new Interlingua Division of Science Service. The IALA was dissolved sometime after 1956.

== Authorities ==
Presidents:

- Dean Earle B. Babcock 1924-1936,
- Dr John H. Finley 1936-1940,
- Dr Stephen Duggan 1940-1950.

Honorary Secretary and Chairman of the Research Division:

- Alice V. Morris 1924 - 1950.

Treasurers:

- Mr Morris 1924-1944,
- Lawrence Morris 1944-1951,

Directors of the Research Staff:

- Prof. William E. Collinson 1936-1939,
- E. Clark Stillmann 1939-1942,
  - Acting: Dr Alexander Gode 1942-1946,
- Dr Andre Martinet 1946-1948,
- Dr Alexander Gode 1948-1951.

Executive director:

- Marry Connell Bray.

== See also ==
- History of Interlingua
