= Edgar de Wahl =

Estonian educator, inventor of Interlingue

Edgar von Wahl
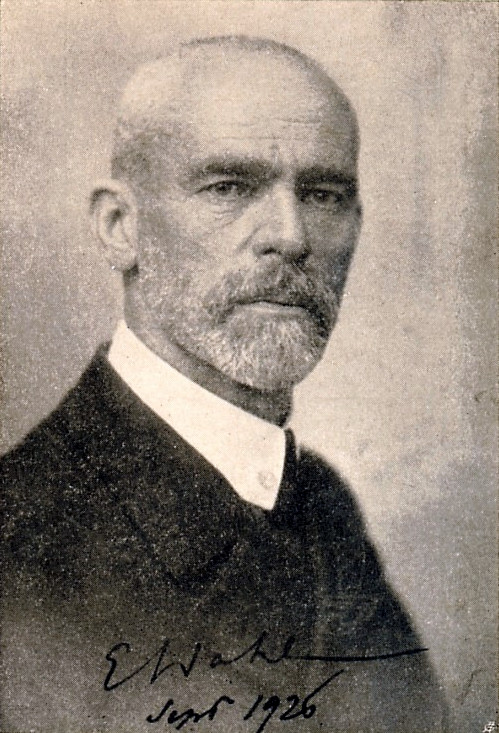
- Edgar von Wahl in 1926
- Born: 23 August 1867; Olwiopol, Kherson Governorate, Russian Empire
- Died: 9 March 1948 (aged 80); Tallinn, then part of Estonian SSR, Soviet Union
- Citizenship: Russian Empire (1867–1917); Estonia (1920–1948)
- Known for: Inventor of Interlingue (then known as Occidental)

Edgar von Wahl (Interlingue: Edgar de Wahl; born Edgar Alexis Robert von Wahl; 23 August 1867 – 9 March 1948) was a Baltic German mathematics and physics teacher who lived in Tallinn, Estonia. He also used the pseudonym Julian Prorók, and is best known as the creator of Interlingue, an international auxiliary language that was known as Occidental throughout his life.

He was born to the Baltic German noble von Wahl (Note: In German personal names, von is a preposition which approximately means 'of' or 'from' and usually denotes some sort of nobility. While von (always lower case) is part of the family name or territorial designation, not a first or middle name, if the noble is referred to by their last name, use Schiller, Clausewitz or Goethe, not von Schiller, etc.) family in the then Russian Empire and spent most of his childhood in Tallinn (Reval) and the capital Saint Petersburg. He studied at the University of Saint Petersburg and at the Saint Petersburg Academy of Arts. During and after his studies he served in the navy. After completing the military service in 1894 he lived permanently in Tallinn and worked as a teacher. During World War II, when most Baltic Germans left Estonia in 1939–1941, he decided to stay. He was arrested in 1943 by the Nazi German occupation authorities and placed in a psychiatric clinic because of alleged dementia. He stayed there until his death in 1948.

Wahl was engaged with interlinguistics from an early age. He was first introduced to Volapük by his father's colleague Waldemar Rosenberger and even started to compose a lexicon of marine terminology for the language, before turning to Esperanto in 1888. After the failure of Reformed Esperanto in 1894, of which Wahl had been a proponent, he started work to find an ideal form of an international language. In 1922, he published a "key" to a new language, Occidental, and the first edition of the periodical Kosmoglott (later Cosmoglotta). Wahl developed the language over several decades on the advice of its speakers, but became isolated from the movement (then centred in Switzerland) from 1939 after the start of World War II.

== Biography ==
=== Ancestry ===
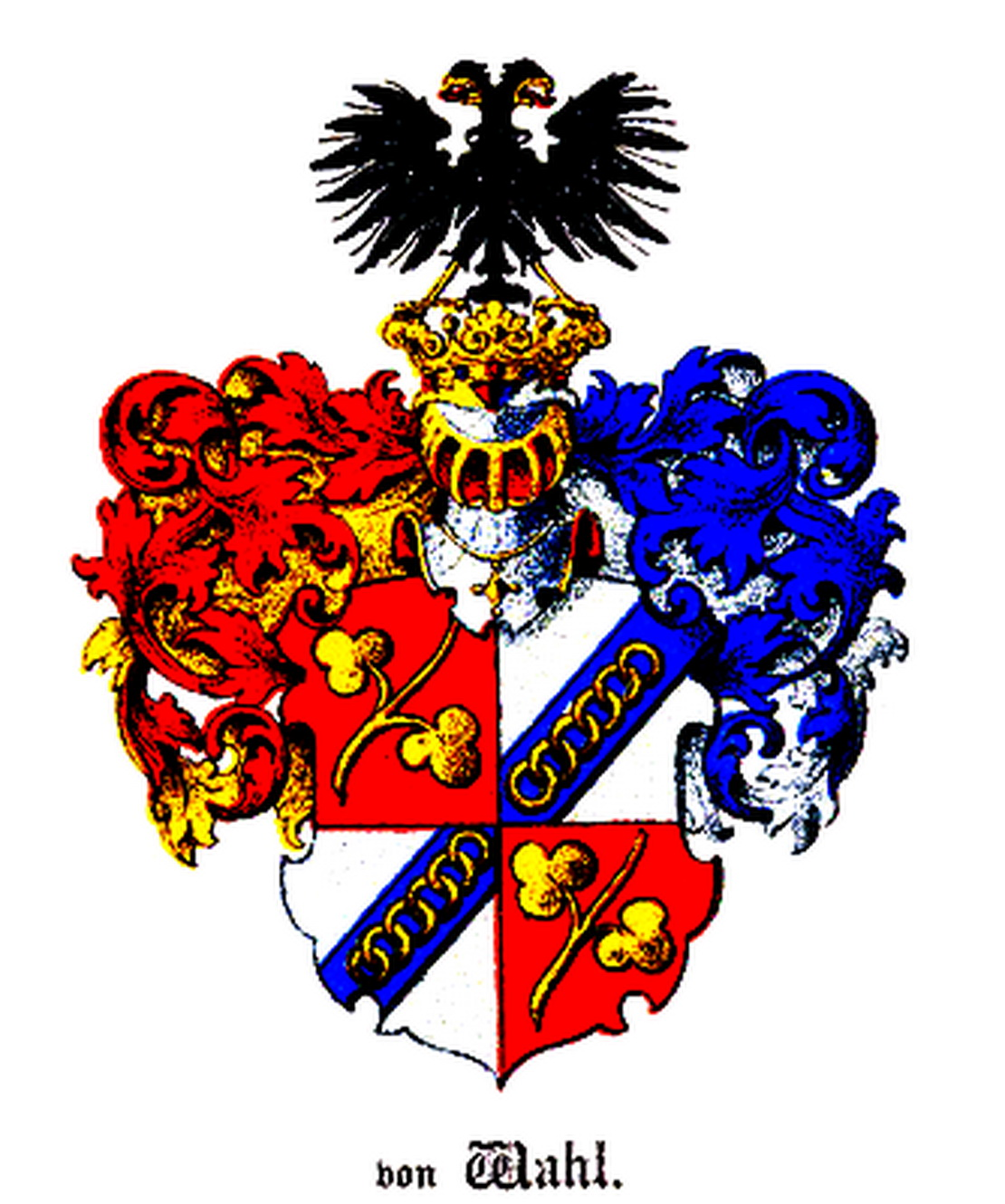
Coat of arms of the Wahl family

Edgar von Wahl was a member of the Päinurme line of the Wahl noble family. Edgar von Wahl's great-grandfather was Carl Gustav von Wahl, who acquired the Pajusi, Tapiku and Kavastu manors and was also the owner of Kaave Manor for a short time. Carl Gustav von Wahl had a total of 14 children from two marriages, from whom various Wahl lines descended. Of them, Edgar von Wahl's grandfather Alexei von Wahl, a civil servant who bought Päinurme manor in 1837, laid the foundation for the Päinurme line. In addition, he was a tenant at Taevere Manor, where Edgar's father Oskar von Wahl was born.

=== Childhood and youth ===
Edgar Alexis Robert von Wahl was born on 23 August 1867 to Oskar von Wahl and Lydia Amalie Marie (married 1866 in Tallinn), in what is now Pervomaisk, Mykolaiv Oblast, in Ukraine (then in the Kherson Governorate, Russian Empire). (Note: It is disputed whether Wahl was born in the town of Oliviopol (Ukrainian: Ольвіополь), or the nearby village Bohopil (Ukrainian: Богопіль), across the Southern Bug river. Wahl's birth certificate states that he was born in Bohopil, but the accuracy of it can be doubted.) The Wahl family had moved to Ukraine after his father, a railway engineer, started work on the Odesa–Balta–Kremenchuk–Kharkov railway in 1866. By 1869, the Wahl family had moved to Kremenchuk, where Wahl's brother Arthur Johann Oskar was born in 1870. After that, the family moved to Tallinn, where Wahl's two sisters were born – Lydia Jenny Cornelia in 1871 and Harriet Marie Jenny in 1873. The family later moved to Saint Petersburg where the third sister Jenny Theophile was born in 1877.

Wahl grew up in Saint Petersburg. He began studying at the 3rd Gymnasium in Saint Petersburg, graduating in 1886. He then studied at the Faculty of Physics and Mathematics at the University of Saint Petersburg and architecture and painting at the Saint Petersburg Academy of Arts. While at university, Wahl joined the Baltic German Nevania corporation operating in St. Petersburg, where he served as treasurer in the autumn term of 1891. He graduated in 1891 and in 1893 received a diploma as a teacher of drawing at the Elementary School of the Academy of Arts. He worked briefly as a substitute teacher in Saint Petersburg in the autumn of 1891, before entering the navy.

During his boyhood, Wahl learnt several languages; he became fluent in German, Russian, Estonian and French. In upper secondary school he studied Latin and ancient Greek, and Spanish at university. In addition to these, throughout his life he was able to make himself understood in nine other languages. He had an interest in creating languages from a young age:

Even in my youth, I had the idea of constructing a language. Full of stories from Cooper, Gustave Aimard etc, I played American Indians with my friends, and conceived the idea of a special quasi-Indian jargon for our games. It was made of Indian words taken from stories, and completed with other necessary words taken from diverse other languages. It had a grammar composed of mixed Ancient Greek and Estonian. This language was never used because my friends refused to learn it.

=== Military service ===
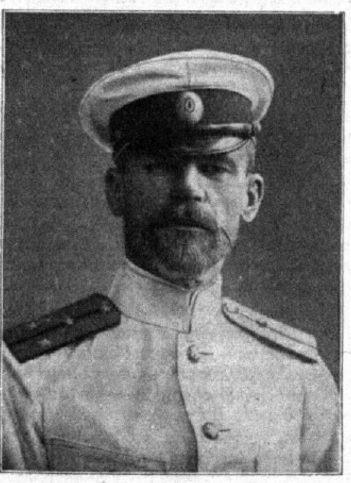
Wahl in a Russian Navy uniform in 1914

In 1892, Wahl volunteered to serve in the Russian Navy. During his service, he travelled extensively, visiting the Caribbean islands and the United States among other places. In early 1894, he received the rank of Michman (Russian: мичман) and retired shortly thereafter. In the summer of 1904, Wahl was again called to active service. He served in the Baltic Fleet until October 1905, although he did not participate in the battles of the Russo-Japanese War.

According to the memoirs of Estonian artist Olev Mikiver, who knew Wahl as a youth, Wahl had been very proud of his Tsarist-era officer's uniform and he sometimes wore it even decades later:

E. von Wahl, incidentally, had been an officer in the tsar's navy at a young age and, according to his words, put down a sailor's rebellion at Sveaborg, Helsinki's military port or sea fortress, now called Suomenlinna, in 1905 or 1906. He must have considered this time sacred, because decades later, for example, at my sister's wedding, he appeared in a tsarist uniform.

— Olev Mikiver's memoirs, published 1993

It is, however, unlikely that Wahl participated in the suppression of the Sveaborg rebellion, having already been released from service by then. He may have been called to active service during World War I.

During his service in the navy, Wahl was awarded the 2nd and 3rd rank of the Order of Saint Stanislav and the 3rd rank of the Order of Saint Anne. After acquiring Estonian citizenship at the end of 1920 Wahl was from 1921 also registered as a reserve officer of the Republic of Estonia.

=== Tallinn 1894–1917 ===
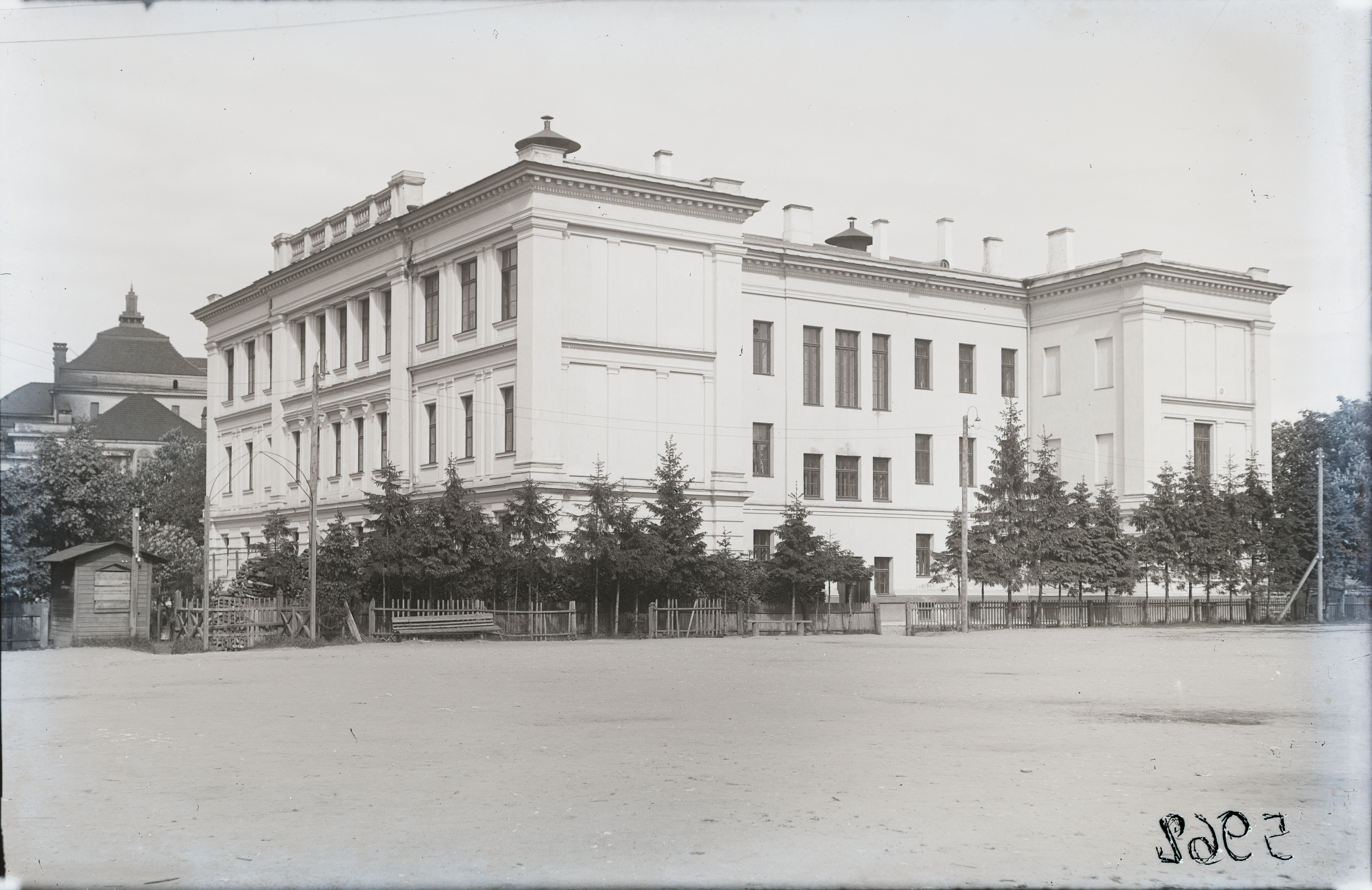
The house of the former St. Peter's High School of Science where Wahl worked as teacher for many years

In 1894, Wahl moved to Tallinn, where he spent most of the rest of his life. That autumn, he started working as a teacher of mathematics and physics at St. Peter's High School of Science (now the Tallinn Secondary School of Science). Later he taught drawing at the girls' school run by Baronness Elisabeth von der Howen, the Hanseatic School, Tallinn, and the Tallinn Cathedral School. His teaching was interrupted only by his military service.

Wahl's teaching style was described in the memoirs of the later Estonian Minister of Education Aleksander Veiderma, who himself studied at St Peter's High School of Science from 1906 to 1909:

Matemaatikat ja füüsikat õpetas veel Edgar von Wahl, endine mereväeohvitser, kellel oli alati varuks tabav märkus mõne sündmuse või isiku kohta. Ta oli kaunis räpakas füüsikakatsete korraldamisel: sageli murdusid riistad või purunesid klaasid. Tema suhtumine õpilastesse oli lihtne, mida kinnitab ka hüüdnimi Sass.

Mathematics and physics were also taught by Edgar von Wahl, a former naval officer who always had some catchy remarks about an event or person. He was very messy in conducting physics experiments: utensils or glass often broke. His attitude towards students was simple, which is also confirmed by the nickname Sass.

— Memoirs of Aleksander Veiderma

At the turn of the century, Wahl began to publish articles on linguistics in specialized publications, as well as writing in various Tallinn newspapers and magazines. Since 1898, Wahl had been a member of the Estonian Literature Society (German: Ehstländische Literärische Gesellschaft), a German-language association that regularly organised presentations by and for its members. Under the pseudonym Julian Prorók, he published a booklet Ketzereien: Keimzellen einer Philosophie (Heresies: Gametes of a Philosophy) in 1906 about his vision of global developments.

Wahl also entered politics before the outbreak of World War I. In 1913, he was elected to the Tallinn city council, and became a member of the council committee for the protection of monuments of ancient buildings. Despite his teaching position, Wahl did not address education issues on the city council. He was an active attendee at council meetings, but spoke little.

After the start of World War I, the Germans living in the Russian Empire were subjected to repression, from which Wahl did not completely escape; the Tallinn Noble Club, of which Wahl had been a member, was closed. In autumn 1914, he found himself at the centre of a propaganda campaign to change German place names. As a city councillor, he participated in discussions on the renaming of the city of Tallinn, (Note: Tallinn is the name of the city in the Estonian language; throughout most of the city's history, it was known by the Germanic name Reval.) following Mayor Jaan Poska's proposal replace its name with the Old Russian-language Kolyvan (in the discussion of the matter, the incorrect name Kalyvan was used). Wahl discovered that the oldest names of the city were Ledenets or Lindanisa. He was interested in how much it would cost to change the name, which was said to have been met with "general laughter" at the council. The votes required to change the name were eventually reached by the council, but the change itself did not take place.

Wahl was elected to the city council held just before the February Revolution in 1917. On the new council, he became a member of the city's fire department, public education, and pawnshop affairs committees, and continued as a member of the committee for the protection of monuments of ancient buildings. However, in August 1917, a new council was elected, and Wahl's political activities ceased.

=== Life in independent Estonia ===
In February 1918, at the time of the Estonian Declaration of Independence, Wahl expressed a desire to join the voluntary militia Omakaitse. As a student who wrote weapon permits for volunteers: "Among those who wanted to bear weapons, I only remember one: my physics teacher, von Wahl. I think I remember it because of the mood that might have arisen in the soul of a young student when his teacher asks him for a weapon."

In 1919, the Secondary School of Science was divided by language: the Tallinn High School of Science taught in Estonian and the Tallinn German High School of Science taught in German. Wahl continued as a professor at the latter, where he taught classes in mathematics, physics, geography, cosmography, and drawing. He had a house on Eha Street, not far from the school, where students often went for follow-up work. He had designed this house in a marine style and it was therefore nicknamed the "cabin" by his students. Among his students, Wahl was a popular teacher who was particularly dedicated to teaching geography since he had travelled extensively. The students were impressed by the fact that Wahl was a member of the English Club, which operated at the school.

Wahl sometimes clashed with his colleagues, openly expressing his distaste for modern art, for instance comparing it to communism when invited to an art exhibition by the school's art teacher. He retired in the mid-1920s, but continued to teach part-time until 1933. He then took up his hobbies, especially constructed languages, which had become a passion since the days of Saint Petersburg. Additionally, he was editor of the magazine Estländische Wochenschau from 1929 to 1930.

=== During World War II ===
Unlike his relatives, Wahl did not leave to be resettled in Germany in 1939, deciding to stay in Estonia. He represented the idealistic pan-European idea and did not like the National Socialist government of Germany, calling it a "termite state". Wahl may also have chosen to stay to avoid abandoning his large archive. The danger of ending up in a retirement home in Germany might also have played a role: this had happened to several of his acquaintances. Wahl again avoided the second resettlement to Germany that took place in the winter and early spring of 1941. He was certainly aware of the opportunity to leave, for when asked about his plans by one of his former students, he replied, leaving no doubt that his decision was stay in Estonia:

This Hitler, this madman, forbids my language in all the countries he conquers. This guy is crazy!

— Edgar von Wahl in the winter of 1941

In the first year of Soviet rule in Estonia (1940–1941) Wahl managed to escape any repressions, although some of his relatives were arrested. After the beginning of the German occupation of Estonia, he was suspected of anti-state activities. Wahl was arrested on 12 August 1943, because of letters sent to Posen, to his wife's sister-in-law, that were caught by the censors in Königsberg in July of that year. In these letters, he had predicted the outbreak of an uprising in Poland and advised the family who lived there to go to Germany:

after the dissolution of Bolshevism, around 1944, when the German-Allied forces approach from the north to dangerous Asia Minor to suppress the Arab uprising, but not before, it is highly likely that by withdrawing troops from the lands conquered by Germany, the Poles will try to start an uprising (they already have secret weapons camps), and then the long-running hate may turn into a especially ruthless massacre in old Polish villages and mansions which threatens the Balts. Therefore I want to warn you and everyone else in the same situation and ask you to leave Wartegau if possible, or at least any means of escape when the Arab uprising breaks out. Deploy the Reich in time. I ask that this letter, which I have written to you now, in July 1943, be preserved as a document and, if possible, given to others to look at.

— Letter from Edgar von Wahl to Lieselotte Riesenkampff in Tallinn on July 18, 1943

In the same letter, Wahl noted that he had previously predicted the attack on Pearl Harbor and the subsequent outbreak of war between the United States and Japan. During the interrogation Wahl did not deny what he had written, and repeated several of the accusations he had made, "firmly believing" in the veracity of his predictions. He was held for some time in the Tallinn "labour and education camp", but the testimony given during his interrogation was considered strange by the Sicherheitsdienst, and so Wahl was sent to be examined at the Seewald mental hospital. There he was diagnosed with dementia caused by ageing and left in the Seewald hospital, which also saved him from a possible death penalty. Wahl was defended by several close relatives and friends who claimed that he was not responsible for his actions.

During the bombing raid in March 1944, Wahl's house, including his archive collection, was destroyed, which came as a great shock to him. Three years later, in a letter to the Finnish Occidentalist Armas Ramstedt, he recalled that what had happened was a real disaster, during which many irreplaceable and unique materials were lost.

=== Last years and death ===
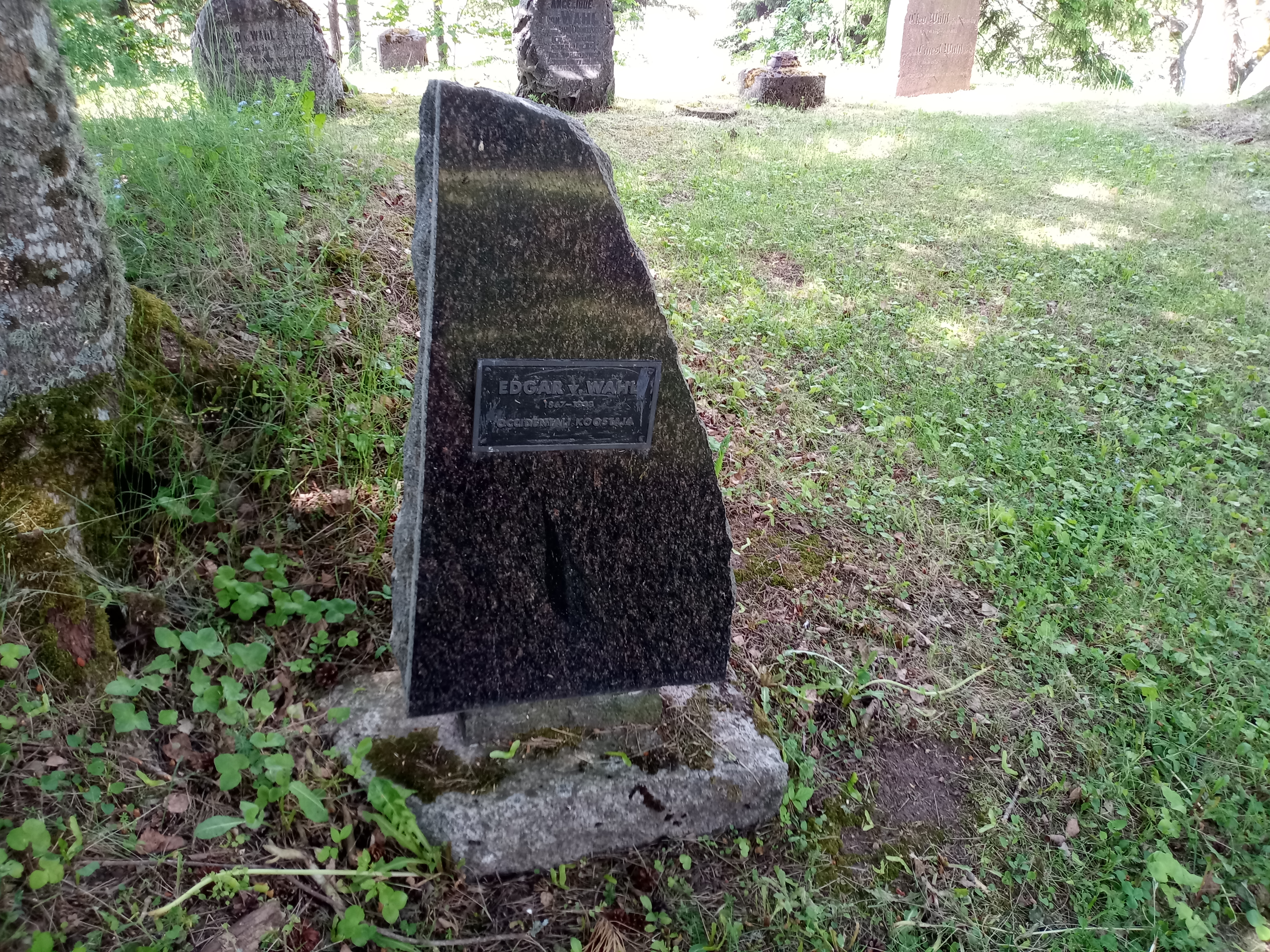
Edgar von Wahl's tombstone in Pajusi

In August 1945, Deportation of Germans from Estonia after World War II of the Germans still living in Estonia by the Soviet NKVD took place. The list of people to be deported included Wahl's name. At the time of the deportation, however, he was among a dozen people who were not deported or whose whereabouts could not be determined. Although the reasons for Wahl's escape are not known, in some cases the head of the task force that carried out the deportation made the decision not to take the seriously ill or disabled, so the decision may have been influenced by the opinion of the hospital staff. Therefore, it was his presence in a mental hospital that saved Wahl for a second time.

During and after the world war, his foreign colleagues had very little information about Wahl's condition and whereabouts; only in the spring of 1946 was Armas Ramstedt able to restore contact with him. It is unclear why the hospital staff at Seewald enabled such correspondence; perhaps that they may have recognized his dedication to linguistics when being supportive to his communication with the outside world.

Wahl died on 9 March 1948. He was buried on 14 March 1948 at the Siselinna Cemetery in Tallinn. In 1996, his remains were moved to the Pajusi manor cemetery, the family cemetery of the von Wahl family.

== Occidental ==
=== Background ===
Wahl's efforts to create a new and ideal language for international communication began with a general interest in artificial languages in the Russian Empire in the late 19th and early 20th centuries. He first became interested in the recently created Volapük in 1887 being introduced to the language by his father's colleague, Waldemar Rosenberger, in Saint Petersburg. He became an active advocate of Volapük, receiving the title "Teacher of Volapük" and started to compile a maritime lexicon in Volapük (although this project was never completed). In early 1888, he was introduced to Esperanto and switched to it.

Estonian linguist Paul Ariste has written that Wahl quickly became an advocate of Esperanto's creator, ophthalmologist L. L. Zamenhof, and his work after becoming acquainted with Unua Libro, the first Esperanto textbook (published in 1887). He soon influenced the early grammar of Esperanto and its vocabulary. Wahl was also one of the founders of Espero, Russia's first Esperanto society founded in Saint Petersburg in 1891, and became a correspondent for the magazine La Esperantisto. He translated Russian fiction into Esperanto and compiled an Esperanto-Spanish dictionary.

However, Wahl did not align himself definitively to Esperanto, beginning the search for a new artificial language:

He had a restless character, always something new. Because of this trait, when he was younger, he had been increasingly inclined to advocate new designs for artificial languages [...]

— Paul Ariste in 1967

According to Estonian Esperantist Jaan Ojalo, Wahl moved away from Esperanto after proposals to reform the language (of which Wahl was heavily in favour, having proposed some himself) were rejected by most Esperantists in 1894. In Ojalo's view, he also considered Esperanto to be an "a priori" language (original, unlike more naturalistic languages, such as Euroclones). He concluded that the ideal international language should be more naturalistic and understandable even to those who had not learnt it. Wahl also considered Esperanto too democratic, which threatened Western culture.

=== Creation and introduction ===
The Occidental symbol

Wahl took the first steps to create a new language in the last years of the 19th century. In 1896 and 1897 he published two articles in the Hanover-based magazine Linguist, in which he presented his ideas. Around the same time, Waldemar Rosenberger, who was at the time president of the Volapük Academy, introduced academy members to a new language of his own creation, Idiom Neutral. From 1906 onwards, Rosenberger also published the magazine Progress, wherein Wahl made his own proposals for reforms to the language, which Rosenberger adopted a year later in 1907. Despite the reform, the Idiom Neutral did not gain popularity. Concurrently, he developed a new international auxiliary language, based on the Romance languages, called Auli, an acronym for Auxiliari Lingue International in that language (English: International auxiliary language), which would later become the intermediate stage of Occidental. Wahl introduced Auli in 1909 in the journal Academia pro Interlingua – Discussiones. In 1911, he formulated the word formation rule (known as De Wahl's rule) that would form the basis of Occidental.

Occidental's symbol, depicting an encircled tilde, was introduced before 1934 and was selected from several variants for its simplicity and symbolism.

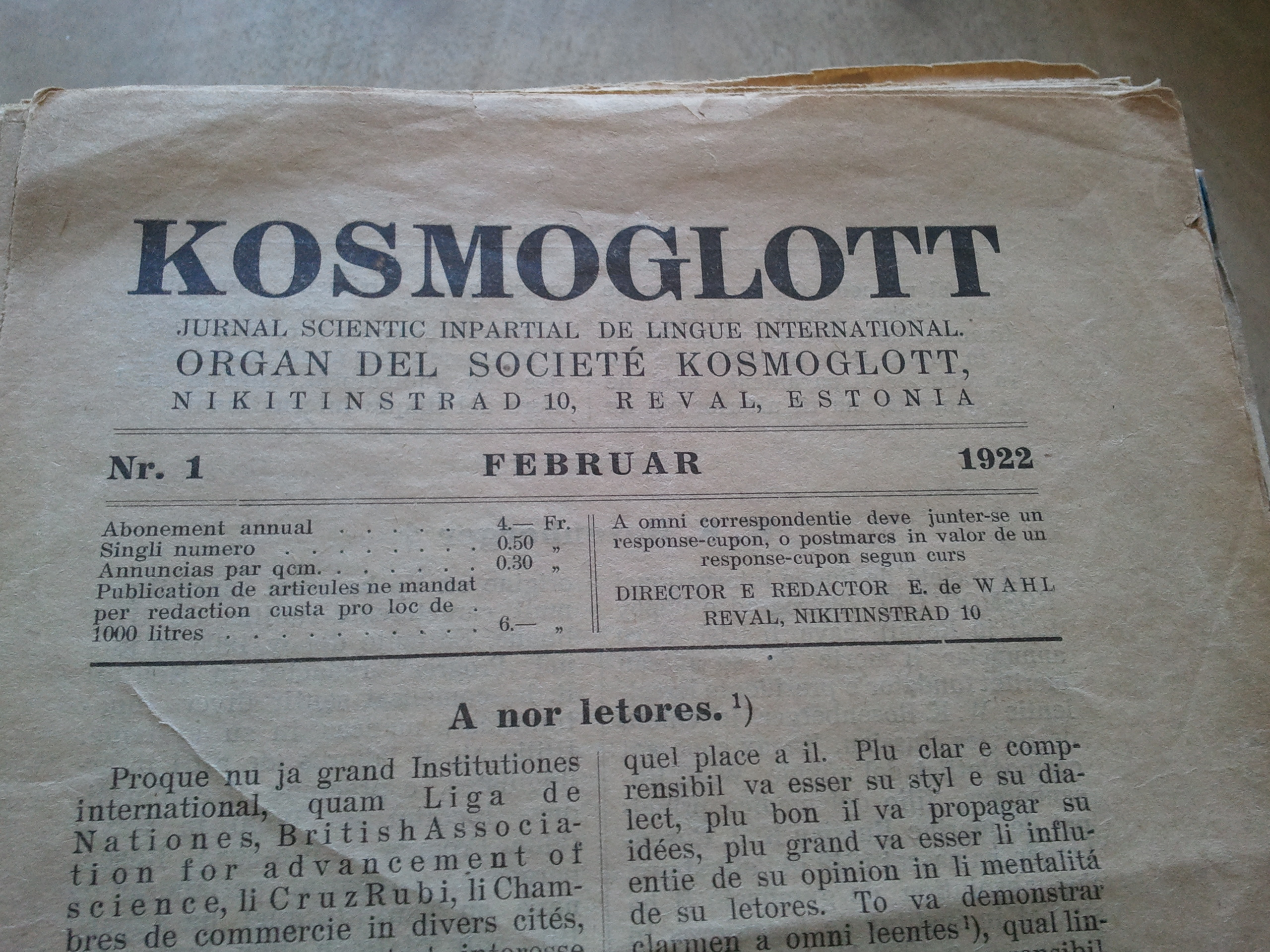
First issue of magazine Kosmoglott published in February 1922

In 1916, Russian artificial language enthusiasts founded the Kosmoglot Association in Saint Petersburg. Edgar von Wahl was not one of its founders, but later joined, as did the Estonian linguist Jakob Linzbach. Wahl became a spokesman for the "naturalistic school" of the association; thus paving the way for the creation of Occidental. With the revolutionary events of 1917 and the departure of its members from Saint Petersburg, the association's activities faded away, ending entirely in 1921, but picking up again in Tallinn in the same year. The association's activities were revived by Wahl together with Linzbach, and the association's name was changed to Kosmoglott. Ties were maintained with the former members of the association, which operated in several European countries. Wahl was also the editor of the Kosmoglott magazine published by the association from 1922 to 1926. In its first issue, Wahl introduced the artificial language he created, Occidental. From 1923 to 1928, he also promoted the language in the serial Occidental, unic natural, vermen neutral e max facil e comprensibil lingue por International relations. Wahl published a book in 1925 titled Radicarium directiv del lingue International (Occidental) in 8 languages.

=== Spread ===
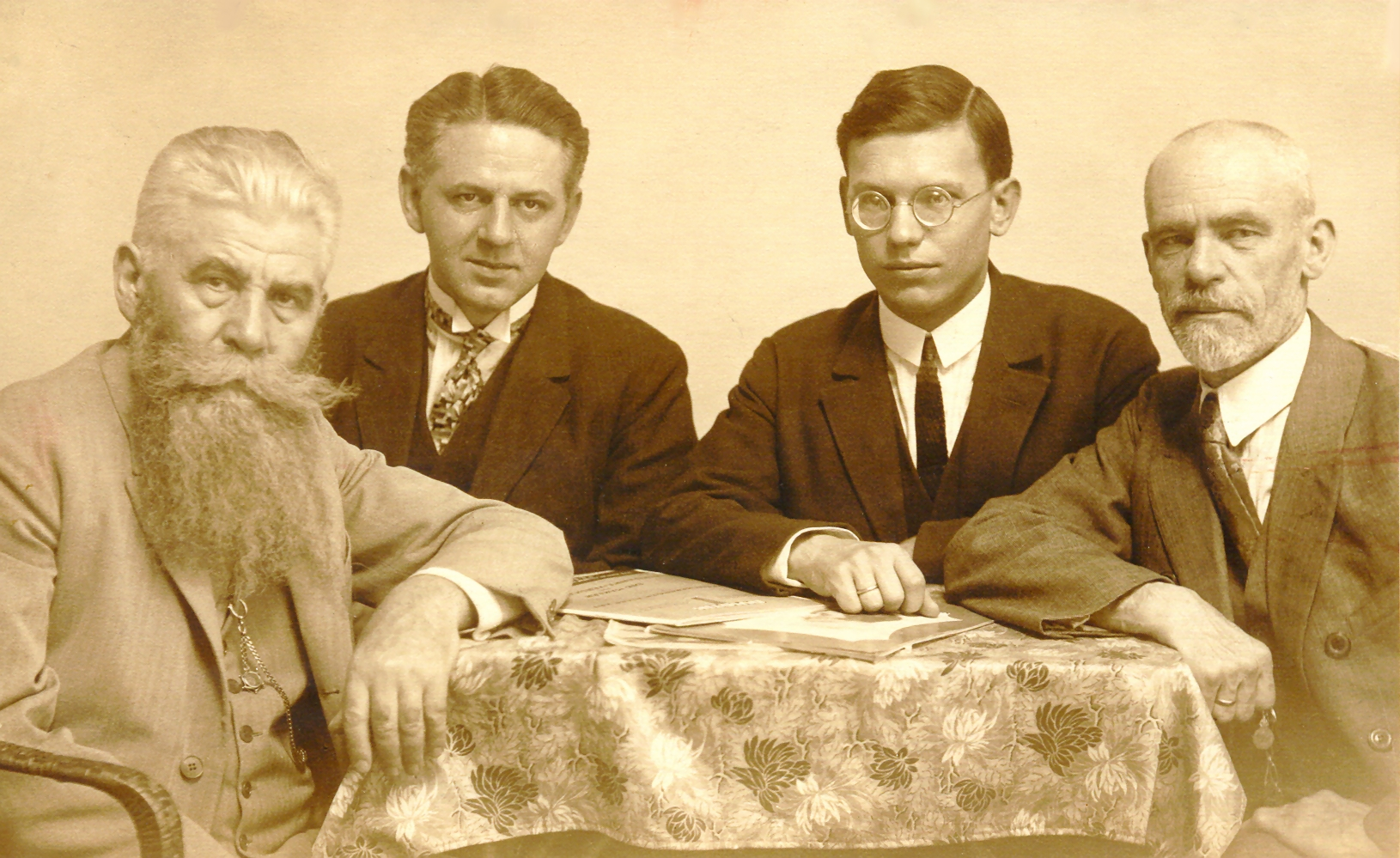
Occidentalists in Vienna in 1927: from left to right Hanns and Johann Robert Hörbiger, Engelbert Pigal and Edgar de Wahl

The first issue of the magazine Kosmoglott contained a letter sent to the League of Nations on 5 September 1921, recommending the introduction of a perfect language which would be easily acquired, not necessarily the most common planned language, for the communication between peoples. In order to find a suitable language, it was recommended that a competition be held and that the candidates be evaluated by a committee of experts convened by the League of Nations. The proposal was not taken up for consideration in the League of Nations.

Despite this failure, the Occidental language attracted interlinguists; in particular enthusiasts of Ido (the Esperantists remained faithful to their language). According to Ariste, internal disputes amongst the Idists and a personal appeal by Wahl led many to promote the language. In tandem with the growth of the language's popularity, the activity of Kosmoglott association diminished, and the December 1928 an event in commemoration of Waldemar Rosenberger, who had died 10 years earlier, took place being the last bigger event of the society.

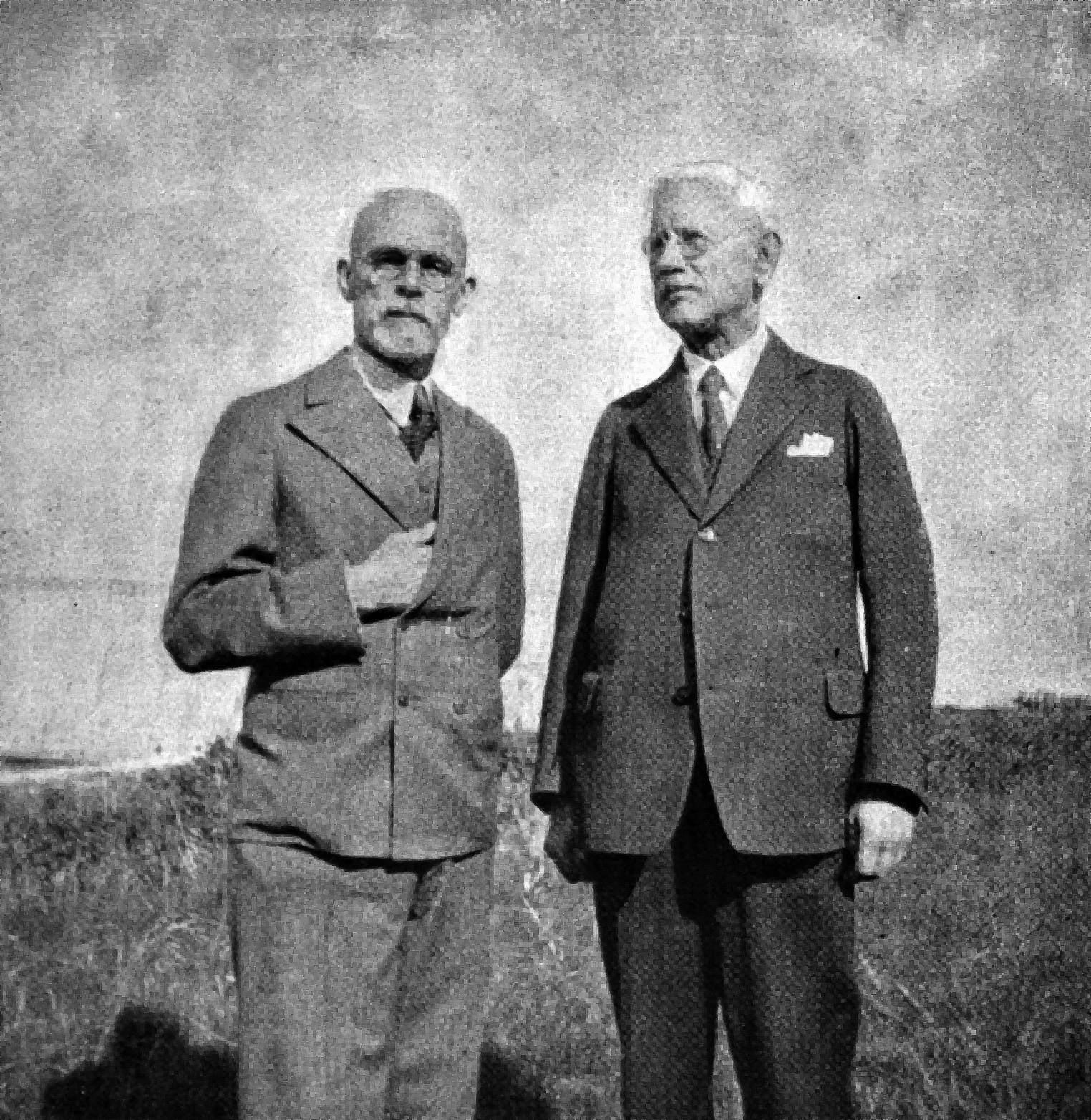
Edgar de Wahl (left) and Otto Jespersen

However, during the 1920s, new Occidental societies emerged. In 1927, the International Cosmoglotta Association was founded, which a year later was renamed Occidental-Union. Starting in 1927, Kosmoglott began to be published in Vienna (instead of Tallinn) under the new name Cosmoglotta. In the last issue published in Tallinn, Wahl published, among other things, Koidula's poem under the title "Max car donation" (Dearest Gift). The success of the new language brought international renown to Wahl. He spoke publicly in various European countries and communicated closely with linguists. In 1939, he was likely the only Estonian to be invited to the 5th Linguistic Conference in Brussels. During these times he was in active discussions with the Danish linguist and author of another planned language Novial Otto Jespersen which culminated in their meeting and the publication of its results as a separate book. However, unlike Jespersen, Wahl was an amateur linguist. His linguistic activities never reached broader theoretical linguistic problems, but were limited to constructing his own artificial language and tackling related issues.

Although Occidental showed significant success in the late 1920s and in 1930s, it never achieved the popularity of Esperanto. Unlike Esperanto, which became a popular language among labour movements, Occidental speakers in the interwar period were predominantly Western European intellectuals. Later, near and after Wahl's death, discussions started among Occidentalists about whether to change the name of the language. Ric Berger, a leading Occidentalist from Switzerland, cited reports from the Eastern Bloc that the name Occidental was a hindrance to promoting the language. Berger had also become fond of the language Interlingua that was nearing publication, and he began envisioning a possible fusion between the two languages. These two factors convinced Berger to begin advocating the new name Interlingue in February 1948. The change in name took effect in October of the following year, and the Occidental-Union became the Interlingue-Union, as it is today. The association has its own academy and the magazine Cosmoglotta continues to be published by the association.

== Personal life ==
=== Family ===
Edgar von Wahl married Maria von Hübbenet (the daughter of Grand Duchess Maria Pavlovna's personal physician), in Saint Petersburg in 1894. They had five children: Johann or Hans, Guido, Ellen, Anatol, and Lydia Maria. The marriage was dissolved in 1913, after which Johann, Guido and Lydia stayed with Edgar while Anatol stayed with his mother, who moved to Finland, and some time later Lydia Maria also went there. Wahl's two eldest sons moved to Germany at the start of World War I, where they served in the army. Guido spent a short vacation in Tallinn during the German occupation of Estonia during World War I, but at the end of 1918 he disappeared. According to one source he died in a battle with the Bolshevik Red Army near Tukums, Latvia in 1919.

In 1914, Edgar von Wahl married Agnes Riesenkampff. Like her husband, Agnes was a teacher, teaching gymnastics in Tallinn. In 1917, their daughter Veronika was born. The fate of Agnes was unclear for a long time. In 1946 it was suggested that she disappeared during the forced migrations of June 1941, but now it is known that she was arrested and shot by the NKVD in 1941.

=== Sailing ===
In addition to linguistics, Wahl was a hobby sailor. In 1895, he became a member of the Estonian Imperial Maritime Yacht Club, and in the following years was an active member, joining its technical committee and being the secretary of the club. He produced a yearbook dedicated to the club's 25th anniversary in 1913. In 1922, Wahl became an honorary member of the club. He owned several yachts over the years, one of which, a ketch called Auli, he is said to have designed himself.

== Works ==
- de Wahl, Edgar (1913). Kaiserlicher Estländischer See-Yacht-Club : historische Übersicht 1888-1913 [Royal Estonian Sea-Yacht-Club: A Historical Overview 1888-1913] (in German). Reval : Buchdruckerei Aug. Mickwitz. ISBN 978-9916-15-180-8.
- ——— (1925). Radicarium directiv del lingue international (occidental) : in 8 lingues [Directive dictionary of the International Language (Occidental) : in 8 languages] (in Interlingue). Tallinn. ISBN 978-9916-15-205-8.
- ——— (1928). Occidental: Gemeinverständliche europäische Kultursprache für internationalen Verkehr: Begründung, Grammatik, Wortbildung, vergleichende Textproben [Occidental: An Intelligible European cultural language for international communication: justification, grammar, word formation, comparative text samples] (in German). Reval; Mauer bei Wien: Kosmoglott.
- ———; Jespersen, Otto (1935). Discussiones inter E. de Wahl e O. Jespersen [Discussions between E. de Wahl and O. Jespersen] (in Interlingue). Occidental-Buro.
- ——— (1953). Spiritu de Interlingue [Spirit of Interlingue] (in Interlingue). Cheseaux-sur-Lausanne.

== See also ==
- De Wahl's rule, a rule for word formation in Interlingue devised by de Wahl.
