= Kivimäe =

Kivimäe may refer to:

- Kivimäe, Jõgeva County, village in Estonia
- Kivimäe, Tallinn, subdistrict of Tallinn
- Kivimäe (surname), Estonian surname
