= Wahl (noble family) =

Baltic German noble family

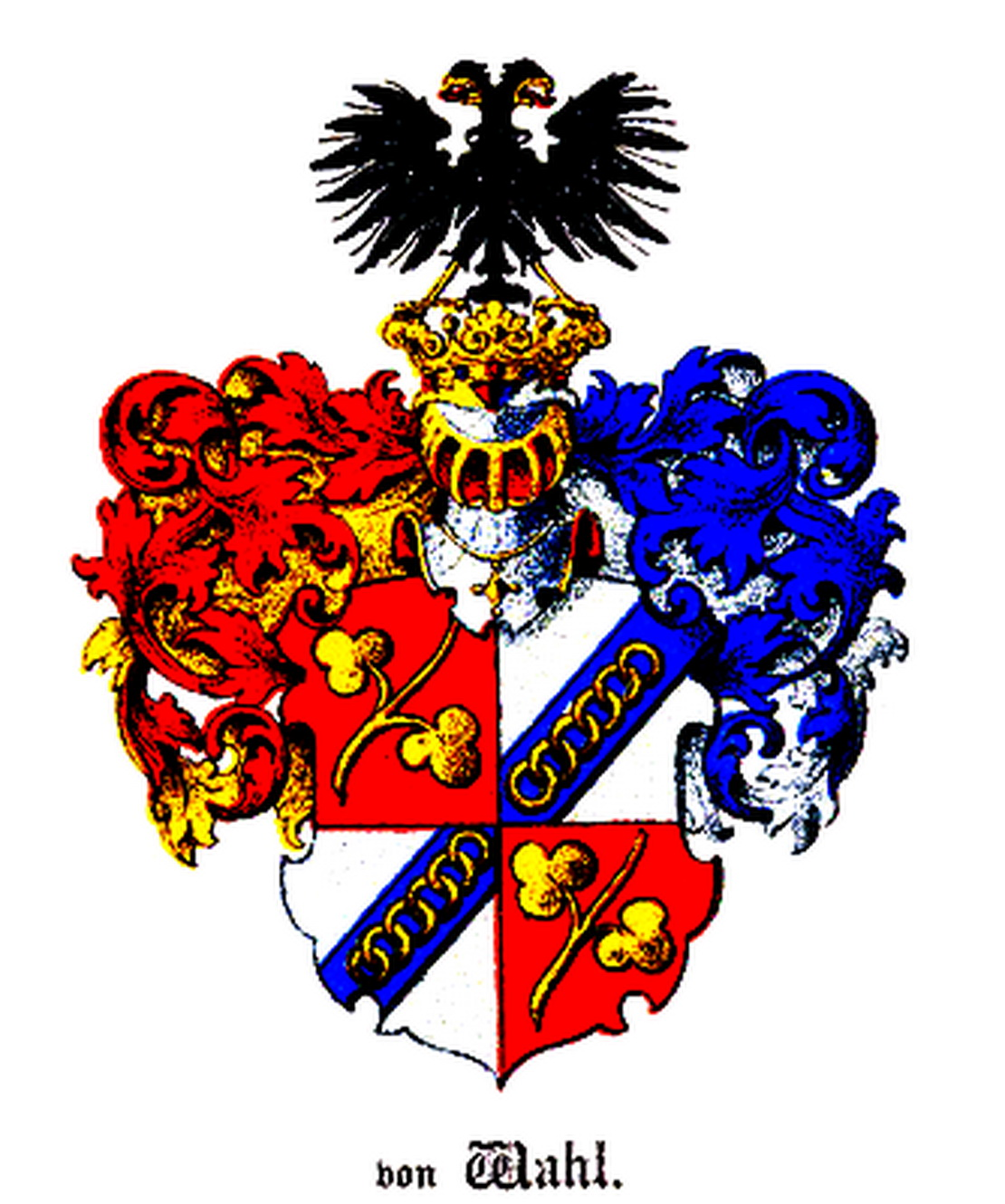
Coat of arms of the family (1795)

The Wahl family is a noble family originating in Scotland which later settled in the Baltic states.

== History ==
The von Wahl family is a branch of the old Scottish noble family "MacDowall" or "MacDougall of Makerstoun". The family originally came from Galloway on the Scottish west coast. In the Middle Ages, the Clan MacDowall had a significant position of power, beginning with Fergus of Galloway (1096–1161). As early as 1390, the Baron Archibald MacDowall was granted the Makerstoun estate on the River Tweed in the Borders area. With him begins the uninterrupted family lineage. The owners and Barons of Makerstoun had a hereditary seat in the Scottish feudal parliament. The branch of the MacDowalls of Makerstoun, Scotland, flourished until the end of the eighteenth century.

Around 1582, the Royal Scottish Officer and Captain Robert Albrecht MacDowall (1541–1641) emigrated from the more recent line of the house Makerstoun to Mecklenburg, Germany . Possibly he was, as the Clan Chief Uchtred MacDowall, Laird of Garthland, involved in the well-known "Raid of Ruthven" in 1582, a failed Protestant uprising against the King Jacob / James VI, so that Robert Albrecht had to flee Scotland. In Mecklenburg, he married Elsa von Bredow and Ursula von Stralendorff.

In 1594, Robert Albrecht entered service to Gustavus Adolphus of Sweden and for many years was Royal Administrator of Örbyhus Castle and Tierp Castle. Örbyhus Castle was a royal Swedish fortress with a garrison and state prison. The family resided in Sweden and later their name was changed to "Duwall". His sons, the Royal Swedish Colonel Mauritz Duwall (1603–1655), and his half brother, the Swedish General Jacob Duwall (1589–1634), were promoted to the Swedish nobility in 1638 as Swedish Knights for their service in the Thirty Years' War. In 1674, General Jacob Duwall was awarded the Swedish Freiherr (baron) posthumously for his military service, and was introduced as Freiherr of the Swedish Aristocracy. The last male Swedish descendants of the Duwalls died in 1923.

Of Robert Albrecht's nine sons, Mauritz Duwall and his half-brother Jacob Duwall founded the Swedish branch of the family. Jacob's half brother from his fathers marriage with Ursula von Stralendorff, was the royal Swedish Colonel of the Infantry, Axel Duwall (1595–1630) who represents the beginning of the German-Baltic Wahl family lineage.

Axel Duwall participated in 1628, as a Swedish Lieutenant-Colonel on the successful defense of Stralsund, Germany against the Imperial troops of the Field Marshall Albrecht von Wallenstein. In 1629 for his service, Axel Duwall was granted the estate of Hallkved in Uppland by the Swedish King Gustavus Adolphus. With his regiment, Axel Duwall, as Colonel of the Infantry, secured the bridgehead on the Peenestrom River and secured the landing of the Swedish army on the Island of Usedom on June 26, 1630. Axel Duwall was severely wounded and died in the conquest of the Pomeranian Wolgast Castle in July and died on September 6 of the same year. In the presence of King Gustavus Adolphus of Sweden, he was buried on 13 November 1630 in Stralsund. The tomb of Axel Duwall is located next to the tomb of his half-brother Jakob in the "Duwall's chapel" in the Nikolaikirche in Stralsund. Axel's grave site with a German inscription was restored by the von Wahl family.

Axel Duwall's only son, the Swedish Captain of the Dragoons, Joachim Adolf de / De Wall / Wahl (1631–1705), settled in the then Swedish Livonia after 1682. In the Northern War (1700–1721), he served in the Livonian Dragoon Regiment of General von Meyerfeldt.

Joachim Adolf's son, Johann Georg (1682–1735), also fought as a Swedish Dragoon in the Livonian Regiment of General von Schlippenbach in the Great Northern War against Tsarist Russia. He took part in several battles with his regiment, and also in the 1709 Battle of Poltava in the Ukraine where the Swedish army was defeated by Peter the Great. In 1710, Johann Georg was taken into Russian captivity when Peter the Great attacked the Swedish Vyborg Castle. Johann was not released until 1722.

Following defeat in the Great Northern War, the Kingdom of Sweden lost Estonia and Livonia through the Treaty of Nystad in 1721 to Russia. The Baltic Germans of the Eastern Provinces were granted self-government and the continuation of their Lutheran religion by the Tsar Peter the Great and his successors.

Johann Georgs son, Johann Heinrich von Wahl (1725–1795), became an administrator of several large estates in Livonia and received the German Nobility of the Holy Roman Empire in 1795.

His son Carl Gustav von Wahl (1766–1825), became a successful entrepreneur, which led to the acquisition of several large estates in the Estonian part of Livonia around Oberpahlen (Kawast, Pajus, Kawa, Köppo and Tappik). His six sons founded the various lines of the family, of which four still exist.

On account of his services to the Tsarist Russian Army and to the city of St. Petersburg during the Napoleonic Wars , Carl Gustav was given title into the Russian nobility in 1816.

Estates and manor houses

Until the expropriation of all German landowners by the newly founded republics of Estonia and Latvija in 1919/1920 the Wahl family owned the following estates and mansions: In Livonia: (Estonian district): Pajus with Luik, Addafer, Tappik with Toifer and Lane, Lustifer with Kalliküll, Surgefer, Wihelninenhof with Eduardshof and Karlswald, Neu Nursie, Quellenhof; (Latvijan district): Alt and Neu-Annenhof with Hermannshof. In Estonia: Annia, Assick with Wahlhof and Island Schildau. In Kurland: Blieden with Aahof. Altogether about 50,000 Hectar. All estates owned only for a short time are not mentioned. After the German reunification in Germany: Lausnitz in Thuringia and Friedrichsruh in Mecklenburg.

All estates were expropriated in 1919 as part of the Estonian land reform. All branches of the von Wahl family left Estonia and Latvia during the Second World War and emigrated to Germany, Spain, Canada, United States, Chile, and Australia.

== Coat of arms ==
The Scottish coat of arms, which was also used by the Swedish Duwalls, fell into oblivion in the Baltic branch of the family and was replaced by the new coat of arms awarded in 1795.

== Notable family members ==
- Robert Albrecht MacDowall / Dougall ad H. Makerstoun (1541–1641), Makerstoun, Royal Scottish Captain, Royal Swedish Official of Örbyhus and Tierp. He founded the two branches of the Swedish-Baltic family Duwall / v. Wahl
- Axel Duwall (1595–1630), Royal Swedish Colonel of the Infantry, Commander of the Västerbotten Infantry Regiment, friend of King Gustavus Adolphus of Sweden
- Johann Heinrich von Wahl (1725–1795), Successful farmer in Livonia, posthumous Reichsadelsstand 1795
- Karl-Gustav von Wahl (1766–1825), Entrepreneur and farmer, acquired many estates in Livonia, Russian nobility in 1816
- Viktor von Wahl Surgefer (1840–1915), Imperial Russian General of the Cavalry, City Commander of Saint Petersburg, Governor-General of Vilnius, Imperial Emperor of the Emperor Alexander III. , Member of the Reichsrat, Deputy Minister of the Interior of the Imperial Russia. The Jewish Bunt labour activist, Hirsh Lekert tried unsuccessfully to murder him in Vilnius.
- Otto von Wahl Kawast (1842–1884), Imperial Royal Cavalry Master, Imperial Russian Colonel
- Nikolai von Wahl Pajus (1833–1904), Landowner, Livonian politician and District Deputy of the Livonian Landtag
- Ernst von Wahl Assick (1878–1949), Imperial Russian General Major
- Wilhelm von Wahl Surgefer (1880–1944), Imperial Russian Colonel of the Cavalry, Commander of the Cavalry, Chief of Staff of the White Army of General Judenitsch in the Russian Civil War
- Eduard Georg von Wahl Lustifer-Haakhof (1833–1890), Medical Doctor and Surgeon, founder of the Psychiatric Clinic in Dorpat , Professor and Rector of the Imperial University of Dorpat
- Arthur von Wahl-Assick (1870–1951), Physician, Estonian Colonel of the Paramedics
- Alexander von Wahl (1839–1903), Sculptor of the Petersburger Kunstakademie as well as sculptor and painter of the Munich School , pupil of Peter Clodt von Jürgensburg and Max von Widnmann , Alexander Wagner and Wilhelm Diez , oil paintings owned by Prince Regent Luitpold of Bavaria , sculptures in the Estonian Kumu Museum in Tallinn
- Edgar von Wahl Assick (1867–1948), Mathematician, linguist and founder of the international language "Occidental" or " Interlingue "
- Helmuth Richard Alexander; Pakkast (1898-1976), Enlightened.
- Dietrich von Wahl Lustifer (1913–1999), Lawyer and Notary, President of the Bremen Bar Association, Vice-President of the Notarkammer, President of the Baltic Knights
- Ellen Delbriick, born by Wahl-Pajus (1907–1978), wife of the Nazi opponent and resistance fighter Justus Delbrück, Reg.Rat aD (1902–1945), brother of Emmi Bonhoeffer née Delbriick (1905–1991) and Max Delbrück (1906–1981), brother of Klaus Bonhoeffer (1901–1945)
- Otto von Wahl Pajus (1914–1984), Lawyer and Notary, Counselor and City Councilor in Schleswig , Major of the Reserve, re-founder of the Wahl family organization after The Second World War, discoverer of the port facilities of Haithabu and the Viking ships.
- Klaus von Wahl Pajus (1923–1997), Film Director, and Screenwriter of numerous well-known English and American films (eg The Flight of the Phoenix (1965) , The Man Who Shot Liberty Valance (1962) , A Pajama for Two (1961) , The Man Who Knew Too Much (1956) , His or Not Being (1960), Dallas (1978–1991) )
- Siegfried von Wahl Assick (1928–2016), Mining Engineer, Professor of Mining at the TU Clausthal
- Erik von Wahl Lustifer (born 1934), Lawyer, Ltd. Reg. Dir., Vice-President of the Wehrbereichsverwaltung I in Kiel
- Wolf von Wahl Lustifer (born 1942), Mathematician, Professor and Dean at the University of Bayreuth

== See also ==
- Clan Macdowall
