= Kivimägi =

Family name

Origin
- Language: Estonian
- Meaning: "stone mountain"
- Region of origin: Estonia

Other names
- Variant form: Kivimäe

Kivimägi is an Estonian toponymic surname meaning "stone mountain"; a compound of kivi ("stone") and mägi ("mountain").

As of 1 January 2021, 105 men and 100 women have the surname Kivimägi in Estonia. Kivimägi ranks 771st for men and 932th for women in the distribution of surnames in the country. The surname Kivimägi is the commonly found in Järva County, where 5.69 per 10,000 inhabitants of the county bear the name.

Notabale people with the surname Kivimägi include:

- Agu Kivimägi (born 1963), Estonian computer scientist
- Roman Kivimägi (1900–1928), Estonian wrestler
- Tatjana Kivimägi (née Novoseltseva; born 1984), Russian-Estonian high jumper
- Toomas Kivimägi (born 1963), Estonian politician and jurist
