= Paul Johansen =

Estonian and German historian (1901–1965)

- Born: December 23, 1901; Tallinn, Governorate of Estonia, Russian Empire
- Died: April 14, 1965 (aged 63); Hamburg, West Germany
- Occupation: Historian
- Children: Ulla Johansen
- Father: Jens Christian Johansen
- Relatives: Ingeborg Johansen

Paul Wulff Johansen (December 23, 1901 – April 14, 1965) was an Estonian and German historian of Danish origin.

== Early life and education ==
Paul Johansen was born in Tallinn to Jens Christian Johansen, a Danish land improvement engineer. He was the brother of the writer Ingeborg Johansen. He studied at Tallinn Cathedral School and graduated in 1919. In the summer of the same year, he joined the Estonian People's Army as a student soldier, but he did not serve on the fronts of the War of Independence. At the end of 1919, he began studying in Copenhagen and soon in Germany, initially as an agricultural engineer, but he soon abandoned this direction in favor of history. In 1924, Johansen became a doctor of history at the University of Leipzig, and in 1924 he presented his dissertation Siedlung und Agrarwesen der Esten im Mittelalter (Settlement and Agriculture of Estonians in the Middle Ages) and received the research degree of doctor of philosophy (dr. phil.). He returned to Estonia and started working at the Tallinn City Archives.

== Career ==
Paul Johansen soon became one of the most important Estonian historians. He studied a huge amount of materials on both the older history of Tallinn, especially the history of settlement, and agrarian history, and he was one of the founders of this branch of study in Estonia. He made an important contribution to the study and interpretation of the agrarian and settlement history material found in the Danish Census Book, which resulted in a comprehensive overview of the settlement and agrarian conditions in northern Estonia in the 13th century. Johansen also drew attention to the Wanradt–Koell Catechism as the first definitely known partially Estonian-language publication. His greatest work was the settlement-history work Die Estlandliste des Liber Census Daniae, which was published in 1933 and explained many settlement-related issues in the areas of northern Estonia that had been under the Danish Kingdom. Johansen also discovered the founding document of the town of Paide in the Swedish archives and made other important discoveries. In 1934 he became the city archivist of Tallinn.

At the end of 1939, Johansen moved to Germany with other Baltic Germans and continued his work as a historian at the University of Hamburg. From 1942 to 1945, he was forced to serve as an interpreter on the German Eastern Front. In 1944, he also visited Estonia for the last time.

From 1945 to 1946, Johansen was a prisoner of war, and he then returned to the University of Hamburg, where he taught until his death. In Hamburg, he also worked diligently in the Hanseatic History Society. In 1951, his book Nordische Mission, Revals Gründung und die Schwedensiedlung in Estland (The Nordic Mission, Tallinn's Founding, and the Swedish settlement in Estonia) was published in Stockholm, in which, among other things, he hypothesized that Tallinn had grown out of two settlement nuclei, one Scandinavian (Oleviste / St. Olai) and one German (Niguliste / St. Nikolai). In 1964, Johansen put forward the hypothesis that Balthasar Russow might be of Estonian origin. However, both this study and several other works (such as the study of the life and activities of Henrik of Latvia) remained unfinished because he died in the spring of the following year. Johansen also associated Tallinn with the notable Renaissance painter Michael Sittow, whose portraits had previously been attributed to a Flemish master.

== Selected works ==
- Siedlung und Agrarwesen der Esten im Mittelalter (Settlement and Agriculture of the Estonians in the Middle Ages; Tartu, 1925)
- Über die Schweden bei Reval (The Swedes at Tallinn; = Beiträge zur Kunde Estlands 11; Tallinn, 1925/1926)
- Die Estlandliste der Liber Census Daniae (The Estonia List of the Danish Census Book; Copenhagen and Tallinn, 1933)
- Bruchstücke des Landbuches der Ordensmeister für Rujen und Helmet (Fragments of the Land Register of the Order Masters for Rūjiena and Helme; = Beiträge zur Kunde Estlands 21(1); Tallinn, 1937)
- Deutsch und Undeutsch im mittelalterlichen und frühneuzeitlichen Reval (German and Non-German in Medieval and Early Modern Tallinn; with Heinz von zur Mühlen; Cologne and Vienna, 1973)
- Balthasar Rüssow als Humanist und Geschichtsschreiber (Balthasar Russow as a Humanist and Historian; = Quellen und Studien zur Baltischen Geschichte 14; ed. Heinz von zur Mühlen; Cologne, 1996)
- Taani ja Eesti (Denmark and Estonia; Tallinn, 1996)
- Kaugete aegade sära (The Luster of Distant Times; = Eesti mõttelugu 65; with Jüri Kivimäe; Tartu 2006)
