= Ulla Johansen =

Estonian-born German ethnologist (1927–2021)

- Born: 17 June 1927; Tallinn, Estonia
- Died: 14 February 2021 (aged 93); Cologne, North Rhine-Westphalia, Germany
- Occupation: Ethnologist
- Father: Paul Johansen

Ulla Johansen (17 June 1927 – 14 February 2021) was an Estonian-born German ethnologist.

== Biography ==
Johansen's mother was of German and Estonian descent, and her father, Paul Johansen, was of Danish descent. Due to the occupation of Estonia by the Soviet Union as part of the Molotov–Ribbentrop Pact, her family moved to Nazi Germany in 1939. After World War II, she began studying in Hamburg in 1947. Her father found a job as a professor and recommended her to study ethnology, which would become her major. After she completed her doctorate, she became a translator for the German Red Cross before serving as a scientific assistant at the Museum am Rothenbaum from 1954 to 1955. After that, she conducted field research in Turkey, where she lived with a family of nomads and was a visiting professor in Istanbul in 1970.

Johansen directed the ethnology department at the University of Cologne from 1973 to 1990 and served on the ethnology committee of the German Research Foundation from 1976 to 1980. From 1981 to 2001, she was on the selection committee of the Alexander von Humboldt Foundation and chaired the Deutsche Gesellschaft für Sozial- und Kulturanthropologie from 1985 to 1989. In 2018, she was presented with a gold medal from the Russian Geographical Society by Russian President Vladimir Putin.

Ulla Johansen died in Cologne on 14 February 2021 at the age of 93.

== Works ==
- Die Ornamentik der Jakuten (1954)
- Uued teooriad ja meetodid etnoloogias (1991)
- Beruf und Ethik. Kriterien sozialer Schichtung bei Kleinstädtern in Estland (1994)
- Der eurasiatische Schamanismus (2000)
- Tibetische Religionen und der Schamanismus (2000)
- Network Analysis and Ethnographic Problems. Process Models of a Turkish Nomad Clan (2004)
- Türkiye’de yörüklerin yayla hayatı – elli yil önce (2005)
