= Viktor von Wahl =

Russian general and politician (1840–1915)

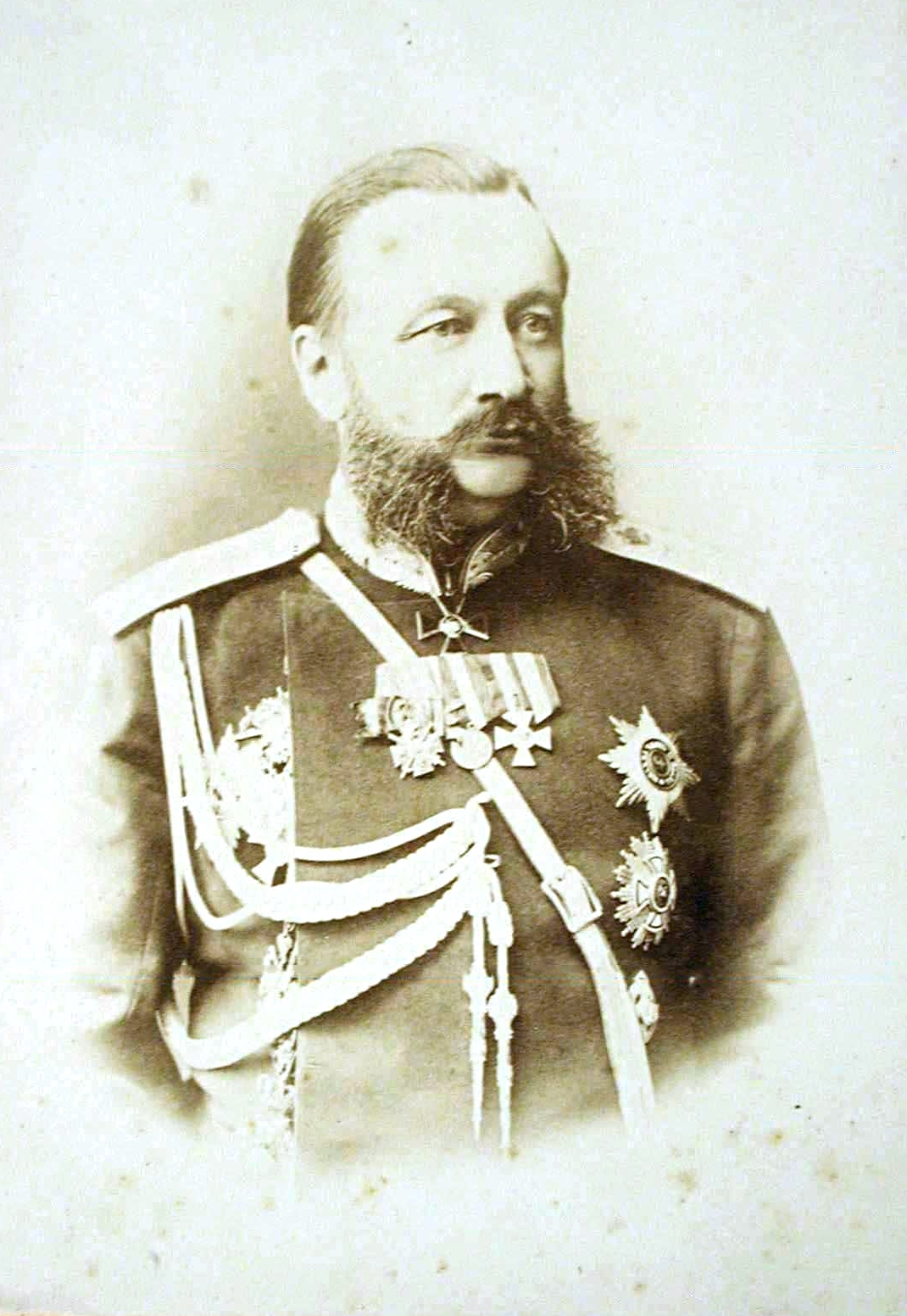
Viktor von Wahl in 1893.

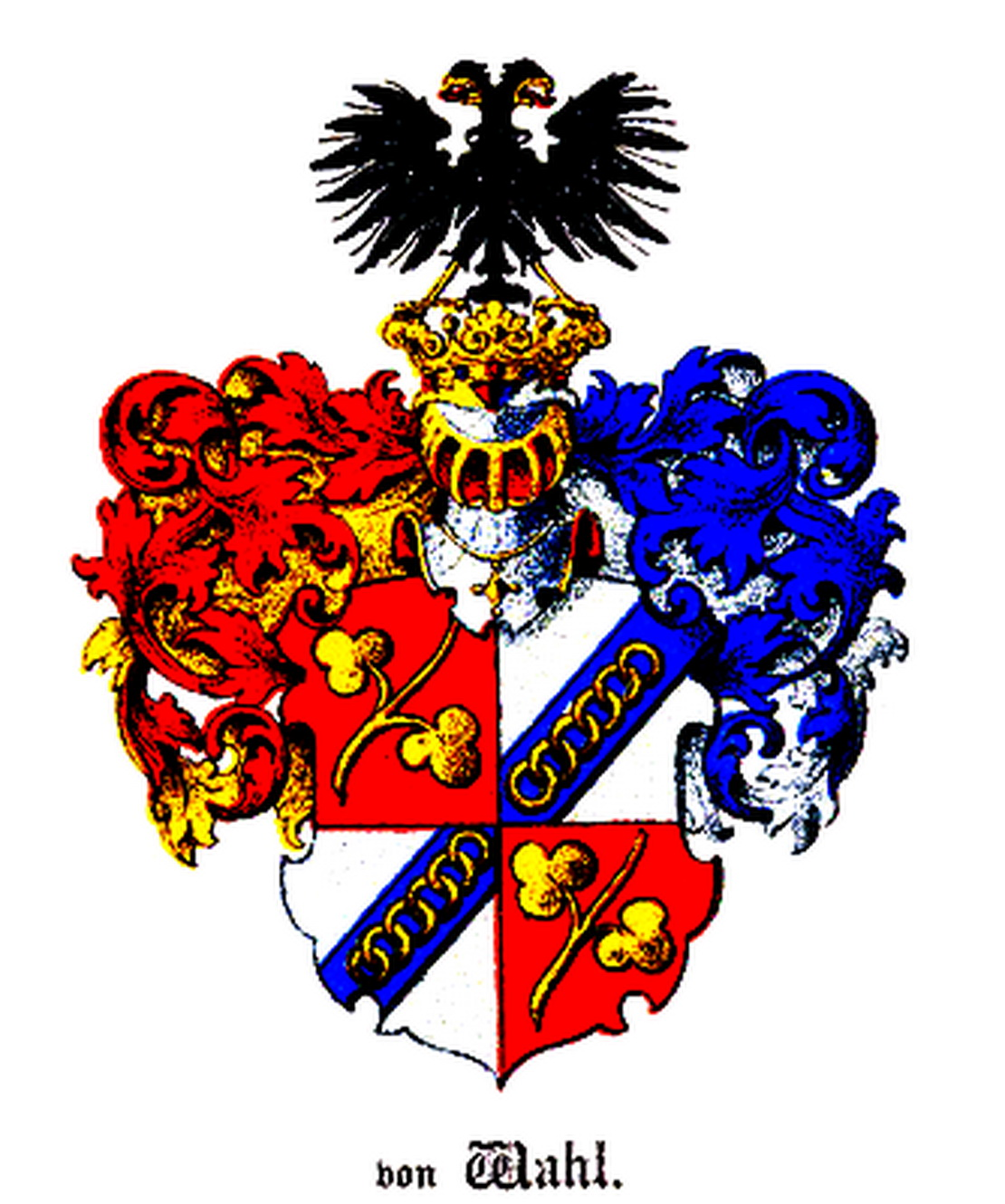
Coat of arms of the Wahl family of 1796, in the Baltic Coat of arms book by Carl Arvid von Klingspor in 1882.

Viktor Karl Konrad Wilhelm von (Note: In German personal names, von is a preposition which approximately means 'of' or 'from' and usually denotes some sort of nobility. While von (always lower case) is part of the family name or territorial designation, not a first or middle name, if the noble is referred to by their last name, use Schiller, Clausewitz or Goethe, not von Schiller, etc.) Wahl (Russian: Виктор Вильгельмович Валь, romanized: Viktor Vigelmovich Val; 1840–1915) was a Russian politician and general of Baltic German descent who served as the mayor of St. Petersburg and the governor of Vilna Governorate.

== Life ==
He came from the Wahl family, which belonged to the Baltic German nobility and was a branch of the Scottish MacDowall clan. Von Wahl had also been a director of the Kseniinsky Institute, an exclusive school for aristocratic women.

Wahl became the governor of Vilna Governorate in the autumn of 1901. In 1902, he ordered the arrest and flogging of a number of Jewish and Polish workers who had taken part in a May Day parade. That same year, a Bundist worker, Hirsh Lekert, unsuccessfully attempted to assassinate him, wounding him in the leg and arm. Lekert was tried by military court, sentenced to death and executed.

Von Wahl became a member of the State Council in 1903, and held the title of Assistant Minister of the Interior and Commander of the Gendarme Corps after 1902.

He was awarded the Order of Prince Danilo I and a number of other decorations.

== Sources ==
- V.I. Gurko. Features and Figures of the Past; Government and Opinion in the Reign of Nicholas II
- Profiles of a Lost World: Memoirs of East European Jewish Life Before World War II; Hirsz Abramowicz, Eva Zeitlin Dobkin, Dina Abramowicz, Jeffrey Shandler, David E. Fishman, Yivo; Institute for Jewish Research; Wayne State University Press; 1999; p. 132
- Klingspor, Carl Arvid (1882). Baltic heraldic coat of arms all, belonging to the knighthoods of Livonia, Estonia, Courland and Oesel noble families. Stockholm.
