= Sirje Kivimäe =

Estonian historian (born 1947)

- Born: April 8, 1947 (age 78)
- Occupation: Historian
- Spouse: Jüri Kivimäe

Sirje Kivimäe (born April 8, 1947) is an Estonian historian.

== Career ==
Kivimäe has worked as a history lecturer at the University of Tartu and as a teacher at Tallinn Secondary School No. 32. Her research focuses on Baltic Germans and women that are marginalized in Estonian society today. She founded the Baltic German Cultural Society in 1988, and she serves as its chair.

== Awards and recognitions ==
- 1996: Order of Merit of the Federal Republic of Germany, 1st Class
- 1998: Mother of the Year

== Family ==
Sirje Kivimäe's husband is the historian Jüri Kivimäe.

== Publications ==
- 1994: (editor) Liivimaa üldkasulik ja ökonoomiline sotsieteet 200. Akadeemilise Baltisaksa Kultuuri Seltsi konverentsi materjale, 25. september 1992 (Livonian Public Benefit and Economic Society 200th Academic Baltic German Cultural Society Conference Materials, September 25, 1992). Tartu: Livländische Gemeinnützige und Ökonomische Sozietät. 151 pages.
- 2006: Paul Johansen. Kaugete aegade sära (The Luster of Distant Times), = Eesti mõttelugu 65. Compiled, foreword, and afterword by Jüri Kivimäe. Translated by Jüri Kivimäe, Sirje Kivimäe, and Eerik-Niiles Kross. Tartu: Ilmamaa. 528 pages.
