= Ingeborg Johansen =

Danish writer (1896–1986)

- Born: September 26, 1896; Riga, Latvia
- Died: January 23, 1986 (aged 89)
- Occupation: Writer
- Father: Jens Christian Johansen
- Relatives: Paul Johansen

Ingeborg Johansen (September 26, 1896 – January 23, 1986) was a Danish writer. She also used the pseudonyms Harriet Holm and Helene Paider.

== Early life and education ==
Ingeborg Johansen was born in Riga, the second child of Jens Christian Johansen, a Danish engineer and consul general in the Baltics. She was the sister of the historian Paul Johansen. She attended primary school in Tallinn and completed secondary school in Denmark, and then she began university studies in literature and classical languages.

== Career ==
Under the name Harriet Holm, Johansen first published some short stories in the newspaper Sorø Amtstidende in 1916. The following year, her debut novel, Den røde Villa (The Red Villa), was published.

Johansen translated Russian literature into Danish, especially the works of Ivan Turgenev.

== Works ==
- Den røde Villa (The Red Villa), novel, 1917
- Satan, novel, 1919
- Det forheksede Land (The Haunted Land), novel trilogy, 1944–1946:
  - Familien paa Lipfer (The Lipfer Family)
  - Dimitri Falen
  - Edith
- De lyksalige øer. Digte og prosa (The Blissful Islands. Poems and Prose), 1952
- Uvirkelighedens faser (Phases of Unreality), novel, 1967
- Fra arken til det nye land (From the Ark to the New Land), novel, 1969
- Manden med noderullen (The Man with the Music Roll), novel, 1971
- Joaweski (Joaveski), novel, 1972
- Fru Teil i Tallinn (Mrs. Teil in Tallinn), novel, 1974
- En periode med Paulette (A Period with Paulette), novel, 1976
- "Unge piger" (Young Girls), a story in the collection Når mænd elsker mænd og kvinder elsker kvinder. 160 års danske fortællinger om bøsser og lesbiske (When Men Love Men and Women Love Women. 160 Years of Danish Stories about Gays and Lesbians), 2003

== Awards ==
- 1949: Herman Bang Memorial Scholarship
- 1967: Danish Arts Foundation Award
- 1970: Danish Arts Foundation Award for the novel Fra arken til det nye land (From the Ark to the New Land)
