= Tallinn City Archives =

Archive in Tallinn

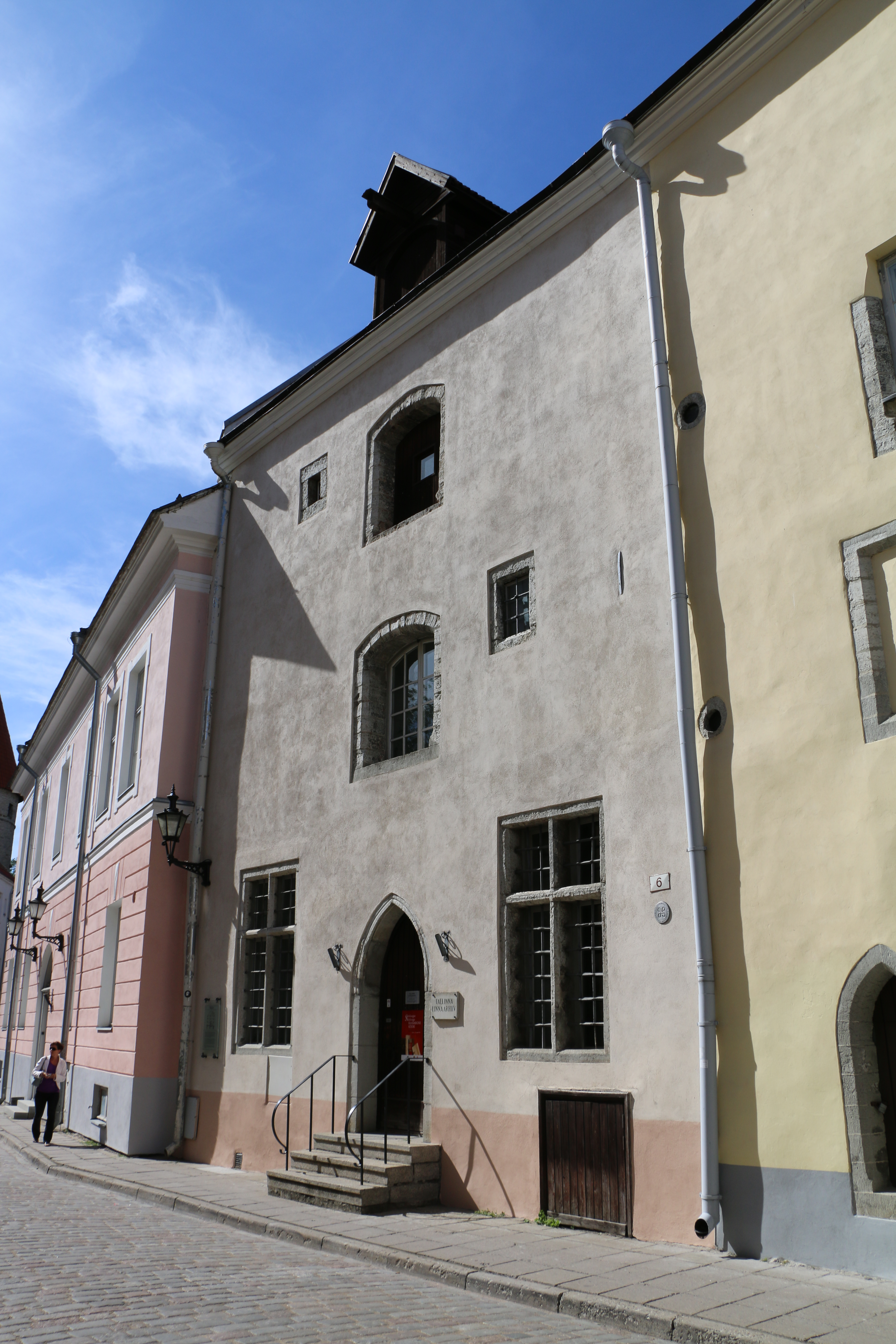
- Tallinn City Archives
- Interactive map of Tallinn City Archives
- 59°26′31″N 24°44′53″E
- Location: Tolli 6, 10133 Tallinn, Estonia, Tallinn, Estonia
- Website: www.tallinn.ee/eng/arhiivindus/tallinn-city-archives

Tallinn City Archives (Estonian: Tallinna linnaarhiiv) is an archive in Tallinn, Estonia. According to the archive's statute its purposes are as follows: "collect, organize and preserve the archival materials of historical and ongoing municipal institutions of Tallinn, as well as other records of archival value which are important to the study of the City of Tallinn and its history, and guarantee public access to them".

== Directors ==
- 1883–1887 Theodor Schiemann
- 1887–1900 Gotthard von Hansen
- 1900–1934 Otto Greiffenhagen
- 1934–1939 Paul Johansen
- 1939–1944 Rudolf Kenkmaa
- 1944–1950 Epp Siimo
- 1950–1962 Alide Vain
- 1962–1989 Edda-Cary Vendla
- 1989–1996 Jüri Kivimäe
- 1996–2007 Urmas Oolup
- 2009– Küllo Arjakas
