= Inna Põltsam-Jürjo =

Estonian historian (born 1969)

- Born: Inna Põltsam; August 23, 1969 (age 57)
- Occupation: Historian
- Spouse: Indrek Jürjo (2004–2009)

Inna Põltsam-Jürjo (born August 23, 1969) is an Estonian historian.

== Early life and education ==
Põltsam enrolled at the University of Tartu in 1987 and graduated in 1992 with a degree in history. She received a master's degree in 1996. In 2008, she defended her dissertation at Tallinn University on the history of New Pärnu in the 16th century. Her supervisor was Jüri Kivimäe, and her committee members were Juhan Kreem and Enn Küng.

== Career ==
In 1993, Põltsam-Jürjo started working at the Institute of History of the Estonian Academy of Sciences in Tallinn. She studies the history of medieval Livonia, especially the history of cities.

She is a member of the Baltic Historical Committee, a founding member of the Center for Medieval Studies at Tallinn University and the Center for Environmental History, and a member of the Baltic German Cultural Society.

== Publications ==
- 1995: Söömine ja joomine hiliskeskaegses Tallinnas (Eating and Drinking in Late Medieval Tallinn). Master's thesis. Tartu: Tartu Ülikooli kirjastus. Reprint: Tallinn: Argo, 2002.
- 1997: "14. sajandi teine pool Liivimaa linnade ajaloos linnadepäevade materjalide põhjal" (The Second Half of the Fourteenth Century in the History of Livonian Towns Based on Materials from Town Congresses). Acta Historica Tallinnensia 1: 20–37.
- 1998: (with Jüri Kivimäe, Aivar Kriiska, and Aldur Vunk) Merelinn Pärnu (The Maritime City of Pärnu). Pärnu: Pärnu Linnavalitsus.
- 1999: "Tallinn ja orduvõim 1346–1561" (Tallinn and the Rule of the Order 1346–1561). Acta Historica Tallinnensia 3: 3–17.
- 2001: "Pärnu linna ajaloo allikad 13.-16. sajandini. I osa = Quellen zur Geschichte der Stadt Pernau 13.–16. Jahrhundert. Band I" (Sources on the History of the Town of Pärnu from the Thirteenth to the Sixteenth Century. Part I). Compiled with Aldur Vunk. Pärnu: Pärnu Muuseum, 2001
- 2008: Liivimaa väikelinn varajase uusaja lävel. Uurimus Uus-Pärnu ajaloost 16. sajandi esimesel poolel (A Small Town in Livonia on the Threshold of the Early Modern Era. A Study of the History of New Pärnu in the First Half of the Sixteenth Century). Dissertation. Supervisor: Jüri Kivimäe. Tallinn: Tallinn University.
- 2020: Viin, vein ja vesi: joogikultuur Eestis kesk- ja varauusajal (Vodka, Wine, and Water: Drinking Culture in Estonia in the Middle Ages and Early Modern Era). Tallinn: Argo.

== Personal ==
Inna Põltsam-Jürjo was married to the historian Indrek Jürjo from 2004 to 2009.
