= Kivimäe (surname) =

Kivimäe is an Estonian surname, meaning "stone hill". Notable people with the surname include:

- Jüri Kivimäe (born 1947), Estonian historian and archivist
- Sirje Kivimäe (born 1947), Estonian historian
