= Jens Christian Johansen =

Danish engineer and consul (1868–1929)

- Born: September 20, 1868; Slagelse, Denmark
- Died: January 29, 1929 (aged 60); Tallinn, Estonia
- Resting place: Rahumäe Cemetery
- Occupation: Engineer
- Children: Ingeborg Johansen, Paul Johansen

Jens Christian Johansen (September 20, 1868 – January 29, 1929) was a Danish land improvement engineer and the Danish honorary consul general in Estonia from 1918 to 1929.

== Early life and education ==
Johansen was born in Slagelse, Denmark, the son of Hans Charles Jacob Wulff Johansen (1832–1874) and Christine Marie Johansen (née Hauberg, 1846–1885). He studied to be a land improvement engineer in Copenhagen, and in 1892 he started working in the Vitebsk Governorate. There he distinguished himself as a successful land improvement engineer, and the Baltic German–led Livonian and Estonian Rural Improvement Bureau invited him to head its Tallinn department in 1901.

== Career ==
In 1910, Johansen began working under the Estonian Noble Estate Credit Union, continuing to organize land improvement work.

In 1915, Johansen traveled to Denmark, but his family remained in Estonia. In 1916, when he wanted to visit his family, the Russian authorities did not allow him to do so, allegedly because he was in the service of the Baltic Germans. It was only at the end of 1918, after Estonia's de facto independence, that he managed to return to Tallinn.

Because the situation was chaotic and the Danes in Estonia were in serious danger due to the Red Army's offensive, the Danish state decided to appoint Johansen as honorary consul general as a man familiar with Estonian conditions. Initially, he was appointed temporarily, and later permanently. During the early years of his consulship, he continued to be employed by the nobility, probably also because he did not receive a salary while serving as honorary consul. His views toward the Estonian state were initially doubtful, and his perspective was probably influenced by the Baltic Germans with whom he had close contacts. In the autumn of 1919, he left the service of the Baltic Germans because the nobility had lost its meaning as an estate organization and the Baltic Germans that had interacted with him had become politicized. Johansen, however, wanted to avoid direct connections with a political party.

Around 1923, Johansen finally accepted Estonia as a state and then worked as the honorary consul of Denmark in Estonia without a salary until his death. In addition, he ran the (agency-collection financing) limited partnership J. C. Johansen Ko., located at Uus tänav 14.

Johansen died of a heart attack at the Greiffenhagen Clinic.

== Awards ==
- 1921: Order of the Estonian Red Cross, 3rd class
- 1925: Cross of Liberty, 3rd class, 2nd class

== Family ==
Johansen had three children. His son Karl Adam Johansen (1894–1942) died in the Gulag, his daughter Ingeborg Johansen (1896–1986) was a writer (also under the pseudonym Edith Paider), and his son Paul Johansen (1901–1965) was a well-known historian.
