= Hirsh Lekert =

Lithuanian Jewish Bundist (died 1902)

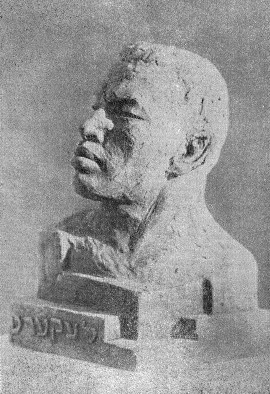
Hirsh Lekert.

Hirsh Lekert (born 1880 in Onuškis, in the Troksky Uyezd of Vilna Governorate died June 10, 1902, in Vilnius) was a Jewish socialist activist and member of the Bund.

== Biography ==
Lekert was an illiterate shoemaker who was active in the Bund since his youth. On May 24, 1900, he led a group of people in an attack on a police station in Vilnius and released three arrested workers. He was caught and exiled to Yekaterinoslav. He escaped in 1902 and came to Vilnius.

On May 18, 1902, he carried out an unsuccessful assassination attempt of the governor of Vilnius, General Victor von Wahl. When von Wahl, who had previously been a mayor of St. Petersburg, was made governor of the city, the Bund had organized demonstrations against him. Later von Wahl was responsible for repressive measures directed at Vilnius's workers, and the Bund in particular. Von Wahl ordered the arrest and flogging of a number of Jewish and Polish workers who had taken part in the May Day parade in 1902. Because of the practices of his administration, plots for his assassination began to be formed soon after his arrival. Lekert, together with several other Bund members began watching von Wahl's movements, bought weapons and trained in forests outside of Vilna.

However, most of the formal plans fell through and Lekert's attempt was made without any preparation. Lekert, who was working as a shoemaker at the time, fired a pistol twice at the governor as von Wahl was exiting the circus show, wounding him in the leg and arm. Lekert was immediately arrested, beaten, then transferred to the city's prison.

Under pressure from the Minister of the Interior, Vyacheslav von Plehve, Hirsh Lekert was tried by a military court. He was convicted and sentenced to death by hanging. At his trial, Lekert, despite the advice of a local rabbi, refused to ask for forgiveness and gave an eloquent speech on the dignity of the Jewish worker.

The sentence was carried out on June 10, 1902. Subsequently, Hirsh Lekert became a folk hero to some in the workers' movement. Several dramas in Yiddish and many poems were written as a tribute to him. The most well known of these is the poem by Abraham Suckewer "די לערערין מיראַ" (Di Lererin Mira - The Teacher Mira).
