= Kivimäe, Jõgeva County =

Village in Estonia

Coordinates: 58°40′N 26°36′E

Kivimäe
- Village
- Interactive map of Kivimäe
- Country: Estonia
- County: Jõgeva County
- Parish: Jõgeva Parish

Population
  - Total: 25
- Time zone: UTC+2 (EET)
  - Summer (DST): UTC+3 (EEST)

Kivimäe is a village in Jõgeva Parish, Jõgeva County in eastern Estonia.
