= Jüri Kivimäe =

Estonian historian and archivist (born 1947)

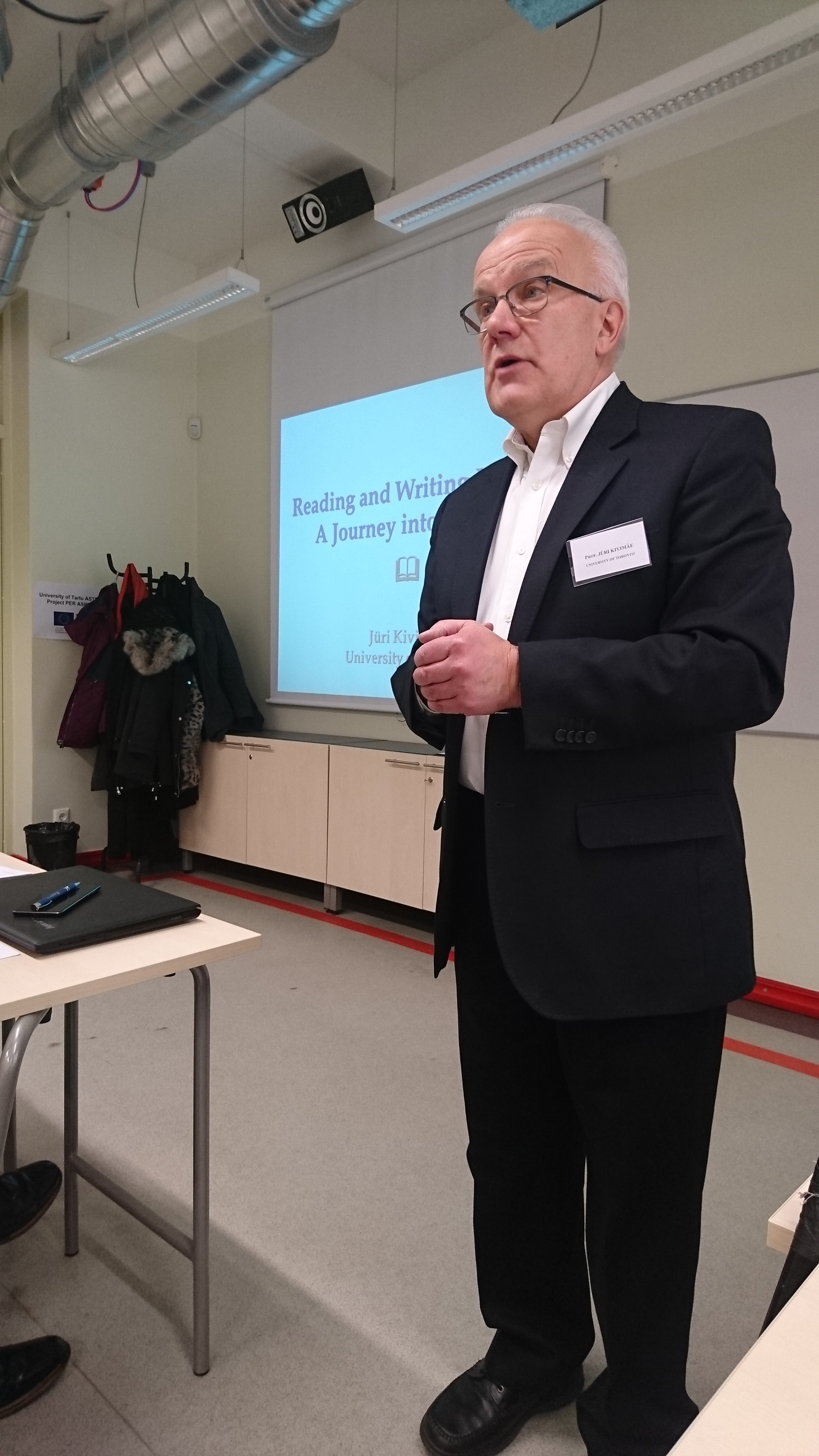
- Jüri Kivimäe in 2018
- Born: August 17, 1947 (age 78); Pärnu, Estonia
- Occupations: Historian and archivist
- Spouse: Sirje Kivimäe
- Relatives: Mart Kivimäe

Jüri Kivimäe (born August 17, 1947) is an Estonian historian and archivist.

== Early life and education ==
Kivimäe was born in Pärnu and grew up in Tootsi. After graduating from primary school in Tootsi, he studied at Pärnu High School from 1962 to 1965, and then at Tartu State University from 1965 to 1970, where he graduated as a historian and history teacher. His thesis dealt with the history of the Tartu Jesuit College in the 16th century.

== Career ==
After graduating from the university, Kivimäe worked in Tallinn from 1970 to 1975 as the history and philosophy editor for the Estonian Soviet Encyclopedia at the Valgus publishing house. From 1975 to 1990, he was a research fellow at the Institute of History of the Estonian Academy of Sciences.

In 1981, he defended his thesis on the history of Narva trade and trade policy in the 16th century, which he completed under the supervision of Enn Tarvel. In 1996, Kivimäe became a full professor of general history at the University of Tartu. Since 1999, he has been a professor of history at the University of Toronto and the head of the Elmar Tampõld Chair of Estonian Studies, mainly teaching the history of the Baltics, including the Hanseatic League, and the old Livonian chronicles.

In addition to the University of Tartu and University of Toronto, Kivimäe has taught at Tallinn University, the University of Tampere, the University of Turku, and the University of Latvia, and he has been a research fellow in Sweden and Germany.

His main field of research is the ancient history of Livonia. He has also dealt with issues of 20th-century Estonian history such as the resettlement of Baltic Germans, the March 1944 bombing of Tallinn, the history of historiography, and the events of 1905.

== Family ==
Jüri Kivimäe's wife is the historian Sirje Kivimäe and his brother is the historical philosopher Mart Kivimäe.

== Awards ==
- 1998: Tartu University Medal
- 1999: Order of the White Star, 3rd Class
- 2015: Order of the City of Tallinn

== Publications ==
- 1974: "Teated eestikeelsest trükisest 1525" (Information about the Estonian-Language Publication of 1525). Keel ja Kirjandus 4: 197–207.
- 1980: "Была ли Нарва городом-филиалом Таллина в средние века?" (Was Narva a Branch City of Tallinn in the Middle Ages?). Eesti NSV Teaduste Akadeemia Toimetised. Ühiskonnateaduste seeria 29(2): 115–130.
- 1981: "Narva küsimus Liivi Ordu poliitikas aastail: 1494–1535" (The Question of Narva in the Politics of the Livonian Order: 1494–1535). Eesti NSV TA Toimetised. Ühiskonnateaduste seeria 30(4): 29–42.
- 1987: Religiooni ja ateismi ajaloost Eestis (The History of Religion and Atheism in Estonia). Tallinn: Eesti Raamat. 304 pages.
- 1993: (with Sulev Valdmaa, Mati Laur, and Olga Kaljundi) Uusaeg 1 (The Modern Era 1). Tallinn: Avita. 110 pages.
- 1997: (compiled with Lea Kõiv) Tallinn tules. Dokumente ja materjale Tallinna pommitamisest 9./10. märtsil 1944 (Tallinn on Fire. Documents and Materials from the Bombing of Tallinn on March 9/10, 1944), = Tallinna Linnaarhiivi toimetised 2. Tallinn: Tallinna Linnaarhiiv. 240 pages.
- 1998: (with Aivar Kriiska, Inna Põltsam-Jürjo, and Aldur Vunk) Merelinn Pärnu (The Maritime City of Pärnu). Pärnu: Pärnu Linnavalitsus. 174 pages.
- 2006: Paul Johansen. Kaugete aegade sära (The Luster of Distant Times), = Eesti mõttelugu 65. Compiled, foreword, and afterword by Jüri Kivimäe. Translated by Jüri Kivimäe, Sirje Kivimäe, and Eerik-Niiles Kross. Tartu: Ilmamaa. 528 pages.
- 2018: Eesti kiriku- ja religioonilugu (Estonian Church and Religious History). Tartu: Tartu Ülikooli Kirjastus. 390 pages.
- 2022: Balthasar Russow. Liivimaa provintsi kroonika (The Chronicle of Livonia). Translated by Jüri Kivimäe, edited by Madis Maasing and Siiri Rebane. Tallinn: Tänapäev. 472 pages.
- 2023: (multiple authors) Eesti merenduse ajalugu. 1: Eesti randade asustamisest kuni Teise maailmasõja alguseni (Estonian Maritime History. 1: From the Settlement of the Estonian Coasts to the Beginning of the Second World War). Tallinn: Varrak. 672 pages.
