= Interlingue-Union =

- Interlingue-Union
- Formation: 1908
- Purpose: Promote the use of Interlingue
- Headquarters: Central Office
- Location: Switzerland
- Region served: World
- Official language: Interlingue
- Administrator: Erich Werner
- Administrator: Bedrich Plavec
- Website: www.ie-munde.com/interlingue-union.html

The Interlingue-Union is an organisation whose goal is to popularise Interlingue, an international auxiliary language. It has existed since 1929 and is currently based in Switzerland. It is totally neutral on political and religious matters. Until 1949, the organisation was called the Occidental-Union (because the language itself was known as Occidental until that year). The Interlingue-Union publishes a magazine called Cosmoglotta.
