= Elisabeth Howen =

Estonian pedagogue

Elisabeth Howen (12 July 1834 – 26 February 1923) was a Baltic German pedagogue. She is regarded as a notable pioneer within female educational history in Estonia.

She was born in Tallinn. She was educated at Maydellsche Schule in Tallinn, and worked as a governess before she became active at the School of Auguste Kuschky in Reval in 1875.
