= Tallinn Cathedral School =

Historical school in Tallinn, Estonia

Coordinates: 59°26′12″N 24°44′17″E

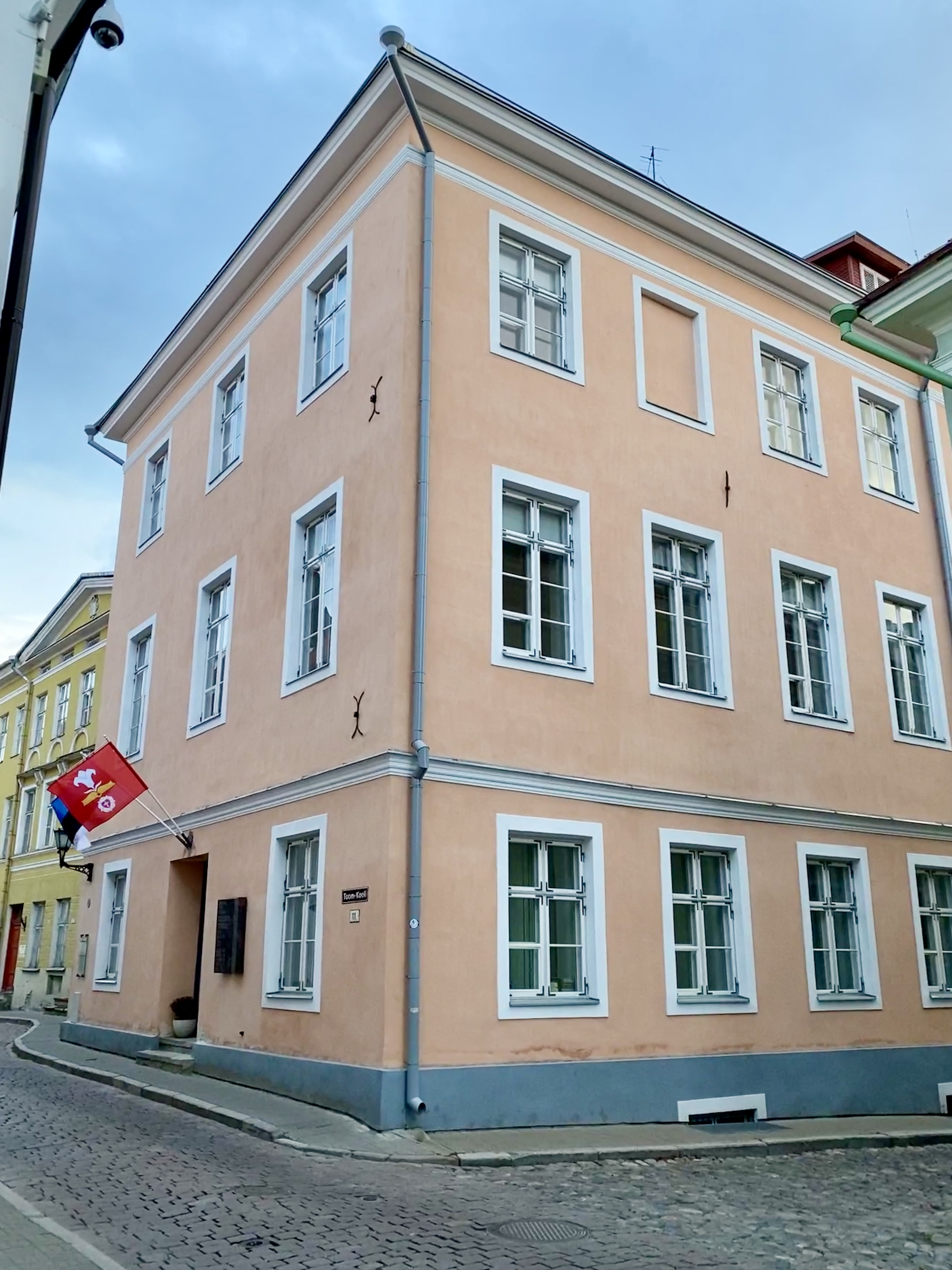
Tallinn Cathedral School at Toom-Kooli Street 11

Tallinn Cathedral School (also Tallinn Knight and Cathedral School; Estonian: Tallinna Toomkool, German: Ritter- und Domschule zu Reval, Latin: Schola cathedralis Tallinnensis) is a school in Tallinn, Estonia.

First written records of the school date back to 1319. In 1684, the school was destroyed in the large fire in the Toompea area. The construction of a new school building was completed seven years larter, in 1691. Since 1765, the school was managed by Estonian Knighthood. The construction of the building at Toom-Kooli Street 11 where the school located nowadays, was completed in 1845. In 1892, the school was closed due to Russification. In 1906, the school was re-opened. In 1920, Estonian Knighthood was liquidated and the school was managed by the successor organization of knighthood (Estonian: Eestimaa Üldkasulik Ühing). School was closed during World War II in the context of Baltic German Umsiedlung.

Since 1965, the school building is used by Tallinn Ballet School.
